= 2016 United States House of Representatives elections in New Hampshire =

- November 8, 2016

All 2 New Hampshire seats to the United States House of Representatives
	Majority party	Minority party
Party	Democratic	Republican
Last election	1	1
Seats won	2	0
Seat change	▲1	▼1
Popular vote	336,575	316,149
Percentage	46.96%	44.11%
Swing	▼4.50%	▼4.27%

Democratic
40–50%
50–60%
Republican
40–50%

The 2016 United States House of Representatives elections in New Hampshire were held on November 8, 2016, to elect the two U.S. representatives from the state of New Hampshire, one from each of the state's two congressional districts. The elections coincided with the 2016 U.S. presidential election, as well as other elections to the House of Representatives, elections to the United States Senate, and various state and local elections. The primaries were held on September 13.

== Overview ==
Results of the 2016 United States House of Representatives elections in New Hampshire by district:

District	Democratic		Republican		Others		Total		Result
District	Votes	%	Votes	%	Votes	%	Votes	%	Result
District 1	162,080	44.29%	157,176	42.95%	46,728	12.77%	365,984	100.0%	Democratic gain
District 2	174,495	49.74%	158,973	45.32%	17,324	4.94%	350,792	100.0%	Democratic hold
Total	336,575	46.96%	316,149	44.11%	64,052	8.94%	716,776	100.0%	

== District 1 ==
2016 New Hampshire's 1st congressional district election
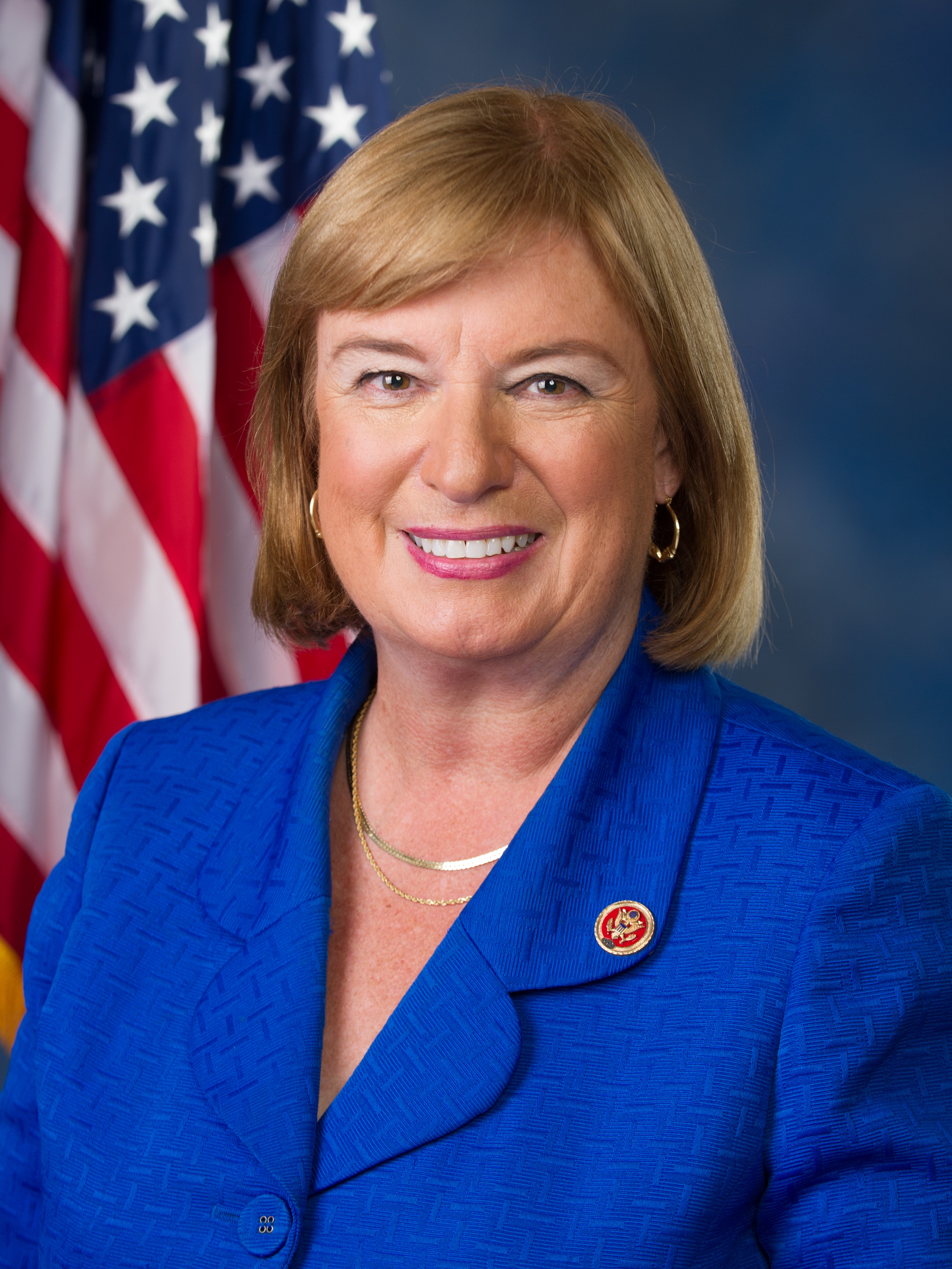

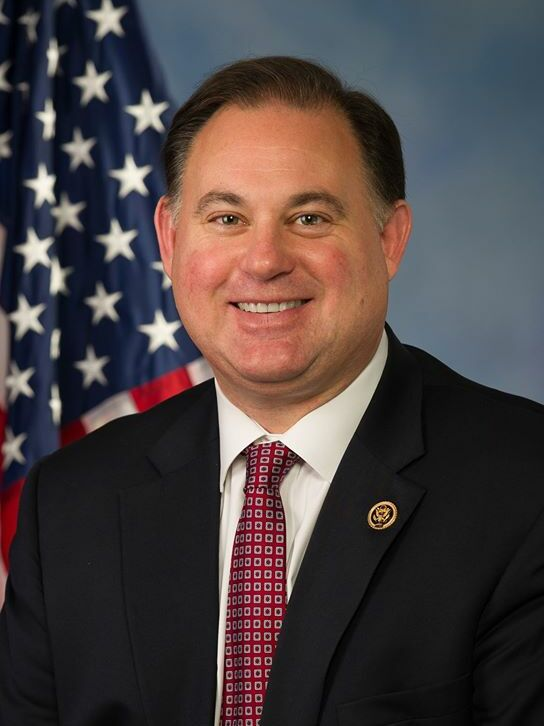

Nominee	Carol Shea-Porter	Frank Guinta	Shawn O' Connor
Party	Democratic	Republican	Independent
Popular vote	162,080	157,176	34,735
Percentage	44.3%	43.0%	9.5%
- Municipality results Shea-Porter: 40–50% 50–60% 60–70% Guinta: 40–50% 50–60% 60–70%
U.S. Representative before election
Frank Guinta
Republican
Elected U.S. Representative
Carol Shea-Porter
Democratic

The 1st district covers the southeastern part of the state and consists of three general areas: Greater Manchester, the Seacoast and the Lakes Region. Incumbent Republican Frank Guinta, who had represented the district since 2015 and previously from 2011 to 2013, ran for re-election. He was elected with 52% of the vote in 2014, defeating Democratic incumbent Carol Shea-Porter. The district had a PVI of R+1.

=== Republican primary ===
In May 2015, Guinta settled a case with the Federal Election Commission involving $355,000 that had been donated to him by his parents during his first House campaign in 2010. The settlement required him to return the donation and pay a $15,000 fine to the FEC. New Hampshire politicians including Republican U.S. Senator Kelly Ayotte called on Guinta to resign his House seat, but he refused.

==== Candidates ====
===== Nominee =====
- Frank Guinta, incumbent U.S. representative

===== Eliminated in primary =====
- Richard Ashooh, businessman
- Michael Callis
- Jamieson Gradert
- Robert Risley

===== Withdrawn =====
- Dan Innis, dean of the Peter T. Paul College of Business and Economics at the University of New Hampshire and 2014 candidate
- Pamela Tucker, state representative

===== Endorsements =====
Richard Ashooh

U.S. senators

- John E. Sununu, former U.S. senator

Newspapers

- New Hampshire Union Leader

==== Debate ====
2016 New Hampshire 1st congressional district Republican primary debate
No.	Date	Host	Moderator	Link	Republican	Republican
Key: P Participant A Absent N Not invited I Invited W Withdrawn						
Key: P Participant A Absent N Not invited I Invited W Withdrawn					Richard Ashooh	Frank Guinta
1	Sep. 13, 2016	New Hampshire Institute of Politics; New Hampshire Union Leader; WMUR-TV	Josh McElveen		P	P

==== Results ====
Republican primary results
Party	Candidate	Votes	%
Republican	Frank Guinta (incumbent)	26,400	46.5
Republican	Richard Ashooh	25,678	45.2
Republican	Michael Callis	2,243	4.0
Republican	Robert Risley	1,347	2.4
Republican	Jamieson Gradert	1,031	1.8
Write-in		111	0.1
Total votes		56,810	100.0

=== Democratic primary ===
==== Candidates ====
===== Nominee =====
- Carol Shea-Porter, former U.S. representative from this seat (2007-2011 and 2013-2015)

===== Withdrawn =====
- Shawn O'Connor, businessman (running as an independent)

===== Declined =====
- Martha Fuller Clark, state senator and nominee for the seat in 2000 and 2002
- Garth Corriveau, Manchester alderman
- Tom Ferrini, former mayor of Portsmouth
- Travis Harker, physician and former president of the New Hampshire Medical Society
- Andrew Hosmer, state senator
- Terie Norelli, state representative and former speaker of the New Hampshire House of Representatives
- Chris Pappas, executive councilor
- Stefany Shaheen, Portsmouth city councilor and daughter of U.S. Senator Jeanne Shaheen
- Donna Soucy, state senator

==== Results ====
Democratic primary results
Party	Candidate	Votes	%
Democratic	Carol Shea-Porter	32,409	98.8
Write-in		386	1.2
Total votes		32,795	100.0

=== General election ===
==== Endorsements ====
Frank Guinta (R)

Organizations

- National Republican Congressional Committee "Patriot" Program
- National Rifle Association of America
Carol Shea-Porter (D)

State legislators

- Chris Pappas, executive councilor

Organizations

- Democratic Congressional Campaign Committee "Red to Blue" Program
- EMILY's List

==== Debates ====
2016 New Hampshire 1st congressional district debates
No.	Date	Host	Moderator	Link	Republican	Democratic	Independent
Key: P Participant A Absent N Not invited I Invited W Withdrawn							
Key: P Participant A Absent N Not invited I Invited W Withdrawn					Frank Guinta	Carol Shea-Porter	Shawn O'Conner
1	Oct. 24, 2016	NH1-TV	Paul Steinhauser; Keke Vencill		P	P	P
2	Nov. 3, 2016	New Hampshire Institute of Politics; New Hampshire Union Leader; WMUR-TV	Josh McElveen		P	P	P

==== Polling ====
Poll source	Date(s) administered	Sample size	Margin of error	Frank Guinta (R)	Carol Shea-Porter (D)	Robert Lombardo (L)	Shawn O' Connor (I)	Other	Undecided
UMass Amherst/YouGov	October 17–21, 2016	380	± ?%	37%	41%	9%	−	3%	10%
Normington Petts (D-House Majority PAC)	September 18–21, 2016	400	± 4.9%	34%	44%	4%	4%	4%	10%
North Star Opinion Research (R-NRCC)	September 14–18, 2016	427	± ?%	41%	38%	4%	8%	−	9%
University of New Hampshire	August 20–28, 2016	211	± 6.7%	29%	48%	−	−	5%	19%
University of New Hampshire	July 9–18, 2016	215	± 6.7%	37%	43%	−	−	7%	10%

Hypothetical polling

Poll source	Date(s) administered	Sample size	Margin of error	Rich Ashooh (R)	Carol Shea-Porter (D)	Other	Undecided
WMUR/UNH	August 20–28, 2016	211	± 6.7%	27%	50%	4%	19%
WMUR/UNH	July 9–18, 2016	215	± 6.7%	29%	46%	6%	18%

==== Predictions ====
Source	Ranking	As of
The Cook Political Report	Lean D (flip)	November 7, 2016
Daily Kos Elections	Lean D (flip)	November 7, 2016
Rothenberg	Tilt D (flip)	November 3, 2016
Sabato's Crystal Ball	Lean D (flip)	November 7, 2016
RCP	Lean D (flip)	October 31, 2016

==== Results ====
Shea-Porter narrowly flipped the seat Democratic. This, along with the narrow victory by Democrat Maggie Hassan in the concurrent Senate election, made it the first time since 1854 that New Hampshire's congressional delegation was fully represented by Democrats.

New Hampshire's 1st congressional district, 2016
Party	Candidate	Votes	%
Democratic	Carol Shea-Porter	162,080	44.3
Republican	Frank Guinta (incumbent)	157,176	42.9
Independent	Shawn O' Connor	34,735	9.5
Independent	Brendan Kelly	6,074	1.7
Libertarian	Robert Lombardo	5,507	1.5
Write-in		412	0.1
Total votes		365,984	100.0
Democratic gain from Republican			

== District 2 ==
2016 New Hampshire's 2nd congressional district election
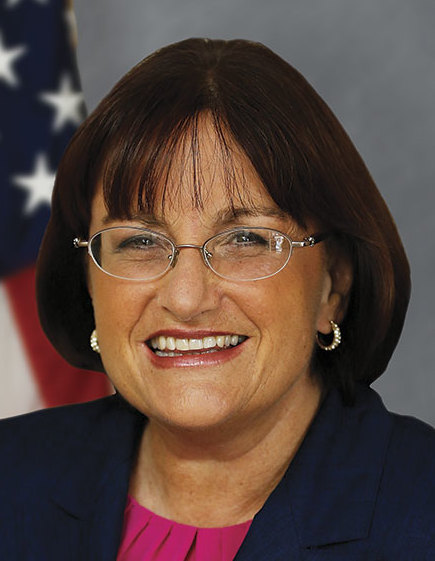

Nominee	Ann McLane Kuster	Jim Lawrence
Party	Democratic	Republican
Popular vote	174,495	158,973
Percentage	49.7%	45.3%
- Municipality results Kuster: 40–50% 50–60% 60–70% 70–80% 90–100% Lawrence: 40–50% 50–60% 60–70% 70–80% Tie (50%) No votes
U.S. Representative before election
Ann McLane Kuster
Democratic
Elected U.S. Representative
Ann McLane Kuster
Democratic

The 2nd district covers the western and northern parts of the state and includes the cities of Nashua and Concord. Incumbent Democrat Ann McLane Kuster, who had represented the district since 2013, ran for re-election. She was re-elected with 55% of the vote in 2014. The district had a PVI of D+3.

=== Democratic primary ===
==== Candidates ====
===== Nominee =====
- Ann McLane Kuster, incumbent U.S. representative

===== Declined =====
- Jim Bouley, mayor of Concord
- Dan Feltes, state senator
- Jason Lyon, activist and businessman
- Steve Shurtleff, state representative
- Colin Van Ostern, executive councilor (ran for governor)
- Mike Vlacich, campaign manager for U.S. Senator Jeanne Shaheen
- Jeff Woodburn, state senator

==== Results ====
Democratic primary results
Party	Candidate	Votes	%
Democratic	Ann McLane Kuster (incumbent)	36,683	99.3
Write-in		249	0.7
Total votes		36,932	100

=== Republican primary ===
==== Candidates ====
===== Nominee =====
- Jim Lawrence, former state representative and candidate for this seat in 2014

===== Eliminated in primary =====
- Eric Estevez, state representative
- Jack Flanagan, New Hampshire House majority leader
- Walter Kelly, candidate for Senate in 2014
- Andy Martin, perennial candidate
- Jay Mercer
- Casey Newell

===== Declined =====
- Charles Bass, former U.S. representative
- Marilinda Garcia, former state representative, and nominee for this seat in 2014
- Gary Lambert, former state senator and candidate for this seat in 2014

===== Endorsements =====
Jim Lawrence

Newspapers

- New Hampshire Union Leader

==== Debate ====
2016 New Hampshire 2nd congressional district Republican primary debate
No.	Date	Host	Moderator	Link	Republican	Republican
Key: P Participant A Absent N Not invited I Invited W Withdrawn						
Key: P Participant A Absent N Not invited I Invited W Withdrawn					Jack Flanagan	Jim Lawrence
1	Sep. 8, 2016	New Hampshire Union Leader; Saint Anselm College; WMUR	Josh McElveen		P	P

==== Results ====
Republican primary results
Party	Candidate	Votes	%
Republican	Jim Lawrence	17,180	39.7
Republican	Jack B. Flanagan	12,046	27.8
Republican	Walter W. Kelly	4,287	9.9
Republican	Andy Martin	3,145	7.3
Republican	Eric Estevez	2,443	5.6
Republican	Jay Mercer	2,113	4.9
Republican	Casey Newell	1,839	4.3
Write-in		232	0.5
Total votes		43,285	100.0

=== General election ===
==== Endorsements ====
Ann McLane Kuster (D)

Organizations

- Democratic Congressional Campaign Committee "Frontline" program
- EMILY's List

==== Debate ====
2016 New Hampshire 2nd congressional district debate
No.	Date	Host	Moderator	Link	Democratic	Republican
Key: P Participant A Absent N Not invited I Invited W Withdrawn						
Key: P Participant A Absent N Not invited I Invited W Withdrawn					Annie McLane Kuster	Jim Lawrence
1	Nov. 4, 2016	New Hampshire Institute of Politics; New Hampshire Union Leader; WMUR-TV	Josh McElveen		P	P

==== Polling ====
Poll source	Date(s) administered	Sample size	Margin of error	Ann McLane Kuster (D)	Jim Lawrence (R)	Other	Undecided
University of New Hampshire	August 20–28, 2016	222	± 6.6%	40%	34%	3%	22%
University of New Hampshire	July 9–18, 2016	254	± 6.1%	38%	32%	4%	26%

Hypothetical polling

Poll source	Date(s) administered	Sample size	Margin of error	Ann McLane Kuster (D)	Jack Flanagan (R)	Other	Undecided
WMUR/UNH	August 20–28, 2016	222	± 6.6%	40%	35%	3%	22%
WMUR/UNH	July 9–18, 2016	254	± 6.1%	38%	32%	4%	26%

==== Predictions ====
Source	Ranking	As of
The Cook Political Report	Safe D	November 7, 2016
Daily Kos Elections	Safe D	November 7, 2016
Rothenberg	Safe D	November 3, 2016
Sabato's Crystal Ball	Safe D	November 7, 2016
RCP	Safe D	October 31, 2016

==== Results ====
New Hampshire's 2nd congressional district, 2016
Party	Candidate	Votes	%
Democratic	Ann McLane Kuster (incumbent)	174,495	49.7
Republican	Jim Lawrence	158,973	45.3
Independent	John Babiarz	17,088	4.9
Write-in		236	0.1
Total votes		350,792	100.0
Democratic hold			

== See also ==
- United States House of Representatives elections, 2016
- United States elections, 2016
