= 2014 United States Senate election in New Hampshire =

- November 4, 2014
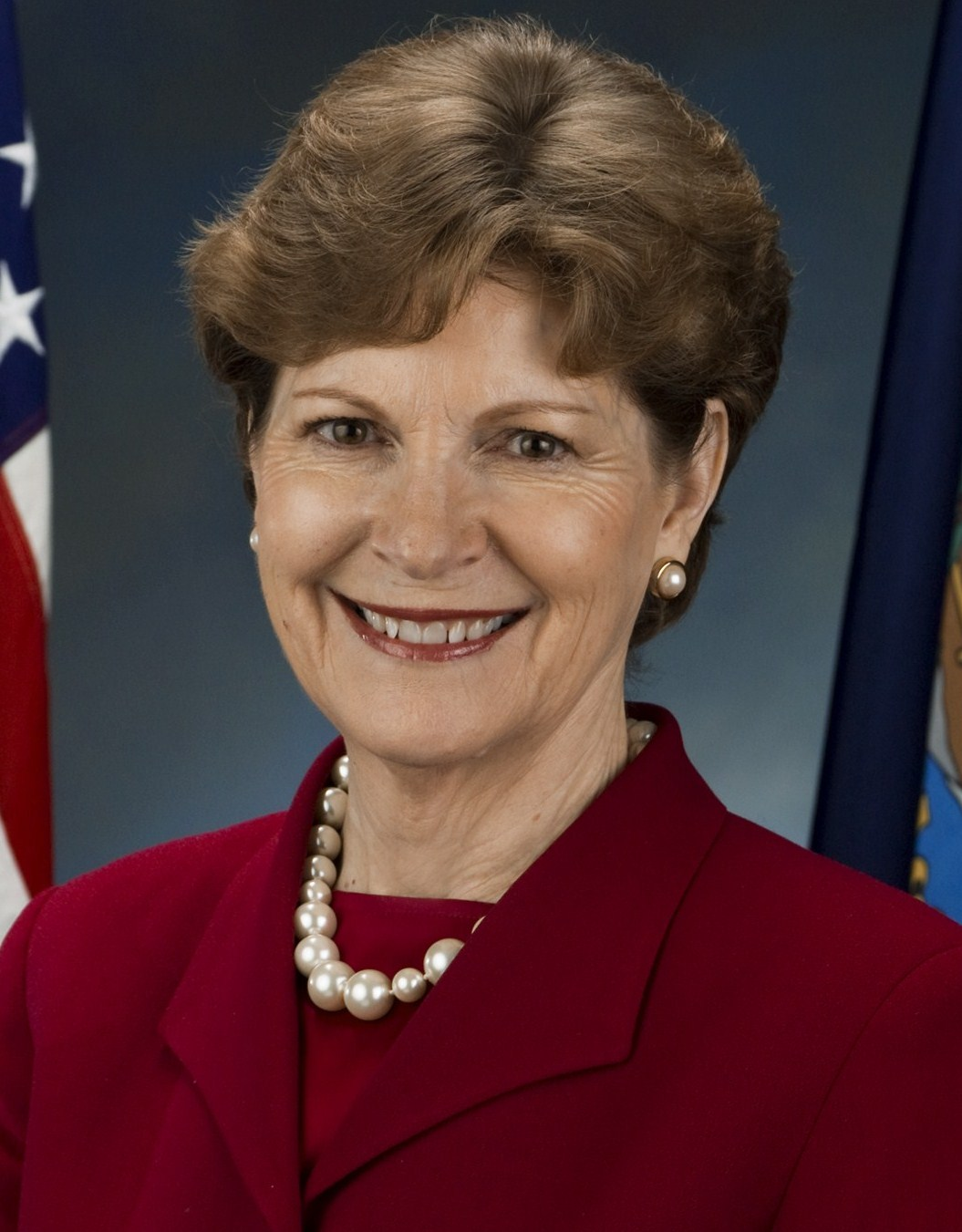

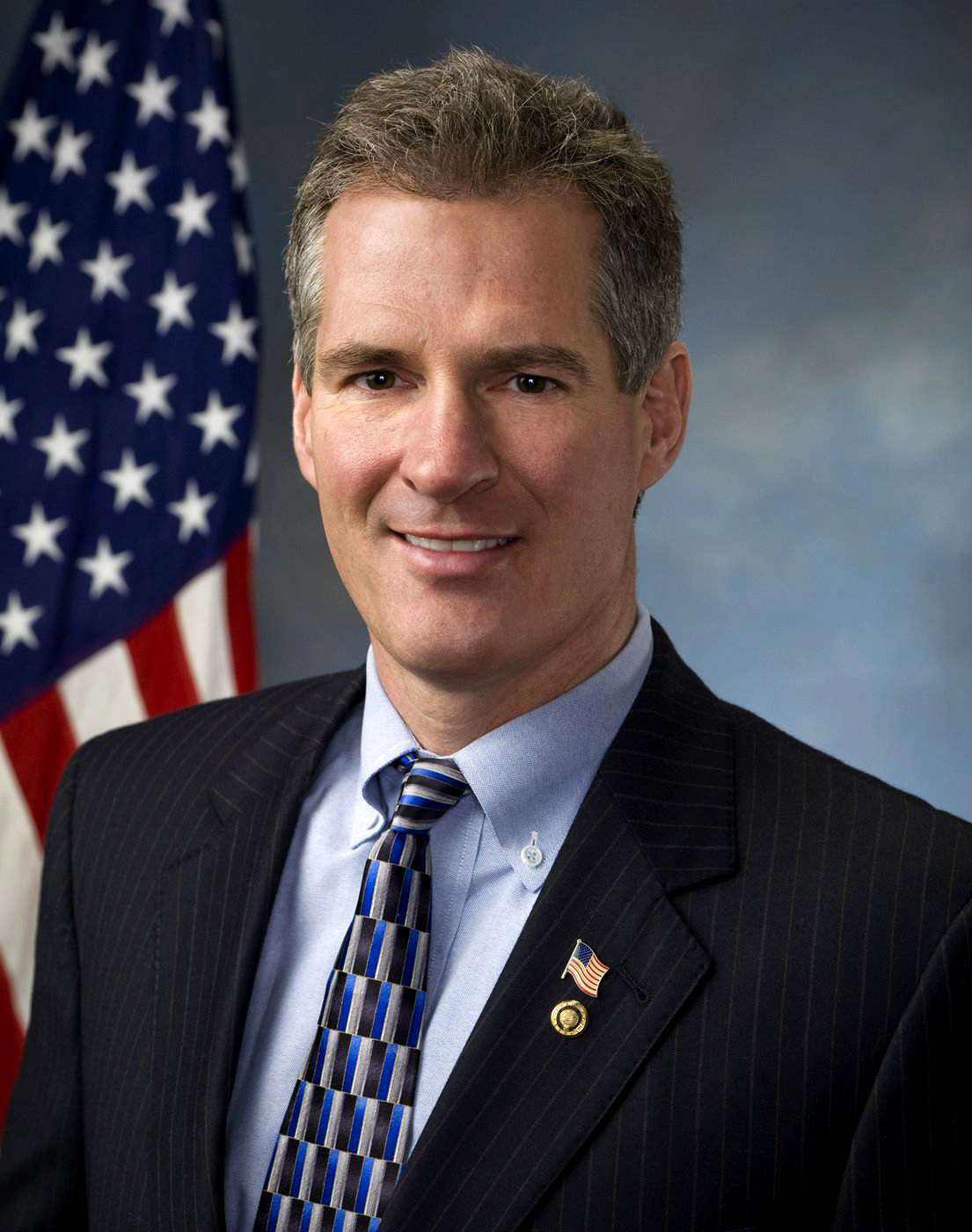
Nominee	Jeanne Shaheen	Scott Brown
Party	Democratic	Republican
Popular vote	251,184	235,347
Percentage	51.46%	48.21%
- Shaheen: 40–50% 50–60% 60–70% 70–80% 80–90% >90% Brown: 40–50% 50–60% 60–70% 70–80% >90% No votes
U.S. senator before election
Jeanne Shaheen
Democratic
Elected U.S. Senator
Jeanne Shaheen
Democratic

The 2014 United States Senate election in New Hampshire was held on November 4, 2014, to elect a member of the United States Senate to represent the state of New Hampshire, concurrently with the election of the governor of New Hampshire, as well as other elections to the United States Senate in other states and elections to the United States House of Representatives and various state and local elections.

Incumbent Democratic Senator Jeanne Shaheen ran for re-election to a second term in office. Primary elections were held on September 9, 2014. Shaheen was unopposed for the Democratic nomination and the Republicans nominated former U.S. Senator Scott Brown, who represented Massachusetts from 2010 to 2013.

Brown sought to become only the third person in history and the first in 135 years to represent more than one state in the United States Senate. Waitman T. Willey represented Virginia from 1861 to 1863 and West Virginia from 1863 to 1871 and James Shields represented Illinois from 1849 to 1855, Minnesota from 1858 to 1859 and Missouri in 1879.

Shaheen defeated Brown by 51.5% to 48.2%, making him the first man to lose two Senate races to women, as he had lost his 2012 reelection bid in Massachusetts to Elizabeth Warren. Shaheen became the second Democrat from New Hampshire to be reelected to the Senate and the first since Thomas J. McIntyre in 1972.

== Democratic primary ==
Shaheen was unopposed for the Democratic nomination.

=== Candidates ===
==== Declared ====
- Jeanne Shaheen, incumbent U.S. Senator

=== Endorsements ===
Jeanne Shaheen

Individuals

- Hillary Clinton, 67th United States Secretary of State and candidate for President in 2008
- Angus King, U.S. Senator (I-ME)
- Elizabeth Warren, U.S. Senator (D-MA)

=== Results ===
Democratic primary results
Party	Candidate	Votes	%
Democratic	Jeanne Shaheen (incumbent)	74,504	100.00%

== Republican primary ==
The Republican primary for this election was much more highly contested than the respective Democratic one, with Scott Brown beating out Jim Rubens and Bob Smith for the Republican nomination.

=== Candidates ===
==== Declared ====
- Gerard Beloin, candidate for New Hampshire's 2nd congressional district in 2012 and candidate for the U.S. Senate in 2010
- Scott Brown, former U.S. Senator from Massachusetts (2010-2013)
- Robert D'Arcy
- Miroslaw "Miro" Dziedzic, candidate for New Hampshire's 2nd congressional district in 2012
- Mark W. Farnham, candidate for the U.S. Senate in 1992
- Bob Heghmann
- Walter W. Kelly
- Andy Martin, perennial candidate
- Jim Rubens, Chairman of the Granite State Coalition Against Expanded Gambling, former state senator and candidate for Governor in 1998
- Bob Smith, former U.S. Senator from this seat (1990-2003) and candidate for President in 2000

==== Withdrew ====
- Karen Testerman, conservative activist and candidate for Governor in 2010 (endorsed Smith)

==== Declined ====
- Richard Ashooh, candidate for New Hampshire's 1st congressional district in 2010
- Al Baldasaro, state representative
- Charles Bass, former U.S. Representative
- Bill Binnie, industrialist, investment banker and candidate for the U.S. Senate in 2010
- Jeb Bradley, Majority Leader of the New Hampshire Senate and former U.S. Representative
- David M. Cote, chairman and CEO of Honeywell
- Judd Gregg, former U.S. Senator and former governor of New Hampshire
- Frank Guinta, former U.S. Representative (ran for NH-01)
- Daniel Innis, Dean of the Peter T. Paul College of Business and Economics at the University of New Hampshire (ran for NH-01)
- Ovide Lamontagne, businessman, candidate for the U.S. Senate in 2010 and nominee for Governor in 1996 and 2012
- Andy Sanborn, state senator
- Mark Steyn, conservative author and political commentator
- Chris Sununu, executive councillor, son of former governor John H. Sununu and brother of former U.S. Senator John E. Sununu (ran for re-election)
- John E. Sununu, former U.S. Senator
- Fred Tausch, businessman
- Fran Wendelboe, former state representative and candidate for New Hampshire's 1st congressional district in 2002

=== Endorsements ===
Scott Brown

Individuals

- Nancy Stiles, state senator
- John Bolton, former Ambassador to the United Nations (2005–2006)
- Mitt Romney, former governor of Massachusetts and 2012 Republican nominee for President of the United States

=== Polling ===
Poll source	Date(s) administered	Sample size	Margin of error	Charles Bass	Scott Brown	Andy Martin	Jim Rubens	Bob Smith	Karen Testerman	Other	Undecided
New England College	October 7–9, 2013	424	± 4.56%	21%	47%	—	5%	—	4%	—	23%
Public Policy Polling	January 9–12, 2014	528	± 4.3%	—	42%	11%	8%	11%	7%	—	22%
Public Policy Polling	January 9–12, 2014	528	± 4.3%	—	—	4%	12%	26%	10%	—	47%
Gravis Marketing	January 29–30, 2014	498	± 4.3%	—	51%	—	—	22%	—	—	27%
Suffolk/Boston Herald	February 27 – March 5, 2014	426	± 4.8%	—	33.33%	0.7%	3.05%	11.97%	3.29%	—	47.65%
Vox Populi Polling	May 14–15, 2014	?	± 5.2%	—	38%	—	9%	13%	8%	—	32%
Suffolk/Boston Herald	June 14–18, 2014	419	± 4.8%	—	40.33%	0.24%	3.58%	12.17%	—	2.88%	40.81%
NBC/Marist	July 7–13, 2014	1,342	± 2.7%	—	61%	—	10%	16%	—	1%	12%

=== Results ===
Results by county: Brown: 30–40%; 40–50%; 50–60%

Republican primary results
Party	Candidate	Votes	%
Republican	Scott Brown	58,775	49.86%
Republican	Jim Rubens	27,089	22.98%
Republican	Bob Smith	26,593	22.56%
Republican	Walter W. Kelly	1,376	1.17%
Republican	Bob Heghmann	784	0.67%
Republican	Andy Martin	734	0.62%
Republican	Mark W. Farnham	733	0.62%
Republican	Miroslaw "Miro" Dziedzic	508	0.43%
Republican	Gerard Beloin	492	0.42%
Republican	Robert D'Arcy	397	0.34%
Democratic	Jeanne Shaheen (write-in)	220	0.19%
	Scatter	183	0.16%
Total votes		117,884	100.00%

== General election ==
=== Debates ===
- Complete video of debate, October 21, 2014
- Complete video of debate, October 23, 2014

=== Fundraising ===
Candidate (party)	Receipts	Disbursements	Cash on hand	Debt
Jeanne Shaheen (D)	$16,506,920.00	$16,466,208.00	$88,652.00	$10,620.00
Scott Brown (R)	$9,222,677.00	$9,163,652.00	$59,026.00	$0
Source: Federal Election Commission

=== Independent expenditures ===
Super PAC	Supporting	Amount	Media	Goal
Senate Majority PAC	Jeanne Shaheen	$682,558	TV	Oppose Scott Brown
League of Conservation Voters Victory Fund	Jeanne Shaheen	$364,320	TV	Oppose Scott Brown
Ending Spending Inc.	Scott Brown	$61,448	Media	Oppose Jeanne Shaheen
Ending Spending Action Fund	Scott Brown	$60,136	Media	Support Scott Brown
New Hampshire PAC to Save America	Jim Rubens	$57,866	Direct Mail	Support Jim Rubens
NextGen Climate Action Committee	Jeanne Shaheen	$37,421	Digital Advertising	Oppose Scott Brown
Ocean Champions	Jeanne Shaheen	$25,000	Media	Oppose Scott Brown
Tea Party Victory Fund	Bob Smith	$15,000	Voter Contact Calls	Support Bob Smith

=== Predictions ===
Source	Ranking	As of
The Cook Political Report	Tossup	November 3, 2014
Sabato's Crystal Ball	Lean D	November 3, 2014
Rothenberg Political Report	Tilt D	November 3, 2014
Real Clear Politics	Tossup	November 3, 2014

=== Polling ===
Poll source	Date(s) administered	Sample size	Margin of error	Jeanne Shaheen (D)	Scott Brown (R)	Other	Undecided
Public Policy Polling	April 19–21, 2013	933	± ?	52%	41%	—	7%
Rockefeller Center	April 22–25, 2013	433	± 4.7%	44%	30%	—	26%
New England College	May 2–5, 2013	807	± 3.27%	54%	35%	—	11%
Public Policy Polling	September 13–16, 2013	1,038	± 3%	48%	44%	—	7%
American Research Group	December 13–16, 2013	549	± 4.2%	48%	38%	—	14%
Public Policy Polling	January 9–12, 2014	1,354	± 2.7%	46%	43%	—	10%
Purple Strategies	January 21–23, 2014	1,052	± 3%	44%	44%	—	12%
Harper Polling	January 22–23, 2014	513	± 4.33%	40%	35%	—	25%
WMUR/UNH	January 21–26, 2014	454	± 4.1%	47%	37%	3%	14%
Public Policy Polling	February 19–20, 2014	686	± 3.7%	47%	39%	—	14%
Suffolk/Boston Herald	February 27 – March 5, 2014	800	± 3.5%	52%	39%	—	9%
Rasmussen Reports	March 12–13, 2014	750	± 4%	50%	41%	4%	5%
American Research Group	March 13–16, 2014	533	± 4.2%	50%	38%	—	12%
Public Policy Polling	April 7–8, 2014	1,034	± 3.1%	49%	41%	—	10%
WMUR/UNH	April 1–9, 2014	387	± 5%	45%	39%	2%	14%
Rockefeller Center	April 21–25, 2014	412	± 4.8%	39%	36%	—	25%
Hickman Analytics	April 24–30, 2014	400	± 4.9%	49%	43%	—	8%
Vox Populi Polling	May 14–15, 2014	707	± 3.6%	47%	35%	—	18%
American Research Group	June 14–18, 2014	540	± 4.2%	50%	38%	—	12%
Suffolk/Boston Herald	June 14–18, 2014	800	± 3.5%	49%	39%	3%	9%
WMUR/UNH	June 19 – July 1, 2014	509	± 4.3%	52%	40%	1%	7%
NBC News/Marist	July 7–13, 2014	1,342	± 2.7%	50%	42%	1%	6%
Magellan Strategies	July 7–13, 2014	1,618	± 2.43%	46%	41%	—	13%
CBS News/NYT/YouGov	July 5–24, 2014	1,251	± 2.9%	50%	40%	4%	6%
WMUR/UNH	August 7–17, 2014	609	± 4%	46%	44%	1%	9%
Public Policy Polling	August 27–28, 2014	766	± ?	50%	44%	—	6%
Public Opinion Strategies	August 27 – September 1, 2014	500	± 4.38%	44%	41%	9%	6%
CBS News/NYT/YouGov	August 18 – September 2, 2014	1,159	± 4%	47%	41%	4%	9%
Kiley & Company	September 2–4, 2014	602	± 4%	50%	42%	—	8%
Global Strategy Group	September 10, 2014	1,027	± 3.1%	48%	41%	—	11%
Kiley & Company	September 9–11, 2014	600	± 4%	51%	43%	—	6%
CNN/ORC	September 8–11, 2014	735 LV	± 3.5%	48%	48%	—	4%
CNN/ORC	September 8–11, 2014	883 RV	± 3.5%	51%	44%	—	5%
Magellan Strategies	September 10–11, 2014	2,214	± 2%	44%	46%	—	10%
Rasmussen Reports	September 10–11, 2014	1,027	± 3.1%	48%	42%	5%	5%
New England College	September 10–11, 2014	630	± 3.98%	51%	40%	5%	4%
American Research Group	September 12–15, 2014	544	± 4.2%	50%	45%	—	5%
Vox Populi Polling	September 15–16, 2014	550	± 4.2%	43%	47%	—	11%
Public Policy Polling	September 18–19, 2014	652	± 3.8%	50%	44%	—	5%
New England College	September 19–20, 2014	1,494	± 2.54%	50%	43%	4%	3%
American Research Group	September 27–29, 2014	600	± 4%	53%	43%	—	4%
New England College	September 26, 2014	1,331	± 2.69%	47%	47%	3%	3%
CBS News/NYT/YouGov	September 20 – October 1, 2014	1,260	± 3%	48%	41%	1%	10%
New England College	October 3, 2014	1,286	± 2.73%	49%	46%	3%	2%
WMUR/UNH	September 29 – October 5, 2014	532	± 4.2%	47%	41%	1%	10%
High Point University	October 4–8, 2014	824	± 3.4%	48%	46%	—	6%
Kiley & Company	October 7–9, 2014	600	± 4%	50%	44%	—	6%
New England College	October 9, 2014	1,081	± 2.98%	47%	48%	3%	2%
UMass Amherst	October 10–15, 2014	322 LV	± 6.6%	48%	45%	5%	2%
UMass Amherst	October 10–15, 2014	400 RV	± 6%	49%	41%	5%	5%
New England College	October 16, 2014	921	± 3.23%	47%	48%	3%	2%
Suffolk/Boston Herald	October 16–19, 2014	500	± ?	49%	46%	—	6%
UMass Lowell	October 15–21, 2014	643 LV	± 4.5%	49%	46%	1%	4%
UMass Lowell	October 15–21, 2014	900 RV	± 3.8%	48%	41%	2%	10%
CNN/ORC	October 18–21, 2014	645 LV	± 4%	49%	47%	—	3%
CNN/ORC	October 18–21, 2014	877 RV	± 3.5%	50%	44%	—	5%
Public Policy Polling	October 20–21, 2014	764	± ?	49%	45%	—	5%
American Research Group	October 19–22, 2014	600	± 4%	49%	48%	—	3%
CBS News/NYT/YouGov	October 16–23, 2014	1,042	± 4%	46%	41%	1%	12%
New England College	October 24, 2014	1,132	± 2.91%	47%	48%	3%	2%
WMUR/UNH	October 22–26, 2014	555	± 4.2%	50%	42%	—	8%
Vox Populi Polling	October 27–28, 2014	638	± 3.9%	49%	45%	—	6%
American Research Group	October 27–29, 2014	600	± 4%	49%	49%	—	2%
Rasmussen Reports	October 29–30, 2014	940	± 3%	52%	45%	1%	2%
Public Policy Polling	October 30–31, 2014	679	± ?	49%	47%	—	4%
New England College	October 31 – November 1, 2014	1,526	± 2.51%	48%	49%	1%	2%
WMUR/UNH	October 29 – November 2, 2014	757	± 3.6%	47%	45%	3%	6%
Public Policy Polling	November 1–3, 2014	1,690	± 2.4%	50%	48%	—	3%

Hypothetical polling

Poll source	Date(s) administered	Sample size	Margin of error	Jeanne Shaheen (D)	Charles Bass (R)	Other	Undecided
Public Policy Polling	September 13–16, 2013	1,038	± 3%	51%	41%	—	8%
New England College	October 7–9, 2013	1,063	± 3%	51%	32%	—	17%
WMUR/UNH	October 7–16, 2013	663	± 3.8%	51%	34%	2%	13%

Poll source	Date(s) administered	Sample size	Margin of error	Jeanne Shaheen (D)	Jeb Bradley (R)	Other	Undecided
Public Policy Polling	April 19–21, 2013	933	± ?	54%	39%	—	7%
Rockefeller Center	April 22–25, 2013	433	± 4.7%	48%	25%	—	27%

Poll source	Date(s) administered	Sample size	Margin of error	Jeanne Shaheen (D)	Ted Gatsas (R)	Other	Undecided
Public Policy Polling	April 19–21, 2013	933	± ?	53%	34%	—	14%

Poll source	Date(s) administered	Sample size	Margin of error	Jeanne Shaheen (D)	Frank Guinta (R)	Other	Undecided
Public Policy Polling	April 19–21, 2013	933	± ?	55%	37%	—	8%

Poll source	Date(s) administered	Sample size	Margin of error	Jeanne Shaheen (D)	Dan Innis (R)	Other	Undecided
Public Policy Polling	September 13–16, 2013	1,038	± 3%	52%	30%	—	18%

Poll source	Date(s) administered	Sample size	Margin of error	Jeanne Shaheen (D)	Andy Martin (R)	Other	Undecided
Suffolk/Boston Herald	February 27 – March 5, 2014	800	± 3.5%	52%	27%	—	21%

Poll source	Date(s) administered	Sample size	Margin of error	Jeanne Shaheen (D)	Jim Rubens (R)	Other	Undecided
Public Policy Polling	September 13–16, 2013	1,038	± 3%	50%	33%	—	17%
WMUR/UNH	October 7–16, 2013	516	± 3.8%	53%	28%	1%	18%
Public Policy Polling	January 9–12, 2014	1,354	± 3.7%	49%	33%	—	19%
WMUR/UNH	January 21–26, 2014	461	± 4.1%	46%	32%	1%	20%
Suffolk/Boston Herald	February 27 – March 5, 2014	800	± 3.5%	52%	29%	—	19%
WMUR/UNH	April 1–9, 2014	387	± 5%	48%	27%	1%	23%
Rockefeller Center	April 21–25, 2014	412	± 4.8%	38%	19%	—	42%
WMUR/UNH	June 19 – July 1, 2014	509	± 4.3%	56%	30%	1%	13%
WMUR/UNH	August 7–17, 2014	609	± 4%	49%	35%	1%	15%

Poll source	Date(s) administered	Sample size	Margin of error	Jeanne Shaheen (D)	Bob Smith (R)	Other	Undecided
Public Policy Polling	September 13–16, 2013	1,038	± 3%	51%	35%	—	14%
American Research Group	December 13–16, 2013	549	± 4.2%	50%	32%	—	18%
Public Policy Polling	January 9–12, 2014	1,354	± 3.7%	48%	34%	—	18%
WMUR/UNH	January 21–26, 2014	460	± 4.1%	47%	36%	2%	15%
Suffolk/Boston Herald	February 27 – March 5, 2014	800	± 3.5%	53%	32%	—	15%
WMUR/UNH	April 1–9, 2014	387	± 5%	48%	34%	1%	17%
Rockefeller Center	April 21–25, 2014	412	± 4.8%	38%	32%	—	29%
Vox Populi Polling	May 14–15, 2014	707	± 3.6%	45%	34%	—	21%
Suffolk/Boston Herald	June 14–18, 2014	800	± 3.5%	51%	31%	4%	14%
WMUR/UNH	June 19 – July 1, 2014	509	± 4.3%	57%	34%	1%	8%
WMUR/UNH	August 7–17, 2014	609	± 4%	50%	36%	2%	13%

Poll source	Date(s) administered	Sample size	Margin of error	Jeanne Shaheen (D)	Chris Sununu (R)	Other	Undecided
Public Policy Polling	April 19–21, 2013	933	± ?	53%	39%	—	9%

Poll source	Date(s) administered	Sample size	Margin of error	Jeanne Shaheen (D)	John Sununu (R)	Other	Undecided
Public Policy Polling	November 14–15, 2012	1,018	± 3.1%	53%	42%	—	5%

Poll source	Date(s) administered	Sample size	Margin of error	Jeanne Shaheen (D)	Karen Testerman (R)	Other	Undecided
Public Policy Polling	September 13–16, 2013	1,038	± 3%	50%	31%	—	19%
Public Policy Polling	January 9–12, 2014	1,354	± 3.7%	47%	30%	—	22%
WMUR/UNH	January 21–26, 2014	461	± 4.1%	48%	29%	2%	21%
Suffolk/Boston Herald	February 27 – March 5, 2014	800	± 3.5%	52%	29%	—	19%
WMUR/UNH	April 1–9, 2014	387	± 5%	48%	25%	2%	25%
Rockefeller Center	April 21–25, 2014	412	± 4.8%	39%	18%	—	43%

Poll source	Date(s) administered	Sample size	Margin of error	Jeanne Shaheen (D)	Generic Republican	Other	Undecided
Public Policy Polling	August 9–12, 2012	1,055	± 3%	51%	42%	—	7%
Public Policy Polling	October 17–19, 2012	1,036	± 3%	48%	42%	—	10%
Public Policy Polling	November 3–4, 2012	1,550	± 2.5%	49%	39%	—	12%

=== Results ===

The race was close throughout the night. However, with 57% of the vote in, MSNBC was comfortable enough with Shaheen's lead to declare her the victor. Brown called Shaheen to concede at 11:32 P.M. EST. Shaheen won with a 3.3% margin of victory over Brown, securing a majority of the votes cast by over 1%.

United States Senate election in New Hampshire, 2014
Party	Candidate	Votes	%	±%
Democratic	Jeanne Shaheen (incumbent)	251,184	51.46%	−0.16%
Republican	Scott Brown	235,347	48.21%	+2.93%
Write-in		1,628	0.33%	N/A
Total votes		488,159	100.0%	N/A
Democratic hold				

==== By county ====
2014 Senate election results in New Hampshire (by county)
County	Jeanne Shaheen Democratic		Scott Brown Republican		Other votes	
	#	%	#	%	#	%
Belknap	11,097	46.75%	12,566	52.94%	75	0.32%
Carroll	10,502	50.74%	10,150	49.04%	44	0.21%
Cheshire	16,468	60.52%	10,598	38.95%	146	0.54%
Coös	6,611	62.13%	3,998	37.58%	31	0.29%
Grafton	20,496	61.63%	12,654	38.05%	107	0.32%
Hillsborough	67,191	48.58%	70,529	51.0%	580	0.42%
Merrimack	32,413	56.68%	24,597	43.02%	171	0.3%
Rockingham	53,934	45.21%	65,056	54.54%	300	0.25%
Strafford	23,710	55.94%	18,541	43.74%	134	0.32%
Sullivan	8,762	56.68%	6,658	43.07%	40	0.26%

Counties that flipped from Republican to Democratic

- Carroll (largest municipality: Conway)

Counties that flipped from Democratic to Republican

- Hillsborough (largest municipality: Manchester)

==== By congressional district ====
Shaheen and Brown each won one of two congressional districts.

District	Shaheen	Brown	Representative
1st	49.34%	50.66%	Frank Guinta
2nd	53.94%	46.06%	Ann McLane Kuster

== See also ==
- 2014 United States Senate elections
- 2014 United States elections
- 2014 United States House of Representatives elections in New Hampshire
- 2014 New Hampshire gubernatorial election
