= 2014 New Hampshire gubernatorial election =

- November 4, 2014
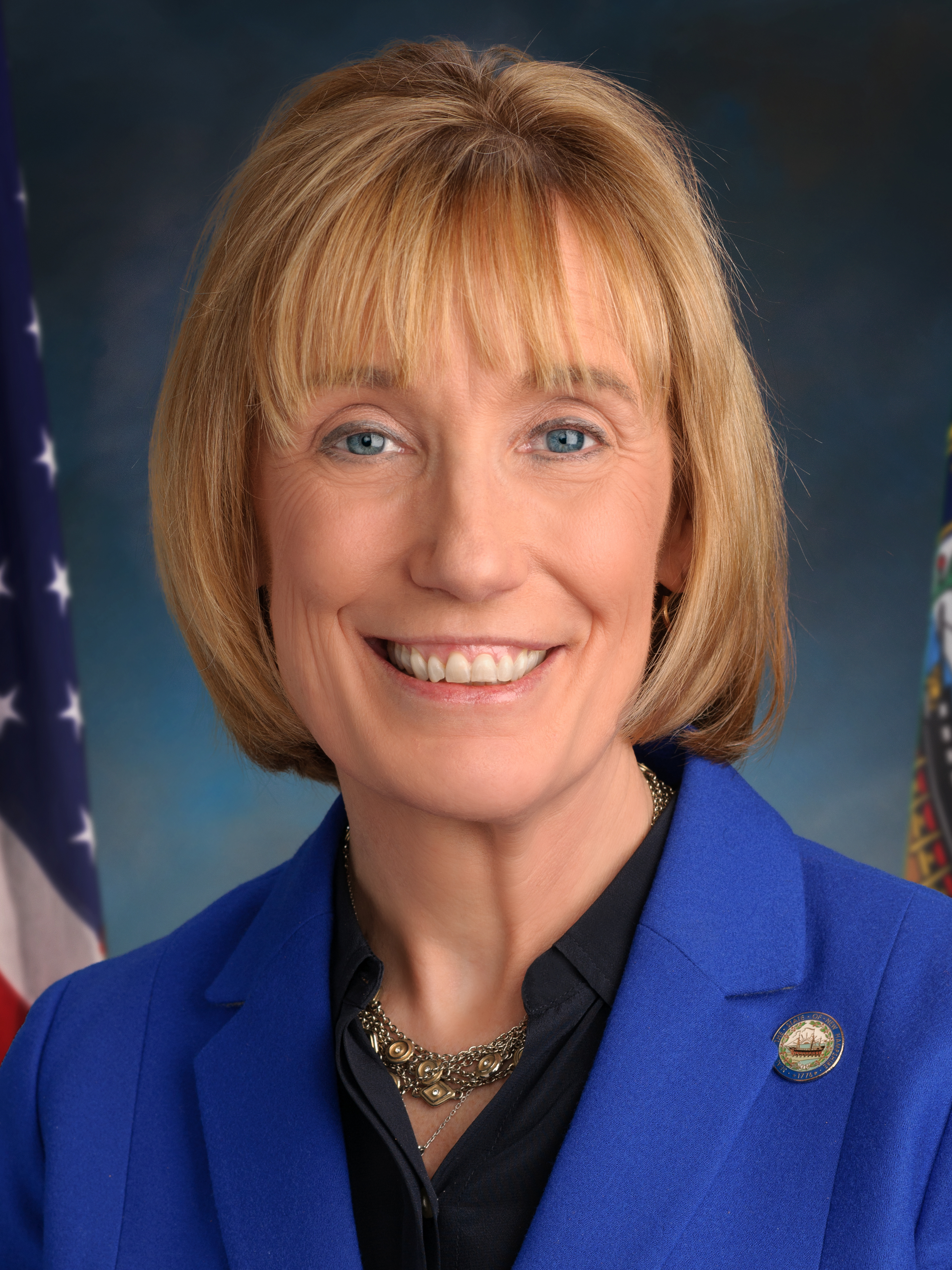

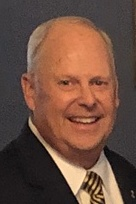
Nominee	Maggie Hassan	Walt Havenstein
Party	Democratic	Republican
Popular vote	254,666	229,610
Percentage	52.37%	47.43%
- Hassan: 40–50% 50–60% 60–70% 70–80% Havenstein: 40–50% 50–60% 60–70% 70–80% >90%
Governor before election
Maggie Hassan
Democratic
Elected Governor
Maggie Hassan
Democratic

The 2014 New Hampshire gubernatorial election was held on November 4, 2014, to elect the governor of New Hampshire, concurrently with the election to New Hampshire's Class II U.S. Senate seat, as well as other elections to the United States Senate in other states and elections to the United States House of Representatives and various state and local elections. Incumbent Democratic governor Maggie Hassan ran for re-election to a second term in office. She defeated the Republican nominee, businessman Walt Havenstein. As of 2026, this is the last time a Democrat was elected Governor of New Hampshire.

Hassan would retire in 2016 to run successfully for the Senate.

== Background ==
Incumbent Democratic governor John Lynch decided to retire in 2012, rather than seek re-election to a fifth term in office. The Democratic nominee, former State Senate Majority Leader Maggie Hassan, defeated the Republican nominee, attorney and 1996 gubernatorial nominee Ovide M. Lamontagne, 55% to 43%.

New Hampshire and Vermont are the only states in the country whose governors are elected every two years. On only one occasion since 1924 has a first-term governor of New Hampshire been defeated for re-election to a second term: in 2004, when Lynch beat incumbent Republican governor Craig Benson.

Hassan had high approval ratings. An April 2014 WMUR/University of New Hampshire poll found that 57% of registered voters approved of the job she was doing, 58% had a favorable opinion of her, and 70% thought the state was going in the right direction. For these reasons, Hassan was not considered vulnerable going into the election. The Cook Political Report, Daily Kos Elections, Governing and Sabato's Crystal Ball all considered the race "likely Democratic" and RealClearPolitics and The Rothenberg Political Report rated the race "safe Democratic".

== Democratic primary ==
=== Candidates ===
==== Declared ====
- Ian Freeman, radio show host
- Maggie Hassan, incumbent governor
- Clecia Terrio, candidate for the State House in 2012

Hassan won the Democratic Party primary, held on September 9, 2014, with 94.3% of the votes cast.

=== Results ===
Democratic primary results
Party	Candidate	Votes	%
Democratic	Maggie Hassan	39,115	93.07
Democratic	Ian Freeman	1,719	4.09
Democratic	Clecia Terrio	704	1.68
Democratic	Other	488	1.16
Total votes		42,026	100

== Republican primary ==
=== Candidates ===
==== Declared ====
- Daniel J. Greene
- Walt Havenstein, businessman
- Andrew Hemingway, businessman, Tea Party activist and candidate for Chairman of the New Hampshire Republican State Committee in 2013
- Jonathan Smolin

Havenstein won the Republican Party primary, held on September 9, 2014, with 55.6% of the votes cast.

==== Declined ====
- William Harrison Binnie, industrialist, investment banker and candidate for the U.S. Senate in 2010
- Jeb Bradley, Majority Leader of the New Hampshire Senate and former U.S. representative
- Brad Cook, attorney
- Jeanie Forrester, state senator
- Ted Gatsas, Mayor of Manchester
- Frank Guinta, former U.S. representative (ran for NH-01)
- Gary Lambert, former state senator (ran for NH-02)
- George Lambert, state representative
- Ovide Lamontagne, businessman, candidate for the U.S. Senate in 2010 and nominee for governor in 1996 and 2012
- Chuck Morse, state senator
- Bob Odell, state senator
- John Reagan, state senator
- Chuck Rolecek, businessman and candidate for the Executive Council of New Hampshire in 2012
- Andy Sanborn, state senator
- Kevin H. Smith, conservative activist, former state representative and candidate for governor in 2012
- John Stephen, former Commissioner of the New Hampshire Department of Health & Human Services and nominee for governor in 2010
- Christopher Sununu, Executive Councillor, son of former governor John H. Sununu and brother of former U.S. senator John E. Sununu (ran for re-election)
- John E. Sununu, former U.S. senator

=== Polling ===
Poll source	Date(s) administered	Sample size	Margin of error	Bill Binnie	Ted Gatsas	Daniel Greene	Walt Havenstein	Andrew Hemingway	George Lambert	Chuck Morse	Jonathan Smolin	Other	Undecided
Suffolk	June 14–18, 2014	419	±4.8%	—	—	3.82%	12.89%	6.92%	—	—	1.67%	—	74.7%
Vox Populi Polling	May 14–15, 2014	?	±5.2%	—	—	—	12%	12%	—	—	—	—	76%
Suffolk	Feb. 27–Mar. 5, 2014	426	± ?	8.45%	15.02%	—	—	1.88%	1.88%	7.04%	—	—	65.72%

=== Results ===
Republican primary results
Party	Candidate	Votes	%
Republican	Walter Havenstein	62,766	55.7
Republican	Andrew Hemingway	42,005	37.3
Republican	Daniel Greene	5,362	4.8
Republican	Jonathan Smolin	2,620	2.3
Total votes		112,753	100

== General election ==
=== Debates ===
- Complete video of debate, October 22, 2014

=== Predictions ===
Source	Ranking	As of
The Cook Political Report	Lean D	November 3, 2014
Sabato's Crystal Ball	Lean D	November 3, 2014
Rothenberg Political Report	Likely D	November 3, 2014
Real Clear Politics	Tossup	November 3, 2014

=== Polling ===
Poll source	Date(s) administered	Sample size	Margin of error	Maggie Hassan (D)	Walt Havenstein (R)	Other	Undecided
Public Policy Polling	November 1–3, 2014	1,690	± 2.4%	51%	46%	—	3%
WMUR/UNH	October 29–November 2, 2014	757	± 3.6%	47%	43%	1%	9%
New England College	October 31–November 1, 2014	1,526	± 2.51%	51%	44%	2%	3%
Rasmussen Reports	October 29–30, 2014	940	± 3%	51%	42%	—	7%
Vox Populi Polling	October 27–28, 2014	638	± 3.9%	44%	47%	—	7%
WMUR/UNH	October 19–22, 2014	555	± 4.2%	52%	37%	1%	11%
American Research Group	October 19–22, 2014	600	± 4%	48%	46%	—	6%
New England College	October 24, 2014	1,132	± 2.91%	47%	47%	2%	4%
CBS News/NYT/YouGov	October 16–23, 2014	1,042	± 4%	47%	38%	1%	13%
American Research Group	October 19–22, 2014	600	± 4%	53%	43%	—	4%
Public Policy Polling	October 20–21, 2014	764	± ?	53%	43%	—	4%
CNN/ORC	October 18–21, 2014	645 LV	± 4%	51%	45%	—	4%
CNN/ORC	October 18–21, 2014	877 RV	± 3.5%	54%	40%	—	5%
UMass Lowell	October 15–21, 2014	643 LV	± 4.5%	49%	45%	—	7%
UMass Lowell	October 15–21, 2014	900 RV	± 3.8%	49%	40%	—	11%
Suffolk/Boston Herald	October 16–19, 2014	500	± ?	49%	39%	—	11%
New England College	October 16, 2014	921	± 3.23%	51%	43%	3%	4%
New England College	October 9, 2014	1,081	± 2.98%	49%	44%	3%	5%
High Point University	October 4–8, 2014	824	± 3.4%	50%	42%	4%	4%
WMUR/UNH	September 29–October 5, 2014	532	± 4.2%	46%	36%	2%	16%
New England College	October 3, 2014	1,286	± 2.73%	51%	41%	3%	4%
CBS News/NYT/YouGov	September 20–October 1, 2014	1,260	± 3%	49%	39%	0%	12%
New England College	September 26, 2014	1,331	± 2.69%	48%	44%	3%	5%
American Research Group	September 27–29, 2014	600	± 4%	55%	40%	—	5%
New England College	September 19–20, 2014	1,494	± 2.54%	52%	40%	4%	5%
Public Policy Polling	September 18–19, 2014	652	± 3.8%	52%	43%	—	4%
Vox Populi Polling	September 15–16, 2014	550	± 4.2%	47%	43%	—	10%
American Research Group	September 12–15, 2014	544	± 4.2%	48%	40%	—	12%
New England College	September 10–11, 2014	630	± 3.98%	51%	36%	4%	9%
Rasmussen Reports	September 10–11, 2014	750	± 4%	51%	40%	3%	6%
CBS News/NYT/YouGov	August 18–September 2, 2014	1,159	± 4%	51%	34%	3%	13%
WMUR/UNH	August 7–17, 2014	609	± 4%	49%	32%	1%	18%
National Research/RGA	August 10–13, 2014	600	± 4%	42%	37%	1%	18%
CBS News/NYT/YouGov	July 5–24, 2014	1,246	± 2.9%	53%	38%	2%	7%
WMUR/UNH	June 19–July 1, 2014	669	± 3.8%	58%	29%	1%	10%
Suffolk/Boston Herald	June 14–18, 2014	800	± 3.5%	51%	19%	3%	28%
American Research Group	June 14–18, 2014	540	± 4.2%	45%	32%	—	23%
Vox Populi Polling	May 14–15, 2014	707	± 3.6%	43%	30%	—	27%
Rockefeller Center	April 21–25, 2014	412	± 4.8%	40%	19%	—	41%
WMUR/UNH	April 1–9, 2014	387	± 5%	49%	19%	2%	30%

Hypothetical polling

Poll source	Date(s) administered	Sample size	Margin of error	Maggie Hassan (D)	Bill Binnie (R)	Other	Undecided
Suffolk/Boston Herald	Feb. 27–Mar. 5, 2014	800	± 3.5%	55%	26%	—	20%
Public Policy Polling	January 9–12, 2014	1,354	± 2.7%	51%	31%	—	18%

Poll source	Date(s) administered	Sample size	Margin of error	Maggie Hassan (D)	Jeb Bradley (R)	Other	Undecided
New England College	May 2–5, 2013	807	± 3.27%	55%	24%	—	22%
Public Policy Polling	April 19–21, 2013	933	± 3.2%	52%	38%	—	10%

Poll source	Date(s) administered	Sample size	Margin of error	Maggie Hassan (D)	Brad Cook (R)	Other	Undecided
Public Policy Polling	September 13–16, 2013	1,038	± 3%	49%	34%	—	17%

Poll source	Date(s) administered	Sample size	Margin of error	Maggie Hassan (D)	Ted Gatsas (R)	Other	Undecided
WMUR/UNH	April 1–9, 2014	387	± 5%	50%	27%	1%	23%
Suffolk/Boston Herald	Feb. 27–Mar. 5, 2014	800	± 3.5%	53%	28%	—	19%
WMUR/UNH	January 21–26, 2014	584	± 4.1%	45%	34%	2%	19%
New England College	October 7–9, 2013	1,063	± 3%	53%	25%	—	22%
Public Policy Polling	April 19–21, 2013	933	± 3.2%	51%	35%	—	15%

Poll source	Date(s) administered	Sample size	Margin of error	Maggie Hassan (D)	Daniel Greene (R)	Other	Undecided
Suffolk/Boston Herald	June 14–18, 2014	800	± 3.5%	53%	13%	4%	31%

Poll source	Date(s) administered	Sample size	Margin of error	Maggie Hassan (D)	Frank Guinta (R)	Other	Undecided
Public Policy Polling	April 19–21, 2013	933	± 3.2%	54%	36%	—	9%

Poll source	Date(s) administered	Sample size	Margin of error	Maggie Hassan (D)	Andrew Hemingway (R)	Other	Undecided
WMUR/UNH	August 7–17, 2014	609	± 4%	51%	31%	1%	17%
WMUR/UNH	June 19–July 1, 2014	669	± 3.8%	54%	28%	0%	18%
Suffolk/Boston Herald	June 14–18, 2014	800	± 3.5%	51%	17%	3%	29%
Vox Populi Polling	May 14–15, 2014	707	± 3.6%	42%	31%	—	27%
Hickman Analytics	April 24–30, 2014	400	± 4.9%	50%	28%	—	22%
Rockefeller Center	April 21–25, 2014	412	± 4.8%	40%	20%	—	40%
WMUR/UNH	April 1–9, 2014	387	± 5%	49%	22%	1%	28%
American Research Group	March 13–16, 2014	533	± 4.2%	45%	30%	—	25%
Suffolk/Boston Herald	Feb. 27–Mar. 5, 2014	800	± 3.5%	56%	23%	—	21%
WMUR/UNH	January 21–26, 2014	584	± 4.1%	48%	27%	2%	22%
Public Policy Polling	January 9–12, 2014	1,354	± 2.7%	51%	25%	—	23%

Poll source	Date(s) administered	Sample size	Margin of error	Maggie Hassan (D)	George Lambert (R)	Other	Undecided
Suffolk/Boston Herald	Feb. 27–Mar. 5, 2014	800	± 3.5%	55%	22%	—	23%
Public Policy Polling	January 9–12, 2014	1,354	± 2.7%	50%	26%	—	23%
Public Policy Polling	September 13–16, 2013	1,038	± 3%	49%	32%	—	20%

Poll source	Date(s) administered	Sample size	Margin of error	Maggie Hassan (D)	Chuck Morse (R)	Other	Undecided
Suffolk/Boston Herald	Feb. 27–Mar. 5, 2014	800	± 3.5%	56%	23%	—	21%
Public Policy Polling	January 9–12, 2014	1,354	± 2.7%	50%	27%	—	22%
Public Policy Polling	September 13–16, 2013	1,038	± 3%	49%	33%	—	18%

Poll source	Date(s) administered	Sample size	Margin of error	Maggie Hassan (D)	Andy Sanborn (R)	Other	Undecided
Public Policy Polling	September 13–16, 2013	1,038	± 3%	49%	32%	—	19%

Poll source	Date(s) administered	Sample size	Margin of error	Maggie Hassan (D)	Kevin Smith (R)	Other	Undecided
Public Policy Polling	April 19–21, 2013	933	± 3.2%	52%	32%	—	16%

Poll source	Date(s) administered	Sample size	Margin of error	Maggie Hassan (D)	Jonathan Smolin (R)	Other	Undecided
Suffolk/Boston Herald	June 14–18, 2014	800	± 3.5%	52%	15%	3%	31%

Poll source	Date(s) administered	Sample size	Margin of error	Maggie Hassan (D)	Christopher T. Sununu (R)	Other	Undecided
Public Policy Polling	April 19–21, 2013	933	± 3.2%	53%	37%	—	10%

=== Results ===

2014 New Hampshire gubernatorial election
Party	Candidate	Votes	%	±%
Democratic	Maggie Hassan (incumbent)	254,666	52.37%	−2.24%
Republican	Walt Havenstein	230,610	47.43%	+4.91%
Write-in		976	0.20%	+0.10%
Total votes		486,183	100.00%	N/A
Democratic hold				

==== By county ====
2014 Senate election results in New Hampshire (by county)
County	Maggie Hassan Democratic		Walt Havenstein Republican		Other votes	
	#	%	#	%	#	%
Belknap	11,069	46.7%	12,603	53.1%	41	0.2%
Carroll	10,332	50.0%	10,316	49.9%	32	0.2%
Cheshire	16,440	60.6%	10,611	39.1%	73	0.3%
Coös	6,429	60.7%	4,151	39.2%	15	0.1%
Grafton	20,155	60.9%	12,884	38.9%	69	0.2%
Hillsborough	67,525	49.0%	70,041	50.8%	327	0.2%
Merrimack	32,365	56.7%	24,608	43.1%	127	0.2%
Rockingham	57,743	48.7%	60,538	51.1%	170	0.1%
Strafford	24,032	57.0%	18,026	42.8%	98	0.2%
Sullivan	8,576	55.6%	6,832	44.3%	24	0.2%

Counties that swung from Democratic to Republican

- Belknap (largest city: Laconia)
- Hillsborough (largest municipality: Manchester)
- Rockingham (largest municipality: Derry)

==== By congressional district ====
Hassan won both congressional districts, including one that elected a Republican.

District	Hassan	Havenstein	Representative
1st	50.86%	49.14%	Frank Guinta
2nd	54.11%	45.89%	Annie Kuster
