= 2014 United States House of Representatives elections in New Hampshire =

- November 4, 2014

All 2 New Hampshire seats to the United States House of Representatives
| | Majority party | Minority party |
|---|---|---|
| Party | Democratic | Republican |
| Last election | 2 | 0 |
| Seats won | 1 | 1 |
| Seat change | ▼1 | ▲1 |
| Popular vote | 247,469 | 232,379 |
| Percentage | 51.46% | 48.38% |
| Swing | ▲1.50% | ▲2.72% |

Democratic
50–60%
60–70%
70–80%
80–90%
90–100%
Republican
50–60%
60–70%
90–100%
Tie
40–50%

The 2014 United States House of Representatives elections in New Hampshire were held on Tuesday, November 4, 2014, to elect the two U.S. representatives from the state of New Hampshire, one from each of the state's two congressional districts. The elections coincided with the elections of other federal and state offices, including governor of New Hampshire and U.S. senator. This election marked the first time since 1992 that New Hampshire elected members of two parties into the House of Representatives, and is to date the only time since 2010 that Republicans won any congressional election in New Hampshire.

== Overview ==
Results of the 2014 United States House of Representatives elections in New Hampshire by district:

| District | Democratic | | Republican | | Others | | Total | | Result |
| District | Votes | % | Votes | % | Votes | % | Votes | % | Result |
|---|---|---|---|---|---|---|---|---|---|
| District 1 | 116,769 | 48.11% | 125,508 | 51.71% | 459 | 0.19% | 242,736 | 100.0% | Republican gain |
| District 2 | 130,700 | 55.54% | 106,871 | 42.18% | 613 | 2.27% | 238,184 | 100.0% | Democratic hold |
| Total | 247,469 | 51.46% | 232,379 | 48.32% | 1,072 | 0.22% | 480,920 | 100.0% | |

== District 1 ==
2014 New Hampshire's 1st congressional district election
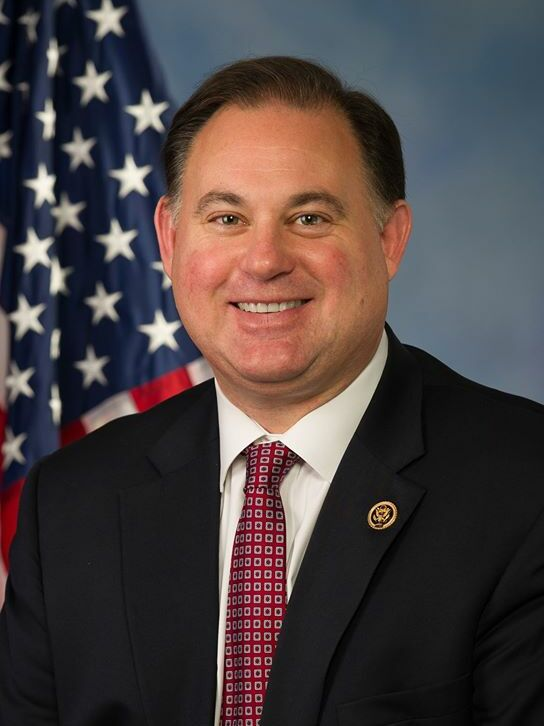

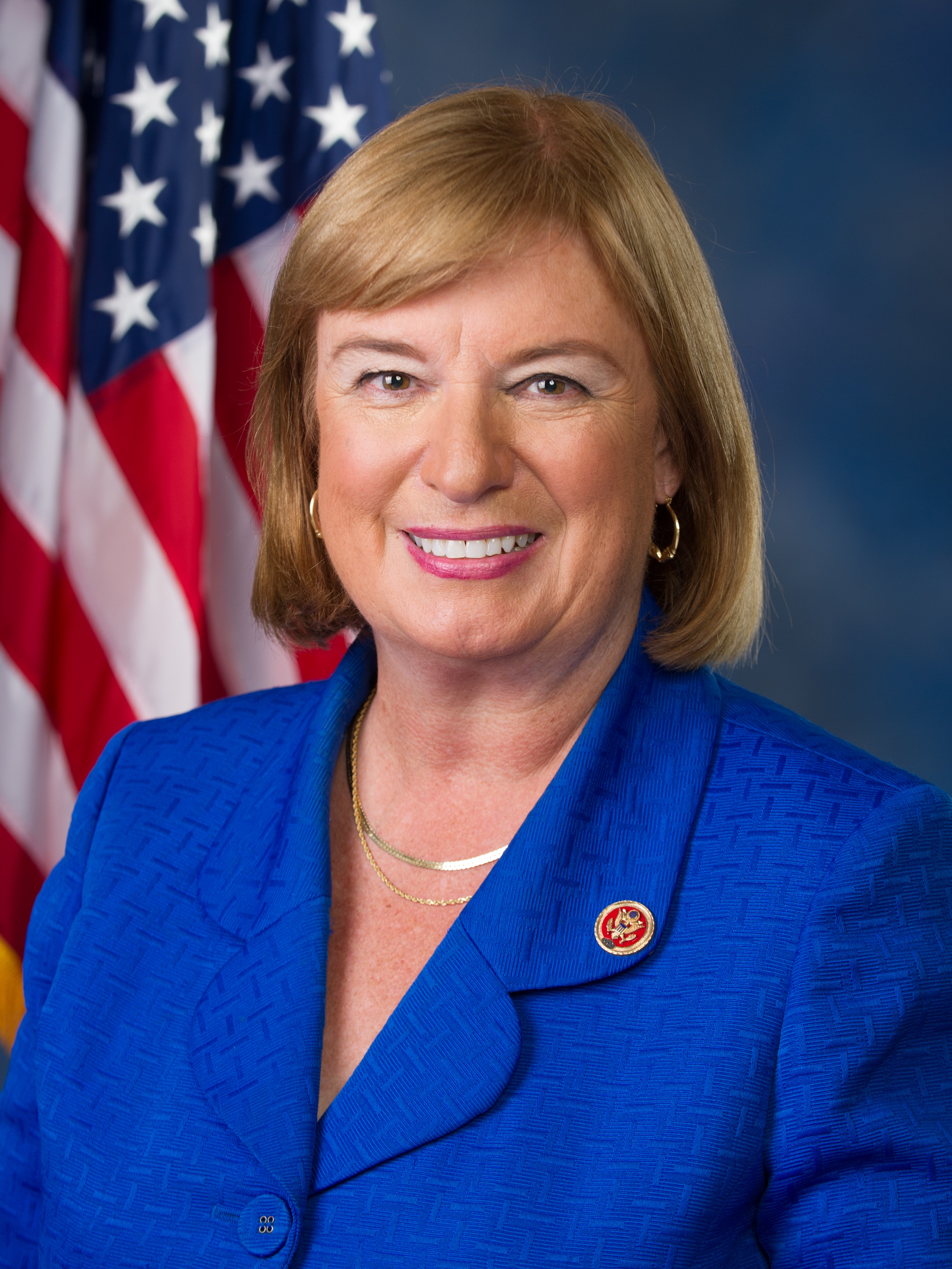
| Nominee | Frank Guinta | Carol Shea-Porter |
| Party | Republican | Democratic |
| Popular vote | 125,508 | 116,769 |
| Percentage | 51.7% | 48.1% |
- Municipality results Guinta: 40–50% 50–60% 60–70% 70–80% Shea-Porter: 50–60% 60–70% 80–90%
U.S. Representative before election
Carol Shea-Porter
Democratic
Elected U.S. Representative
Frank Guinta
Republican

The 1st district covers the southeastern part of the state and consists of three general areas: Greater Manchester, the Seacoast and the Lakes Region. The incumbent Democrat Carol Shea-Porter, who has represented the district since 2013 and previously from 2007 to 2011, ran for re-election. She was elected with 50% of the vote in 2012, defeating Republican incumbent Frank Guinta, and the district has a PVI of R+1.

=== Democratic primary ===
==== Candidates ====
===== Nominee =====
- Carol Shea-Porter, incumbent U.S. Representative

==== Results ====
Democratic primary results
| Party | Candidate | Votes | % |
|---|---|---|---|
| Democratic | Carol Shea-Porter (incumbent) | 16,956 | 98.1 |
| Democratic | Write-ins | 327 | 1.9 |
| Total votes | | 17,283 | 100 |

=== Republican primary ===
==== Candidates ====
===== Nominee =====
- Frank Guinta, former U.S. Representative

===== Eliminated in primary =====
- Daniel Innis, Dean of the Peter T. Paul College of Business and Economics at the University of New Hampshire
- Everett Jabour, trucking executive
- Brendan Kelly, former Seabrook Selectman, former chairman of the Libertarian Party of New Hampshire, and Libertarian nominee for this seat in 2012

===== Declined =====
- Jeb Bradley, Majority Leader of the New Hampshire Senate and former U.S. Representative
- John Cebrowski, state representative
- Christopher Sununu, Executive Councillor (running for re-election)
- Pam Tucker, state representative

==== Polling ====
| Poll source | Date(s) administered | Sample size | Margin of error | Jeff Chidester | Frank Guinta | Dan Innis | Undecided |
|---|---|---|---|---|---|---|---|
| New England College | October 7–9, 2013 | 409 | ± 4.8% | 7% | 54% | 6% | 33% |

==== Results ====
Republican primary results
| Party | Candidate | Votes | % |
|---|---|---|---|
| Republican | Frank Guinta | 29,246 | 49.0 |
| Republican | Dan Innis | 24,342 | 40.8 |
| Republican | Brendan Kelly | 4,999 | 8.4 |
| Republican | Everett Jabour | 996 | 1.7 |
| Republican | Write-ins | 123 | 0.2 |
| Total votes | | 59,706 | 100.0 |

=== General election ===
==== Polling ====
| Poll source | Date(s) administered | Sample size | Margin of error | Carol Shea-Porter (D) | Frank Guinta (R) | Other | Undecided |
|---|---|---|---|---|---|---|---|
| WMUR/UNH | October 29–November 2, 2014 | 405 | ± 4.9% | 47% | 47% | 1% | 6% |
| New England College | October 31–November 1, 2014 | 778 | ± 3.51% | 43% | 52% | 2% | 3% |
| WMUR/UNH | October 22–26, 2014 | 261 | ± 6.1% | 44% | 40% | 1% | 15% |
| New England College | October 24, 2014 | 556 | ± 4.16% | 43% | 49% | 4% | 4% |
| New England College | October 16, 2014 | 461 | ± 4.56% | 46% | 47% | 3% | 3% |
| UMass Amherst | October 10–15, 2014 | 160 LV | – | 54% | 37% | 3% | 6% |
| UMass Amherst | October 10–15, 2014 | 197 RV | – | 50% | 38% | 3% | 9% |
| New England College | October 9, 2014 | 536 | ± 4.23% | 44% | 46% | 6% | 5% |
| WMUR/UNH | September 29–October 5, 2014 | 258 | ± 6.1% | 42% | 39% | 3% | 16% |
| New England College | October 3, 2014 | 626 | ± 3.92% | 47% | 44% | 5% | 4% |
| New England College | September 26, 2014 | 629 | ± 3.91% | 41% | 51% | 4% | 4% |
| New England College | September 19–20, 2014 | 715 | ± 3.66% | 45% | 45% | 6% | 4% |
| New England College | September 10–11, 2014 | 607 | ± 3.98% | 46% | 42% | 6% | 6% |
| Normington Petts | September 3–7, 2014 | 800 | ± 3.5% | 45% | 43% | — | 12% |
| WMUR/UNH | August 7–17, 2014 | 297 | ± 5.7% | 41% | 45% | — | 14% |
| WMUR/UNH | June 19–July 1, 2014 | 263 | ± 6% | 43% | 46% | 2% | 10% |
| WMUR/UNH | April 1–9, 2014 | 259 | ± 6.1% | 44% | 35% | 0% | 21% |
| WMUR/UNH | January 21–26, 2014 | 304 | ± 5.6% | 39% | 45% | 2% | 15% |
| WMUR/UNH | October 7–16, 2013 | 330 | ± 5.4% | 48% | 32% | 1% | 18% |
| New England College | October 7–9, 2013 | 882 | ± 3.29% | 43% | 42% | — | 15% |

Hypothetical polling

| Poll source | Date(s) administered | Sample size | Margin of error | Carol Shea-Porter (D) | Dan Innis (R) | Other | Undecided |
|---|---|---|---|---|---|---|---|
| WMUR/UNH | August 7–17, 2014 | 297 | ± 5.7% | 44% | 37% | 1% | 18% |
| WMUR/UNH | June 19–July 1, 2014 | 263 | ± 6% | 45% | 38% | 1% | 16% |
| WMUR/UNH | April 1–9, 2014 | 259 | ± 6.1% | 45% | 29% | 0% | 25% |
| WMUR/UNH | January 21–26, 2014 | 304 | ± 5.6% | 43% | 33% | 2% | 23% |
| WMUR/UNH | October 7–16, 2013 | 330 | ± 5.4% | 43% | 32% | 0% | 25% |

==== Predictions ====
| Source | Ranking | As of |
|---|---|---|
| The Cook Political Report | Tossup | November 3, 2014 |
| Rothenberg | Tilt D | October 24, 2014 |
| Sabato's Crystal Ball | Lean R (flip) | October 30, 2014 |
| RCP | Tossup | November 2, 2014 |
| Daily Kos Elections | Tossup | November 4, 2014 |

==== Results ====
New Hampshire's 1st congressional district, 2014
| Party | Candidate | Votes | % |
|---|---|---|---|
| Republican | Frank Guinta | 125,508 | 51.7 |
| Democratic | Carol Shea-Porter (incumbent) | 116,769 | 48.1 |
| n/a | Write-ins | 459 | 0.2 |
| Total votes | | 242,736 | 100.0 |
| Republican gain from Democratic | | | |

== District 2 ==
2014 New Hampshire's 2nd congressional district election
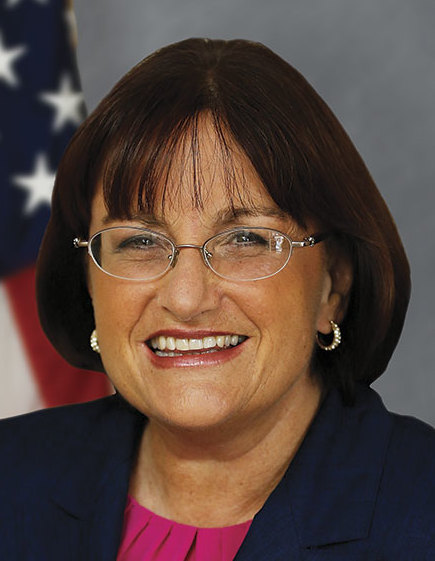

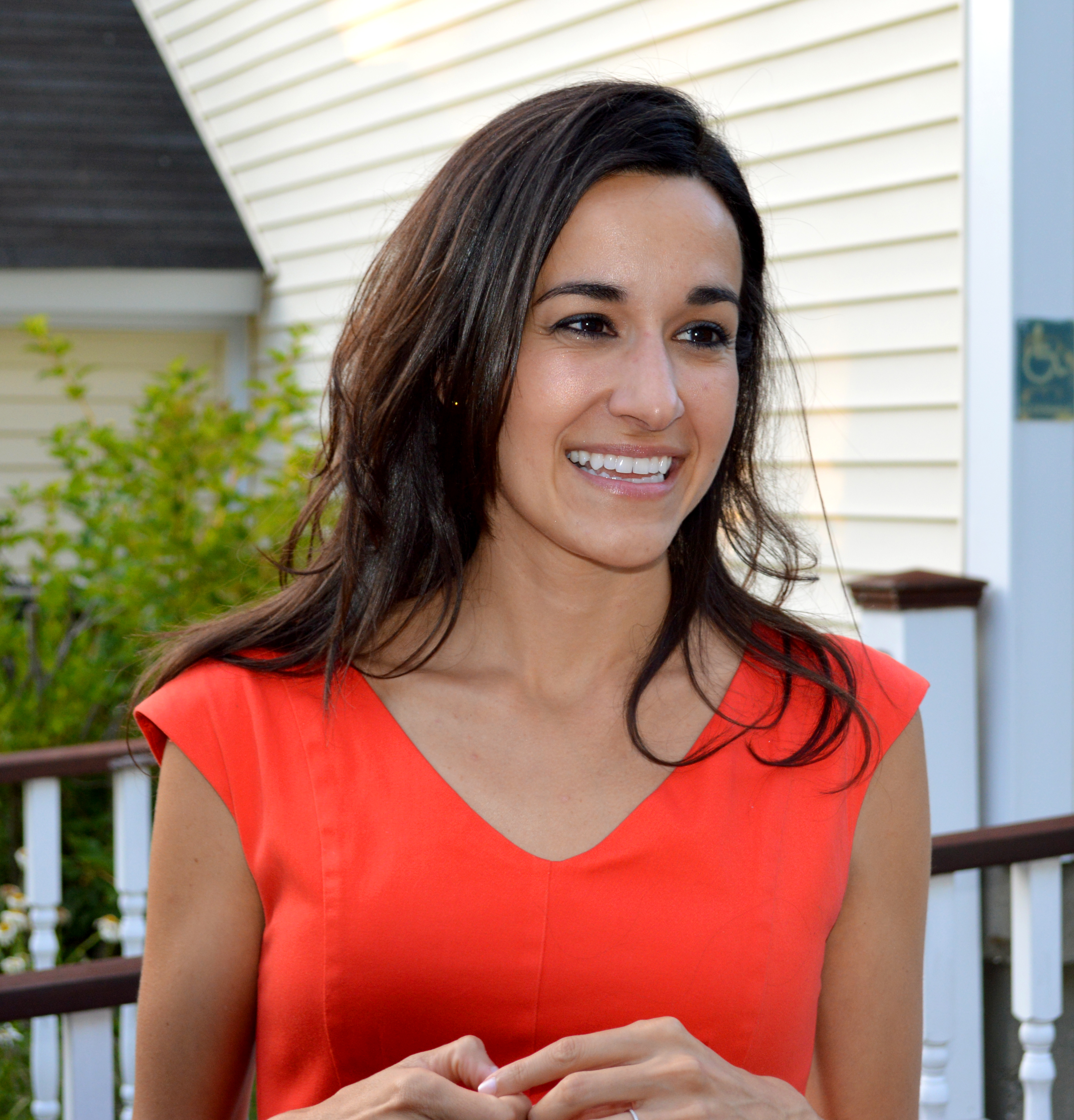
| Nominee | Ann McLane Kuster | Marilinda Garcia |
| Party | Democratic | Republican |
| Popular vote | 130,700 | 106,871 |
| Percentage | 54.9% | 44.9% |
- Municipality results Kuster: 50–60% 60–70% 70–80% 90–100% Garcia: 50–60% 60–70% 80–90% Tie (40–50%) No votes
U.S. Representative before election
Ann McLane Kuster
Democratic
Elected U.S. Representative
Ann McLane Kuster
Democratic

The 2nd district covers the western and northern parts of the state and includes the cities of Nashua and Concord. The incumbent Democrat Ann McLane Kuster, who has represented the district since 2013, ran for re-election. She was elected with 50% of the vote in 2012, defeating Republican incumbent Charles Bass, and the district has a PVI of D+3.

=== Democratic primary ===
==== Candidates ====
===== Nominee =====
- Ann McLane Kuster, incumbent U.S. Representative

==== Results ====
Democratic primary results
| Party | Candidate | Votes | % |
|---|---|---|---|
| Democratic | Ann McLane Kuster (incumbent) | 21,269 | 98.6 |
| Democratic | Write-ins | 300 | 1.4 |
| Total votes | | 21,569 | 100.0 |

=== Republican primary ===
==== Candidates ====
===== Nominee =====
- Marilinda Garcia, state representative

===== Eliminated in primary =====
- Gary Lambert, former state senator
- Jim Lawrence, former state representative
- Mike Little, former Concord City Councilor

===== Declined =====
- Andrew Hemingway, businessman, Tea Party activist and candidate for chairman of the New Hampshire Republican State Committee in 2013 (running for Governor)
- William L. O'Brien, former Speaker of the New Hampshire House of Representatives
- Christopher Sununu, Executive Councillor (running for re-election)

==== Polling ====
| Poll source | Date(s) administered | Sample size | Margin of error | Marilinda Garcia | Gary Lambert | Jim Lawrence | Mike Little | Undecided |
|---|---|---|---|---|---|---|---|---|
| Magellan Strategies | July 29–30, 2014 | 800 | ± 3.44% | 36% | 13% | 2% | 4% | 45% |

==== Results ====
Republican primary results
| Party | Candidate | Votes | % |
|---|---|---|---|
| Republican | Marilinda Garcia | 27,285 | 49.2 |
| Republican | Gary Lambert | 15,196 | 27.4 |
| Republican | Jim Lawrence | 10,327 | 18.6 |
| Republican | Mike Little | 2,489 | 4.5 |
| Republican | Write-ins | 165 | 0.12 |
| Total votes | | 55,462 | 100.0 |

=== General election ===
==== Polling ====
| Poll source | Date(s) administered | Sample size | Margin of error | Ann McLane Kuster (D) | Marilinda Garcia (R) | Other | Undecided |
|---|---|---|---|---|---|---|---|
| WMUR/UNH | October 29–November 2, 2014 | 352 | ± 5.2% | 49% | 38% | 1% | 12% |
| New England College | October 31–November 1, 2014 | 748 | ± 3.58% | 53% | 42% | 3% | 2% |
| WMUR/UNH | October 22–26, 2014 | 295 | ± 5.7% | 53% | 30% | 1% | 16% |
| New England College | October 24, 2014 | 576 | ± 4.08% | 49% | 42% | 4% | 5% |
| New England College | October 16, 2014 | 460 | ± 4.57% | 49% | 43% | 4% | 4% |
| UMass Amherst | October 10–15, 2014 | 162 LV | ± ? | 43% | 48% | 4% | 5% |
| UMass Amherst | October 10–15, 2014 | 198 RV | ± ? | 45% | 43% | 4% | 8% |
| New England College | October 9, 2014 | 545 | ± 4.2% | 46% | 43% | 7% | 5% |
| WMUR/UNH | September 29–October 5, 2014 | 275 | ± 5.9% | 37% | 41% | 3% | 19% |
| New England College | October 3, 2014 | 660 | ± 3.81% | 50% | 38% | 6% | 5% |
| New England College | September 26, 2014 | 702 | ± 3.7% | 50% | 39% | 5% | 6% |
| New England College | September 19–20, 2014 | 779 | ± 3.51% | 49% | 38% | 7% | 6% |
| New England College | September 10–11, 2014 | 627 | ± 3.98% | 50% | 37% | 6% | 8% |
| Normington Petts | September 3–7, 2014 | 800 | ± 3.5% | 44% | 38% | — | 18% |
| WMUR/UNH | August 7–17, 2014 | 312 | ± 5.5% | 39% | 36% | 1% | 25% |
| WMUR/UNH | June 19–July 1, 2014 | 246 | ± 6.2% | 49% | 35% | 1% | 15% |
| WMUR/UNH | April 1–9, 2014 | 248 | ± 6.2% | 34% | 33% | 1% | 32% |
| WMUR/UNH | January 21–26, 2014 | 280 | ± 5.9% | 36% | 30% | 4% | 30% |

Hypothetical polling

| Poll source | Date(s) administered | Sample size | Margin of error | Ann McLane Kuster (D) | Gary Lambert (R) | Other | Undecided |
|---|---|---|---|---|---|---|---|
| WMUR/UNH | August 7–17, 2014 | 312 | ± 5.5% | 41% | 35% | 1% | 24% |
| WMUR/UNH | June 19–July 1, 2014 | 246 | ± 6.2% | 45% | 36% | 1% | 18% |
| WMUR/UNH | April 1–9, 2014 | 248 | ± 6.2% | 38% | 31% | 1% | 30% |
| WMUR/UNH | January 21–26, 2014 | 280 | ± 5.9% | 38% | 34% | 2% | 26% |
| WMUR/UNH | October 7–16, 2013 | 333 | ± 5.4% | 33% | 34% | 2% | 31% |
| New England College | October 7–9, 2013 | 569 | ± 4.13% | 46% | 26% | — | 28% |

| Poll source | Date(s) administered | Sample size | Margin of error | Ann McLane Kuster (D) | Jim Lawrence (R) | Other | Undecided |
|---|---|---|---|---|---|---|---|
| WMUR/UNH | August 7–17, 2014 | 312 | ± 5.5% | 40% | 32% | 2% | 26% |
| WMUR/UNH | June 19–July 1, 2014 | 246 | ± 6.2% | 47% | 35% | 1% | 17% |

==== Predictions ====
| Source | Ranking | As of |
|---|---|---|
| The Cook Political Report | Lean D | November 3, 2014 |
| Rothenberg | Lean D | October 24, 2014 |
| Sabato's Crystal Ball | Lean D | October 30, 2014 |
| RCP | Lean D | November 2, 2014 |
| Daily Kos Elections | Lean D | November 4, 2014 |

==== Results ====
New Hampshire's 2nd congressional district, 2014
| Party | Candidate | Votes | % |
|---|---|---|---|
| Democratic | Ann McLane Kuster (incumbent) | 130,700 | 54.9 |
| Republican | Marilinda Garcia | 106,871 | 44.9 |
| n/a | Write-ins | 613 | 0.2 |
| Total votes | | 238,184 | 100.0 |
| Democratic hold | | | |

== See also ==
- 2014 United States House of Representatives elections
- 2014 United States elections
