= Eric Estevez =

American politician

Member of New Hampshire House of Representatives for Hillsborough 37
- In office 2014–2016

Personal details
- Party: Republican
- Education: Barry University; Northeastern University

Eric P. Estevez is an American politician. He was a member of the New Hampshire House of Representatives and represented Hillsborough 37th district from 2014 to 2016.

== Career ==
Estevez was a Republican candidate for New Hampshire's 2nd congressional district at the 2016 United States House of Representatives election. Estevez is the economic mobility program manager for the city of Gainesville, Florida.
