= Bianca Garcia =

American politician

Member of the New Hampshire House of Representatives from the Rockingham 8th district
- In office December 5, 2012 – December 3, 2014

Personal details
- Born: June 1986 (age 40)
- Party: Republican
- Education: Curtis Institute of Music; New England Conservatory of Music
- Occupation: Musician

Bianca Rose Garcia (born June 1986) is an American politician from the state of New Hampshire. A Republican, she served in the New Hampshire House of Representatives from 2012 through 2014.

== Biography ==
Garcia graduated from the Curtis Institute of Music in 2006 with a bachelor's degree. She then enrolled at the New England Conservatory of Music, receiving her master's degree in 2008. She was a Fulbright Scholar in 2009, and studied in Rome.

Garcia plays the flute in "The Seraphim Duo" with Marilinda Garcia, her sister and a fellow former New Hampshire representative, who plays the harp.
