= Frank Guinta =

American politician (born 1970)

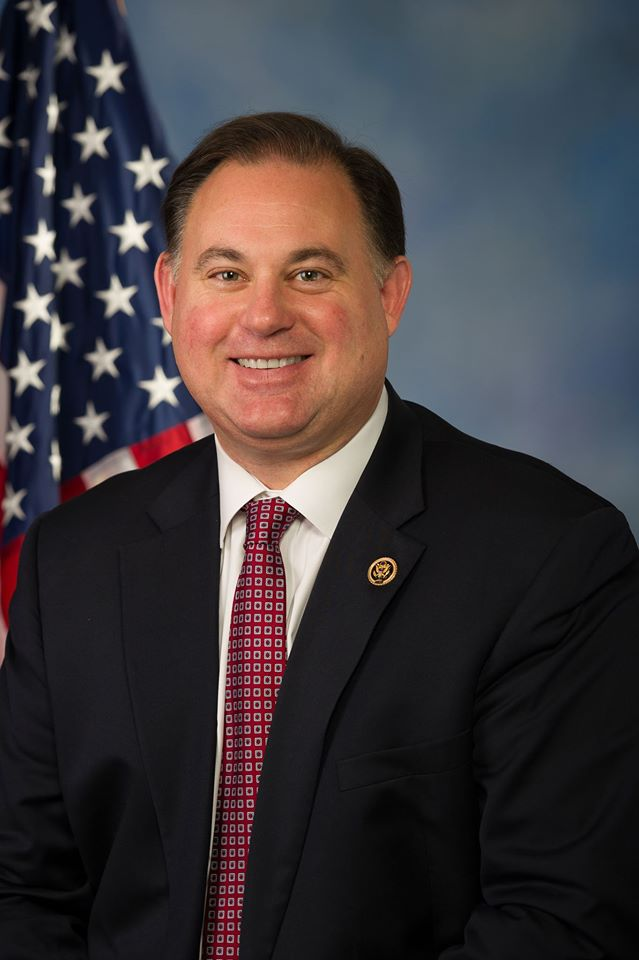
- Official portrait, 2015

Member of the U.S. House of Representatives from New Hampshire's 1st district
- In office January 3, 2015 – January 3, 2017
- Preceded by: Carol Shea-Porter
- Succeeded by: Carol Shea-Porter
- In office January 3, 2011 – January 3, 2013
- Preceded by: Carol Shea-Porter
- Succeeded by: Carol Shea-Porter

54th Mayor of Manchester
- In office January 3, 2006 – January 3, 2010
- Preceded by: Robert A. Baines
- Succeeded by: Ted Gatsas

Personal details
- Born: Frank Christopher Guinta; September 26, 1970 (age 56) Edison, New Jersey, U.S.
- Party: Republican
- Spouse: Morgan Smith
- Education: Assumption College (BA); University of New Hampshire, Concord (MA)

Frank Christopher Guinta (born September 26, 1970) is an American businessman and politician who represented New Hampshire's 1st congressional district in the United States House of Representatives from 2011 to 2013 and 2015 to 2017. A member of the Republican Party, he previously served as the mayor of Manchester, New Hampshire, from 2006 to 2010. He is identified by National Journal as a moderate.

Guinta worked in the insurance industry before being elected to the New Hampshire House of Representatives, where he served the 39th Hillsborough district from December 5, 2000 to December 4, 2002 and the 50th Hillsborough district from December 4, 2002 to December 6, 2004; he also served as a Manchester alderman from January 3, 2002 to January 3, 2006. He resigned from the State House in 2004 to work as senior policy adviser to Republican Congressman Jeb Bradley. In 2005, he ran for mayor of Manchester and defeated three-term Democratic incumbent Robert A. Baines. He was re-elected in 2007 but did not run for a third term in 2009. Instead, he ran for Congress in 2010, defeating Democratic incumbent Carol Shea-Porter. In a rematch in 2012, Shea-Porter defeated Guinta to reclaim the seat. Guinta defeated Shea-Porter for a second time in 2014. Shea-Porter defeated Guinta on November 8, 2016, to win back the seat. He is the most recent Republican to serve New Hampshire in the U.S. House of Representatives, and alongside Kelly Ayotte is the most recent Republican to represent New Hampshire in Congress.

== Early life, education, and business career ==
Guinta, the son of Richard and Virginia Guinta, was born in Edison, New Jersey, in 1970. He graduated from the Canterbury School, a Catholic boarding school in New Milford, Connecticut, and Assumption College, a four-year liberal arts college in Worcester, Massachusetts (where he met his wife, Morgan).

After their marriage, the couple moved to Boston, where Guinta worked for Travelers Insurance and other entities in the insurance industry. He also began his own insurance consulting firm. He then attended Franklin Pierce Law Center in New Hampshire, where he earned a master's degree in intellectual property.

== Early political career ==
On November 7, 2000, Guinta was elected to a seat in the New Hampshire House of Representatives, representing Manchester. He was re-elected on November 5, 2002.

In 2001, Guinta ran for the post of alderman from Manchester's Ward 3. In the non-partisan municipal primary election held on September 1, 2001, Guinta and George Skilioganis were the two top vote-getters in Ward 3, with 375 and 279 votes, respectively, securing them a place on the November ballot. On November 6, 2001, Guinta defeated Skilioganis by a vote of 630 to 522 in the general election.

Two years later, incumbent alderman Guinta and challenger Glenn R.J. Ouellette, a runner-up in the 2001 primary, faced no opposition in the primary. In the November 3, 2003, general election, Guinta beat Ouellete 452 to 324. While serving as alderman, Guinta was one of the few Republicans on the 14-member Board of Aldermen. The mayor of Manchester during Guinta's tenure on the board, Robert A. Baines, also was a Democrat.

In 2004, Guinta resigned his House seat to take a position as senior policy adviser to U.S. Congressman Jeb Bradley, who preceded Carol Shea-Porter as the U.S. representative for New Hampshire's first district. Guinta held the post until March 2005, when he resigned to campaign for mayor of Manchester. Guinta was taking on Mayor Baines, a three-term mayor who had won two-thirds of the vote in the 2003 general election, who was seeking a fourth term.

== Mayor of Manchester ==
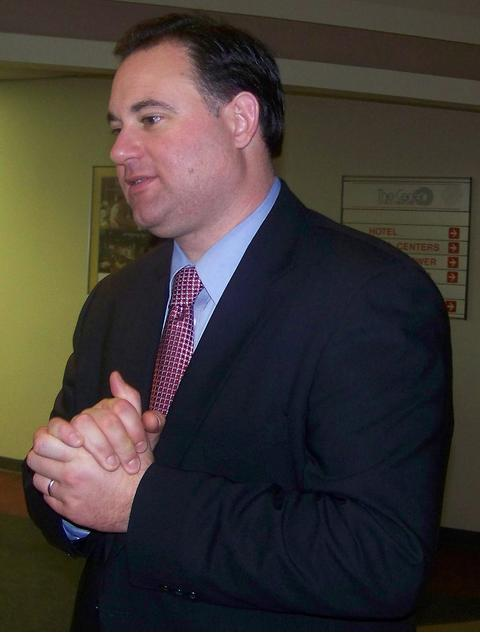
Mayor Guinta in 2008

In the non-partisan primary held on September 5, 2005, Guinta placed second in a three-candidate field, garnering 3,760 votes to Baines' 5,168. (Jeff Kassel received 651 votes.) On November 8, 2005, Guinta defeated Baines in the general election by 528 votes (10,125 to 9,597), becoming Manchester's youngest mayor in over 100 years. He ran on a platform of improving education, increasing public safety and security, revitalizing Manchester's neighborhoods, promoting fiscal responsibility, and reducing property tax rates. He was inaugurated on January 3, 2006.

During Guinta's first term as mayor, the city raised the complement of Manchester's police force by 22 officers to 225 and added a police substation on Manchester's west side. Guinta also tackled violence at local nightclubs. In 2006, at the urging of Guinta, neighbors, and other city officials concerned about violent crime, the state Liquor Commission refused to renew the liquor licenses for clubs Omega, Envy and Fish, resulting in their closure. Guinta emphasized community policing and cooperation between law enforcement and the community. With regards to taxes and spending, Guinta takes credit for Manchester's first tax cut in a decade.

Guinta was elected to a second term as mayor on November 6, 2007, defeating Democrat Thomas Donovan, a former school board member. Guinta received the backing of the New Hampshire Union Leader during his re-election bid. The paper's editorial board praised Guinta as "a tax-cutting crime fighter...[who] has pushed bureaucratic reform and improved services."

In June 2009, Mayor Guinta announced his plan to lower property taxes by reducing school funding by 7 million dollars. Guinta explained his budget by telling WMUR-TV, "We've got to find ways to be more effective, more efficient so we can keep money in taxpayers' and property owners' pockets."

Guinta did not run for re-election in 2009. In the election to determine his successor, Republican Alderman and State Senator Ted Gatsas defeated Democratic alderman Mark Roy.

== U.S. House of Representatives ==
=== Elections ===
==== 2010 ====
Guinta's Democratic opponent, incumbent Carol Shea-Porter, had represented New Hampshire's 1st congressional district for two terms. The race received national attention because some analysts had rated it as one of the best chances for a Republican pick-up in New England in 2010.

In April 2009, Guinta announced that he would run for higher office rather than for a third term as mayor. In May 2009, he filed papers and announced his candidacy for the House. On September 14, 2010, he won the Republican primary election. On November 2, 2010, Guinta defeated incumbent Shea-Porter by a margin of 54% to 42%.

===== Illegal campaign contributions =====
In October 2010, the New Hampshire Democratic Party filed complaints with the Federal Election Commission and the Clerk of the House concerning $355,000 Guinta loaned to his own campaign from a bank account that had not been disclosed in any previous financial statements, including those filed during his time as mayor of Manchester. The issue was first raised by Guinta's fellow Republicans during the Republican primary. Guinta dismissed speculation that the money represented an illegal campaign donation, stating that the money came from his own earnings and savings but refusing to make public the related bank statements. On December 15, 2011, the general counsel for the U.S. House Committee on Standards of Official Conduct informed Guinta that the committee reviewed his candidate financial disclosure reports "and subsequent amendments thereto, and have determined that they are in substantial compliance" with federal ethics law.

In May 2015, Guinta settled the case with the Federal Election Commission involving $355,000 that had been donated to him by his parents during his first House campaign in 2010. The settlement required him to return the donation and pay a $15,000 fine to the FEC. New Hampshire politicians including U.S. Senator Kelly Ayotte (R) called on Guinta to resign his House seat in light of the incident, but he refused.

==== 2012 ====
Guinta won the 2012 primary election handily, obtaining 84% of the vote against Republican challengers Rick Parent and Vern Clough. Shea-Porter was nominated again by the Democrats to retake the seat, and Brendan Kelly ran on the Libertarian Party ticket. Guinta was defeated by Shea-Porter by a margin of 50% to 46%.

==== 2014 ====
Guinta campaigned to win back the seat he lost in 2012. He formed a joint fundraising committee with Massachusetts Republican and congressional candidate Richard Tisei.

He won the election on November 4, 2014 with 52% of the vote, reclaiming his former seat from Carol Shea-Porter.

==== 2016 ====
Guinta ran for re-election in 2016. He won the Republican primary on September 13, 2016. He faced Democratic nominee Carol Shea-Porter and independent candidate Shawn O'Connor in the general election. Shea-Porter defeated Guinta in the general election with 44.2% of the vote.

=== Policy positions ===
Guinta has worked to place a full-service VA medical facility in New Hampshire and has emphasized veterans' homelessness within the district.

Guinta says he would vote to repeal the Affordable Care Act, though he supports the provisions of the law that protect people with pre-existing conditions and that allow people to stay on their parents' health plans until age 26. Guinta identified mental health funding and reform as a priority for New Hampshire.

Guinta has described the deficit and debt as "a spending problem, not a revenue problem." He has faulted both parties for their role in unsustainable spending, and advocates that spending be cut and made "more effective and efficient". Guinta supports providing tax incentives for small businesses, lowering taxes, and reducing government spending. He has signed the Taxpayer Protection Pledge, a pledge never to increase taxes or revenue. Guinta supports "broad-based" tax reforms that "lower taxes for all Americans", and simplifications to ensure that average Americans can fill out their own tax forms. He supports reforms to automatic spending programs. Guinta has opposed the automatic cuts required by the Budget Control Act of 2011 (the "sequester") that affect defense spending, out of concern for employment at the Portsmouth Naval Shipyard.

Guinta organized multiple job fairs in New Hampshire. One such fair, on November 10, 2011 at Manchester Community College, was oriented toward unemployed veterans; it assembled representatives from 40 employers to discuss employment opportunities, and representatives from one dozen organizations to explain services available to veterans.

On energy, Guinta has favored an "all-of-the-above" energy approach encompassing both fossil fuels and alternative energy sources. Guinta has favored authorization of the Keystone XL Pipeline to expand oil access, help control the price of oil, and create jobs.

On July 22, 2012, CREDO activists, joined by Occupy movement members, staged a protest at Manchester's Northeast Delta Dental Stadium, where Guinta was holding a fund-raiser.

Guinta describes himself as anti-abortion. While in Congress, Guinta voted for the No Taxpayer Funding for Abortion Act.

Guinta says Social Security reform is needed in order to make the program solvent. He has said that said both parties need to negotiate without any preconceived notions.

=== Committee assignments ===
Past

- Committee on Oversight and Government Reform
- Committee on Transportation and Infrastructure
- Committee on Financial Services
  - Subcommittee on Financial Institutions and Consumer Credit
  - Subcommittee on Monetary Policy and Trade
- Committee on the Budget

== Electoral history ==
New Hampshire's First Congressional District General Election, 2010
| Party | Candidate | Votes | % | ±% |
|---|---|---|---|---|
| Republican | Frank Guinta | 121,575 | 54 | |
| Democratic | Carol Shea-Porter (Incumbent) | 95,503 | 42 | |

New Hampshire First Congressional District Republican Primary 2010
| Party | Candidate | Votes | % | ±% |
|---|---|---|---|---|
| Republican | Frank Guinta | 22,237 | 32 | |
| Republican | Sean Mahoney | 19,418 | 28 | |
| Republican | Richard Ashooh | 19,376 | 28 | |
| Republican | Robert Bestani | 5,337 | 8 | |

Manchester Mayoral Election 2007
| Party | Candidate | Votes | % | ±% |
|---|---|---|---|---|
| Republican | Frank Guinta (Incumbent) | 10,381 | 54 | + 3 |
| Democratic | Tom Donovan | 8,894 | 46 | |

Manchester Mayoral Election 2005
| Party | Candidate | Votes | % | ±% |
|---|---|---|---|---|
| Republican | Frank Guinta | 10,125 | 51 | |
| Democratic | Robert A. Baines (Incumbent) | 9,597 | 49 | – 18 |

== Career post-elected office ==
In 2025, the China Railway Rolling Stock Corporation Limited (CRRC) hired Guinta to lobby Homeland Security on their behalf over CRRC's Springfield, Massachusetts rail car plant. The plant is experiencing supply shortages because delivery of shells has been stopped by the Trump administration due to child labor and other forced labor concerns.

== See also ==
- List of mayors of Manchester, New Hampshire

Political offices
| Preceded by Robert A. Baines | Mayor of Manchester; 2006–2010 | Succeeded by Ted Gatsas |
U.S. House of Representatives
| Preceded by Carol Shea-Porter | Member of the U.S. House of Representatives from New Hampshire's 1st congressional district 2011–2013 | Succeeded by Carol Shea-Porter |
| Preceded by Carol Shea-Porter | Member of the U.S. House of Representatives from New Hampshire's 1st congressional district 2015–2017 | Succeeded by Carol Shea-Porter |
U.S. order of precedence (ceremonial)
| Preceded by Paul Hodes as Former U.S. Representative | Order of precedence of the United States as Former U.S. Representative | Succeeded by Ed Schrock as Former U.S. Representative |
