= Jim Lawrence (politician) =

American politician

Jim Lawrence is a former member of the New Hampshire House of Representatives and a graduate of the U.S. Air Force Academy.

Lawrence served three terms in the New Hampshire House. He owns a consulting firm based in Nashua, New Hampshire. He ran against Gary Lambert and Marilinda Garcia for the Republican Party nomination for the New Hampshire's 2nd congressional district in the 2014 elections. He unsuccessfully ran for this seat again in the 2016 elections as the Republican nominee competing against incumbent Democrat Ann McLane Kuster. If elected, he would have been the first black member of Congress from New Hampshire.
