= Marilinda Garcia =

American politician

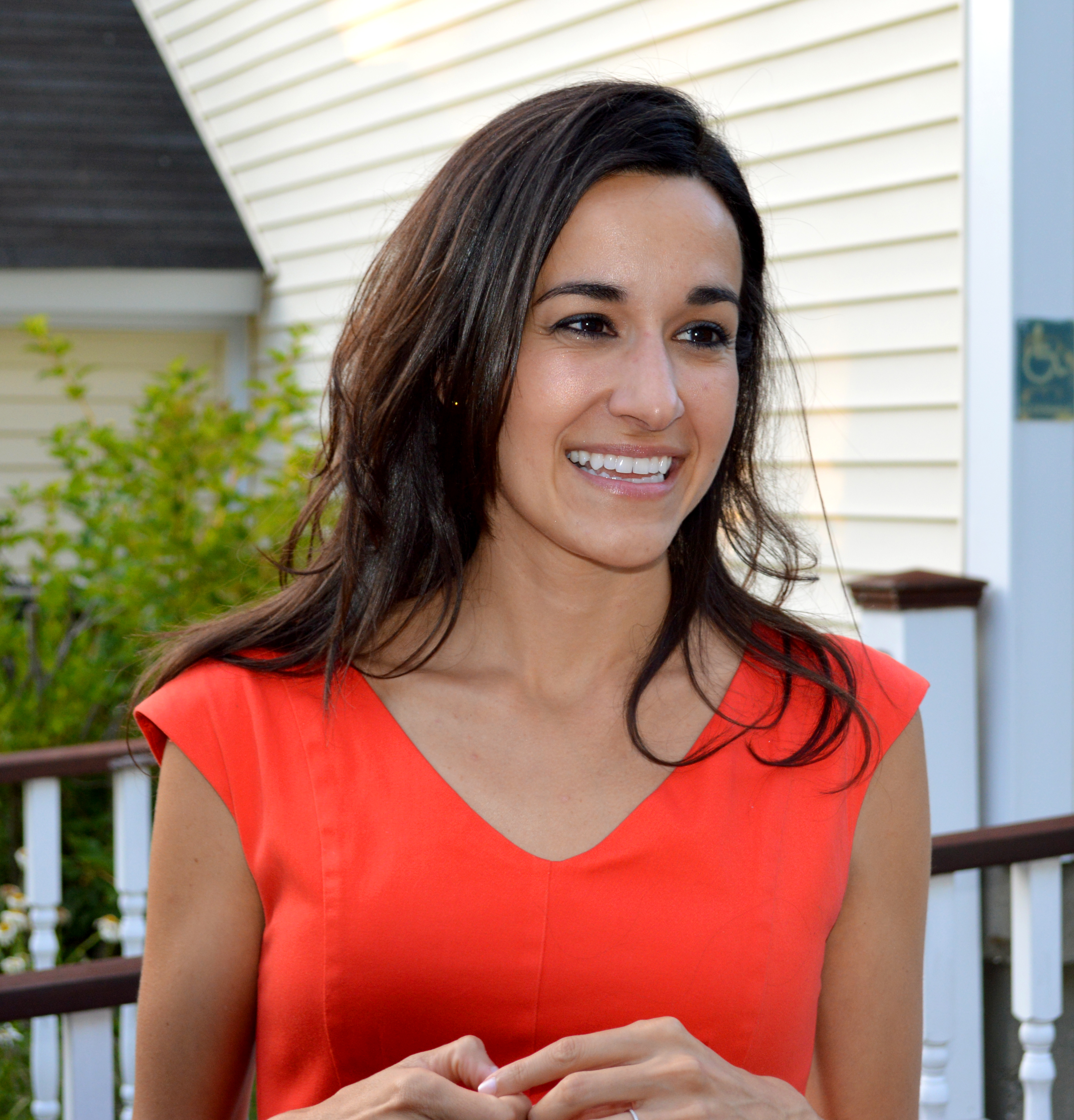

Member of the New Hampshire House of Representatives
- In office April 29, 2009 – December 2, 2014
- Constituency: 4th Rockingham (2009–2012); 8th Rockingham (2012–2014)
- In office January 3, 2007 – January 3, 2009
- Constituency: 4th Rockingham district

Personal details
- Born: c. 1983 (age 42–43) Boston, Massachusetts
- Party: Republican
- Education: Tufts University (BA); New England Conservatory of Music (BM); Harvard University (MPP)
- Occupation: Musician, Professor
- Website: marilindagarcia.com

Marilinda Joy Garcia (born c. 1983) is an American lobbyist and politician from the state of New Hampshire. A Republican, she served in the New Hampshire House of Representatives, representing the Rockingham 8th district from 2012 to 2014. She previously represented the Rockingham 4th district from 2007 to 2009 and from 2009 to 2012. A harpist, Garcia is also a music teacher.

Garcia was the Republican nominee for New Hampshire's 2nd congressional district in the 2014 elections on September 9, 2014. Garnering 45% of the vote, she lost the general election on November 4, 2014, to Ann McLane Kuster.

== Early life and career ==
While Garcia attended high school, she was a member of the Greater Boston Youth Symphony Repertory Orchestra and the Greater Boston Youth Symphony Senior Orchestra, as the Principal Harp. She attended Tufts University and the New England Conservatory of Music (NEC), earning joint bachelor's degrees in 2006.

After graduating from Tufts and NEC, served as a court-appointed special advocate for abused and neglected children. She also began teaching the harp at Gordon College, Phillips Exeter Academy, and St. Paul's School as an adjunct professor in music. She also attended Harvard University's John F. Kennedy School of Government, where she obtained her Master's degree in Public Policy in 2010.

== Political career ==
Garcia was elected to the New Hampshire House in 2006, at the age of 23. She became the co-chairman of the House Republican caucus and Majority Whip. She lost her bid for re-election in 2008. Her Rockingham District 4 elected thirteen candidates to the House and Garcia finished fourteenth.

She returned to the House in 2009 in a special election for Rockingham District 4, winning the Republican primary with 66% of the vote and the general election with 62% of the vote. She was re-elected in 2010, coming fourth out of the thirteen candidates who advanced to the general election, where she came seventh. The new Speaker Bill O' Brien appointed her vice chair of the House Legislative Administration committee which considers all matters pertaining to the legislative process including such issues such as mileage, elections, the journal, house resolutions and screening; enrolling bills; creation of statutory and chapter study committees. In 2012, she was re-elected from Rockingham District 8. In the Republican primary to determine the nine candidates for the seat, she came fifth. In the general election, she came seventh.

During her tenure in the New Hampshire House of Representatives, Garcia was the prime sponsor of the New Hampshire Innovation Job Growth Program bill, which enables the New Hampshire Business Finance Authority to facilitate the acquisition of early stage seed capital for NH entrepreneurs. In the 2012 session she was the prime sponsor of Destination Specialty Treatment Center bill that would reform the current antiquated regulatory environment of hospital construction and equipment purchasing and enable the development of NH's specialty health care sector. Most recently, she was the prime sponsor of a bill to restructure upper management of the New Hampshire Liquor Commission, and the Price Transparency Act relative to medical care pricing transparency for self-pay patients and the uninsured.

The Republican National Committee named her a "rising star" in 2013.

On October 23, 2014, the progressive advocacy group Granite State Progress accused Garcia of having plagiarized parts of a March 21, 2012, state house speech in opposition to same-sex marriage, and published an article documenting similarities between that speech and an editorial published in National Review on September 7, 2010. In a statement released on October 23, 2014, Garcia acknowledged that she failed to attribute excerpts from the article: "It appears I did not verbally attribute select excerpts of a speech I delivered on the House floor in 2012 to the article from which they came. I acknowledge that I should have verbally cited the author of the article and apologize for the oversight."

On November 25, 2013, Garcia announced that she was running for the United States House of Representatives in New Hampshire's 2nd congressional district in the 2014 elections. She defeated Gary Lambert and Jim Lawrence in the Republican primary with 49% of the votes and unsuccessfully challenged incumbent Democrat Ann McLane Kuster in the general election, taking 45% of the votes. After leaving office, she became a lobbyist for The LIBRE Initiative.

== Political positions ==
=== Healthcare ===
Garcia supports dismantling Obamacare. During an interview with New Hampshire Public Radio, Garcia declined to answer the question of whether she received health care insurance coverage under the Affordable Care Act. Garcia later stated that she is covered by health insurance outside of the Affordable Care Act network.

=== Immigration ===
During her 2014 campaign, Garcia criticized President Barack Obama's Deferred Action for Childhood Arrivals policy. On an influx of Central American unaccompanied minors fleeing to the United States, Garcia wrote "I believe the necessary action is to send these children back to their families and homes." Garcia also pledged, if elected, "to guarantee there is no amnesty for illegal immigrants."

=== Foreign policy ===
During her 2014 campaign, Garcia criticized the Obama administration's foreign policies.

=== Social issues ===
Garcia opposes abortion, but during her 2014 campaign did not emphasize the issue; a campaign spokesperson said that Garcia "is not focused on abortion" and that it "an issue that has been resolved by our courts." Garcia received the endorsement of the Susan B. Anthony List, an anti-abortion group, during the campaign.

In 2010, Garcia voted in favor of New Hampshire House Bill 1590, an effort to repeal same-sex marriage. Specifically, she voted against a motion to adopt the committee finding of "Inexpedient to Legislate" (which would defeat the bill). On March 21, 2012, Garcia spoke on the floor of the New Hampshire state house in favor of House Bill 437, which would have prohibited same-sex marriages and voted in favor of the bill.

== Personal life ==
Garcia is the daughter of an Italian immigrant mother and a Mexican-American father who was born in Nebraska and raised in New Mexico.

Garcia lives in Salem, New Hampshire. Garcia plays the harp in "The Seraphim Duo" with her sister, Bianca, also a former New Hampshire Representative, who plays the flute.
