= Richard Ashooh =

American businessman, politician, and government official (born 1964)

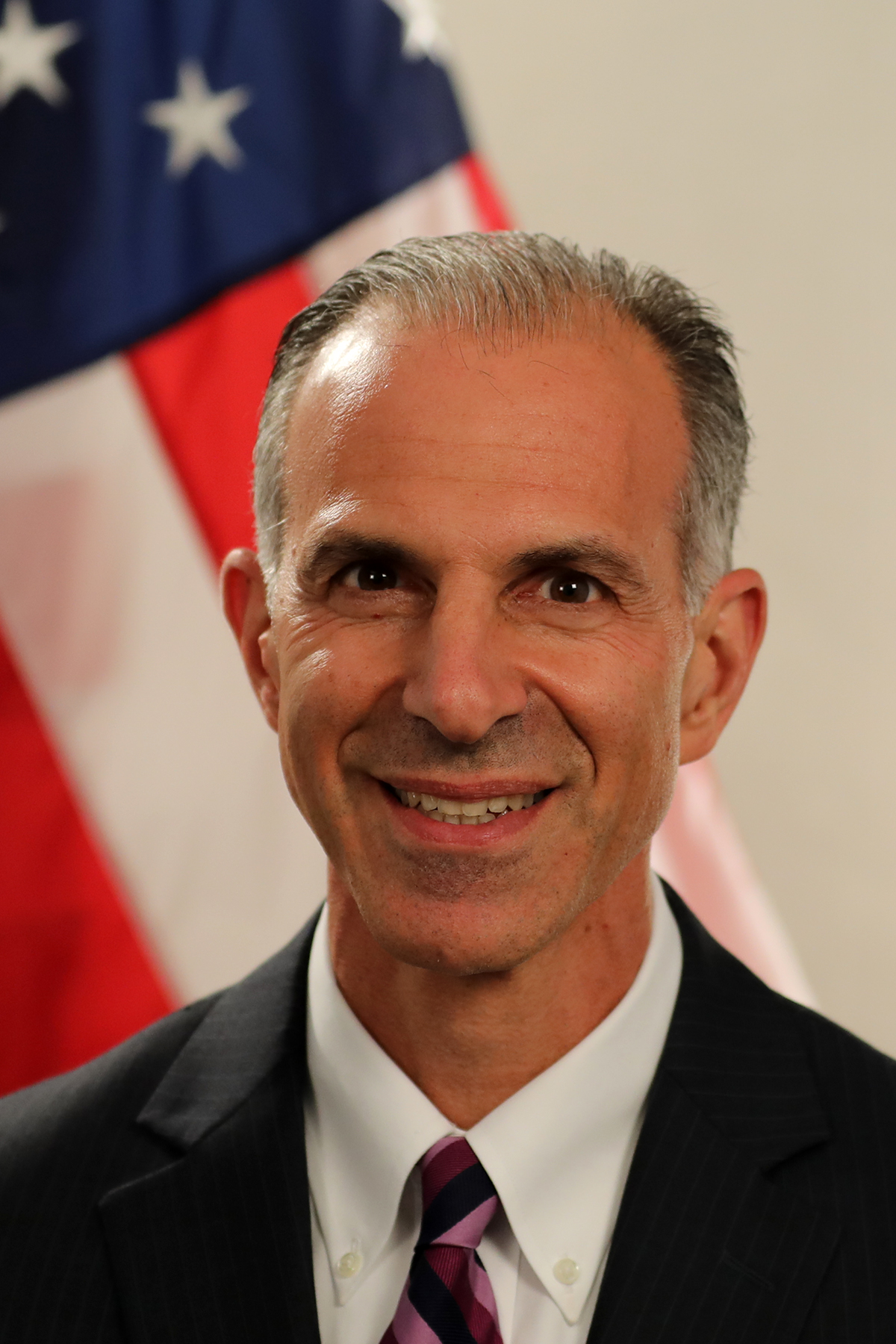

Assistant Secretary of Commerce for Export Administration
- In office September 11, 2017 – July 16, 2020
- President: Donald Trump
- Preceded by: Kevin J. Wolf
- Succeeded by: Thea Kendler

Personal details
- Born: June 2, 1964 (age 60)
- Political party: Republican
- Spouse: Lori
- Children: 5
- Education: University of New Hampshire

Richard Ashooh is an American businessman, politician, and government official who served as Assistant Secretary of Commerce for Export Administration from 2017 to 2020. Prior to assuming this role, he served as the Director of Economic Partnerships at the University System of New Hampshire. Ashooh previously served as the executive director of the Warren Rudman Center at the University of New Hampshire School of Law and was a senior executive in the aerospace industry, working for both Lockheed Martin and BAE Systems. During his time in the aerospace industry, Ashooh focused on programs that protect the United States and allied warfighters, particularly in the electronic warfare space.

Ashooh began his career as a staff member for the United States Senate Committee on Governmental Affairs, where he was active in the area of federal procurement policies. In both 2010 and 2016, he ran unsuccessfully in the Republican primary for New Hampshire's 1st congressional district. Ashooh has served on the board of trustees at the University System of New Hampshire and as chairman of the board at the Josiah Bartlett Center for Public Policy.

Ashooh resigned from his Commerce Department position on 16 July 2020. Following his resignation, Ashooh became the vice president of global government affairs for Lam Research.
