= WMUR-TV =

Television station in Manchester, New Hampshire

- Manchester, New Hampshire; United States
- Channels: Digital: 9 (VHF); Virtual: 9
- Branding: WMUR ABC 9; WMUR News 9

Programming
- Affiliations: 9.1: ABC; for others, see § Subchannels

Ownership
- Owner: Hearst Television; (Hearst Properties Inc.)
- Sister stations: WCVB-TV

History
- First air date: March 28, 1954
- Former channel numbers: Analog: 9 (VHF, 1954–2009); Digital: 59 (UHF, 1998–2009); Translators: W27BL 27 Berlin; WMUR-LP 29 Littleton; W38CB 38 Littleton
- Former affiliations: Fox (1994–2001, secondary on main channel, primary on two repeaters)
- Call sign meaning: Governor Francis P. Murphy (founder)

Technical information
- Licensing authority: FCC
- Facility ID: 73292
- ERP: 7.35 kW; 51 kW (application)
- HAAT: 312.4 m (1,025 ft)
- Transmitter coordinates: 42°59′1.3″N 71°35′23.2″W

Links
- Public license information: Public file; LMS
- Website: www.wmur.com

WMUR-TV (channel 9) is a television station licensed to Manchester, New Hampshire, United States, serving as the ABC affiliate to most of New Hampshire. Owned by Hearst Television, the station maintains studios on South Commercial Street in downtown Manchester, and its transmitter is located on the south peak of Mount Uncanoonuc in Goffstown.

Manchester is part of the larger Boston television market, making WMUR-TV part of a nominal duopoly with that city's ABC affiliate, WCVB-TV (channel 5); however, the two stations maintain separate operations. As a result, WMUR is the only New Hampshire–based television station with a news operation. In addition to WCVB-TV, WMUR-TV shares common coverage areas with four sister stations: the Portland, Maine, duopoly of ABC affiliate WMTW and CW affiliate WPXT; and the Burlington, Vermont, duopoly of CW affiliate WNNE in Montpelier and Plattsburgh, New York–based NBC affiliate WPTZ.

== History ==
=== Early years ===
The station signed on the air on March 28, 1954, as the first television station in New Hampshire. It was founded by former governor Francis P. Murphy, owner of WMUR radio (610 AM; now WGIR) through a company known as the Radio Voice of New Hampshire, Inc. Murphy beat out several challengers, including William Loeb III, publisher of the Manchester Union-Leader. It broadcast from a Victorian-style house on Elm Street in Manchester, alongside its sister radio station. In addition to carrying ABC programming (the station having been affiliated with the network since its sign-on), WMUR aired daily newscasts, local game shows and movies. The station's name, WMUR, is in reference to the first three letters of Murphy's last name.

In 1955, channel 9 boosted its signal significantly, providing a strong signal extending into portions of the Boston area. Murphy was well aware of this and began airing programming that had previously not been available in Boston. The following year, however, Murphy decided to retire. While a buyer was found immediately for WMUR radio, there were few takers for channel 9. Finally, in early 1957, he agreed in principle to sell WMUR-TV to Storer Broadcasting. However, Storer came under fire when it announced plans to move the station's transmitter to just outside Haverhill, Massachusetts—only 20 miles (32 km) north of Boston. It soon became apparent that Storer intended to move all of channel 9's operations across the border to Massachusetts and reorient it as the Boston market's third VHF station. The outcry led regulators to reject Storer's request to build a new tower near Haverhill. Storer then backed out of the deal, and the station remained in Murphy's hands until his death in December 1958. His estate finally sold the station a few months later to Richard Eaton's United Broadcasting. Storer eventually fulfilled their Boston ambitions in 1966 with the purchase of the channel 38 license as WSBK-TV.

=== Cutting costs ===
Soon after taking over, United laid off all but nine of WMUR's employees and reduced local programming to its two daily newscasts; most of the schedule consisted of ABC network programming. United ran channel 9 on a shoestring budget, broadcasting exclusively in black-and-white and devoting most of its efforts to managing Manchester's cable franchise. United paid almost no attention to the local station even as equipment broke down. The studio's upkeep also suffered; the floor was so slanted that cameras rolled on their own.

United also saved money by limiting the station's hours of operation. Channel 9 did not sign on until 10:00 a.m. on weekday mornings (with Popeye the Sailor cartoons followed by "Western Theater", a package of Roy Rogers and Gene Autry features). The western films began airing Monday through Friday in 1960 and were repeated every five months for the next 18 years.

WMUR continued to broadcast in black-and-white until 1973, long after the Boston stations had all upgraded to color capability. Two of the few things the station had going for it during this period were The Uncle Gus Show, hosted by station weatherman Gus Bernier for more than 20 years, and an increasingly active news department led by Tom Bonnar and Fred Kocher.

Throughout the 1970s, Richard Eaton's entire chain of radio and television stations, including WMUR, were under constant scrutiny by the Federal Communications Commission (FCC). In the cases involving two other television stations (WOOK-TV in Washington, D.C., and WMET-TV in Baltimore), as well as two other radio stations (WOOK (AM) in Washington and WFAB in Miami), their licenses were revoked entirely, each for different reasons. (An administrative law judge recommended the licenses of two other radio stations, WJMO (1490 AM) and WCUY (92.3 FM) in Cleveland Heights, Ohio, be revoked as well, but this was not acted upon by the commission due to Eaton's death in June 1981.) WMUR, KECC-TV in El Centro, California, and WMET-TV were investigated over allegations of bribery by Eaton of ABC-TV employees so WMUR and KECC would get more favorable terms in their ABC affiliations contracts.

The station continued to be run very cheaply into the early 1980s, but a change in ownership marked the beginning of a new era for WMUR.

=== 1980s and 1990s ===
In July 1981, following Richard Eaton's death, WMUR was sold to Columbus, Mississippi, businessman Birney Imes Jr. and his company, Imes Communications, which also owned that city's WCBI-TV, as well as WBOY-TV in Clarksburg, West Virginia. Years later several veterans, including newsman Tom Bonnar, said they only stayed at the station in hopes that a wealthier owner would see its potential. Imes made WMUR a significant influence in New Hampshire by giving it a badly needed technical overhaul, as well as upgrading its news department. In September 1987, the station moved from its original Elm Street studios to facilities in the historic Millyard area of the city.

In 1994, WMUR became both a primary and secondary affiliate of Fox. They also launched three low-powered repeaters in the northern portion of New Hampshire, one of them (W38CB in Littleton) carried WMUR's full ABC schedule, while the other two (W27BL in Berlin and W16BC, later WMUR-LP, in Littleton) were full-time primary affiliates of Fox. All of them, including its main channel, carried WMUR's newscasts as well as Fox Sports telecasts. While WMUR and W38CB continued to carry the full ABC schedule, W27BL and W16BC offered a different lineup that, while including WMUR's newscasts and some of its syndicated fare, replaced ABC programs with additional syndicated programming, as well as Fox's children's block and prime time lineup. W16BC was the only Fox affiliate to serve a portion of the Burlington–Plattsburgh media market until WFFF-TV began broadcasting on August 31, 1997. On December 19, 2001, WMUR dropped all Fox programming after the Hearst acquisition (Hearst has never affiliated any of their stations with Fox, a rarity in American broadcasting); in early 2002, W27BL and WMUR-LP began to carry WMUR-TV's full schedule, including ABC programming.

In 1995, WMUR purchased land and a building at its current location. This building was rebuilt as an 80,000-square-foot (7,400 m^{2}) state-of-the-art broadcast center; it moved to this new location in January 1996.

WMUR was the first television station in the country to develop a significant Internet presence beginning on October 8, 1995. It was the first television station to hire a full-time employee dedicated to streaming its newscast live and archived online for later viewing. It was also the first television station to use the Internet to supplement its broadcast news by posting additional information online like the Megan's Law list. After posting a 3D virtual tour of its TV studio facilities online, it briefly became the most visited attraction online in the world. Beginning in 1998, the station made significant financial, technical and staff investments into its Internet strategy. This included 24-hour original news segments, weather coverage by a professional meteorologist and sales executive dedicated to TV and online advertising. In 2000, WMUR, CNN and WMUR.com simulcast the New Hampshire presidential primary debates held at the TV station. This was the first widely promoted and executed worldwide live streaming video event.

=== Since 2000 ===
Versions of this logo were used from 2002 through June 2014; it is a modified version of a logo used starting in 1994.

In September 2000, Imes Communications reached an agreement to sell the station to Emmis Communications, who then traded WMUR to Hearst-Argyle Television, now Hearst Television, in exchange for that company's three radio stations in Phoenix, Arizona—KTAR, KMVP, and KKLT. In 2004, WMUR-TV celebrated fifty years of broadcasting.

On September 24, 2005, WMUR became available on satellite via DirecTV in Coös, Carroll, Grafton, and Sullivan counties in northern and west-central New Hampshire. Coös and Carroll counties are part of the Portland, Maine, market and thus had WMTW as their ABC affiliate, while Grafton and Sullivan counties are part of the Burlington–Plattsburgh market and hence received ABC programming from WVNY; these areas had no source of in-state news until WMUR's uplinking.

The station was featured in a fictional manner in the sixth season of The West Wing. Congressman Matt Santos, running in the Democratic Presidential primary, went to the WMUR studios to run a live ad for his campaign.

WMUR-TV began broadcasting on UHF channel 59 in November 1998. The station shut down its analog signal, over VHF channel 9, on June 12, 2009, the official date on which full-power television stations in the United States transitioned from analog to digital broadcasts under federal mandate. The station's digital signal relocated from its pre-transition UHF channel 59, which was among the high band UHF channels (52-69) that were removed from broadcasting use as a result of the transition to its analog era VHF channel 9.

In February 2010, WMUR introduced a new slogan, "It's how you know." This slogan often promoted its local news, weather, its photo-sharing site, "uLocal", and other ideas of interest that would lead to its website. WMUR's Hearst-owned sister stations KCRA and KSBW also used this slogan, which was seen at the beginning of each video segment on YouTube.

In July 2012, during a retransmission consent dispute, Hallmark Movie Channel was a substitute for Hearst Television's ABC affiliates, WMUR-TV and WMTW on Time Warner Cable.

In December 2015, the Democratic National Committee announced that WMUR would not be included as a co-sponsor of the Democratic debate due to a labor dispute between that station and its unionized employees.

== New Hampshire network affiliates ==
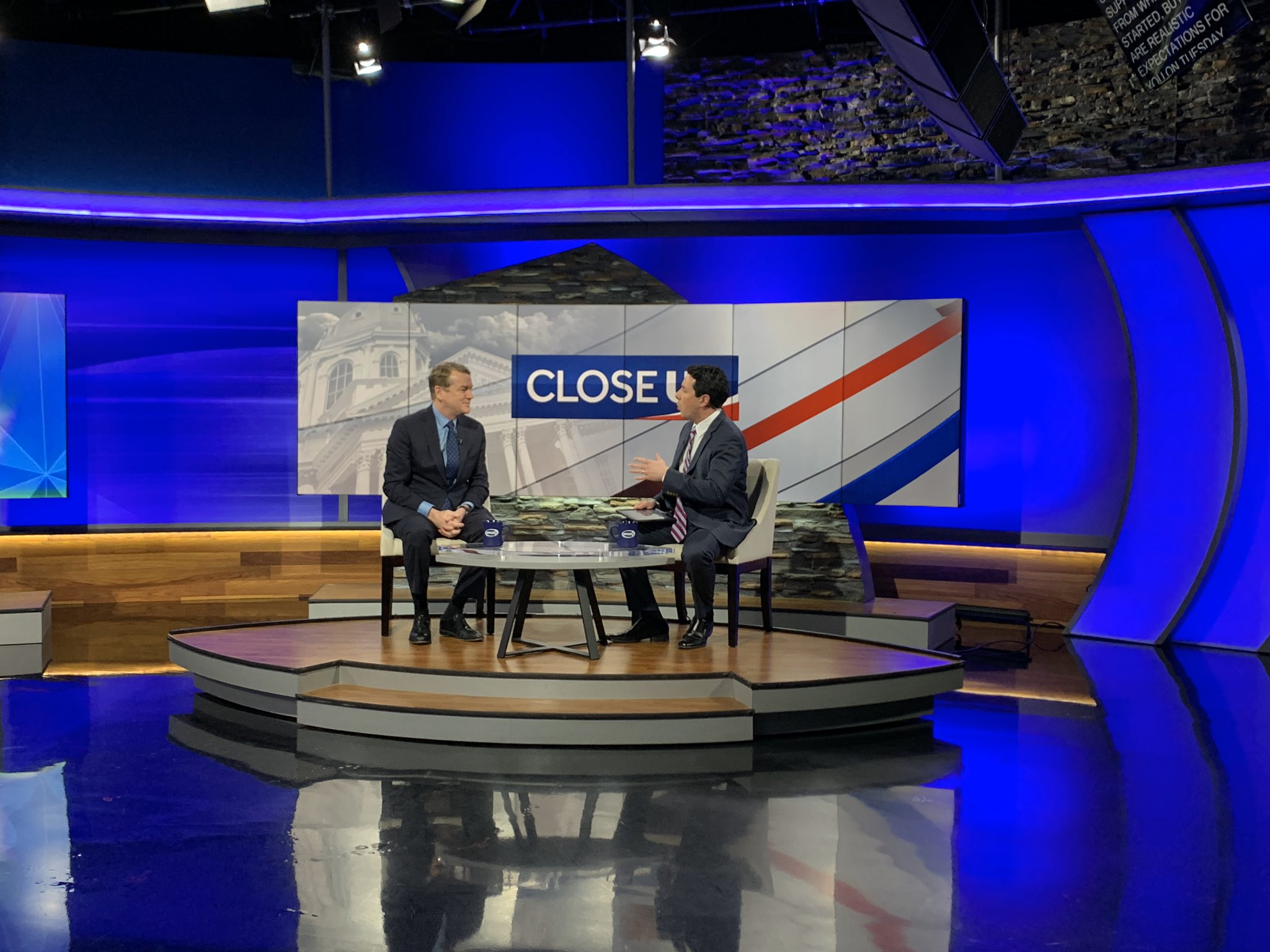
Adam Sexton (right) interviewing senator Michael Bennet during the 2020 presidential election

Manchester is about 45 miles (72 km) north from Boston while Concord is about 60 miles (97 km). Boston's VHF stations have Grade A signals in Manchester and Grade B signals in Concord, while the UHF stations have Grade B signals in Manchester but spotty signals in Concord. On paper, southern New Hampshire is large enough to be a market in its own right. If it were ever to break off from Boston, it would rank in the top 100 of all U.S. media markets. However, CBS's ownership of WBZ-TV (channel 4) makes this unlikely as it would result in the dilution of that station's advertising revenue, along with viewer upheaval at the loss of newscasts from the Boston area. This has been seen when Providence's stations in the southern portion of the Boston market attempted to claim market exclusivity resulting in some complaints from area cable customers. In the early 1990s, WBZ operated a news bureau in Manchester which was re-established on Elm Street in November 2006.

Prior to 1988, the sub-market was served by WMUR and PBS member station WENH-TV (which was part of the New Hampshire Public Television state network). On February 1, 1988, WNHT (channel 21, now occupied by WPXG-TV), an independent station based in Concord, became southern New Hampshire's first CBS affiliate and began to produce local newscasts. WNHT lost the affiliation and ceased operations on March 31, 1989, due to insufficient viewership. There has not been a CBS affiliate in the state since then. The situation with WMUR and sister station WCVB-TV is not unlike that of WHAG-TV in Hagerstown, Maryland, which operated as an NBC affiliate until 2016 even though it is part of the Washington, D.C., market and competed with that city's NBC owned-and-operated station, WRC-TV.

The only NBC affiliate to be based in the state was WRLH (channel 31) out of Lebanon, which operated from 1966 to 1968 and 1971 to 1974. Channel 31 returned to the air under a new license in 1978 as WNNE, now based in White River Junction, Vermont. WNNE broadcast NBC programming into parts of western New Hampshire from then until 2018, when it moved to Montpelier, Vermont, and became the CW affiliate for the Burlington–Plattsburgh market. Much of this area is considered part of the Burlington–Plattsburgh market, although WMUR is still available. The rest of the state receives NBC from that network's affiliates in either Boston or Portland. On January 1, 2017, Merrimack-licensed Telemundo owned-and-operated station WNEU (channel 60) began simulcasting NBC programming via its new Boston O&O WBTS-LD (channel 8, now Telemundo O&O WYCN-LD in Providence) on its second digital subchannel; however, the new station, known on-air as NBC Boston, is focused on Boston and eastern Massachusetts rather than New Hampshire. NBC also operates WBTS-CD (channel 15), licensed to serve Nashua; however, under a channel sharing agreement, it broadcasts from Needham, Massachusetts, over the transmitter of Boston-based WGBX-TV (channel 44). There were no UPN or WB affiliates in the state during the existence of those networks; likewise, The CW and MyNetworkTV do not have any affiliates in New Hampshire, and the state receives Fox from the network's affiliates in Boston, Massachusetts, Portland, Maine, or Burlington, Vermont.

WMUR has always promoted the fact that it is the only local television news source in the state; the station's slogan since 2002—"No One Covers New Hampshire Like We Do"—reflects this. At various points, channel 50 (as WNDS, WZMY-TV, and WBIN-TV) and WGOT (channel 60, now WNEU), as well as the aforementioned WNHT, have offered New Hampshire-focused local newscasts in competition with WMUR; the most recent of these operations, on WBIN-TV, was canceled in 2017 after that station sold its spectrum in an FCC auction, leaving WMUR once again as the only television news source in New Hampshire.

== Local programming ==
WMUR was one of the longest-serving affiliates of the Muscular Dystrophy Association's "Love Network", having carried The Jerry Lewis MDA Labor Day Telethon and its successors annually on Labor Day and/or the night before since the late 1960s. MDA moved the telethon from syndication to ABC in 2013 as the MDA Show of Strength; as a result, WMUR continued to broadcast the program for two more years until the telethon ended in 2014.

During the 1960s and 1970s, one of the station's well-known local programs was a weekday children's hour, The Uncle Gus Show. Unlike Boston's astronaut Major Mudd or the widely franchised Bozo, host Gus Bernier wore no costume except an angler's hat. Bernier, who doubled as the station's weatherman, presided over a studio audience of children, and would invite them to play games. He often caught kids who cheated during "Simon Says": "Simon says pat your head... now rub your tummy... Out, out, out! Yes, you, you're out!" Between studio segments, Bernier would show filmed cartoons.

For many years, WMUR's nighttime sign-off was accompanied by "New Hampshire Naturally" by The Shaw Brothers. The music was synchronized to bucolic scenes of a fly fisherman casting his line into a mountain stream, a covered bridge, the Old Man of the Mountain, flowers, fall foliage and other images. This theme was replaced at some point by "The Star-Spangled Banner".

=== News operation ===
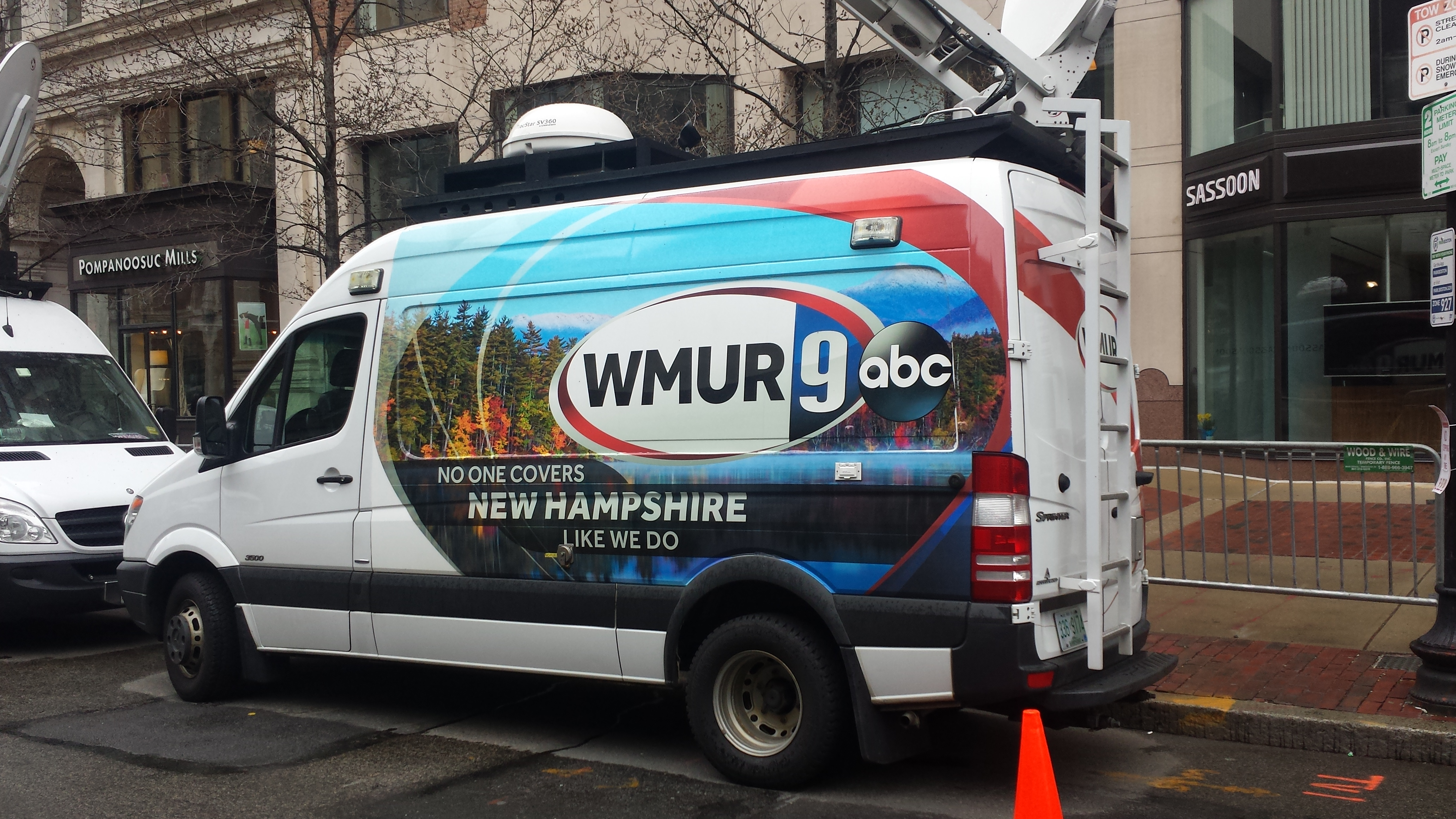
The mobile WMUR News vehicle at the 2015 Boston Marathon

WMUR-TV broadcasts 30 1/2 hours of locally produced newscasts each week (with 4 1/2 hours each weekday and four hours each on Saturdays and Sundays). In addition, WMUR produces New Hampshire Chronicle, a regional version of the Chronicle newsmagazine series that originated on Boston sister station WCVB-TV, which airs weeknights at 7 p.m.; and the political talk program Close Up, which airs on Sundays at 10 a.m.

During election seasons, WMUR is well known for organizing and producing candidate debates for ABC News, as well as CNN, before the first United States presidential primary; the debates have been held at Saint Anselm College. In addition to its main studios, WMUR operates two news bureaus in New Hampshire. The station's Lakes Region Bureau is based at The Inn at Bay Point in Meredith, and the Seacoast Bureau is based at Harbor Place in Portsmouth. In addition, WMUR and WCVB share news footage for stories occurring within the other station's coverage area; WCVB also operates a live truck for news gathering that is based at WMUR's studios in Manchester.

In lieu of its own weather radar, WMUR uses live radar data from several regional sites operated by the National Weather Service. During weather segments, the radar system used by WMUR that utilizes this data is presented on-screen as "Storm Watch 9 Storm Tracker", which is provided through a graphics system by Weather Services International. A live video feed of this radar is offered on WMUR's website. During instances of severe weather year-round, the station may extend local newscasts to provide coverage; this coverage is sometimes streamed live on the website.

On August 2, 2011, WMUR began broadcasting its local newscasts in high definition and introduced a new set and graphics package, which are styled differently from those of WCVB to avert any confusion between the two stations (along with its news music). WMUR began producing a half-hour weeknight 10 p.m. newscast for its MeTV subchannel on March 5, 2012, which competed with a 10 p.m. newscast on WBIN-TV until early 2017, when that station went off the air as a result of the FCC's spectrum auction. On November 5, 2018, WMUR introduced another new graphics package, this time for the full 16:9 widescreen presentation, but like the previous version, they are styled differently from those of WCVB to avert any confusion between the two stations (and their other sister stations that have a news operation).

==== Notable current on-air staff ====
- Erin Fehlau – anchor; also host of New Hampshire Chronicle

==== Notable former on-air staff ====
- Jack Edwards – sports anchor
- Chris Wragge – sports reporter

== Technical information ==
=== Subchannels ===
The station's signal is multiplexed:

Subchannels of WMUR-TV
Subchannel	Res.	Short name	Programming
9.1	1080i	WMUR	ABC
9.2	480i	WMUR Me	MeTV
9.5	480i	QVC	QVC (4:3)

On October 3, 2011, WMUR added subchannel 9.2 with programming from classic television network MeTV.

In October 2021, WMUR added subchannel 9.3 carrying Shop LC programming (and later QVC) on subchannel 9.5.

=== Former repeaters ===
From August 22, 1994, until January 18, 2022, WMUR operated repeaters in northern New Hampshire. Until December 19, 2001, two of the stations were primarily affiliated with Fox but simulcast channel 9's newscasts and some syndicated programs (the third repeater carried all WMUR programming, including ABC network programs). The two Fox stations started simulcasting WMUR when WMTW (at that time separately owned) relocated its transmitter away from Mount Washington.

Call sign	Channel	City of license	Notes
W27BL	27	Berlin	Part of Portland market; First on-air on August 22, 1994
WMUR-LP	29	Littleton	Part of Burlington–Plattsburgh market; Tower formerly shared with W38CB on Cannon Mountain; Formerly W16BC and (briefly) W29CM; First on-air on June 5, 1995

A third translator, W38CB, was also licensed to Littleton, sharing the Cannon Mountain transmitter site with WMUR-LP. It launched in May 1995 and, unlike the other Littleton facility, always aired ABC programming.

Since all three stations were low-powered, they were exempt from the transition to digital-only broadcasting on June 12, 2009. W38CB was removed from service on December 27, 2018, to enable T-Mobile to launch 600 MHz services; the license was surrendered for cancellation on February 10, 2020. W27BL and WMUR-LP turned off their analog signals on July 13, 2021. They had pending construction permits to convert to digital, until the FCC canceled those two licenses on January 18, 2022.

== See also ==
- Channel 9 virtual TV stations in the United States
- Channel 9 digital TV stations in the United States
- List of television stations in New Hampshire
