= 2018 New Hampshire gubernatorial election =

- November 6, 2018
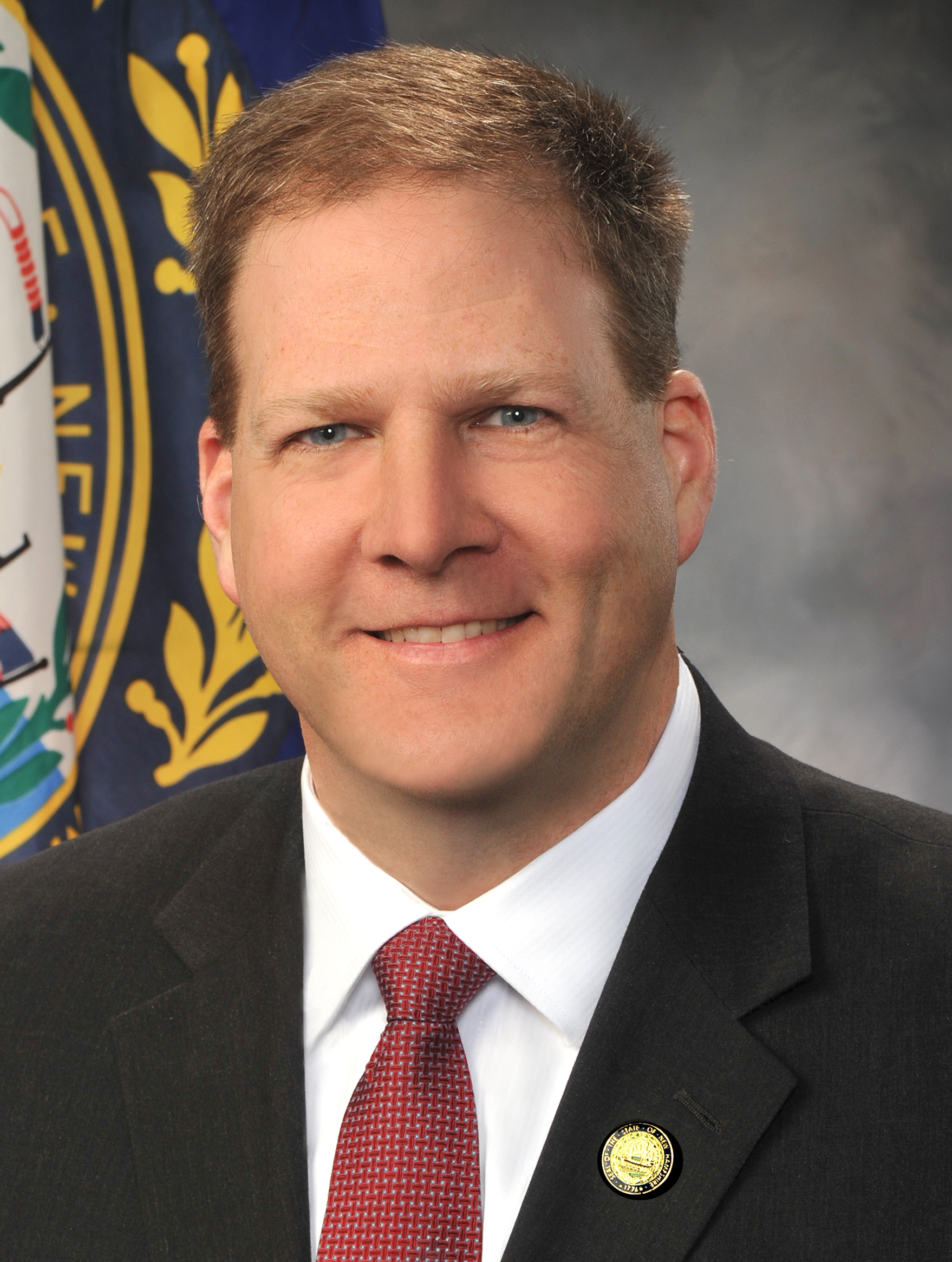

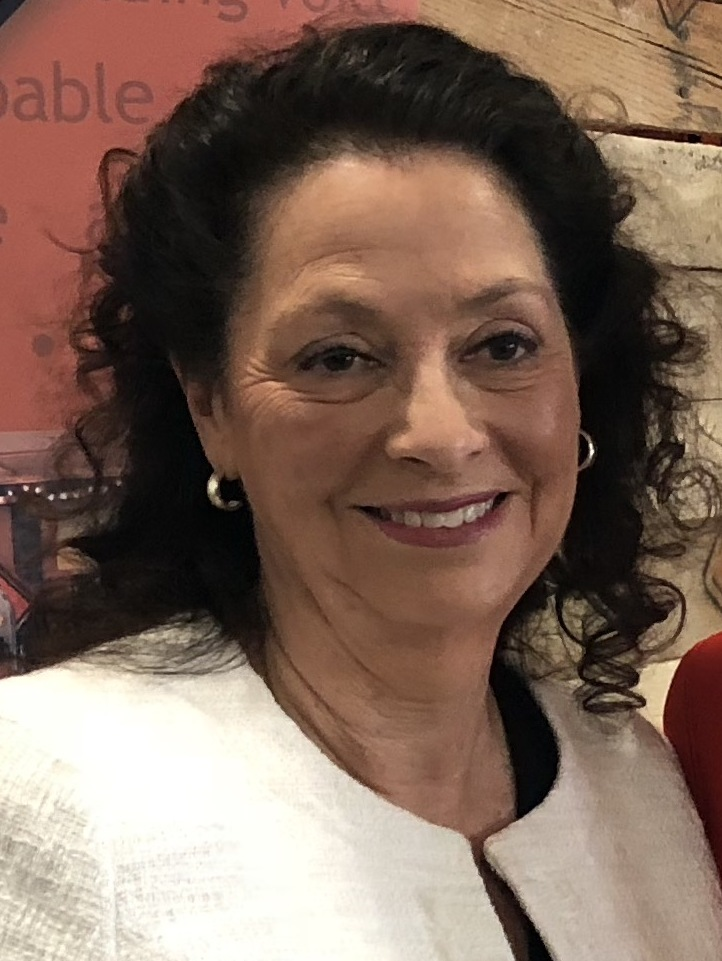
Nominee	Chris Sununu	Molly Kelly
Party	Republican	Democratic
Popular vote	302,764	262,359
Percentage	52.78%	45.74%
- Sununu: 40–50% 50–60% 60–70% 70–80% 80–90% >90% Kelly: 40–50% 50–60% 60–70% 70–80% 80–90% >90% Tie: 40–50% No votes
Governor before election
Chris Sununu
Republican
Elected Governor
Chris Sununu
Republican

The 2018 New Hampshire gubernatorial election took place on November 6, 2018, to elect the governor of New Hampshire. Incumbent Republican governor Chris Sununu won re-election to a second term, defeating former state senator Molly Kelly. Sununu was the first incumbent Republican to win reelection as governor since Steve Merrill was reelected in 1994.

Primary elections were held on September 11, 2018. The gubernatorial election was coincident with races for the state legislature and the United States House of Representatives. This was one of eight Republican-held governorships up for election in a state won by Hillary Clinton in the 2016 presidential election.

== Background ==
New Hampshire is one of only two states, along with Vermont, where governors are elected to two-year terms. Republican Chris Sununu was elected in the 2016 election.

== Republican primary ==
=== Candidates ===
==== Declared ====
- Chris Sununu, incumbent governor

=== Polling ===
Poll source	Date(s) administered	Sample size	Margin of error	Chris Sununu	Other	Undecided
TargetPoint/GQR	March 8–15, 2018	326	± 5.4%	77%	9%	14%

=== Results ===
Results by county: Sununu—≥90%

Republican primary results
Party	Candidate	Votes	%
Republican	Chris Sununu (incumbent)	91,025	98.3
Democratic	Molly Kelly (write-in)	577	0.6
Democratic	Steve Marchand (write-in)	160	0.2
Libertarian	Jiletta Jarvis (write-in)	90	0.0
Libertarian	Aaron Day (write-in)	39	0.0
Scattering		692	0.7
Total votes		92,583	100.0

== Democratic primary ==
=== Candidates ===
==== Declared ====
- Molly Kelly, former state senator
- Steve Marchand, former mayor of Portsmouth and candidate for governor in 2016

==== Declined ====
- Dan Feltes, state senator
- Chris Pappas, Executive Councilor (running for NH-01)
- Colin Van Ostern, former executive councilor and nominee for governor in 2016 (running for Secretary of State)
- Andru Volinsky, Executive Councilor

=== Polling ===
Poll source	Date(s) administered	Sample size	Margin of error	Mark Connolly	Molly Kelly	Steve Marchand	Other	Undecided
Suffolk University	April 26–30, 2018	401	–	–	21%	19%	–	58%
TargetPoint/GQR	March 8–15, 2018	346	± 5.3%	9%	17%	11%	4%	58%

=== Results ===
Results by county: Kelly—70–80% Kelly—60–70%

Democratic primary results
Party	Candidate	Votes	%
Democratic	Molly Kelly	80,598	65.5
Democratic	Steve Marchand	41,612	33.8
Republican	Chris Sununu (write-in) (incumbent)	563	0.5
Libertarian	Jiletta Jarvis (write-in)	17	0.0
Libertarian	Aaron Day (write-in)	8	0.0
Scattering		167	0.1
Total votes		122,965	100.0

== Libertarian primary ==
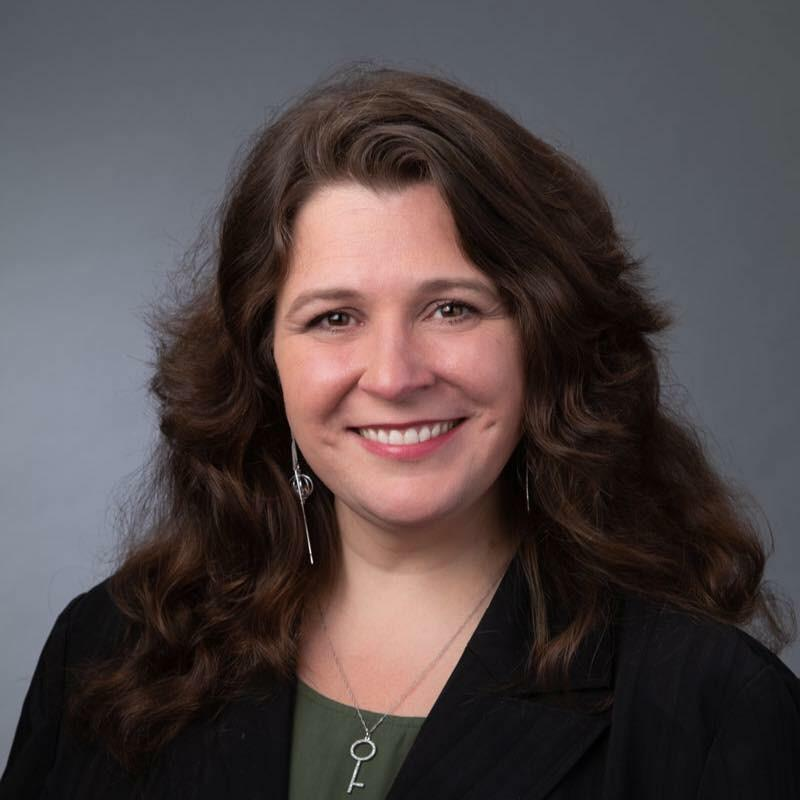
Jilletta Jarvis was the Libertarian candidate in the election.

=== Candidates ===
==== Declared ====
- Aaron Day, former chair of the Free State Project and independent candidate for the U.S. Senate in 2016
- Jilletta Jarvis, former secretary of the Libertarian Party of New Hampshire and independent candidate for governor in 2016

=== Results ===
Results by county: Jarvis—60–70% Jarvis—50–60% Jarvis—40–50% Day—40–50% Day—50–60%

Libertarian Primary results
Party	Candidate	Votes	%
Libertarian	Jilletta Jarvis	576	51.9
Libertarian	Aaron Day	487	43.9
Republican	Chris Sununu (write-in) (incumbent)	21	1.9
Democratic	Molly Kelly (write-in)	9	0.8
Democratic	Steve Marchand (write-in)	6	0.5
Scattering		11	1.0
Total votes		1,110	100.0

== General election ==
=== Predictions ===
Source	Ranking	As of
The Cook Political Report	Lean R	October 26, 2018
The Washington Post	Lean R	November 5, 2018
FiveThirtyEight	Likely R	November 5, 2018
Rothenberg Political Report	Lean R	November 1, 2018
Sabato's Crystal Ball	Lean R	November 5, 2018
RealClearPolitics	Tossup	November 4, 2018
Daily Kos	Likely R	November 5, 2018
Fox News (Note: The Fox News Midterm Power Rankings uniquely does not contain a category for Safe/Solid races)	Lean R	November 5, 2018
Politico	Lean R	November 5, 2018
Governing	Lean R	November 5, 2018

=== Endorsements ===
Molly Kelly (D)

Former U.S. Executive Branch officials

- Hillary Clinton, 67th United States Secretary of State
- Barack Obama, 44th President of the United States

U.S. senators

- Cory Booker, U.S. senator (D-NJ)
- Maggie Hassan, U.S. senator (D-NH) and former governor of New Hampshire
- Jeanne Shaheen, U.S. senator (D-NH) and former governor of New Hampshire
- Elizabeth Warren, U.S. senator (D-MA)

U.S. representatives

- Ann McLane Kuster, U.S. representative (D-NH-2)

Local and state politicians

- Peter Burling, former state senator
- Joyce Craig, Mayor of Manchester
- Lou D'Allesandro, state senator
- Betsi DeVries, former state senator
- Dan Feltes, state senator
- Joe Foster, former attorney general of New Hampshire
- Peggy Gilmour, former state senator
- Martha Hennessey, state senator
- Beverly Hollingworth, former Executive Councilor of New Hampshire and former state senator
- Jay Kahn, state senator
- Sylvia Larsen, former president of the New Hampshire Senate
- Mandy Merrill, former state senator
- Terie Norelli, former speaker of the New Hampshire House of Representatives
- Deborah Reynolds, former state senator
- Steve Shurtleff, New Hampshire House of Representatives Democratic Minority Leader
- Donna Soucy, State Senate Minority Leader
- Rick Trombly, executive director of NEA-New Hampshire and former state senator
- David Watters, state senator
- Katie Wheeler, former state senator
- Jeff Woodburn, New Hampshire Senate Minority Leader

Individuals

- Misha Collins, actor and former White House intern
- Kathy Sullivan, former chairperson of the New Hampshire Democratic Party

Labor unions

- American Federation of Teachers-New Hampshire
- International Brotherhood of Teamsters Local 633
- National Education Association – New Hampshire Affiliate
- New Hampshire AFL-CIO
- State Employees' Association of New Hampshire/Service Employees International Union Local 1984

Organizations

- EMILY's List
- End Citizens United
Chris Sununu (R)

Individuals

- Chris Christie, former governor of New Jersey
- Mike Pence, Vice President of the United States

Organizations

- International Brotherhood of Electrical Workers Local 104
- National Federation of Independent Business
- New Hampshire Police Association
- New Hampshire Troopers Association
- Professional Fire Fighters of New Hampshire

Newspapers

- The Exeter News-Letter
- Foster's Daily Democrat
- Hampton Union'
- Nashua Telegraph
- The Portsmouth Herald
- Union Leader

=== Polling ===
View source data.

Poll source	Date(s) administered	Sample size	Margin of error	Chris Sununu (R)	Molly Kelly (D)	Jilletta Jarvis (L)	Other	Undecided
University of New Hampshire	November 1–4, 2018	630	± 3.9%	46%	46%	2%	0%	6%
Change Research (D-NH Democratic Party)	October 27–29, 2018	901	–	47%	46%	–	–	–
Emerson College	October 27–29, 2018	1,139	± 3.7%	51%	43%	1%	–	5%
University of New Hampshire	October 10–18, 2018	499	± 4.4%	50%	39%	4%	–	7%
Saint Anselm College	October 10–15, 2018	454	± 4.6%	49%	39%	1%	0%	12%
Emerson College	October 10–12, 2018	625	± 4.2%	51%	35%	1%	–	14%
American Research Group	September 21–26, 2018	800	± 3.5%	49%	44%	–	0%	7%
University of New Hampshire	August 2–19, 2018	389	± 5.0%	48%	32%	–	5%	16%
Suffolk University	April 26–30, 2018	800	± 3.5%	48%	27%	4%	–	21%
University of New Hampshire	April 13–22, 2018	379	± 5.0%	51%	24%	2%	4%	20%

Hypothetical polling

with Steve Marchand

Poll source	Date(s) administered	Sample size	Margin of error	Chris Sununu (R)	Steve Marchand (D)	Jilletta Jarvis (L)	Other	Undecided
University of New Hampshire	August 2–19, 2018	389	± 5.0%	48%	33%	–	4%	15%
Suffolk University	April 26–30, 2018	800	± 3.5%	49%	25%	4%	–	21%
University of New Hampshire	April 13–22, 2018	379	± 5.0%	49%	24%	2%	2%	20%
University of New Hampshire	January 28 – February 10, 2018	381	± 5.0%	42%	28%	–	–	30%

with Chris Sununu and generic Democrat

Poll source	Date(s) administered	Sample size	Margin of error	Chris Sununu (R)	Generic Democrat	Undecided
Praecones Analytica	August 13–15, 2018	626	± 3.9%	47%	33%	20%

with generic Republican and Democrat

Poll source	Date(s) administered	Sample size	Margin of error	Generic Republican	Generic Democrat	Other	Undecided
TargetPoint/GQR	March 8–15, 2018	600	± 4.0%	43%	39%	4%	14%

with Mark Connolly

Poll source	Date(s) administered	Sample size	Margin of error	Chris Sununu (R)	Mark Connolly (D)	Other	Undecided
University of New Hampshire	January 28 – February 10, 2018	381	± 5.0%	41%	29%	–	30%

with Sununu and Van Ostern

Poll source	Date(s) administered	Sample size	Margin of error	Chris Sununu (R)	Colin Van Ostern (D)	Undecided
University of New Hampshire	January 28 – February 10, 2018	381	± 5.0%	41%	31%	28%

=== Results ===
2018 New Hampshire gubernatorial election
Party	Candidate	Votes	%	±%
Republican	Chris Sununu (incumbent)	302,764	52.78%	+3.94%
Democratic	Molly Kelly	262,359	45.74%	−0.83%
Libertarian	Jilletta Jarvis	8,197	1.43%	−2.88%
Write-in		282	0.05%	-0.23%
Total votes		573,602	100.00%	N/A
Republican hold				

==== By county ====
2018 Gubernatorial election results in New Hampshire (by county)
County	Molly Kelly Democratic		Chris Sununu Republican		Other votes		Margin		Total votes
	#	%	#	%	#	%	#	%	#
Belknap	9,690	36.00%	16,856	62.62%	374	1.39%	7,166	26.62%	26,920
Carroll	10,432	43.46%	13,308	55.44%	265	1.10%	2,876	11.98%	24,005
Cheshire	18,158	55.80%	13,875	42.64%	509	1.56%	-4,283	-13.16%	32,542
Coös	4,988	42.96%	6,397	55.10%	225	1.94%	1,409	12.14%	11,610
Grafton	22,932	56.89%	16,734	41.52%	642	1.59%	-6,198	-15.37%	40,308
Hillsborough	72,033	44.34%	87,846	54.07%	2,589	1.59%	15,813	9.73%	162,468
Merrimack	30,540	46.97%	33,513	51.54%	972	1.49%	2,973	4.57%	65,025
Rockingham	59,269	42.29%	79,195	56.50%	1,699	1.21%	19,926	14.21%	140,163
Strafford	26,593	49.89%	25,782	48.37%	931	1.75%	-811	-1.52%	53,306
Sullivan	7,724	44.76%	9,258	53.65%	273	1.58%	1,534	8.89%	17,255

Counties that flipped from Democratic to Republican

- Merrimack (largest city: Concord)

==== By congressional district ====
Sununu won both congressional districts, which simultaneously elected Democrats.

District	Sununu	Kelly	Representative
1st	55%	44%	Chris Pappas
2nd	51%	48%	Annie Kuster
