= Trombly =

Trombly is a surname. Notable people with the surname include:

- Janice Trombly (born 1957), American former handball player
- Preston Trombly (born 1945), American musician
- Rick Trombly (fl. 1978–2020), American politician

== See also ==
- Trombly, Michigan
