= Chris Sununu =

American politician (born 1974)

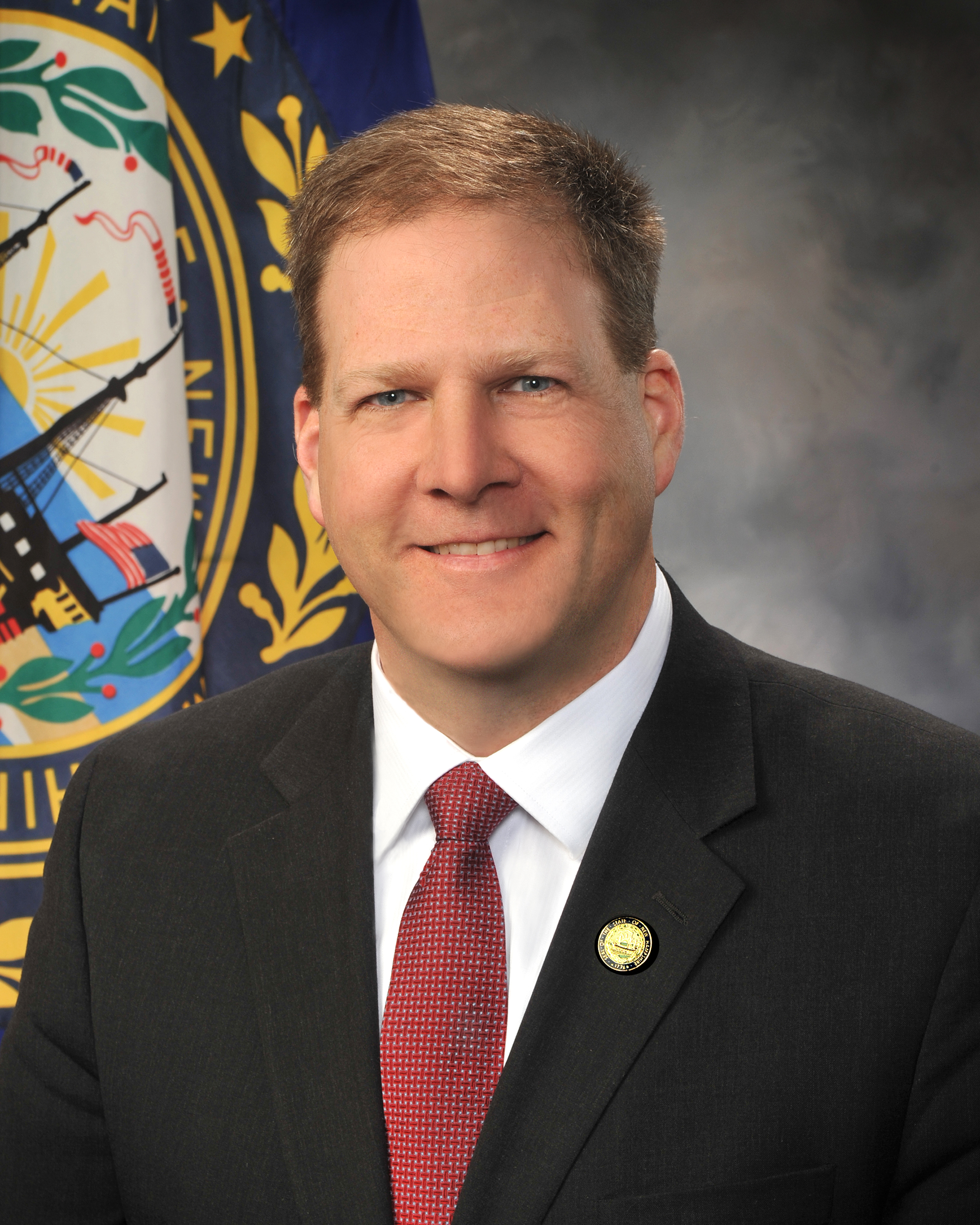
- Official portrait, 2017

82nd Governor of New Hampshire
- In office January 5, 2017 – January 9, 2025
- Preceded by: Chuck Morse (acting)
- Succeeded by: Kelly Ayotte

Member of the New Hampshire Executive Council from the 3rd district
- In office January 3, 2011 – January 3, 2017
- Preceded by: Beverly Hollingworth
- Succeeded by: Russell Prescott

Personal details
- Born: Christopher Thomas Sununu; November 5, 1974 (age 52) Salem, New Hampshire, U.S.
- Party: Republican
- Spouse: Valerie Sununu (m. 2001)
- Children: 3
- Parents: John H. Sununu; Nancy Hayes Sununu
- Relatives: John E. Sununu (brother)
- Education: Massachusetts Institute of Technology (BS)

Christopher Thomas Sununu (/səˈnuːnuː/ sə-NOO-noo; born November 5, 1974) is an American politician and engineer who served as the 82nd governor of New Hampshire from 2017 to 2025.

A Republican, Sununu is the son of former New Hampshire governor and White House Chief of Staff John H. Sununu and the younger brother of former U.S. representative and senator John E. Sununu. He earned a bachelor's degree in civil and environmental engineering from the Massachusetts Institute of Technology. Sununu was chief executive officer of the Waterville Valley Resort in New Hampshire, and he served on the New Hampshire Executive Council from 2011 to 2017.

Sununu was first elected governor of New Hampshire in 2016. He was reelected in 2018, 2020, and 2022. Sununu is the second governor in New Hampshire history (after John Lynch) to be elected to a fourth term. His tenure focused on fiscal conservatism, tax cuts, business-friendly policies, and efforts to combat the opioid crisis. A moderate Republican, Sununu took mixed stances on social issues, supporting some LGBTQ rights while restricting certain transgender rights. On July 19, 2023, he announced that he would not run for a fifth term. Sununu endorsed Kelly Ayotte, who won the election to succeed him.

== Early life and education ==
Sununu was born on November 5, 1974. His hometown is Salem, New Hampshire. Sununu is the son of former New Hampshire Governor John H. Sununu and Nancy Sununu, the former chair of the New Hampshire Republican State Committee and First Lady of New Hampshire. He is one of eight siblings. His older brother, John E. Sununu, is a former U.S. senator and U.S. representative.

Sununu's family originates from Lebanon, though his paternal grandfather, John, was born in the United States. His father, also named John, was born in Havana, Cuba. Sununu's father's paternal ancestors came to the United States from Lebanon. His paternal grandmother was an immigrant from El Salvador, born to a prominent Salvadoran family of Lebanese descent who were Greek Orthodox Christians. His father's paternal ancestry is Lebanese and Greek, both from the Greek Orthodox communities in Jerusalem. Despite the family's emigration from Jerusalem, some members of the family were from Beirut. His father's maternal ancestry was Greek and Hispanic. When he took office as governor, Sununu was sworn in with a Greek Orthodox New Testament Bible belonging to his family.

Sununu graduated from Thomas Jefferson High School for Science and Technology in Fairfax County, Virginia, in 1993. He graduated from the Massachusetts Institute of Technology (MIT) with a B.S. in civil and environmental engineering in 1998. After graduating from MIT, Sununu attended New York University Tisch School of the Arts as a film student for two months.

== Early career ==
Sununu worked as an environmental engineer designing systems and solutions for cleaning up waste sites under the supervision of licensed engineers. He specialized in soil and groundwater remediation, wastewater treatment plants, and landfill designs. In 2002, he became an "engineer in training" in California.

In 2010, Sununu led a group of investors in the buyout of Waterville Valley Resort. He worked as the resort's chief executive officer, employing over 700 people in the White Mountains region.

== New Hampshire Executive Council ==
Sununu was an elected member of the five-member Executive Council of New Hampshire from 2011 to 2017.

=== 10-Year Highway Plan ===
On December 16, 2015, the Governor's Advisory Commission on the Intermodal Transportation (GACIT) presented the 10-Year Plan for 2017–2026 to the governor of New Hampshire. As a voting member of GACIT, Sununu helped develop the blueprint, which "aggressively addressed financial constraint, assuming federal funding of about $160 million per year."

=== Ward Bird ===
In 2010, Sununu joined the other four Executive Council members in voting unanimously to release Ward Bird from his mandatory three- to six-year prison sentence for threatening another person with a gun. The council voted to grant Bird a full pardon. Bird was convicted of brandishing a gun at a woman who trespassed on his posted property in 2008. But Governor John Lynch, who had never granted a pardon during his tenure, vetoed the measure, saying the judicial system had given Bird's case a thorough review and he would not undermine it. The council then immediately voted to commute Bird's sentence, and Lynch let that vote stand.

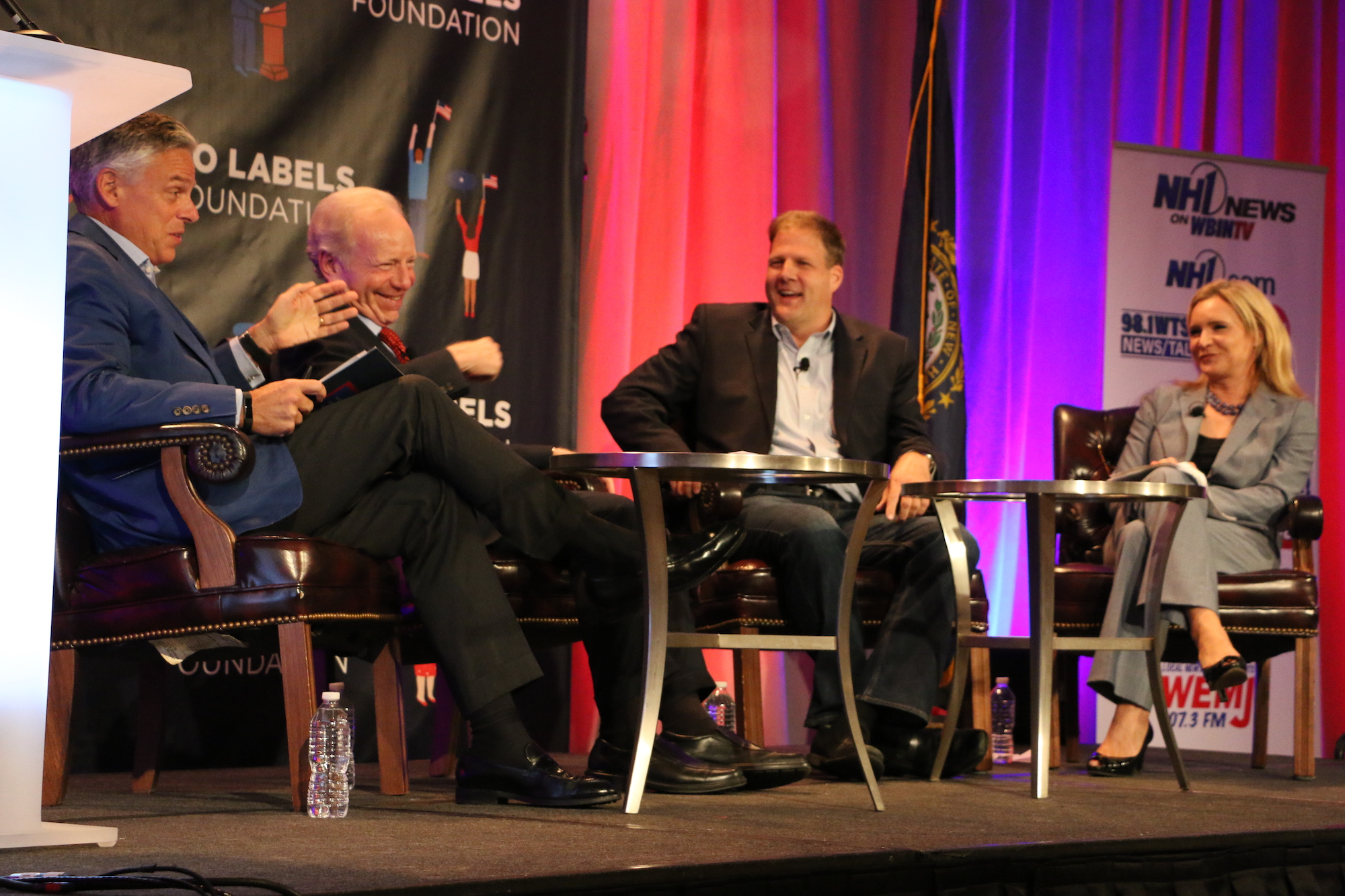
At 2016 gubernatorial candidate forum: moderators Jon Huntsman Jr. (former Utah Governor, left) and Joe Lieberman (former Connecticut Senator, center left), and Republican candidate Chris Sununu (center right)

=== Managed Medicaid ===
In 2014, a 300-page, $292 million amendment to the state's Medicaid program came before the Executive Council only two hours before the scheduled vote. Sununu and fellow Republican Joseph Kenney urged Governor Lynch and other Democrats present not to vote for the contract, but lost the vote 3–2, along party lines.

== Governor of New Hampshire ==
=== Elections ===
==== 2016 ====
In the general election, Sununu defeated Democratic nominee Colin Van Ostern, 48.8% to 46.6%.

==== 2018 ====
Sununu was reelected, defeating Democratic nominee Molly Kelly, 52.8% to 45.7%.

==== 2020 ====
On May 14, 2019, Sununu announced that he would seek a third term as governor, rather than challenging Senator Jeanne Shaheen in the 2020 election.

After securing the Republican nomination, Sununu received 516,609 votes (65.1%) against Democratic nominee Dan Feltes, the highest number ever received by a New Hampshire gubernatorial candidate. He outpaced President Donald Trump (365,654; 45.4%) by about 151,000 votes of approximately 793,000 cast, as Trump lost New Hampshire's electoral votes.

==== 2022 ====
On November 9, 2021, Sununu announced his intention to run for a fourth term as governor instead of challenging incumbent U.S. senator Maggie Hassan. He received 78.66% in the Republican primary, defeating Karen Testerman, Thaddeus Riley, and others. He won 57.0% of the vote in the general election, defeating Democrat Thomas Sherman and Libertarians Karlyn Borysenko and Kelly Halldorson. This became the fourth straight split-ticket election in the state when all members elected to Congress were members of the Democratic Party while the elected governor was a member of the Republican Party.

=== Tenure ===
Sununu was sworn in as governor on January 5, 2017. He was sworn in for his second term on January 3, 2019, and his third term on January 7, 2021.

In October 2018, Sununu introduced the state's new "hub and spoke model" for addiction recovery. The model includes nine regional hubs (in Berlin, Concord, Dover, Hanover, Keene, Laconia, Littleton, Manchester, and Nashua), which coordinate with local "spokes" to provide addiction recovery services. Hubs receive $9 million a year, stemming from $45.8 million in federal aid to combat the state's opioid epidemic. In March 2019, Sununu announced that an additional $12 million had been allocated to New Hampshire to fight the opioid epidemic.

On May 3, 2019, Sununu vetoed a bill to repeal capital punishment in New Hampshire. As drafted, the bill was not retroactive, and so did not apply to Michael K. Addison, convicted of the 2006 murder of Michael Briggs, an on-duty police officer. Sununu signed the veto at a community center named after Briggs. The veto was overridden.

During the COVID-19 pandemic, Sununu has criticized members of Congress and members of the Biden administration for the lack of relief packages. He has also criticized members of Congress for getting early access to COVID-19 vaccines. In November 2020, Sununu instituted a statewide mask mandate, which sparked protests outside his house. He opposed what he characterized as federal overreach on mandates, saying, "I am as pro-vaccine as it gets, but I do not support this mandate from Washington, as it is not the answer."

In 2023, Sununu issued an executive order forbidding the state from working with entities involved in anti-Israel boycotts.

On September 12, 2024, Sununu signed controversial voter ID legislation into law. The new law requires documentary proof of US citizenship to register to vote, and a photo ID to vote in person.

== Presidential aspirations ==
In January 2023, Sununu said he was considering a White House bid in 2024, but noted, "I really don't have a timeline." In March 2023, he predicted that Donald Trump was "not going to be the nominee; that's just not going to happen." In June 2023, he announced that he would not seek the Republican presidential nomination in 2024.

== Political positions ==
WMUR considers Sununu a moderate Republican. According to National Review, he is a "fiscally conservative" and "socially moderate" politician in a similar vein to Rockefeller Republicans. He has also been described as a "hardcore libertarian". In a discussion with ABC, Sununu said: "Liberal elites in Washington want to stand on the shoulders of hardworking American families that built this country, defended this country and tell them how to live their lives. They're angry. They're upset. That's the culture change that people want to see... it's about prioritiz[ing] states' rights, individual rights and parents' rights." He has said that "cancel culture ... has really infiltrated all across America."

Sununu vetoed 57 bills as governor in 2019.

=== Economic and fiscal ===
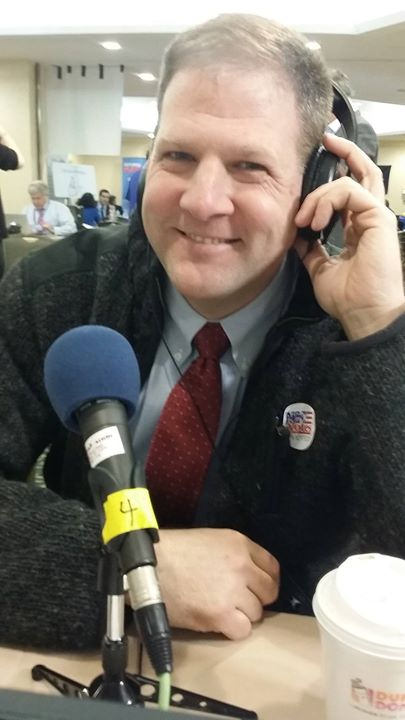
Sununu being interviewed on the Rich Girard radio program, February 2016

Sununu opposes New Hampshire's 5% tax on dividends and interest income. After his 2020 reelection, he called for newly elected Republican majorities in the New Hampshire House and Senate to pass a law phasing out this tax by 2026, saying that it unfairly targets senior citizens living off of these types of income and their retirement accounts. He also sought to slightly reduce other taxes, and to institute student loan relief for those going into health care and social work.

Sununu has supported tax cuts for businesses and a reduction in property taxes. After the 2018 midterm elections, which gave Democrats control of the New Hampshire legislature, Sununu vowed to veto their proposal to create a broader state income tax, as well as several other new taxes and fees. Sununu signed a bill making it easier for medical facilities to be licensed to treat veterans. He also opposed the Senate's Republican health care plan in 2017, citing that the proposal would negatively affect Medicaid and addiction recovery services in the state.

Sununu supports legislation to provide state-funded "school choice vouchers to disadvantaged and low-income students"; such vouchers could be used at religious and private schools. After the 2018 midterm elections, in which Democrats regained control of the New Hampshire legislature, Sununu vetoed a bill to establish a paid family leave policy that would have instituted a statewide payroll tax.

Sununu nominated 27 New Hampshire "opportunity zones" to receive federal tax breaks for low-income areas. These included Waterville Valley, a low-income town that is the locale of the Sununu family's Waterville Valley Resorts. The family and resort did not take advantage of the tax breaks but later expanded their investment in the resort, allowing them to, if they later pursued the tax advantages, "defer paying taxes on those gains for seven years and get a 15% discount on the tax liability. In addition, they could avoid paying taxes on any future capital gains from the resort if they hold on to it for a decade".

In April 2025, Sununu said that unlike Congress, Americans would "absolutely" accept "ending Medicaid and Medicare and social security," along with increasing the retirement age beyond 67, in order to slash the national debt. He also said that "No young person thinks retirement should be in the mid-60s or 67."

=== DOGE ===
In April 2025, former New Hampshire Governor Chris Sununu voiced both support and criticism regarding Elon Musk’s approach to cutting federal spending as head of the Department of Government Efficiency (DOGE). Sununu said that he agreed with Musk’s underlying goals, including major spending cuts and eliminating bureaucratic waste and explicitly supported large-scale job reductions in the federal government. However, Sununu criticized Musk’s messaging strategy as counterproductive and lacking empathy and described Musk’s "chainsaw" rhetoric and abrupt mass layoffs as politically tone-deaf and unnecessarily harsh, warning that such tactics made it difficult for lawmakers to defend or explain the changes to their constituents.

=== Energy ===
In late June 2018 and again on June 4, 2019, Sununu vetoed New Hampshire Senate Bill 446, which would have increased the limit for renewable energy projects participating in net metering from 1 megawatt (MW) to 5 MW. A veto override vote held in 2018 by the New Hampshire House of Representatives failed to achieve a two-thirds majority.

In a statement about his veto of Senate Bill 446 (and a separate bill, Senate Bill 365), Sununu said the bills would collectively cost New Hampshire electric ratepayers (consumers) around $100 million over three years. "While I agree that expanding net metering could be a benefit to our state, Senate Bill 446 would cost ratepayers at least $5 to $10 million annually and is a handout to large-scale energy developers", Sununu said. "These immense projects should use incentives already available and compete on their own merits."

In his 2020 budget address, Sununu proposed the creation of the New Hampshire Department of Energy, which he said will "streamline government" and "eliminate redundancies." One focus of the department will be the development of offshore wind along New Hampshire's shoreline in the Gulf of Maine, a longstanding priority of Sununu's.

=== Donald Trump ===
In 2016, Sununu reluctantly supported Donald Trump in the 2016 United States presidential election, but in 2019, he called himself a "Trump guy through and through". Unlike other moderate Republican governors like Charlie Baker of Massachusetts, Larry Hogan of Maryland, and Phil Scott of Vermont (all of whom chose not to support Trump for reelection in 2020), Sununu supported Trump and voted for him in 2020.

In the aftermath of Trump's attempts to overturn the 2020 presidential election, Sununu accepted Joe Biden's victory and emerged as a critic of Trump. Nevertheless, he said in early 2023 that he would vote for Trump if he became the Republican nominee for president in 2024. After ruling out a 2024 run of his own, Sununu encouraged Republican primary candidates without a chance of winning to drop out of the race to prevent vote splitting that would lead to a Trump victory in the primaries. In December 2023, Sununu endorsed Nikki Haley for president in the 2024 United States presidential election. He campaigned for Haley; in January 2024, The New York Times called him "an energetic, unusually involved ally" of Haley's. He officially endorsed Trump in March 2024 after Trump became the presumptive Republican nominee.

=== Social ===
Sununu has said that he supports legal abortion, but does not support taxpayer funding for abortions and supports a ban on partial-birth abortion. In 2015, as a member of the New Hampshire Executive Council, he voted to defund Planned Parenthood. He later reversed his position and voted to restore the funding. In 2018, he said "I'm pro-choice. I support Roe v. Wade." Sununu had supported other contracts with Planned Parenthood. In 2022, in response to reports that the Supreme Court may overturn Roe v. Wade, he said, "I'm a pro-choice governor" and that he supports abortion rights in New Hampshire.

In 2019, Sununu vetoed a bill that would have banned people from carrying firearms on school property.

During a 2016 gubernatorial debate, he said he opposed the settling of 10,000 Syrian refugees in the United States.

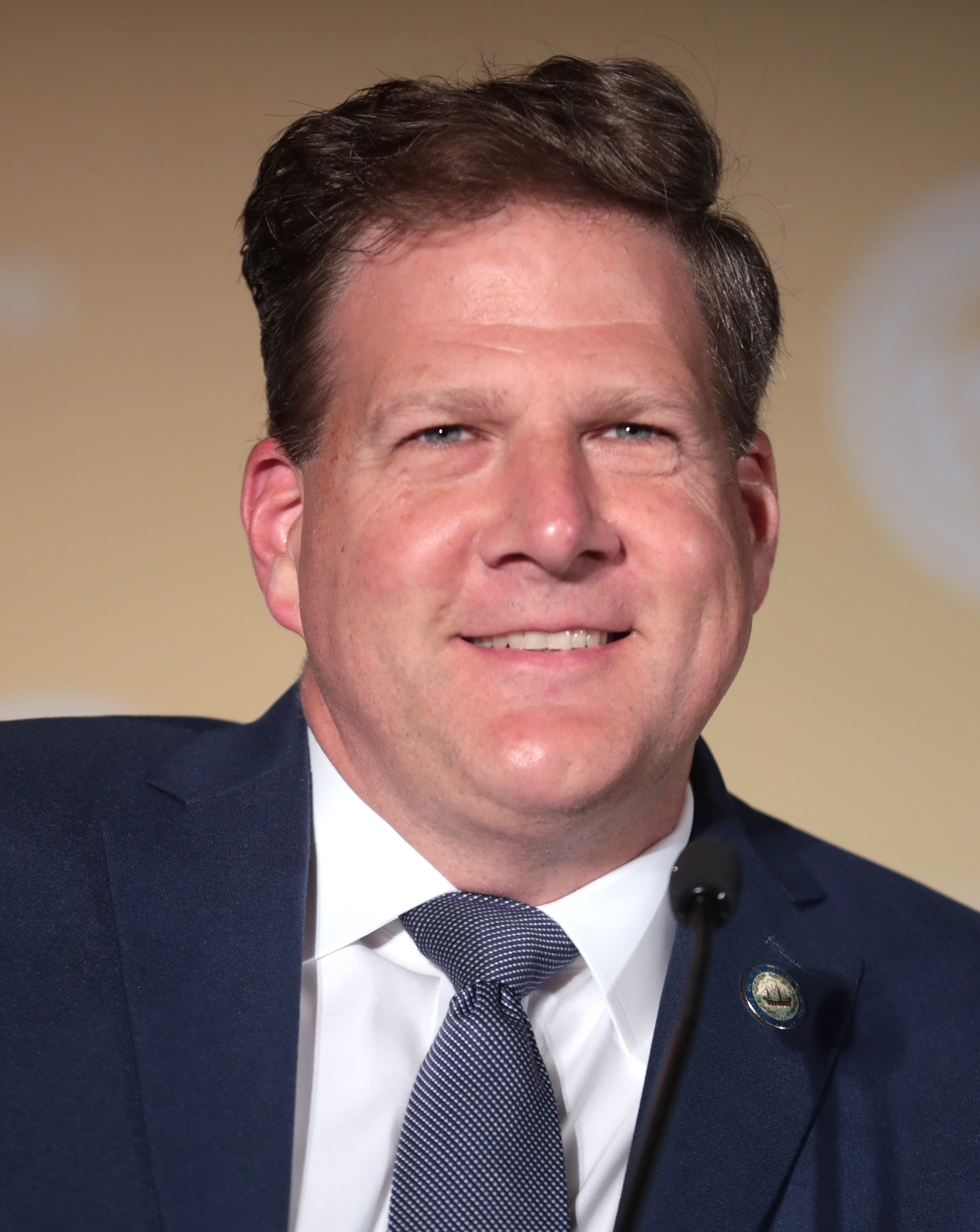
Sununu in 2022

In 2017, Sununu signed Senate Bill 12, which enacted the right to carry a handgun without a permit in New Hampshire.

In 2018, Sununu said he would refuse to send the New Hampshire National Guard to the US-Mexico border to enforce Trump's "zero-tolerance" policy in regard to undocumented immigrants.

Sununu is seen as supportive of LGBT rights; he said that he does not get involved with the state's GOP platform issues and spoke at an event for the Log Cabin Republicans, the LGBT wing of the Republican Party. In 2018, Sununu signed into law two bills intended to protect LGBT rights, one prohibiting discrimination based on gender identity in housing, employment, and public accommodations and one banning conversion therapy from being used on minors. In 2019, he allowed a bill to become a law without his signature that created a non-binary gender option for driver's licenses, but also vetoed a bill to make it easier for transgender people to change their birth certificates, saying he believed the process was fine as is. Proponents of the bill responded that Sununu lacked understanding of the challenges the transgender community faced. In 2022, Sununu said he would veto a "parental bill of rights" that critics claimed would have forced schools to disclose students' gender identities to their parents. The bill died in the New Hampshire House of Representatives.

On July 18, 2024, Sununu signed three bills limiting transgender rights. The first bill bans trans girls from girls sports in grades 5 to 12. The second bans gender-affirming genital surgeries for minors and the third requires teachers to allow parents to have their child opt out of instruction about "sexual orientation, gender, gender identity, or gender expression". Sununu vetoed a fourth bill that would have allowed businesses and government entities to discriminate against trans people.

Sununu has shifted his position on legalizing recreational marijuana. In 2018, he said it was "terrible" that the Democratic Party's platform supported legalization, and that he would "absolutely" veto legislation "regardless of what the language looks like". In 2022, he softened his stance, saying, "I think it's going to ultimately happen in New Hampshire", and that the best way to do it would be by selling it in state-run stores, as is done with alcohol. In 2023, he announced: "I stand ready to sign a legalization bill that puts the State of NH in the drivers seat, focusing on harm reduction—not profits."

In 2020, Sununu joined Democrats in supporting permanent funding for conservation efforts in the U.S. and particularly in New Hampshire.

=== Law enforcement reform ===
After the murder of George Floyd, Sununu established the New Hampshire Commission on Law Enforcement Accountability, Community, and Transparency (LEACT). LEACT was created to examine police training and procedures and to report and investigate police misconduct and the relationship between law enforcement and New Hampshire communities. In September 2020, LEACT submitted 50 recommendations to Sununu, ranging from the creation of an independent oversight commission to review allegations of police misconduct to the recommendation that all police officers in the state wear body cameras. Sununu endorsed all the recommendations, and said he would direct the New Hampshire State Police to comply with the recommendation to use body cameras.

=== COVID-19 ===
In December 2021, Sununu asked President Joe Biden and FEMA for emergency response teams to deal with a surge in COVID-19 cases in New Hampshire.

== President & CEO, Airlines for America ==
On August 18, 2025, Airlines for America, a trade organization representing many of the largest air carriers in the United States, announced that Sununu would become the organization’s new President and Chief Executive Officer effective September 9, 2025.

== Personal life ==
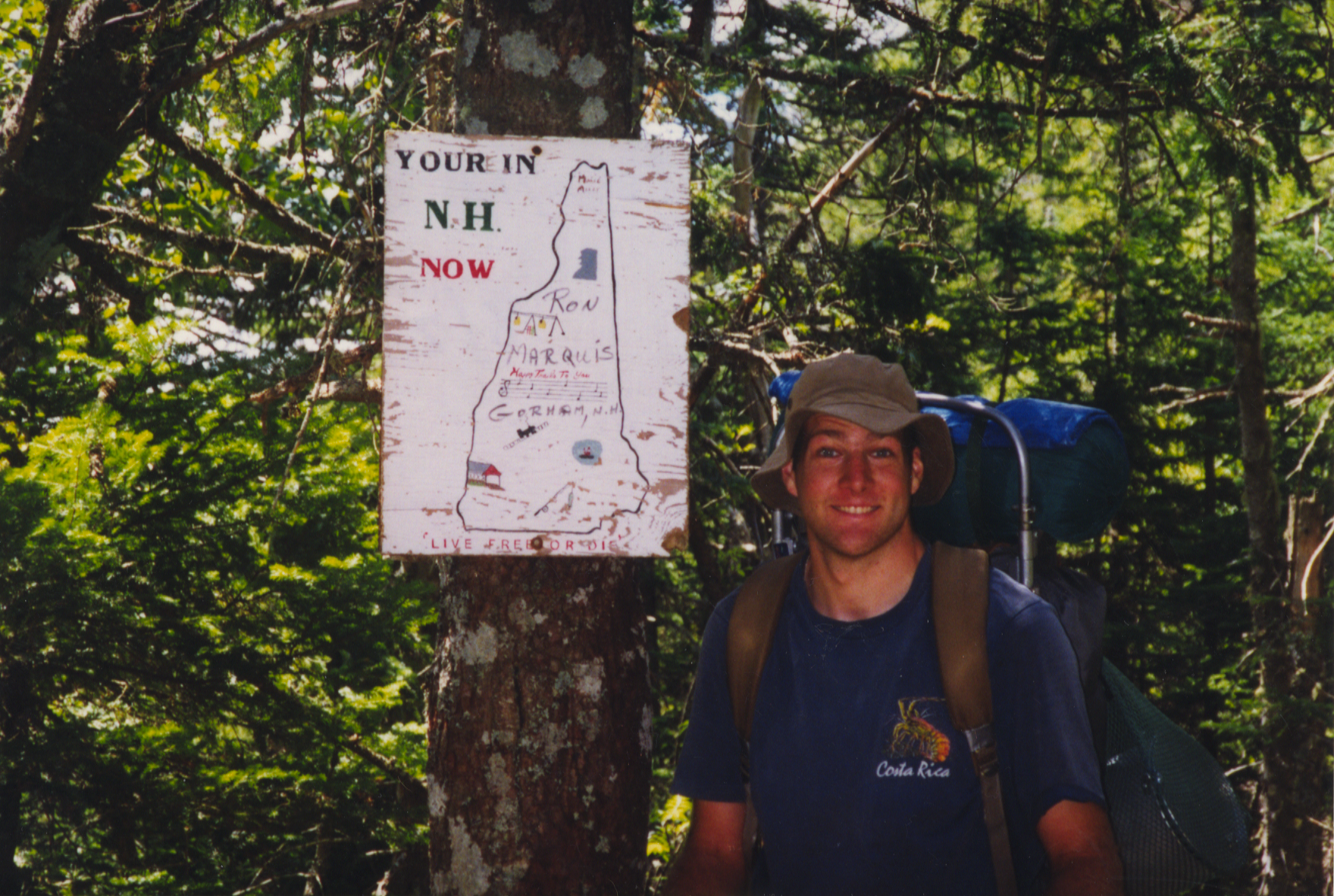
In 1998, Chris Sununu completed a five-month through-hike of the Appalachian Trail from Maine to Georgia.

Sununu met his future wife, Valerie, in college; they married in 2001. The couple and their three children, Calvin, Edith and Leonardo, live in Newfields, New Hampshire.

Sununu is an active skier and rugby player. In 1998, he completed a five-month through-hike of the Appalachian Trail from Maine to Georgia.

In September 2024, Sununu saved a choking contestant at a lobster roll eating contest by performing the Heimlich maneuver.

== Electoral history ==
Executive Council 1st term

In 2010, Sununu defeated incumbent Executive Councilor Beverly Hollingworth by 53,053 votes to 41,875, or 55.9% to 44.1%.

Executive Council 2nd term

In 2012, Sununu defeated Bill Duncan, 75,856 votes to 55,432, or 55.2% to 40.3%, with 4.5% going to Libertarian candidate Michael Baldassarre.

Executive Council 3rd term

In 2014, Sununu defeated Robin McLane, 61,601 votes to 38,420, or 61.6% to 38.4%.

2016 New Hampshire gubernatorial election
Party	Candidate	Votes	%
Republican	Chris Sununu	354,040	48.84%
Democratic	Colin Van Ostern	337,589	46.57%
Libertarian	Max Abramson	31,243	4.29%
Total votes		724,863	100.00%
Republican gain from Democratic			

2018 New Hampshire gubernatorial election
Party	Candidate	Votes	%	±%
Republican	Chris Sununu (incumbent)	302,764	52.78%	+3.94%
Democratic	Molly Kelly	262,359	45.74%	−0.83%
Libertarian	Jilletta Jarvis	8,197	1.43%	−2.88%
Write-in		282	0.05%	-0.23%
Total votes		573,602	100.0%	
Republican hold				

2020 New Hampshire gubernatorial election
Party	Candidate	Votes	%	±%
Republican	Chris Sununu (incumbent)	516,609	65.12%	+12.34%
Democratic	Dan Feltes	264,639	33.36%	−12.38%
Libertarian	Darryl W. Perry	11,329	1.43%	0.00%
Write-in		683	0.09%	+0.04%
Total votes		793,260	100.0%	
Republican hold				

2022 New Hampshire gubernatorial election
Party	Candidate	Votes	%	±%
Republican	Chris Sununu (incumbent)	352,813	56.98%	−8.14%
Democratic	Tom Sherman	256,766	41.47%	+8.11%
Libertarian	Kelly Halldorson	5,071	0.82%	N/A
Libertarian	Karlyn Borysenko	2,772	0.45%	N/A
Write-in		1,713	0.28%	+0.19%
Total votes		619,135	100.0%	
Republican hold				

Party political offices
Preceded by Walt Havenstein	Republican nominee for Governor of New Hampshire; 2016, 2018, 2020, 2022	Succeeded by Kelly Ayotte
Political offices
Preceded by Chuck Morse; Acting	Governor of New Hampshire; 2017–2025	Succeeded by Kelly Ayotte
U.S. order of precedence (ceremonial)
Preceded by John Lynch as Former Governor	Order of precedence of the United States; Within New Hampshire	Succeeded by Jack Markell as Former Governor
Preceded by John Lynch as Former Governor	Order of precedence of the United States; Outside New Hampshire	Succeeded by Douglas Wilder as Former Governor
