= Donovan Fenton =

American politician

Member of the New Hampshire Senate from the 10th district
- Incumbent
- Assumed office December 7, 2022
- Preceded by: Jay Kahn

Member of the New Hampshire House of Representatives from the Cheshire 8th district
- In office December 7, 2016 – December 7, 2022
- Preceded by: Cynthia Chase
- Succeeded by: Lucius Parshall (redistricted)

Personal details
- Born: November 26, 1988 (age 37) Keene, New Hampshire, U.S.
- Party: Democratic
- Education: Towson University (BA); George Washington University (MA)

Donovan Fenton (born November 26, 1988) is an American businessman and a New Hampshire politician. A member of the Democratic Party, he has represented the 10th district in the New Hampshire Senate since 2022. He previously served three terms in the New Hampshire House of Representatives, representing the Cheshire 8th district from 2016 to 2022.

A native of Keene and a vice president of his family's automobile dealership business, Fenton was 33 when he entered the Senate, making him its youngest member in roughly half a century. He has focused on housing and child care costs, road safety, homelessness, and restrictions on out-of-state waste disposal, and has been a prominent Democratic critic of the state's school voucher program. He currently has served as second vice chair of the New Hampshire Democratic Party since March 2025.

== Early life and education ==
Fenton was born and raised in Keene. He received a Bachelor of Arts in social sciences from Towson University in 2012 and a Master of Arts in political management from the George Washington University Graduate School of Political Management in 2015. Fenton has served on the boards of the Cedarcrest Center for Children with Disabilities and The Community Kitchen, both in Keene, and was appointed to the New Hampshire Canadian Trade Council in 2017.

== New Hampshire House of Representatives ==
Fenton was elected to the New Hampshire House of Representatives in 2016, representing the Cheshire 8th district, and was re-elected in 2018 and 2020. He sat on the Environment and Agriculture and Transportation committees. In 2021, he was the main sponsor of a bill requiring children under two to be secured in rear-facing child restraints, which he said would "fill the gap in child safety laws in New Hampshire."

== New Hampshire Senate ==
In May 2022, Fenton announced a run for New Hampshire's 10th State Senate district being vacated by retiring Democrat Jay Kahn. The district covers 15 municipalities, 13 in Cheshire County as well as Hancock and Peterborough. He defeated Keene city councilor Bobby Williams in the Democratic primary and Republican Sylvester Karasinski in the general election, taking office on December 7, 2022.

As of the 2025-2026 session he serves on the Senate committees on Capital Budget, Commerce, Transportation, and Ways and Means. In 2025, Republican governor Kelly Ayotte named him to her Highway Safety Task Force. In December 2024, at the suggestion of a class of 4th graders from Chesterfield, Fenton introduced a bill to designate the Virginia opossum as New Hampshire's official state marsupial, drawing 14 co-sponsors from both parties.

=== Transportation ===
In 2025, Fenton sponsored "Sherrill's Law," which expanded New Hampshire's "move over" law to cover any stopped vehicle displaying hazard lights or flares and was named for a state police sergeant killed in 2021. In 2026, he was the main sponsor of a law sharply increasing penalties for handheld mobile phone use while driving, a measure whose Senate co-sponsors were mostly Republicans. In 2023, Fenton worked with Republican Sen. Denise Ricciardi to pass a bill making it more difficult for thieves to fence catalytic converters, which was signed into law by Gov. Chris Sununu.

In 2026, Fenton co-sponsored legislation that passed the Senate by voice vote, which would raise tolls for drivers from outside of New Hampshire on the New Hampshire Turnpike, the state's portion of Interstate 95.

=== Housing and homelessness ===
Fenton said during his campaign in 2024 that New Hampshire needs roughly 60,000 additional units of affordable housing and that first-time home buyers are "priced out of the market." In 2025, he offered an unsuccessful amendment on accessory dwelling units that would have served as a compromise between larger towns that wanted their construction and smaller ones that wanted greater local control. He has also legislated on homelessness, sponsoring bills in 2024 and 2025 to raise the state's shelter reimbursement rate and fund eviction prevention.

=== Education ===
In 2025, he worked with Republican senator Timothy Lang on a bill allowing school boards to expand eligibility for free and reduced-price school meals to up to 200% of the poverty line, which passed the Senate unanimously but died in the House. It failed again in the House in 2026, with Fenton saying, "We are gonna feed these kids one of these days."

=== Child care and labor ===
Fenton has said that his son was on a waiting list for child care, and that his wife, a former daycare teacher, had found her full-time wage to be less than the cost of getting care for their first child. He has criticized Republican-backed child care tax credit proposals for excluding employers that are too small to operate their own facilities, arguing that small businesses needed support to help give parents who worked for them adequate child care. Fenton also sponsored legislation that passed both houses of the New Hampshire General Court which would have allowed people with work permits but not citizenship to get a New Hampshire Driver's license, but Gov. Sununu vetoed the legislation.

=== Minimum wage and taxation ===
Fenton opposed changes that would have reduced New Hampshire's two-hour minimum work requirement, and he supported a bill that would have raised the state's minimum wage from $7.25 to $15. Fenton has been among the Senate's most persistent critics of New Hampshire's Education Freedom Account program, describing a 2024 expansion as "a loophole for millionaires to access taxpayer dollars" and later characterizing the accounts as a "subsidy" for private schools.

=== Other political positions ===
Fenton opposed a GOP bill that would restrict what foods SNAP funds could be spent on, noting, "to dictate what people can eat and cannot eat is ridiculous." He supports legalizing recreational cannabis, arguing that the state continues "to arrest people in New Hampshire for something that is legal a few miles away." Fenton sponsored a bill in 2023 establishing a committee to study out-of-state waste disposal that was enacted, but a broader landfill moratorium he championed the following year failed, warning that New Hampshire would "become the trash magnet for all of New England" based on current trends.

== Electoral history ==
=== 2026 Congressional speculation ===
In 2025, Fenton was among the Democrats reported to be considering a run for the state's 2nd Congressional District, should there have been an open seat.

=== 2024 ===
2024 New Hampshire State Senate election, District 10
Party	Candidate	Votes	%
Democratic	Donovan Fenton (Incumbent)	20,841	63.12
Republican	Rick Merkt	12,166	36.85
Write-in		11	0.03
Total votes		33,018	100.0
Democratic hold			

=== 2022 ===
2022 New Hampshire State Senate election, District 10
Primary election
Party	Candidate	Votes	%
Democratic	Donovan Fenton	4,525	66.8
Democratic	Bobby Williams	2,250	33.2
Total votes		6,775	100
General election
Democratic	Donovan Fenton	17,305	66.1
Republican	Sly Karasinski	8,860	33.9
Total votes		26,165	100
Democratic hold			

=== 2020 ===
2020 New Hampshire House of Representatives election, Cheshire 8th
Party	Candidate	Votes	%
Democratic	Donovan Fenton (Incumbent)	Unopposed	
Total votes		2,321	100.0
Democratic hold			

=== 2018 ===
2018 New Hampshire House of Representatives election, Cheshire 8th
Party	Candidate	Votes	%
Democratic	Donovan Fenton	1,576	70.3
Republican	John Therriault	661	29.5
Democratic hold			

=== 2016 ===
2018 New Hampshire House of Representatives election, Cheshire 8th
Party	Candidate	Votes	%
Democratic	Donovan Fenton (Incumbent)	Unopposed	
Total votes			100.0
Democratic hold			

== Personal life ==
Fenton lives in Keene with his wife, Jacqueline, and their three children. Fenton is a vice president of Fenton Family Dealerships, his family's automobile retail business based in Swanzey, and operates a Subaru dealership in Keene.
