= Andrew Yang campaign endorsements =

Andrew Yang campaign endorsements may refer to:

- List of Andrew Yang 2020 presidential campaign endorsements
- List of Andrew Yang 2021 New York City mayoral campaign endorsements
