= List of Andrew Yang 2020 presidential campaign endorsements =

- Campaign: 2020 United States presidential election (Democratic Party primaries)
- Candidate: Andrew Yang; Entrepreneur; Founder of Venture for America
- Affiliation: Democratic Party
- Status: Withdrawn
- Launched: November 6, 2017
- Headquarters: New York City, New York
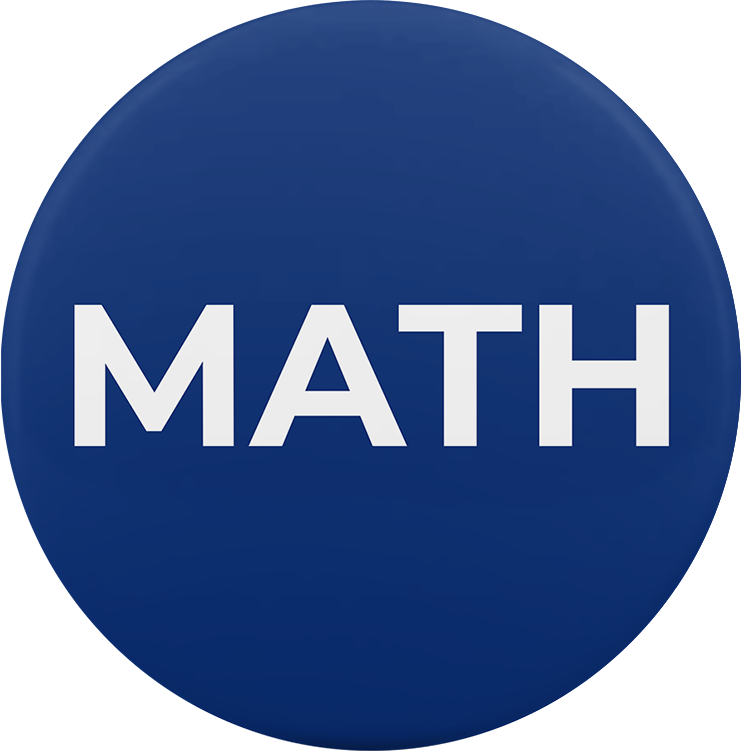
- Slogan(s): Humanity First; Not Left, Not Right, Forward; A New Way Forward; Make America Think Harder (MATH)

Website
- www.yang2020.com

This is a list of notable individuals and organizations who voiced their endorsement of Andrew Yang's campaign for the Democratic Party's nomination for the 2020 U.S. presidential election.

== Federal officials ==
=== U.S. representatives ===
==== Former ====
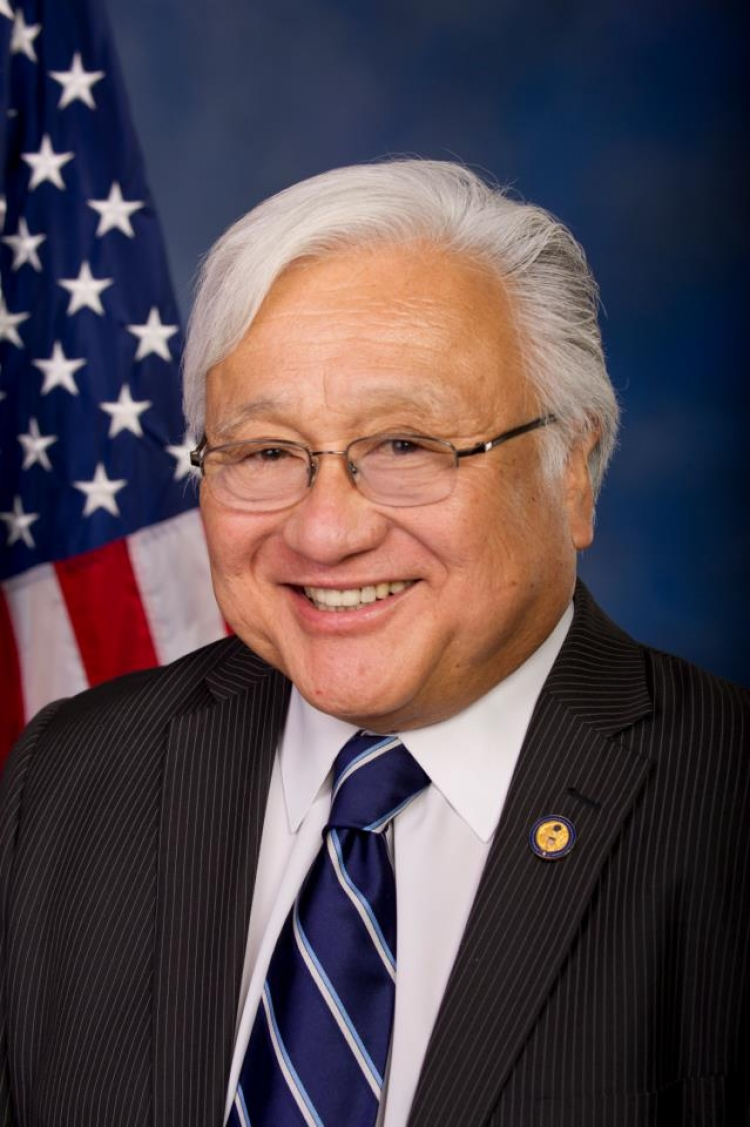
Mike Honda

- Mike Honda, former U.S. representative from CA-15 (2001–2013) and CA-17 (2013–2017)

== State officials ==
=== State legislators ===
==== Current ====
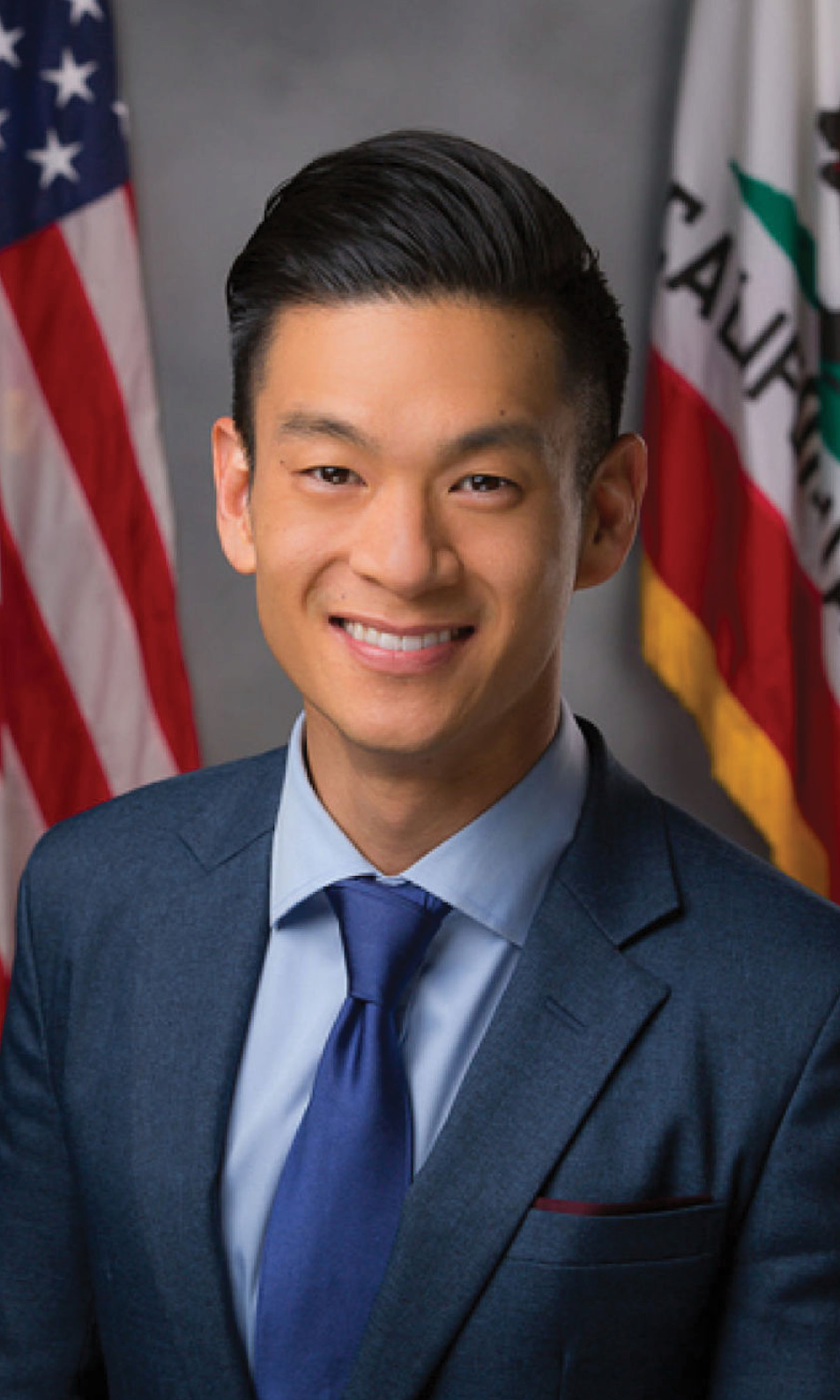
Evan Low

- John Bordenet, member of New Hampshire House of Representatives Cheshire District 05
- Evan Low, member of California's 28th State Assembly district and former mayor of Campbell, California (previously endorsed Kamala Harris)

== Local and municipal officials ==
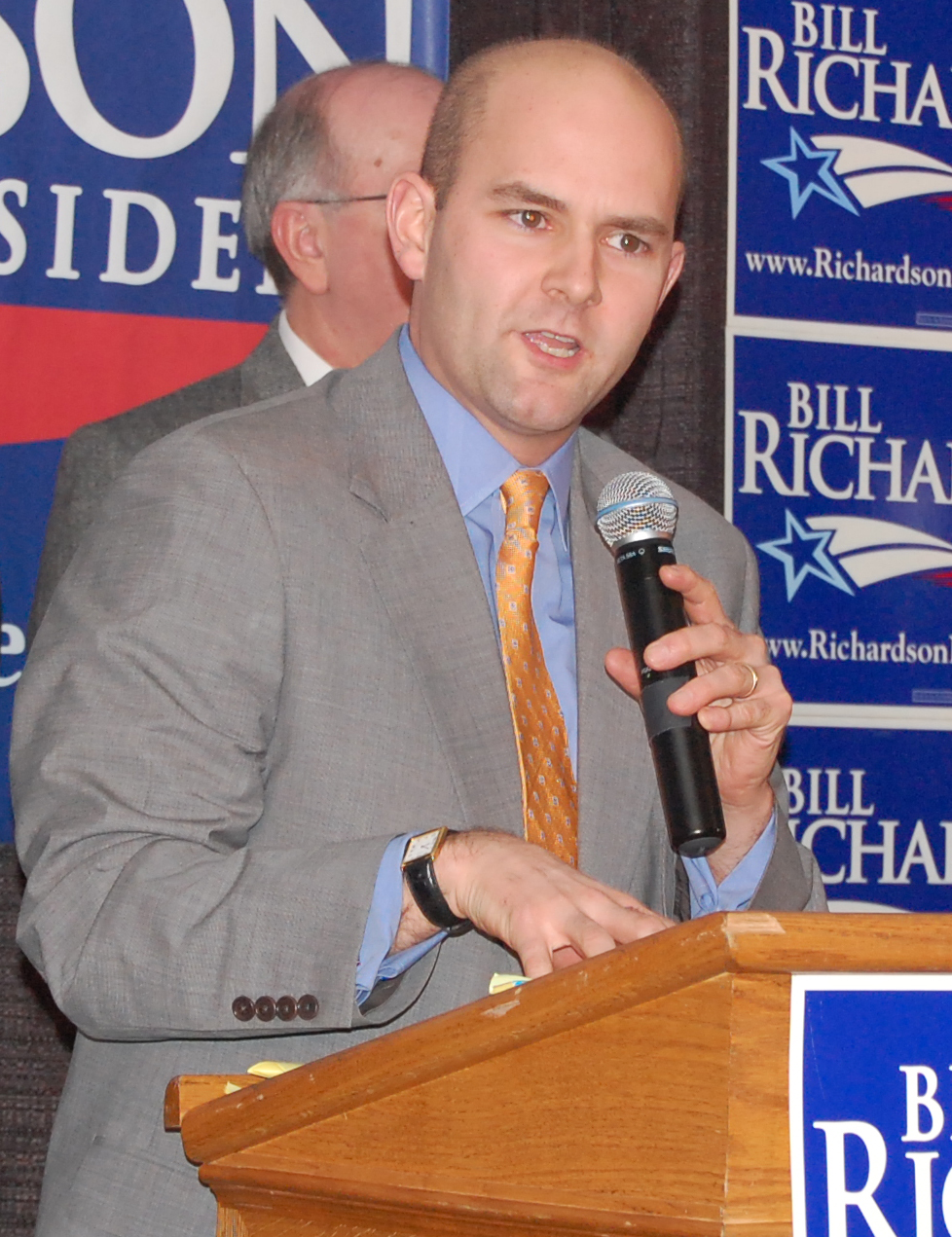
Steve Marchand

=== Mayors ===
==== Current ====
- Barbara Hopkins, mayor of Sellers, South Carolina

==== Former ====
- Steve Marchand, former mayor of Portsmouth, New Hampshire and two-time Democratic gubernatorial candidate for New Hampshire

=== Local officials ===
- Teresa Keng, member of the Fremont, California City Council
- Leslie Want, member of the Manchester, New Hampshire School Board

== Notable individuals ==
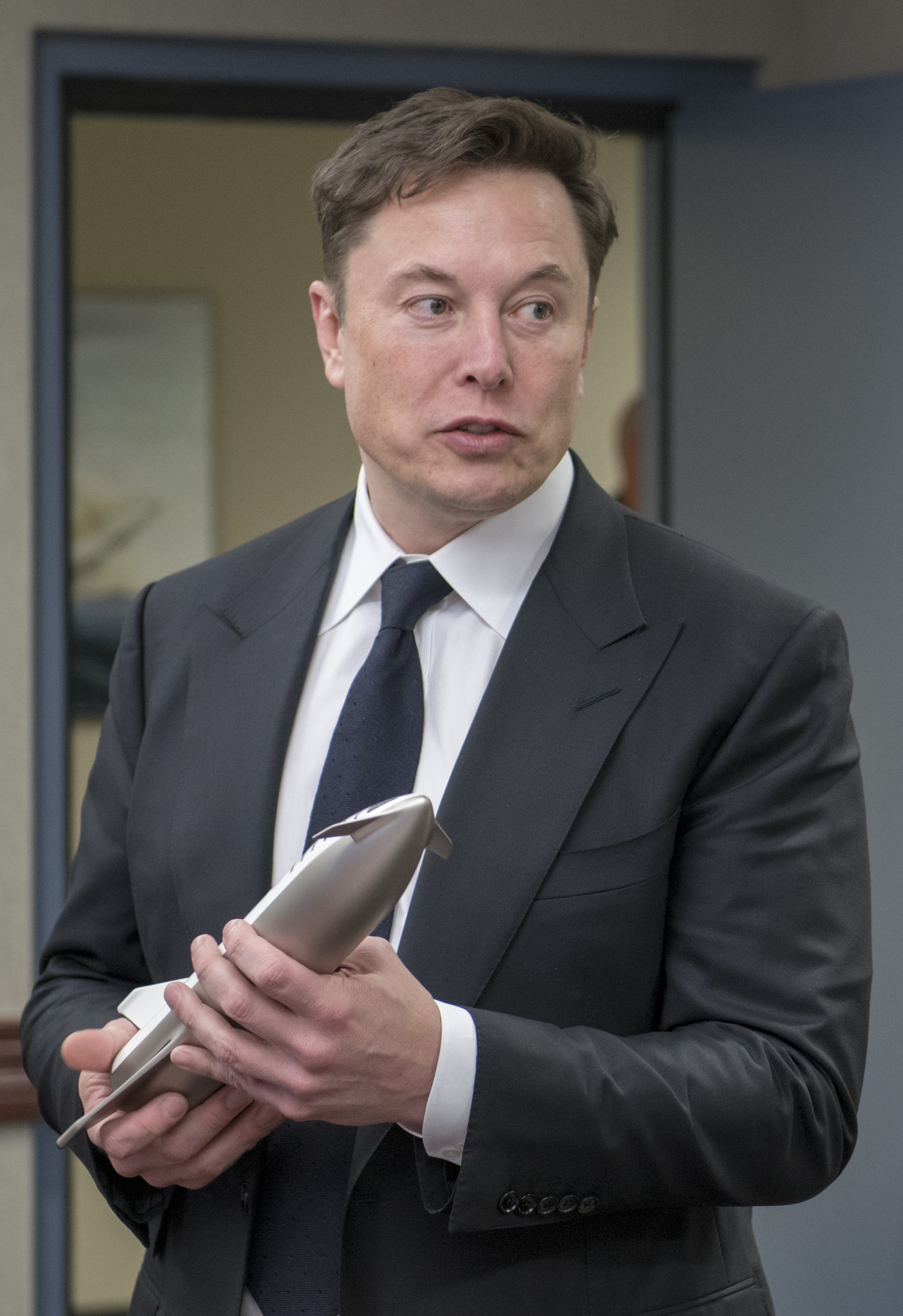
Elon Musk

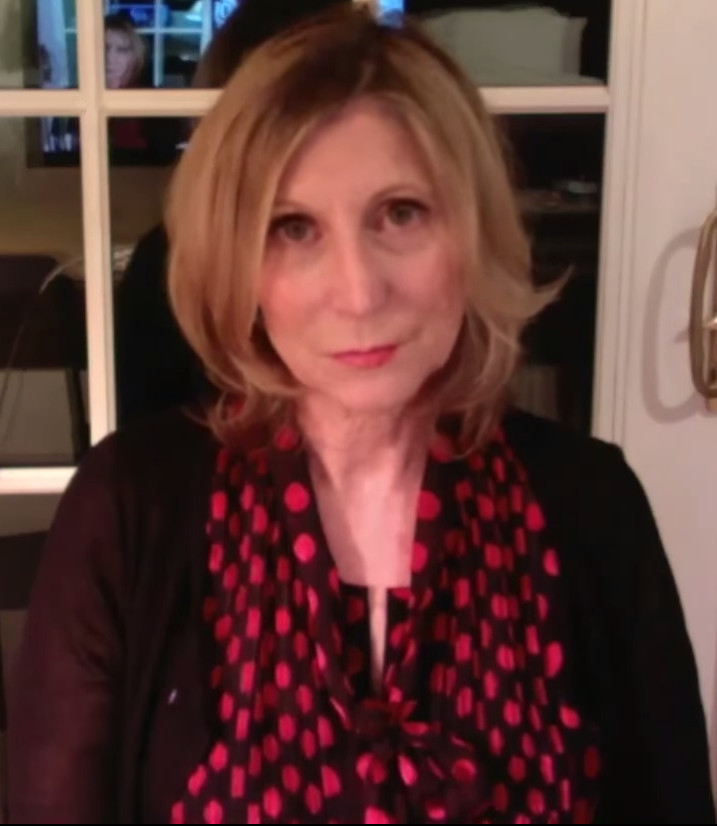
Christina Hoff Sommers

=== Activists ===
- Cameron Kasky, gun control activist and co-founder of March for Our Lives

=== Businesspeople ===
- Sam Altman, entrepreneur and co-chairman of OpenAI
- Jack Dorsey, entrepreneur, computer programmer and CEO of Twitter and Square
- Tony Hsieh, businessman and CEO of Zappos
- James Monsees, businessman and co-founder of Juul
- Elon Musk, entrepreneur, engineer and CEO of Tesla, Inc. and SpaceX
- Alexis Ohanian, entrepreneur, investor, and co-founder of Reddit

=== Journalists and commentators ===
- Bari Weiss, editor and opinion writer for The New York Times

=== Medical doctors ===
- Eugene Gu, former resident physician, social media personality, plaintiff in lawsuit against Donald Trump

=== Scholars and academics ===
- Peter Boghossian, assistant professor of philosophy at Portland State University
- Xudong Huang, medical researcher, co-director of the Neurochemistry Lab of Psychiatry Department at the Massachusetts General Hospital and associate professor of psychiatry at Harvard Medical School
- Christina Hoff Sommers, author, philosopher, and resident scholar at the American Enterprise Institute
- Bret Weinstein, biologist and evolutionary theorist

== Celebrities ==
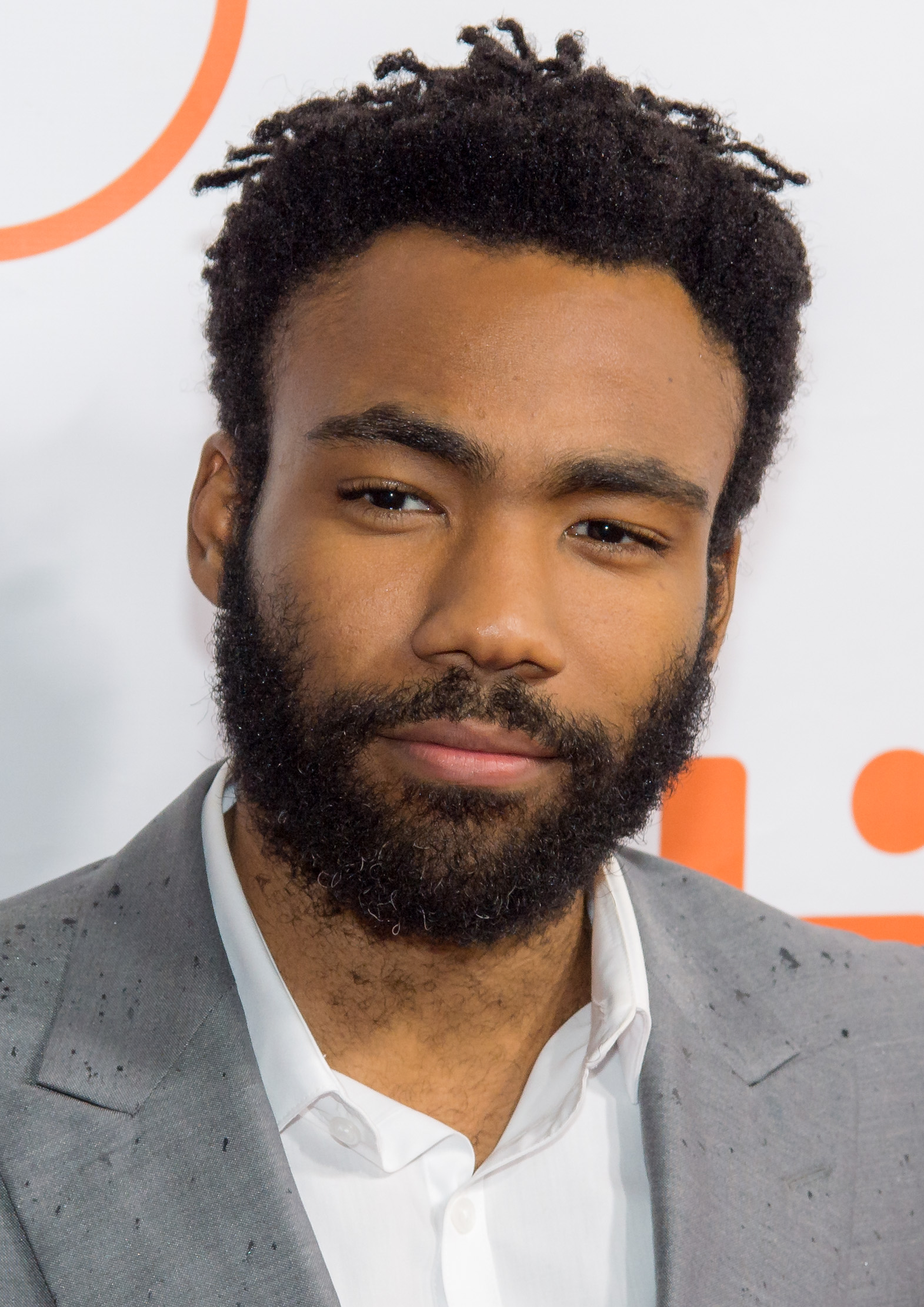
Donald Glover

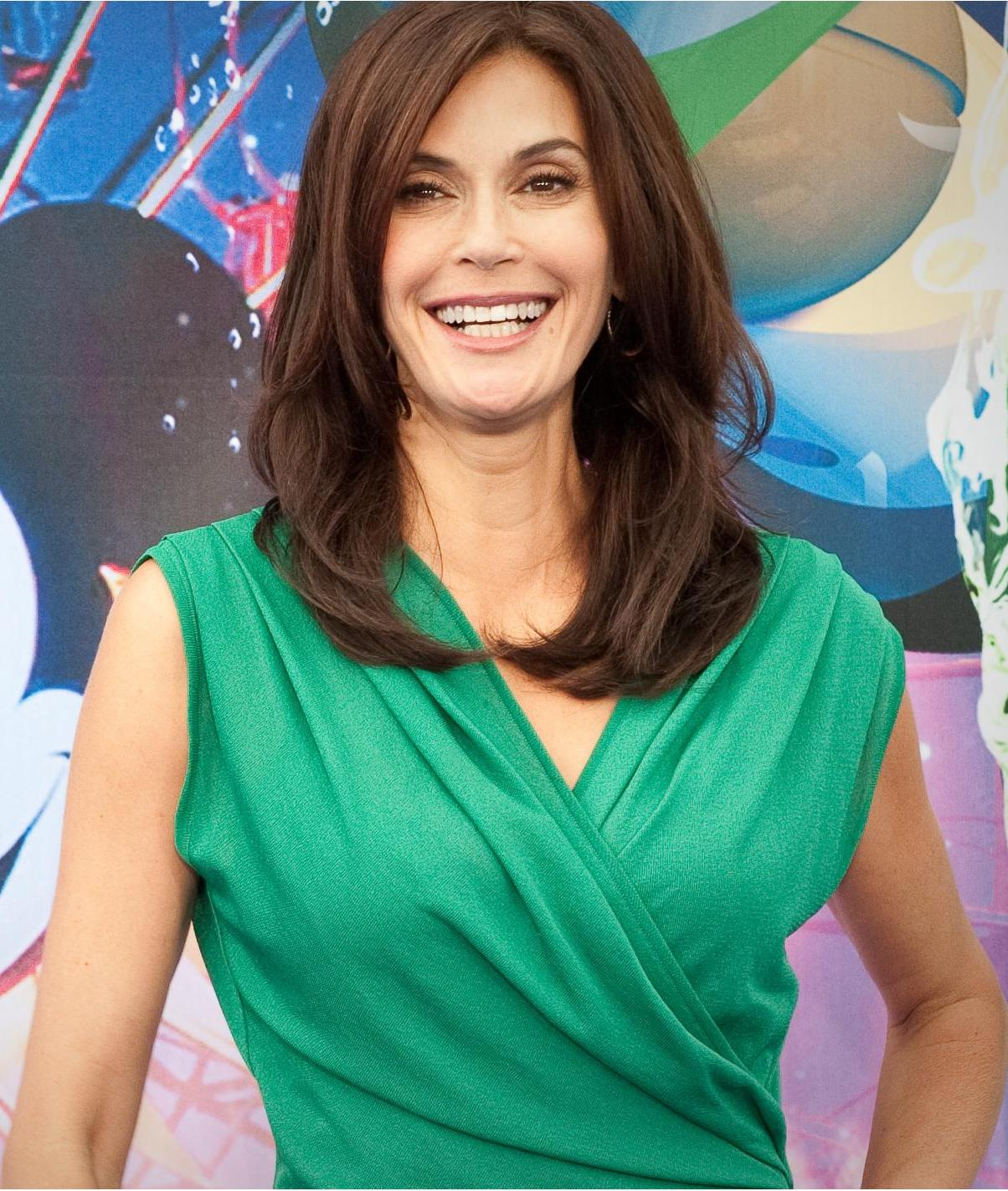
Teri Hatcher

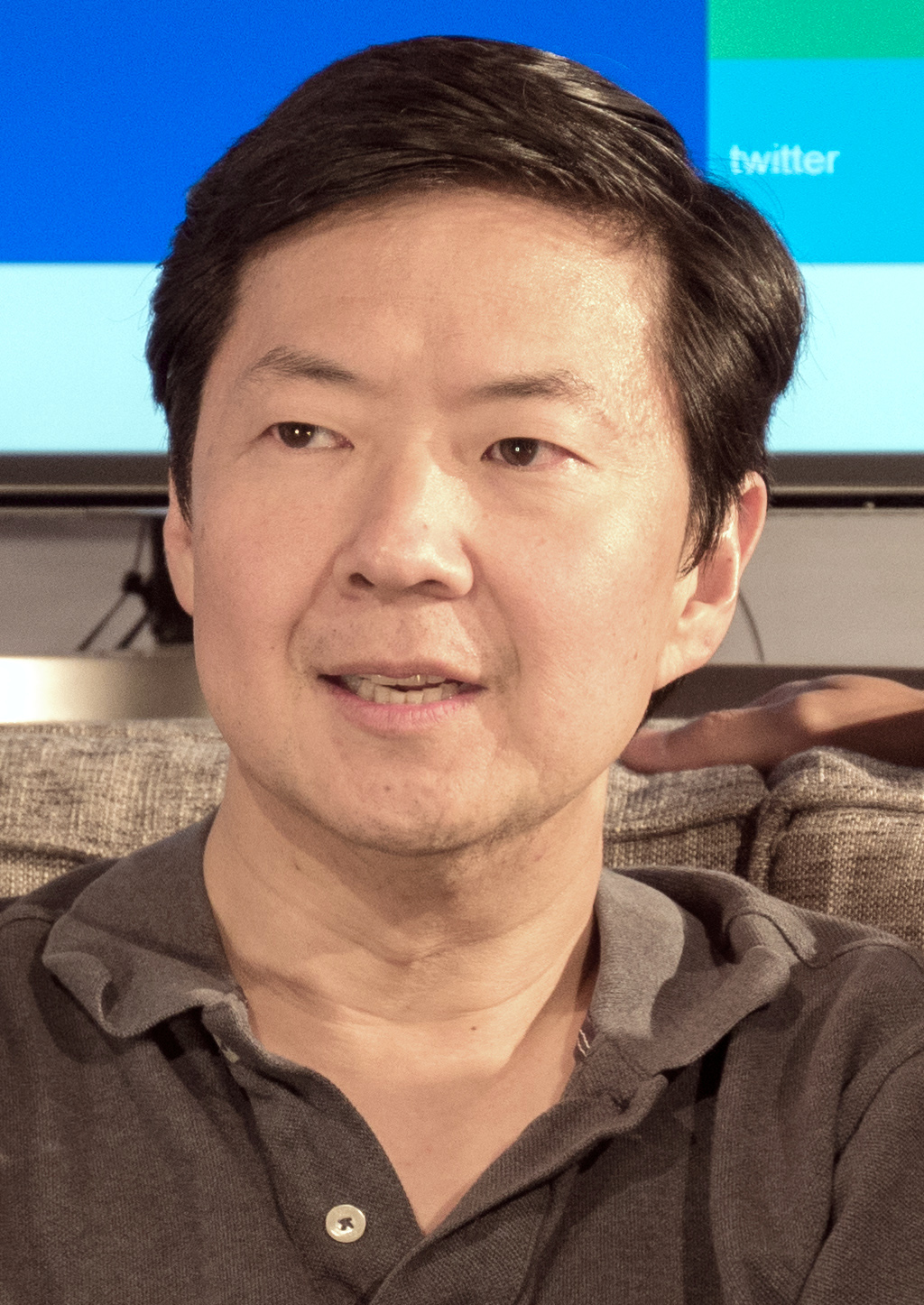
Ken Jeong

=== Actors ===
- Nicolas Cage, actor
- Noah Centineo, actor
- Dane DeHaan, actor
- Donald Glover, actor, comedian, and musician
- Teri Hatcher, actress, writer, presenter, and singer
- Ken Jeong, actor, comedian, former physician, and voice artist
- Penn Jillette, magician and actor
- John Leguizamo, actor (previously endorsed Julián Castro)
- Simu Liu, actor
- Steven Yeun, actor

=== Athletes ===
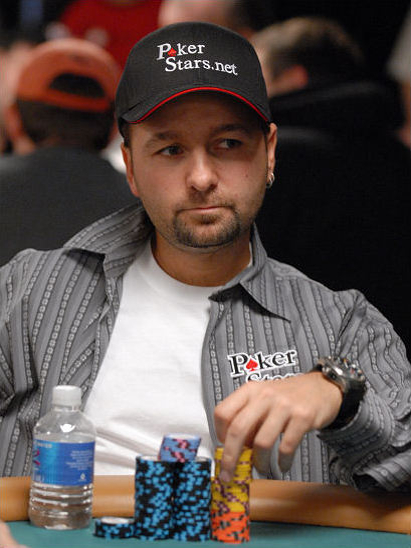
Daniel Negreanu

- Antonio Bryant, former NFL player
- Chris Jericho, Canadian-American professional wrestler
- Jermaine Johnson, former NBA D-League player
- Daniel Negreanu, professional poker player
- Mark Schultz, Olympic wrestler
- Marcellus Wiley, former NFL player
- Dominique Wilkins, former NBA player

=== Comedians ===
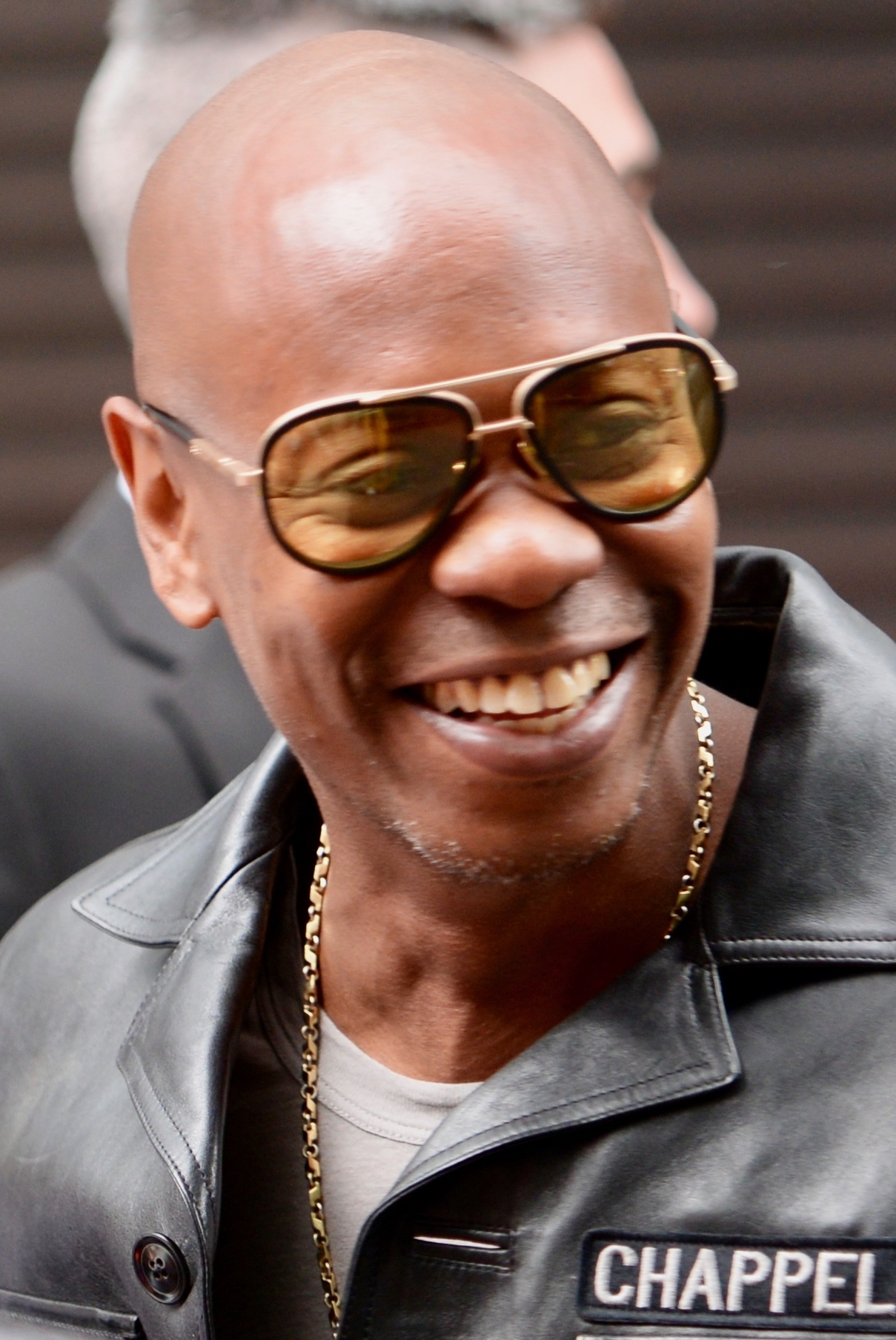
Dave Chappelle

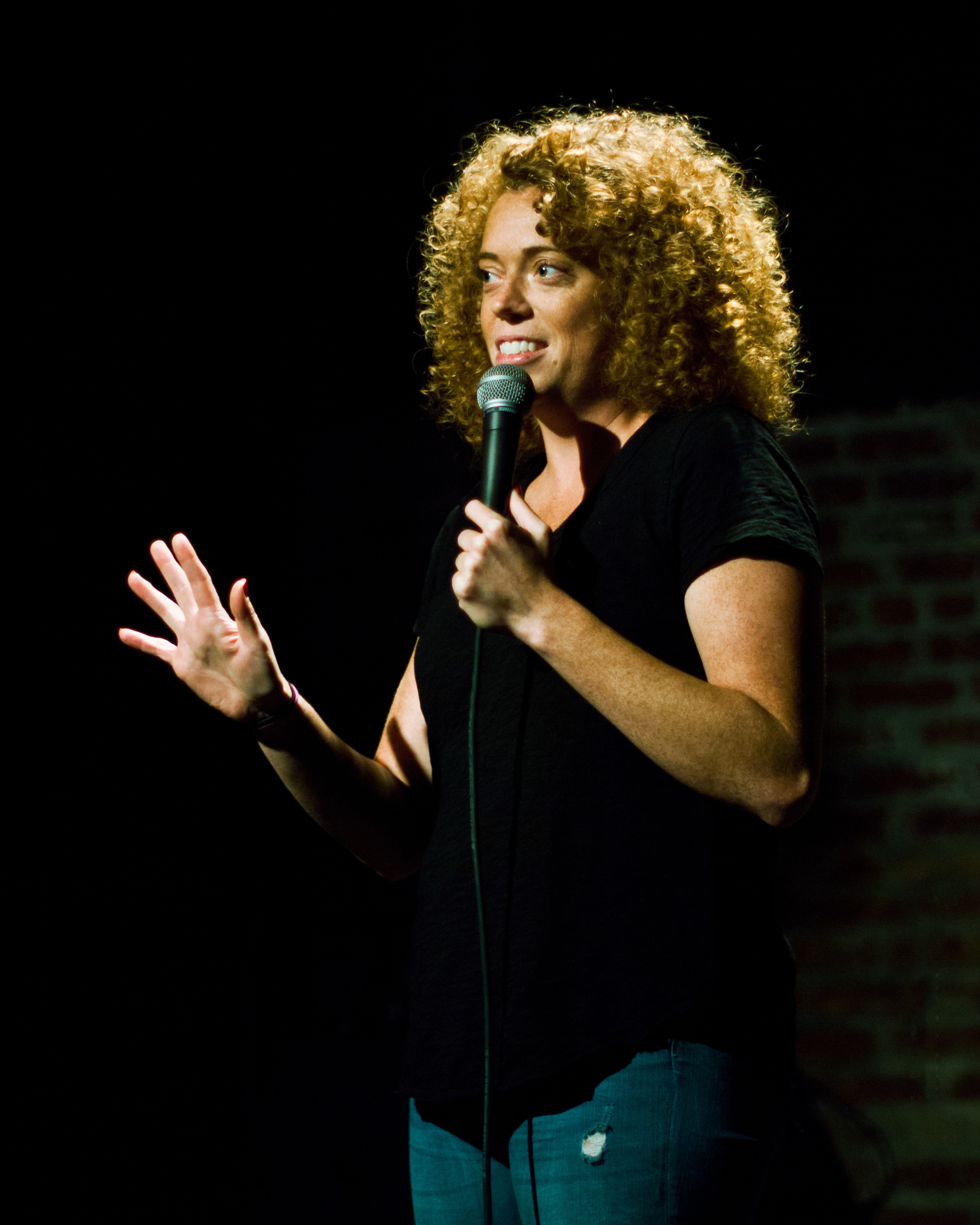
Michelle Wolf

- Hannibal Buress, comedian, actor, writer, and producer
- Dave Chappelle, comedian
- Ronny Chieng, comedian, actor, and correspondent for The Daily Show
- Tommy Chong, Canadian-American actor and comedian
- Norm Macdonald, comedian
- Donnell Rawlings, comedian and actor
- Doug Stanhope, comedian
- Michelle Wolf, comedian
- Joe Wong, comedian

=== Filmmakers ===
- James Gunn, filmmaker and musician
- Kirsten Lepore, animator

=== Internet personalities ===
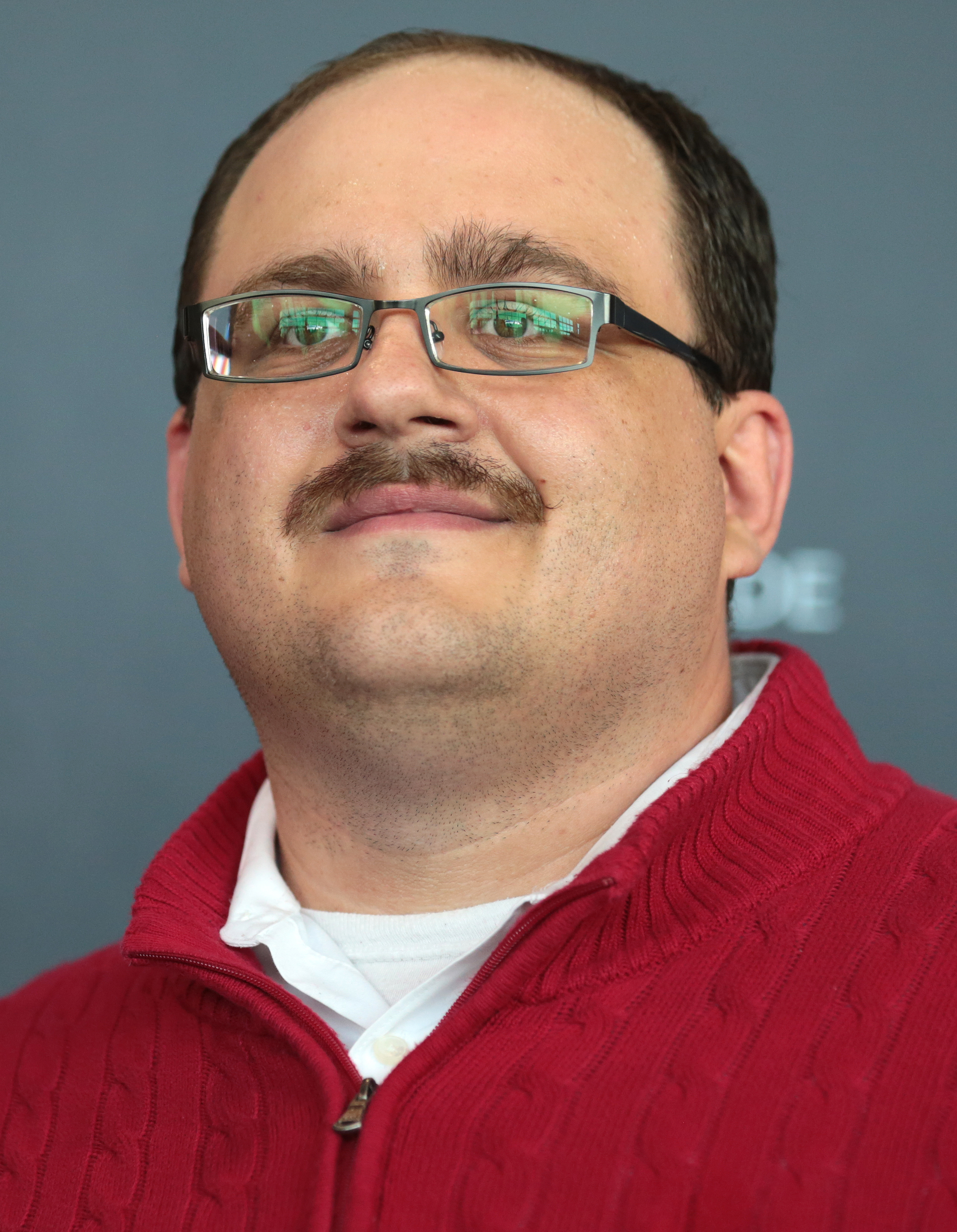
Ken Bone

- Adam22, Internet personality
- Lloyd Ahlquist, Internet personality
- Ken Bone, Internet personality and political activist
- Ryan Higa, Internet personality
- Ethan Klein, Internet personality and YouTuber
- Casey Neistat, Internet personality and filmmaker

=== Musicians ===
- Anita Baker, singer-songwriter
- Rich Brian, musician
- Rivers Cuomo, musician
- Eric B. & Rakim, hip hop duo
- The Fat Boys, hip hop trio
- MC Jin, rapper, actor, and songwriter
- Zhu, electronic musician

== Newspapers and other media ==
=== Newspapers ===
- The Sun, Lowell, Massachusetts
- Sentinel & Enterprise, Fitchburg, Massachusetts

== See also ==
- Endorsements in the 2020 Democratic Party presidential primaries
- News media endorsements in the 2020 United States presidential primaries
