= Cynthia Chase =

American politician (born 1943)

Member of the New Hampshire House of Representatives from the Cheshire 8 district
- In office 2010–2016
- Succeeded by: Donovan Fenton

Personal details
- Born: January 25, 1943 (age 83) Providence, Rhode Island, US
- Party: Democratic
- Education: Plymouth State University; University of Rhode Island

Cynthia Chase (born January 25, 1943) is an American politician. A Democrat, she was a member of the New Hampshire House of Representatives and represented Cheshire 8th district from 2010 to 2016. She moved to New Hampshire from Rhode Island. She was critical of the Free State Project.
