= Molly Kelly =

American politician (born 1949)

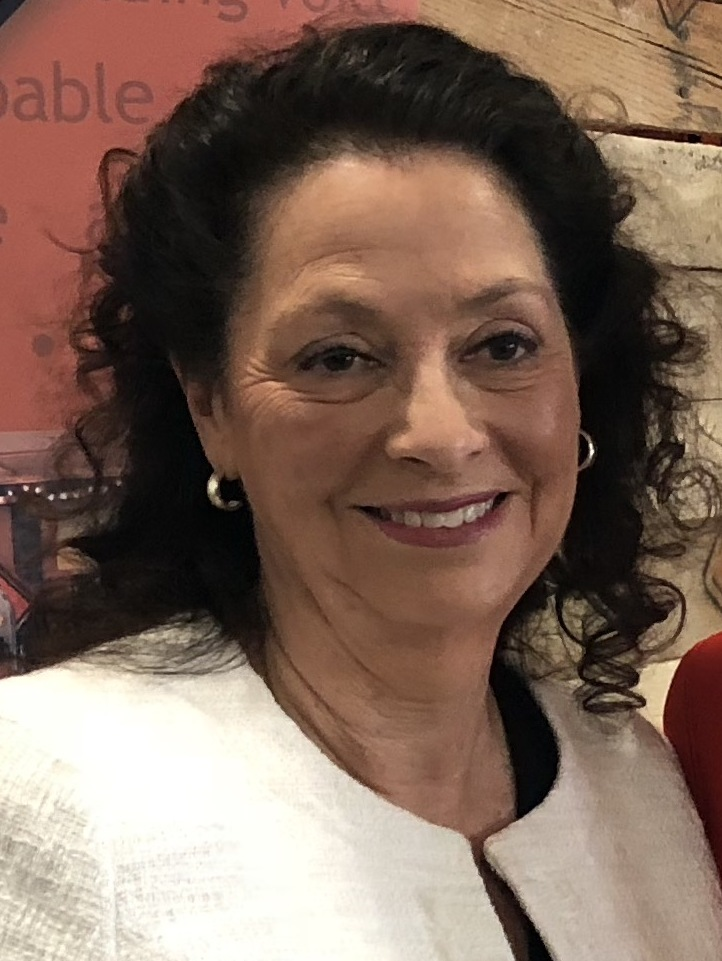
- Kelly in 2018

Member of the New Hampshire Senate from the 10th district
- In office December 6, 2006 – December 7, 2016
- Preceded by: Thomas R. Eaton
- Succeeded by: Jay Kahn

Personal details
- Born: September 15, 1949 (age 77) Fort Wayne, Indiana, U.S.
- Party: Democratic
- Education: Purdue University (attended); Keene State College (BA); University of New Hampshire (JD)

Molly Kelly is an American politician. A member of the Democratic Party, she served in the New Hampshire Senate, representing the 10th District from 2006 until 2016. She was the Democratic nominee for Governor of New Hampshire in the 2018 election.

== Early life and education ==
Kelly was raised in Fort Wayne, Indiana as one of 11 children. She later moved to Massachusetts, married and had three children, and then moved to Keene, New Hampshire, where she raised her children as a single mother and became a Keene State College student. While a student, she became the manager of the apartment complex where she resided with her children.

Kelly completed her bachelor's degree from Keene State College and a J.D. degree from the Franklin Pierce Law Center.

== State senate ==
Kelly was first elected to represent District 10 in the New Hampshire Senate in 2006 and was re-elected for five terms until she decided not to seek reelection in 2016. During her tenure, she was the chair of Governor's Advanced Manufacturing Education Advisory Council for eight years, served on the Education, Public & Municipal Affairs and Capital Budget committees, and was the vice chair of the Health and Human Services Committee. She also served on the Governor's Commission on Alcohol and Drug Abuse Prevention, Intervention, and Treatment.

Her district comprised Alstead, Chesterfield, Gilsum, Harrisville, Hinsdale, Keene, Marlborough, Nelson, Roxbury, Sullivan, Surry, Swanzey, Walpole, Westmoreland, and Winchester in Cheshire County.

== Campaign for Governor ==
Kelly ran for Governor of New Hampshire in the 2018 election. She won the Democratic nomination after defeating Steve Marchand in the primary, 66 percent to 34 percent, and then lost the general election to incumbent Republican Chris Sununu, 53 percent to 46 percent. Her campaign included a focus on education, health care, access to safe and legal abortion, renewable energy, protection of vulnerable children, and opposition to a sales and income tax.

Kelly was endorsed by Planned Parenthood, NEA-New Hampshire, AFT-New Hampshire, U.S. Senator Jeanne Shaheen, U.S. Senator Maggie Hassan, Congresswoman Annie Kuster, EMILY's List, and gun violence prevention activist Deb Howard.

Kelly was also endorsed by the Keene Sentinel editorial board, the most progressive editorial board in New Hampshire, citing "Kelly’s experience in how to get things done in Concord" and her "record of achievement." "Her record shows her to be a planner and to have the ability to gather support and follow through."

== Professional career ==
In addition to her career in the New Hampshire Senate, Kelly started and ran a small business as a retirement financial advisor, served as the director of Hospice of the Monadnock Region and was the director of the Franklin Pierce University Continuing Education program at its Keene campus.

She has also facilitated forums for the Center for Civic Engagement addressing challenges facing the community.

Kelly has served on the following boards and commissions: Cedarcrest Center for Children with Disabilities, Advisory Council; Southwest Community Services; Business and Education Coalition; New Hampshire Scholars (Chair 2014 -2016); New England Secondary School Consortium; Social Justice Foundation; Keene State College Civic Leadership Initiative; Education Commission of the States; NH Commission on the Status of Woman (Chair); Healthy New Hampshire Foundation (Treasurer); Greater Keene Chamber of Commerce; Keene Downtown Revitalization Corporation; International Rotary; and the Home Care Association of New Hampshire.

== Personal life ==
Kelly moved to Harrisville, New Hampshire in 2016. Kelly has four children and nine grandchildren.

Party political offices
Preceded by Colin Van Ostern	Democratic nominee for Governor of New Hampshire; 2018	Succeeded by Dan Feltes
