= New Hampshire's 10th State Senate district =

American legislative district

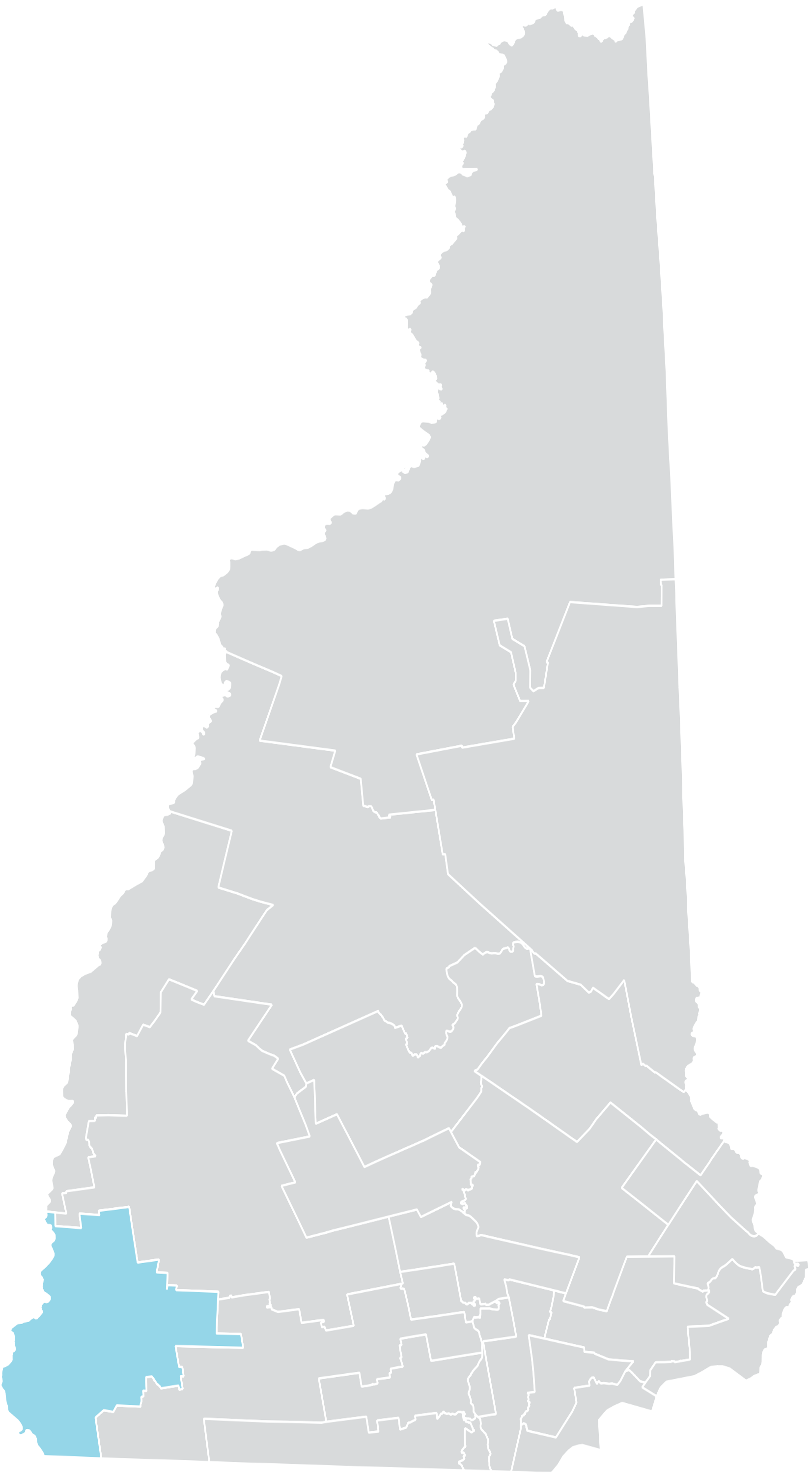
Senator
Donovan Fenton; D–Keene
- Registration: 35.0% Democratic; 20.8% Republican; 44.2% No party preference
- Demographics: 93.8% White; 0.9% Black; 1.7% Hispanic; 1.5% Asian
- Population (2019) • Citizens of voting age: 55,728; 45,491

New Hampshire's 10th State Senate district is one of 24 districts in the New Hampshire Senate. It has been represented by Democrat Donovan Fenton since 2022.

== Geography ==
District 10 currently comprises most municipalities in Cheshire County and a small portion of western Hillsborough. It includes Alstead, Chesterfield, Dublin, Harrisville, Keene, Marlborough, Nelson, Roxbury, Sullivan, Surry, Swanzey, Walpole and Westmoreland. Additionally, it includes nearby Hancock and Peterborough.

The district is located entirely within New Hampshire's 2nd congressional district. It borders the states of Massachusetts and Vermont.

== Recent election results ==
=== 2024 ===
2024 New Hampshire State Senate election, District 10
Party	Candidate	Votes	%
Democratic	Donovan Fenton (Incumbent)	20,841	63.12
Republican	Rick Merkt	12,166	36.85
Write-in		11	0.03
Total votes		33,018	100.0
Democratic hold			

=== 2022 ===
2022 New Hampshire State Senate election, District 10
Primary election
Party	Candidate	Votes	%
Democratic	Donovan Fenton	4,525	66.8
Democratic	Bobby Williams	2,250	33.2
Total votes		6,775	100
General election
Democratic	Donovan Fenton	17,305	66.1
Republican	Sly Karasinski	8,860	33.9
Total votes		26,165	100
Democratic hold			

Elections prior to 2022 were held under different district lines.

== Historical election results ==
=== 2020 ===
2020 New Hampshire State Senate election, District 10
Party	Candidate	Votes	%
Democratic	Jay Kahn (incumbent)	18,876	62.5
Republican	Dan LeClair	11,303	37.5
Total votes		30,179	100
Democratic hold			

=== 2018 ===
2018 New Hampshire State Senate election, District 10
Party	Candidate	Votes	%
Democratic	Jay Kahn (incumbent)	15,036	65.1
Republican	Dan LeClair	7,538	32.7
Libertarian	Ian Freeman	507	2.2
Total votes		23,081	100
Democratic hold			

=== 2016 ===
2016 New Hampshire State Senate election, District 10
Primary election
Party	Candidate	Votes	%
Democratic	Jay Kahn	2,706	64.2
Democratic	Kris Roberts	985	23.3
Democratic	Ben Tilton	527	12.5
Total votes		4,218	100
General election
Democratic	Jay Kahn	17,713	63.3
Republican	Chester Lapointe	10,273	36.7
Total votes		27,986	100
Democratic hold			

=== 2014 ===
2014 New Hampshire State Senate election, District 10
Party	Candidate	Votes	%
Democratic	Molly Kelly (incumbent)	14,034	100
Total votes		14,034	100
Democratic hold			

=== 2012 ===
2012 New Hampshire State Senate election, District 10
Party	Candidate	Votes	%
Democratic	Molly Kelly (incumbent)	18,810	66.5
Republican	Richard Foote	9,483	33.5
Total votes		28,293	100
Democratic hold			

=== Federal and statewide results ===
Year	Office	Results
2020	President	Biden 61.8 – 36.5%
2020	Senate	Shaheen 65.5 – 32.0%
2016	President	Clinton 57.2 – 37.6%
2014	Senate	Shaheen 64.4 – 35.6%
2014	Governor	Hassan 64.5 – 35.5%
2012	President	Obama 65.0 – 33.6%
2012	Governor	Hassan 66.5 – 30.5%
