= Xudong Huang =

Medical researcher

- Born: 1965 (age 60–61); Fuzhou, China
- Education: University of Science & Technology of China; Tufts University; Massachusetts Institute of Technology; Harvard Medical School
- Occupations: Professor and Researcher
- Employer(s): Massachusetts General Hospital; Harvard Medical School

Xudong Huang (born 1965) is a Chinese-American medical researcher and the current Co-Director of the Neurochemistry Lab of Psychiatry Department at the Massachusetts General Hospital. He is also an Associate Professor of Psychiatry at Harvard Medical School.

== Early life ==
In 1965, Dr. Huang was born in Fuzhou, China. He went on to attend the University of Science & Technology of China and graduated in 1987. Dr. Huang then attended Tufts University for his master's degree in chemistry. Finally, he earned a Ph.D. in nuclear science and engineering from Massachusetts Institute of Technology and did his postdoctoral work at Harvard Medical School and Massachusetts General Hospital.

== Career ==
Huang's research centers around finding cures for Alzheimer's disease and other brain diseases, cardiovascular diseases, and cancer, and using artificial intelligence in his drug discovery research. Dr. Huang has published more than 120 research papers, has 5 patents and has long been the Editor-in-Chief for the International Journal of Biomedical Nanoscience and Nanotechnology.
