= Jay Kahn =

Member of the New Hampshire Senate

Mayor of Keene, New Hampshire
- Incumbent
- Assumed office January 4, 2024
- Preceded by: George Hansel

Member of the New Hampshire Senate from the 10th district
- In office December 7, 2016 – December 7, 2022
- Preceded by: Molly Kelly
- Succeeded by: Donovan Fenton

Personal details
- Born: September 1950 (age 75) Chicago, Illinois, U.S.
- Party: Democratic
- Spouse: Cheryl
- Children: 2
- Education: Northern Illinois University (BA); University of Illinois at Springfield (MA); University of Illinois at Chicago (PhD)

Jay Kahn (born September 1950) is an American politician who served as a member of the New Hampshire Senate for the 10th district, in the southwestern corner of the state and including Alstead, Chesterfield, Gilsum, Harrisville, Hinsdale, Keene, Marlborough, Nelson, Roxbury, Sullivan, Surry, Swanzey, Walpole, Westmoreland and Winchester, New Hampshire. Kahn was elected Mayor of Keene, New Hampshire in 2023, receiving 91.4% of the vote. Kahn received 2625 of 2998 votes cast.

== Early life and education ==
Originally from Chicago, Illinois, Kahn earned a Bachelor of Arts degree from Northern Illinois University, a Master of Arts from the University of Illinois Springfield, and a PhD in political science and policy studies from the University of Illinois Chicago.

== Career ==
His 43-year career in higher education included roles at the Illinois Board of Higher Education and Governors State University in Illinois prior to becoming vice president for finance and planning at Keene State College. While at Keene State, he served as interim president and adjunct faculty in management and economics. Prior to his election to the New Hampshire Senate, he was a city councilor in Keene.

Kahn served on the Senate Education and Senate Judiciary committees and previously as chair of the Senate Education and Workforce Development Committee, on the Senate Finance committee. He chairs the NH Commission on Telehealth Services and the Commission on Holocaust and Genocide Education, and has served on many legislative committees including the Commission on School Funding. Legislative Youth Advisory Council, Special Education, Streamlining Mental Health and Human Services, Electricity Pricing, Grandparenting and Legislative Rules. He was also a representative to the Education Commission of the States and the National Conference of State Legislatures Student Centered Learning Committee, and served on the New England Board of Higher Education Legislative Committee.

He has been elected as a lifetime honorary member of the American Institute of Architects New Hampshire Chapter and a lifetime honorary member of the Keene State College Alumni Association.

Past professional and community service roles include: Society for College and University Planning, Board of Directors; and chairperson of National Association of College and University Business Officer, Comprehensive and Doctoral Institutions Council. He also served on the New England Commission on Higher Education. Locally, he has chaired the boards of the Greater Keene Chamber of Commerce, the Cheshire Medical Center, and the Monadnock Economic Development Corporation.

== Personal life ==
He and his wife Cheryl, with whom he has two children, live in Keene.

== See also ==
- List of mayors of Keene, New Hampshire
