= Trombly, Michigan =

- Unincorporated community
- Location within the state of Michigan
- Coordinates: 46°02′35″N 87°08′54″W
- Country: United States
- State: Michigan
- County: Delta
- Township: Maple Ridge
- Elevation: 968 ft (295 m)
- Time zone: UTC-5 (Eastern (EST))
  - Summer (DST): UTC-4 (EDT)
- ZIP code(s): 49880
- Area code: 906
- GNIS feature ID: 1617899

Trombly is an unincorporated community in Delta County, in the U.S. state of Michigan.

== History ==
Trombly was named for a local landowner.
