= Colin Van Ostern =

American businessman & politician

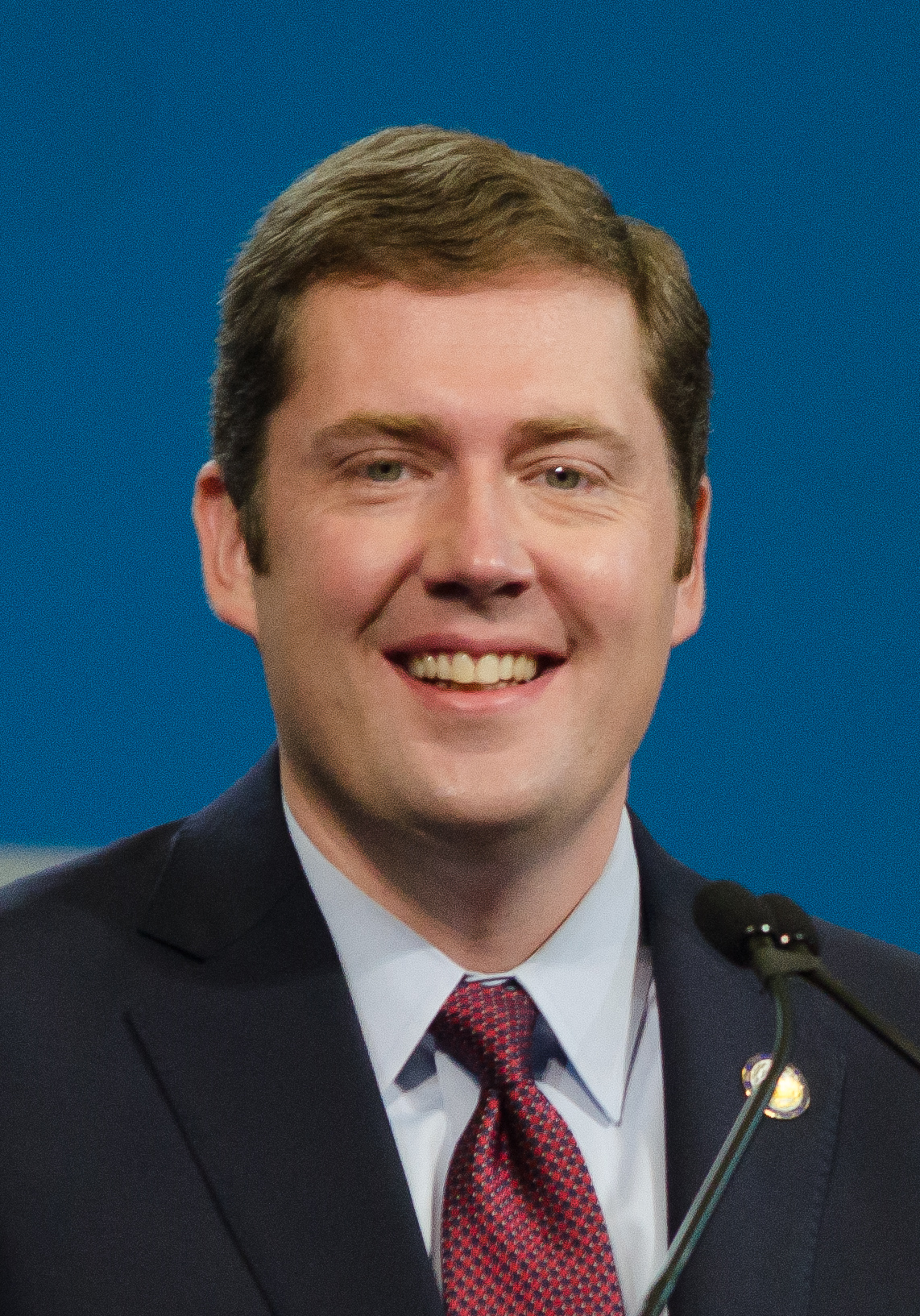

Member of the New Hampshire Executive Council from the 2nd district
- In office January 3, 2013 – January 3, 2017
- Preceded by: Daniel St. Hilaire
- Succeeded by: Andru Volinsky

Personal details
- Born: Kevin Colin O'Loughlin; February 14, 1979 (age 47) Carlsbad, California, US
- Party: Democratic
- Spouse: Kristyn McLeod
- Children: 2
- Education: George Washington University (BA); Dartmouth College (MBA)
- Website: Campaign website

Colin Van Ostern (born Kevin Colin O'Loughlin on February 14, 1979) is an American businessman and politician who served on the New Hampshire Executive Council from 2013 to 2017, where he represented the state's second district. He is a member of the Democratic Party, and was the Democratic nominee for Governor of New Hampshire in 2016. He was a candidate for a two-year term as New Hampshire Secretary of State in the New Hampshire General Court's 2018 election, which he lost to incumbent Bill Gardner. He ran in the 2024 Democratic primary to succeed Annie Kuster in New Hampshire's 2nd congressional district; he was defeated by Maggie Goodlander.

== Early life and education ==
Van Ostern was born in Carlsbad, California, on February 14, 1979, to a family of Irish ancestry. He moved repeatedly as a young child, arriving in New Hampshire in 2001 in his early twenties. He attended high school at Maggie Walker Governor's School for Government and International Studies in Richmond, Virginia, and college in Washington, D.C. at George Washington University, where he earned a Bachelor of Arts degree in 2000 in International Relations. He received a M.B.A. from the Tuck School of Business at Dartmouth College in Hanover, New Hampshire in 2009.

Van Ostern was born Kevin Colin O'Loughlin, but was always referred to by his middle name; during his childhood, he adopted the surname Van Ostern as a nod to his mother and stepfather's family. He changed his surname to Van Ostern O'Loughlin, though he was primarily known simply as Colin Van Ostern, which he shortened his legal name to when he began running for office.

== Professional career ==
Van Ostern formerly served as the president and chief operating officer of Alumni Ventures, a venture capital firm headquartered in Manchester, New Hampshire.

Previously, Van Ostern worked as vice president of Workforce Solutions at Southern New Hampshire University. He previously helped SNHU launch College for America, a nonprofit school focused on providing a college education to individuals within the work force interested in furthering their education. College for America works directly with students' employers to ensure that each student can gain their education while continuing their career, usually with little or no debt. Van Ostern joined the school shortly before its launch in 2013.

Previously, he was a business manager at Stonyfield, Inc., where he managed various brands and business lines for the world's largest organic yogurt maker.

In 2004, he founded a business-consulting firm called Washington Street Consulting. As the principal of his consulting firm, Van Ostern advised over 30 nonprofits and small businesses. He has also served as a senior advisor to various elected officials including U.S. Senator Jeanne Shaheen and Congresswoman Ann McLane Kuster, and before moving to New Hampshire in 2001.

== Political career ==
Van Ostern won a seat on the New Hampshire Executive Council in 2012, succeeding former Executive Councilor Daniel St. Hilaire. He was re-elected in 2014.

Van Ostern was the Democratic Party's nominee for Governor of New Hampshire in 2016, winning the primary election by a vote of 52 percent to Steve Marchand's 25% and Mark Connolly's 20 percent, and narrowly losing the general election by a vote of 47 percent to Chris Sununu's 49 percent.

=== Commuter rail ===
Van Ostern was first elected to the Executive Council after campaigning on the importance of building passenger rail from Boston to central New Hampshire. The New Hampshire Capitol Corridor rail project was halted by the Executive Council in 2011, but continued in 2013 after Van Ostern was elected. A study focused on the production of the rail system and funded by the state of New Hampshire was completed in 2015, finding that rail from Boston to Manchester would result in a projected 5,600 new permanent jobs and 3,630 additional construction jobs.

=== Healthcare and reproductive rights ===
Van Ostern has been a strong advocate for providing accessible healthcare options for all New Hampshire citizens. In 2014, he voted with a majority 3-2 on the Executive Council to enact the New Hampshire Health Protection Plan, which has since expanded Medicaid to over 40,000 New Hampshire citizens.

Van Ostern publicly opposed Republican members of the Executive Council when they voted against funding family planning services at New Hampshire's Planned Parenthood health centers in both 2011 and 2015, and in 2015 he was awarded the Champion of Choice award by NARAL Pro-Choice New Hampshire, the state's largest grassroots organization dedicated solely to reproductive rights.

=== Ending the 2014–2015 Fairpoint strike ===
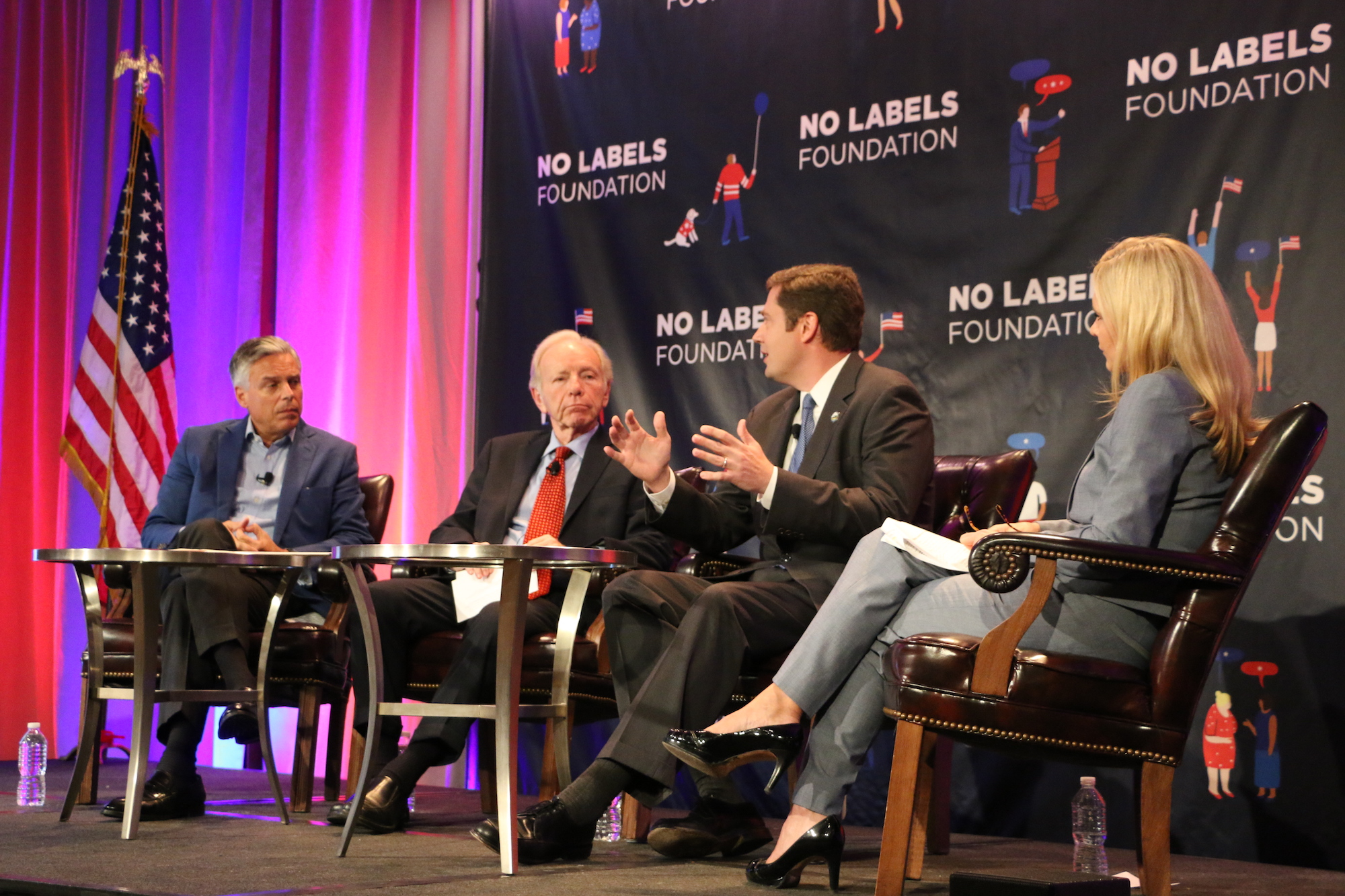
Van Ostern at a 2016 gubernatorial candidate forum steered by former Utah Governor Jon Huntsman Jr. and former Connecticut Senator Joe Lieberman.

In October 2014, 1,700 workers at Fairpoint Communications in New Hampshire, Maine, and Vermont went on strike after the company froze pensions, implemented pay reductions for new employees, and limited health care benefits. By late November, negotiations between the two sides had reached an impasse. On December 23, Van Ostern asked state officials to delay a proposed $13 million contract for state phone and data service with Fairpoint, citing the poor consumer service levels in the wake of the strike. Members of the striking labor union, IBEW, used the contract delay to call on the company to return to negotiations. Negotiations between the company and striking workers resumed on January 4, 2015 and the contract was passed unanimously on the Executive Council later that month. The strike was resolved in early February, and was the nation's largest and longest in 2014.

=== 2018 campaign for Secretary of State ===
In 2018, Van Ostern was a candidate for New Hampshire Secretary of State. The New Hampshire General Court selects the secretary of state, and Van Ostern's campaign against longtime incumbent Bill Gardner, a fellow Democrat who has supported some Republican election and voting proposals, was based in part on the Democratic Party gaining control of both the New Hampshire Senate and New Hampshire House of Representatives in the 2018 elections. Gardner won the December 5 legislative election, 209 votes to 205.

=== 2024 campaign for United States House of Representatives ===
On March 28, 2024, Van Ostern announced that he would run for New Hampshire's 2nd congressional district in the election that year to succeed retiring Representative Annie Kuster. He was eventually defeated in the Democratic Primary by Maggie Goodlander with 63.8% of the vote to Van Ostern's 36.2%.

== Personal life ==
Van Ostern and his wife, Kristyn, have two children.

Party political offices
Preceded by Maggie Hassan	Democratic nominee for Governor of New Hampshire; 2016	Succeeded by Molly Kelly
