= Beverly Hollingworth =

American politician

Beverly Hollingworth (born November 18, 1935) is an American politician and businesswoman.

Hollingworth was born in Hampton, New Hampshire, and studied at the Harvard Kennedy School at Harvard University. Hollingworth was involved in the hotel and restaurant business and worked in a hospital as a patient advocate. A Democrat, she served in the New Hampshire House of Representatives from 1980 to 1990 and in the New Hampshire Senate from 1990 to 1994 and from 1996 to 2002. Hollingworth served on the New Hampshire Executive Council from 2007 to 2011.
