= Steve Marchand =

American politician

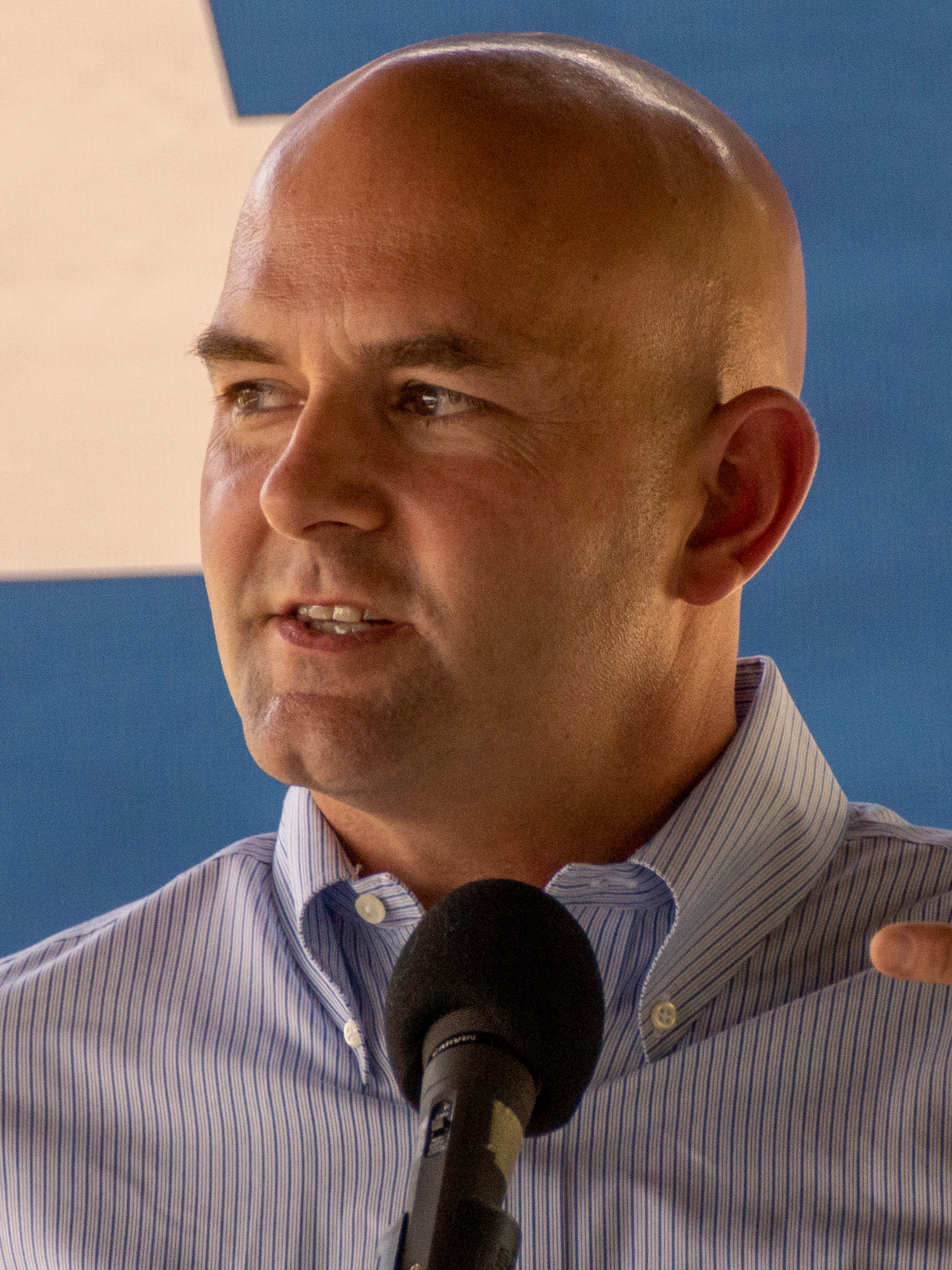
- Marchand in 2019

Mayor of Portsmouth
- In office January 9, 2006 – January 3, 2008
- Preceded by: Evelyn Sirrell
- Succeeded by: Thomas Ferrini

Personal details
- Born: January 10, 1974 (age 52) Manchester, New Hampshire, U.S.
- Party: Democratic
- Spouse: Sandi Hennequin
- Children: Abigail Marchand, Margaret Marchand
- Education: Syracuse University (BA/BS, MPA)

Steve Marchand (born January 10, 1974) is an American politician. He served as the mayor of Portsmouth, New Hampshire, from 2006 to 2008. He is the principal of SRM Consulting, public affairs and strategic communications firm. Prior to that, he served as the Director of Corporate Relations for the University of New Hampshire.

Marchand was an early Democratic primary candidate for U.S. Senate for the 2008 election, but he dropped out of the race in 2007 and endorsed former Governor Jeanne Shaheen. Marchand was also a Democratic primary candidate for Governor of New Hampshire in 2016 but was defeated by Colin Van Ostern.

On April 3, 2017, Marchand formally announced his 2018 candidacy for governor but later lost the Democratic primary to Molly Kelly.

== Public service ==
First elected in 2003 to the Portsmouth City Council, Marchand served on the City Council from 2004–2005 and was re-elected in 2005. He received the highest numbers of votes in the 2005 election, making him Mayor of Portsmouth.

== Political campaigns ==
In the 2016 election cycle, Marchand was a late entrant in the Democratic primary race for New Hampshire Governor. In a field of five candidates, he placed second with 25.3% of the vote.

== Controversy ==
During the 2021 Portsmouth, NH City Council race, Marchand was accused by the NH Attorney General's Office of being behind websites, fliers, and robotexts implicating five sitting members of the City Council as far-right Trump supporters. Marchand claimed to have acted alone in the scheme. Portsmouth Democrat Committee Chair Shanika Amarakoon and New Hampshire Democratic Party Chair Raymond Buckley condemned Marchand's tactics.

== See also ==
- List of mayors of Portsmouth, New Hampshire
