= Rick Trombly =

American politician

Member of New Hampshire Senate for District 7
- In office 1998–2000

Member of New Hampshire House of Representatives for Merrimack 4
- In office 1986–1998

Member of New Hampshire House of Representatives for Merrimack 10
- In office 1978–1984

Personal details
- Party: Democratic

Rick Trombly is an American politician. He was a member of the New Hampshire House of Representatives.

Trombly endorsed the Pete Buttigieg 2020 presidential campaign. He was executive director of the New Hampshire State Teachers Association.
