= Martha Fuller Clark =

American politician (born 1942)

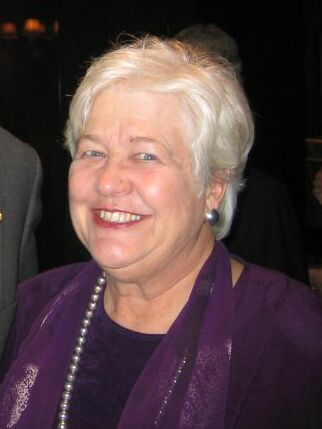
- Clark at the "100 Club" Dinner in 2006

President pro tempore of the New Hampshire Senate
- In office December 5, 2018 – December 2, 2020
- Preceded by: Sharon Carson
- Succeeded by: Sharon Carson

Member of the New Hampshire Senate from the 21st district
- In office December 2012 – December 2, 2020
- Preceded by: Amanda Merrill
- Succeeded by: Rebecca Perkins Kwoka

Member of the New Hampshire Senate from the 24th district
- In office December 2004 – December 2010
- Preceded by: Iris Estabrook
- Succeeded by: Nancy Stiles

Personal details
- Born: March 14, 1942 (age 84) York, Maine, U.S.
- Party: Democratic
- Spouse: Geoffrey Clark
- Children: 3
- Education: Mills College (BA); Boston University (MA)

Martha Fuller Clark (born March 14, 1942, in York, Maine) is a former Democratic member of the New Hampshire Senate, representing the 21st district from 2012 until 2020 and the 24th district from 2004 until 2010. Prior to her Senate service she was a member of the New Hampshire House of Representatives from 1990 through 2002.

She first ran for the United States Congress to represent New Hampshire's 1st congressional district in 2000 but was defeated by then incumbent representative John E. Sununu. She ran again in 2002, but lost to former Congressman Jeb Bradley. Today, Sen. Clark serves as Vice-Chair of the New Hampshire Democratic Party and a member of Democratic National Committee, serving on the Resolutions Committee. In 2008 and again in 2012 she was a co-chair of the New Hampshire Committee to elect Barack Obama President of the United States, a superdelegate to the 2008 Democratic National Convention in Denver, and was a member of the United States Electoral College in 2008, when she cast one of New Hampshire's four electoral votes for Barack Obama and Joe Biden.

Additionally she serves on a number of boards and commissions in her community. She recently retired as President of the Board of Strawbery Banke, and continues to serve as on the board. She is also an advisor to the National Trust for Historic Preservation, and is the past President of Scenic America.

Fuller Clark, daughter of environmental activist and former Maine legislator Marion Fuller Brown, earned a master's degree in art history from Boston University, and an undergraduate degree from Mills College. She was born and raised in York, Maine. Since 1973, she and her husband, Dr. Geoffrey Clark, have lived in the city of Portsmouth where they raised their three children, Caleb, Nathaniel, and Anna.

== 2010 election ==
On November 2, 2010, Republicans reclaimed control of both chambers of the state legislature. Clark was one of the casualties, losing her seat to Republican Nancy F. Stiles by a narrow 538-vote margin.

== 2012 election ==
On November 6, 2012, Clark was returned to the New Hampshire Senate from the newly-redrawn 21st District, which includes her hometown of Portsmouth. She won by over 11,000 votes.

New Hampshire Senate
Preceded by Sharon Carson	President pro tempore of the New Hampshire Senate; 2018–2020	Succeeded by Sharon Carson
