= Graham Colditz =

Australian epidemiologist (born 1954)

- Born: 1 November 1954 (age 71); Sydney, Australia
- Education: Newington College; University of Queensland; Harvard University
- Occupations: Niess-Gain Professor; Washington University in St. Louis; Associate Director; Alvin J. Siteman Cancer Center
- Spouse: Pat Cox
- Children: 1 son, 1 daughter

Graham Andrew Colditz MD, DrPH (born 1 November 1954) is an Australian chronic disease epidemiologist. He is the inaugural Niess-Gain Professor at Washington University School of Medicine, where he is associate director for Prevention and Control at the Alvin J. Siteman Cancer Center. He directs the Master of Population Health Science at Washington University School of Medicine. During medical training he was excited by the potential for prevention of chronic diseases. With encouragement from mentors he pursued training in the US as it was routine for academics in Australia to obtain overseas training at that time. He is internationally recognized for leadership in cancer prevention, and is often interviewed by media for input on this topic. With members of Cancer Prevention and Control at Siteman, he blogs on issues relating to cancer prevention and screening and has a monthly syndicated health column titled For Your Health. According to Google Scholar statistics, Colditz has a h-index of more than 300. Colditz was a member of the Institute of Medicine Committee to Review Adverse Effects of Vaccines but resigned, along with Ruby H. N. Nguyen, before it produced its seminal report. In 2024, Colditz co-founded Prognosia Inc. with Shu Jiang, with the goal of making their breast cancer prevention tool available to women and healthcare providers. The technology received Breakthrough Device Designation from the U.S. Food and Drug Administration (FDA) in June, 2025. And Prognosia was purchased by Lunit in September 2025

== Birth and education ==
Colditz was born in Australia and educated at Newington College (1967–72). He was active in cricket and rugby at Newington. He received his B.Sc. and medical degree from the University of Queensland, Australia, where he served as President of the Australian Medical Students Association in 1977. He obtained his M.P.H. and Doctorate in Public Health from Harvard T.H. Chan School of Public Health. Placing great importance on applying the scientific evidence amassed through research, Colditz has taken the lead on a number of large health communication projects, including the development of the long-running, popular health risk assessment, Your Disease Risk. At Siteman he leads efforts to promote cancer prevention in the community

- Dr.P.H, 1986, Harvard School of Public Health
- M.P.H, 1982, Harvard School of Public Health
- M.D, 1998, University of Queensland School of Medicine
- M.B., B.S., 1979, University of Queensland School of Medicine

== Awards and honors ==
- 1975 National Heart Foundation of Australia Scholarship
- 1976 National Heart Foundation of Australia Scholarship
- 1977 Asthma Foundation of Queensland Medical Scholarship
- 1977 Australian Medical Students' Association—Eli Lilly Research Fellowship
- 1981-82 Fulbright Postgraduate Student Award
- 1981-83 Frank Knox Memorial Fellowship, Harvard University
- 1991-96 American Cancer Society, Faculty Research Award
- 1997 Raine Visiting professor, Department of Public Health, University of Western Australia
- 1998 Visiting Scientist, Cancer Foundation of Western Australia
- 1999 Leonard S. Schuman Lecture, University of Michigan
- 2002 Rotan Lecture, MD Anderson Cancer Center
- 2003 AACR-DeWitt S. Goodman Memorial Lectureship
- 2004 American Society for Preventive Oncology, Distinguished Achievement Award
- 2005 Cassel Distinguished Lecturer, University of North Carolina, Chapel Hill, Lineberger Comprehensive Cancer Center
- 2006 Institute of Medicine, Member
- 2007 Academy of Science, St. Louis, Fellow
- 2008 Kaner Memorial Lecture, Norris Cotton Cancer Center, Dartmouth College
- 2009 Harvard School of Public Health, Alumni Award of Merit
- 2011 American Cancer Society Medal of Honor
- 2012 AACR- ACS award for excellence in cancer epidemiology and prevention
- 2014 American Society of Clinical Oncology-American Cancer Society Award
- 2014 Newington Medalist – International
- 2014 LessCancer.org National Cancer Prevention Day Ronald B. Herberman Speaker
- 2016 Highly Cited Researchers (h>100) according to their Google Scholar Citations public profiles. Rank 1. Graham Colditz. January 2016 edition 2016.1.1
- 2018 Daniel P. Schuster Award for Distinguished Work in Clinical and Translational Science, Washington University School of Medicine
- 2018 Fellow, American Association for the Advancement of Science
- 2020 Washington University School of Medicine Academy of Educators
- 2020 American College of Epidemiology's Lilienfeld Award
- 2021 AACR Distinguished Lectureship on the Science of Cancer Health Disparities
- 2021 Lifetime Membership of the Australasian Epidemiological Association
- 2022 The University of Queensland Alumnus of the Year
- 2026 Honorary degree in Science, School of Public Health, SUNY Buffalo
