= Katie Wheeler =

American politician (born 1940)

Member of the New Hampshire Senate from the 21st district
- In office December 4, 1996 – December 4, 2002
- Preceded by: Jeanne Shaheen
- Succeeded by: Iris Estabrook

Member of the New Hampshire House of Representatives
- In office December 1988 – December 1996

Personal details
- Born: February 8, 1940 (age 86) St. Louis, Missouri, U.S.
- Party: Democratic
- Spouse: Douglas Wheeler (m. 1965)
- Children: 2
- Education: Smith College; Washington University in St. Louis

Katherine Wheeler (born February 8, 1940) is an American politician who served as a member of the New Hampshire House of Representatives and later the New Hampshire Senate.

Wheeler was born and raised in St. Louis. She graduated from Smith College in 1961, and attained her master's degree from Washington University in St. Louis. She has lived in New Hampshire since 1965.

Wheeler was first elected to the New Hampshire House of Representatives in 1988. In 1996, she was elected to the New Hampshire Senate from the 21st district after Jeanne Shaheen, the seat's previous holder, was elected Governor of New Hampshire. Wheeler continued to serve in the New Hampshire Senate until her retirement in 2002.
