= New Hampshire's 15th State Senate district =

American legislative district

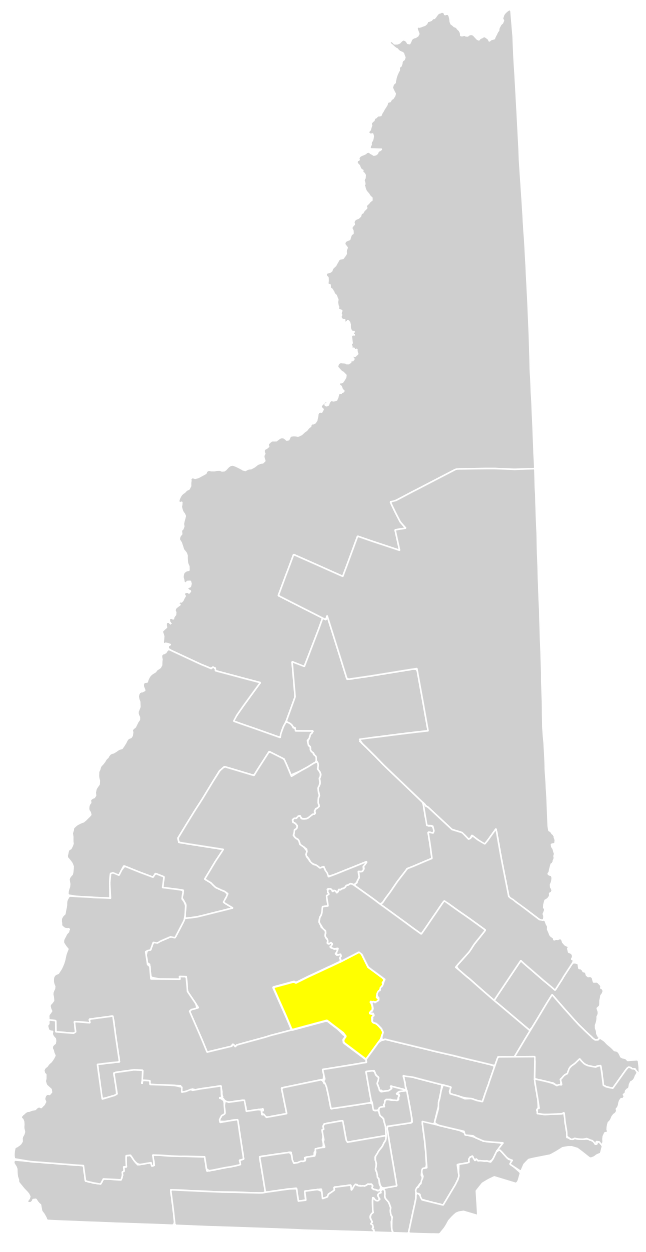
Senator
Tara Reardon; D–Concord
- Registration: 35.7% Democratic; 24.7% Republican; 39.5% No party preference
- Demographics: 85% White; 4% Black; 3% Hispanic; 4% Asian
- Population (2020): 58,119
- Notes: MHI: $89,309

New Hampshire's 15th State Senate district is one of 24 districts in the New Hampshire Senate. It has been represented by Democrat Tara Reardon since 2024, when fellow Democrat Rebecca Whitley retired.

== Geography ==
District 15 is based in the state capital of Concord, also covering the Merrimack County towns of Bow and Hopkinton

The district is located entirely within New Hampshire's 2nd congressional district.

=== Federal and statewide results ===
Results are of elections held under 2022 district lines.

Year	Office	Results
2022	Senate	Hassan 67 – 33%
2022	Governor	Sherman 54 - 46%

== Recent election results ==
=== 2024 ===
2024 New Hampshire State Senate election, District 15
Party	Candidate	Votes	%
Democratic	Tara Reardon	20,272	62.89
Republican	Pamela Ean	11,912	36.95
Write-in		53	0.16
Total votes		32,237	100.0
Democratic hold			

=== 2022 ===
2018 New Hampshire State Senate election, District 15
Party	Candidate	Votes	%
Democratic	Rebecca Whitley (incumbent)	16,625	64.7
Republican	Linda Rae Banfill	9,071	35.3
Total votes		25,696	100
Democratic hold			

== Historical election results ==
The following result occurred prior to 2022 redistricting, and thus were held under different district lines.

=== 2020 ===
2020 New Hampshire State Senate election, District 15
Primary election
Party	Candidate	Votes	%
Democratic	Becky Whitley	3,853	40.9
Democratic	Paul Hodes	3,129	33.2
Democratic	Candace Bouchard	2,422	25.7
Total votes		9,416	100
General election
Democratic	Becky Whitley	19,462	63.4
Republican	Linda Rae Banfill	11,243	36.6
Total votes		30,705	100
Democratic hold			

=== 2018 ===
2018 New Hampshire State Senate election, District 15
Party	Candidate	Votes	%
Democratic	Dan Feltes (incumbent)	15,929	66.2
Republican	Pamela Ean	8,119	33.8
Total votes		24,048	100
Democratic hold			

=== 2016 ===
2016 New Hampshire State Senate election, District 15
Party	Candidate	Votes	%
Democratic	Dan Feltes (incumbent)	17,658	61.8
Republican	Jeff Newman	10,913	38.2
Total votes		28,571	100
Democratic hold			

=== 2014 ===
2014 New Hampshire State Senate election, District 15
Primary election
Party	Candidate	Votes	%
Democratic	Dan Feltes	3,271	70.0
Democratic	Kass Ardinger	1,400	30.0
Total votes		4,671	100
General election
Democratic	Dan Feltes	13,352	65.1
Republican	Lydia Dube Harman	7,154	34.9
Total votes		20,506	100
Democratic hold			

=== 2012 ===
2012 New Hampshire State Senate election, District 15
Party	Candidate	Votes	%
Democratic	Sylvia Larsen (incumbent)	19,385	69.8
Republican	Lydia Dube Harman	8,382	30.2
Total votes		27,767	100
Democratic hold			

=== 2010 ===
2010 New Hampshire State Senate election, District 15
Party	Candidate	Votes	%
Democratic	Sylvia Larsen (incumbent)	12,069	61.7
Republican	Chris Wood	7,496	38.3
Total votes		19,565	100
Democratic hold			
