= Ronald B. Herberman =

American physician, immunologist, oncologist, and professor (1940–2013)

Ronald Bruce Herberman (February 26, 1940 – June 1, 2013) was an American physician, immunologist, oncologist, and professor of medicine and pathology who founded the University of Pittsburgh Cancer Institute (UPCI), a National Cancer Institute-designated Comprehensive Care Center in 1984. He helped discover natural killer cells capable of killing cancer. He became well known outside the medical community in 2008 for his public warning about the potential health impacts of mobile telephones and recommending a reduction in their use.

== Early life ==
Herberman was born in Brooklyn, New York, on February 26, 1940. He attended New York University, where he earned a BA in 1960 and MD in 1964.

== Immunology and cancer research ==
In 1968, prior to joining the University of Pittsburgh, Herberman was a senior investigator in the immunology branch of the National Cancer Institute, where he organized a research program related to tumor and cellular immunology.

In 1971, he became head of the cellular and tumor immunology section in the National Cancer Institute's Laboratory of Cell Biology. In this role he was responsible for a research program related to studies in animal model systems and in patients with cancer, studying the cell mediated immune responses to tumors. Herberman’s laboratory was at the forefront of research leading to the discovery of a new category of lymphocytes, termed natural killer (NK) cells. After that, much of Herberman's research focused on characterizing these natural effector cells and on their role in resisting cancer growth.

In 1975, Herberman was selected to become the chief of the National Cancer Institute’s Laboratory of Immunodiagnosis as part of the Institute’s intramural and extramural research program focused on immunodiagnosis of cancer. He also assumed responsibility for the national contract program on immunodiagnosis of cancer. Herberman was invited by the University of Pittsburgh to establish their Cancer Institute in 1984.

In 1988, he was appointed chairman of the Biological Response Modifiers Committee of the National Institute of Allergy and Infectious Diseases’ AIDS Clinical Trials Group and also served as a member of the NIAID AIDS Clinical Drug Development Committee.

Herberman authored over 700 publications in the medical literature and was editor of multiple journals, including Journal of Immunology, Journal of Immunotherapy, International Immunopharmacology, and Journal of Experimental Therapeutics and Oncology.

== Industry roles ==
Herberman served as Chief Medical Officer for Intrexon.At the time of his death, Herberman was chief medical officer and senior vice president for research and development for TNI Bio Tech Inc. in Bethesda, Md. He also served as chairman of the Environmental Health Trust, which examines environmental health risks and ways to reduce those risks. Herberman was a member of the Board of Directors of Celsense, Inc., a company he co-founded with Eric Ahrens, Paul Kornblith, Lans Taylor, Tom Petzinger, and Charlie O'Hanlon in 2005.

== Memberships and awards ==
Herberman won numerous awards for his contributions to medicine, including the Governor of Pennsylvania’s Award for Excellence in Science and Medicine, the Lifetime Science Award from the Institute for Advanced Studies in Immunology and Aging, the Award Excellence in Biomedical Research, and the Solomon A. Berson Medical Alumni Achievement Award in Clinical Science from New York University.

Herberman served on the board of directors of the American Association for Cancer Research. He has also served as interim chairman of the National Surgical Adjuvant Breast and Bowel Project (NSABP) from 1994 to 1995, president of the American Association of Cancer Institutes, and president of the Society for Biological Therapy and the Society for Natural Immunity. He was the first recipient of an endowed chair in oncology from the Hillman Foundation. He was a member, president, strategic plan committee member, and executive council member of the Society for Immunotherapy of Cancer (SITC).

== Opinions on mobile telephones ==
Herberman was prominent in expressing concerns about the long-term health effects of mobile telephony. On July 21, Herberman issued a memo to UPCI personnel titled “Important Precautionary Advice Regarding Cell Phone Use,” which began:

“Recently I have become aware of the growing body of literature linking long-term cell phone use to possible adverse health effects including cancer. Although the evidence is still controversial, I am convinced that there are sufficient data to warrant issuing an advisory to share some precautionary advice on cell phone use.”

The memo included ten specific recommendations for reducing exposure to mobile phones’ microwave radiation, including only allowing children to use them in emergencies, keeping the phone away from the body as much as possible, and keeping use time to a minimum.

On September 25, 2008, Herberman appeared before the U.S. House of Representatives Subcommittee on Domestic Policy as part of a hearing on the prolonged use of cell phones. During his testimony, he said, “I cannot tell this committee that cell phones are dangerous, but I certainly can't tell you they are safe…We urgently need to do a study [to resolve this question].” He also urged

In a 2010 Washington Post interview, Herberman expressed his concerns about mobile phones: “The evidence is not definitive, but I believe there is sufficient basis for concern about possible risk for cancer, especially for children and for long term (more than 10 years), heavy users.” Regarding hands-free Bluetooth technologies, Herberman stated that,

“It seems very likely that bluetooth headsets reduce exposure to radiofrequency radiation, since instead of the full strength of the radiation coming from the cell phone tower to the antenna on your phone, there is only much shorter distance radiation from the phone to the headset. However, bluetooth headsets can still carry health risks if one wears the headset, turned on, all day, since the lower level of such radiation is cumulative.”

As precautionary measures to reduce the risk of cancer, he recommended:

“Avoid holding the phone directly against your ear, especially during a long conversation. Rather: use speaker mode or wear a wired earpiece; or text since that keeps the phone in your hand and away from your ear. Also, please note that it is not good to keep the cell phone, when turned on, in your pocket or anywhere else in direct contact with your body. Cell phones continuously receive and emit radiofrequency radiation, and long term exposure against your body can contribute to health risks.” In the same Post story, he also stated that “I believe strongly that we need to utilize the principle of simple precautions until evidence one way or the other becomes definitive.”

== Philanthropy ==
Herberman was chairman of the board of Environmental Health Trust a nonprofit organization established by Herberman, David Servan-Schreiber, M.D., PhD and Devra Lee Davis, PhD, who is also professor of epidemiology and director of The Center for Environmental Oncology of the University of Pittsburgh Cancer Institute. Herberman also served as a member of the Board of Directors member of LessCancer.org, an organization formed by the Next Generation Choices Foundation dedicated to eliminating cancer through lifestyle changes. LessCancer founded the Ronald B. Heberman Speaker Series to discuss cancer prevention issues with members of Congress, in his honor. The first Herberman Speaker was Graham Colditz, MD.

== Personal ==
Herberman was married in 1963 and had two children, Holly and Steve.
