= Senator Merrill =

Senator Merrill may refer to:

- Amanda Merrill (born 1951), New Hampshire State Senate
- George F. Merrill (1847–1941), Wisconsin State Senate
- Henry Merrill (1804–1874), Wisconsin State Senate
- Moody Merrill (1836–1903), Massachusetts State Senate
- Orsamus Cook Merrill (1775–1865), Vermont State Senate
