= Becky Whitley =

New Hampshire politician

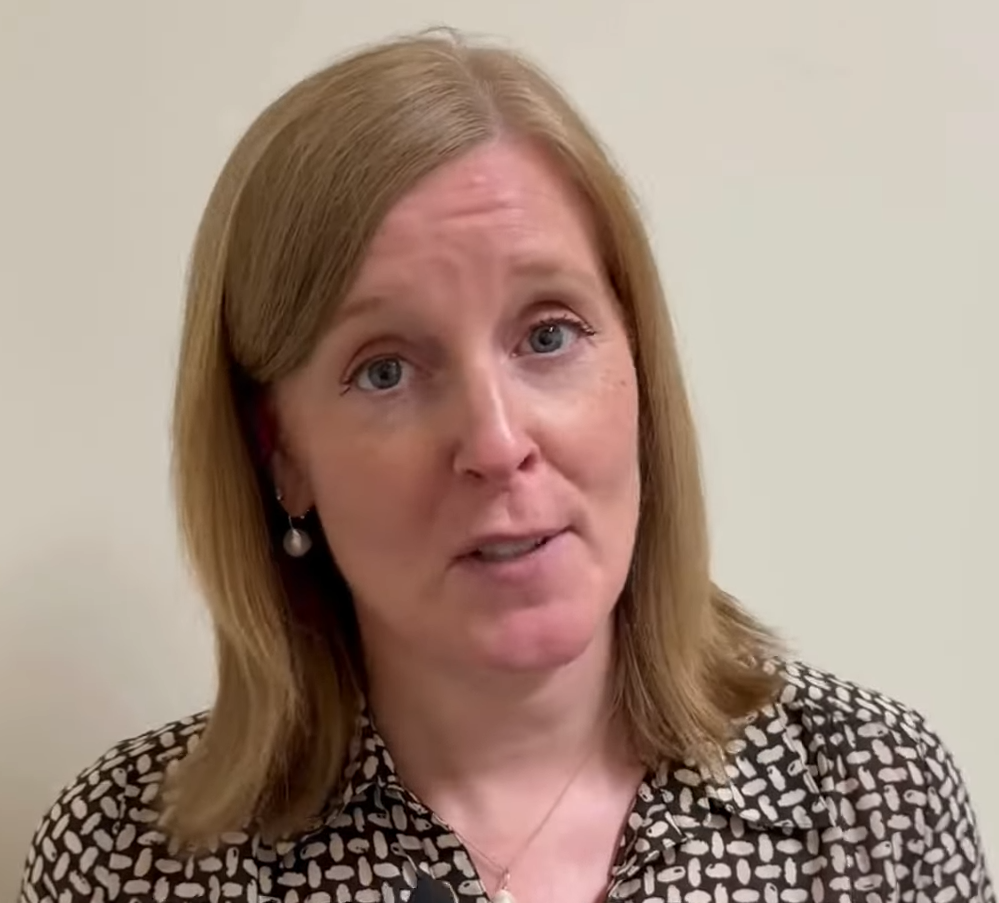
- Whitley in 2024

Member of the New Hampshire Senate from the 15th district
- In office December 2, 2020 – December 4, 2024
- Preceded by: Dan Feltes
- Succeeded by: Tara Reardon

Personal details
- Born: March 18, 1980 (age 46)
- Party: Democratic
- Education: George Washington University (BBA); Vermont Law School (JD)
- Website: State Senate website Campaign website

Rebecca Whitley (born March 18, 1980) is an American politician who served in the New Hampshire Senate from the 15th district from 2020 through 2024. A Democrat, she represented the state capital, Concord, as well as Hopkinton, Penacook, and Bow.

Before serving as a senator, Whitley worked as an attorney for the New Hampshire Disability Rights Center, a consultant for the Environmental Defense Fund, and the Policy Director for the Children's Behavioral Health Collaborative. She resides in Hopkinton with her husband and son.

== New Hampshire Senate ==
Following Senate Majority Leader Dan Feltes' retirement to run for governor, Whitley, who had never run for office before, and former congressman Paul Hodes sought the Democratic nomination for his seat. In the September 8th primary, Whitley won the nomination. She went on to win the general election.

During her 4 years in the New Hampshire Senate, Whitley was a member of the Senate Judiciary and Health and Human Services Committees and the Joint Legislative Committee on Administrative Rules. She was also a member of the Bipartisan Housing Caucus and a founding member and Co-Chair of the NH MomsCaucus. In the New Hampshire Senate, Whitley led in a bipartisan way to address NH's childcare crisis, help new moms get the healthcare and support they need, tackle food insecurity, reform NH's mental health system, protective reproductive freedom, and make modest criminal justice reforms. She secured key investments and critical policy change during the 2023 legislative session to mitigate and improve the early care and education crisis in NH and led the successful policy and advocacy campaign resulting in the passage of the "NH MOMnibus", a comprehensive legislative package to improve maternal and infant health outcomes, expand access to coverage and care, address maternal health inequities, and increase access to a broader array of services and providers for NH families.

During her time in the Senate, Whitley was named 2021 Legislator of the Year Award by the NH Council on Developmental Disabilities; 2023 Advocate of the Year Award by the NH Food Access Coalition; 2023 Legislator of the Year Award by National Alliance on Mental Illness (NAMI) NH; 2023 Legislator of the Year Award by New Futures; 2024 Legislator Advocate of the Year Award by the NH Food Access Coalition; and received a 2024 Recognition from the NH Breastfeeding Task Force for advocacy on behalf of NH mothers.

Whitley contemplated a run for Congress after Congresswoman Annie Kuster retired in 2024, but decided not to run, citing the outsized role of money and insider connections in politics.

== Electoral history ==
2020 New Hampshire State Senate election, District 15
Primary election
Party	Candidate	Votes	%
Democratic	Becky Whitley	3,853	40.9
Democratic	Paul Hodes	3,129	33.2
Democratic	Candace Bouchard	2,422	25.7
Total votes		9,416	100
General election
Democratic	Becky Whitley	19,462	63.4
Republican	Linda Rae Banfill	11,243	36.6
Total votes		30,705	100
Democratic hold			
