= Paul Hodes =

American politician (born 1951)

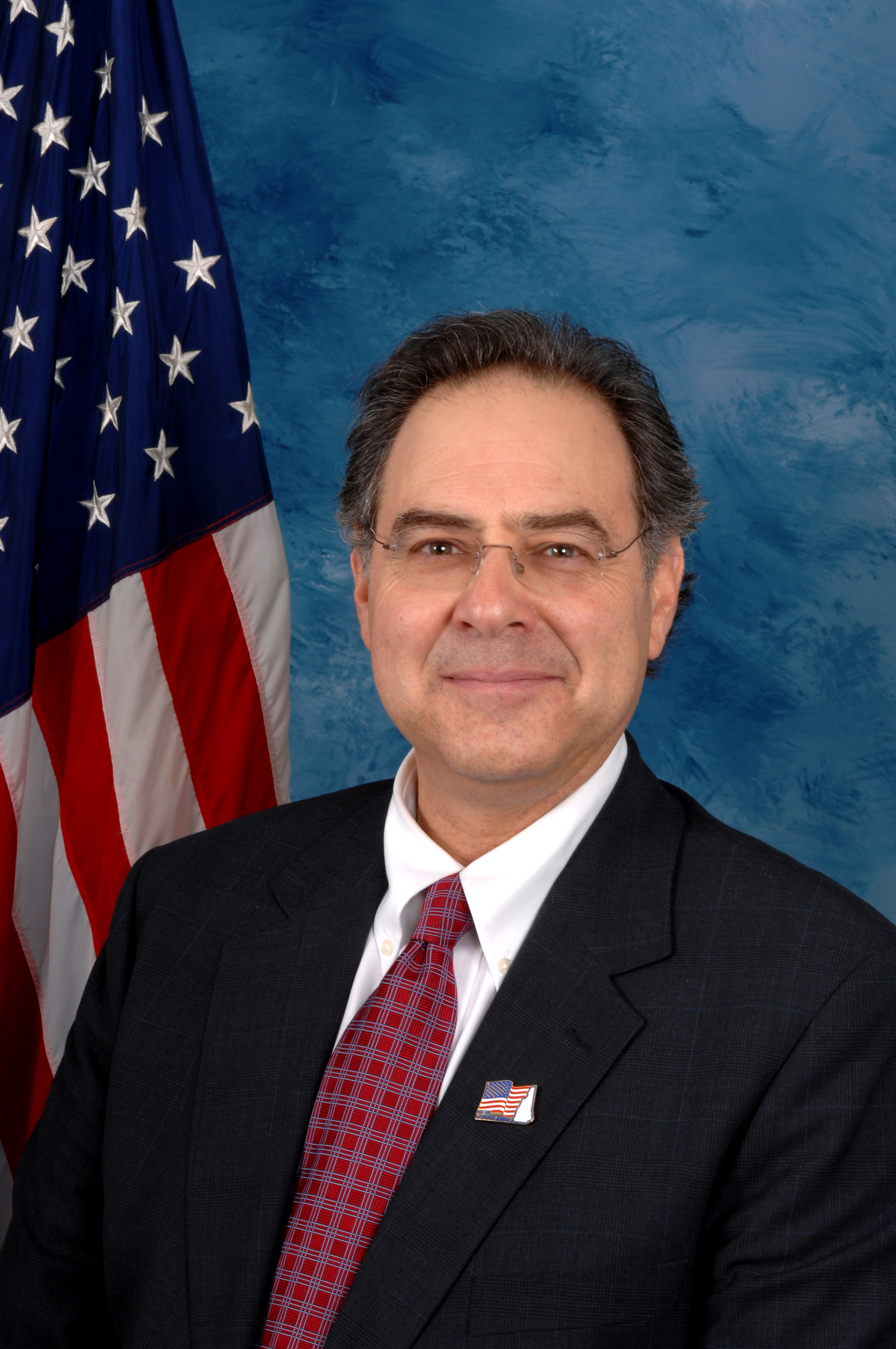
- Official portrait, 2007

Member of the U.S. House of Representatives from New Hampshire's 2nd district
- In office January 3, 2007 – January 3, 2011
- Preceded by: Charles Bass
- Succeeded by: Charles Bass

Personal details
- Born: Paul William Hodes; March 21, 1951 (age 75) New York City, New York, U.S.
- Party: Democratic
- Spouse: Peggo Horstmann
- Children: 2
- Education: Dartmouth College (BA); Boston College (JD)
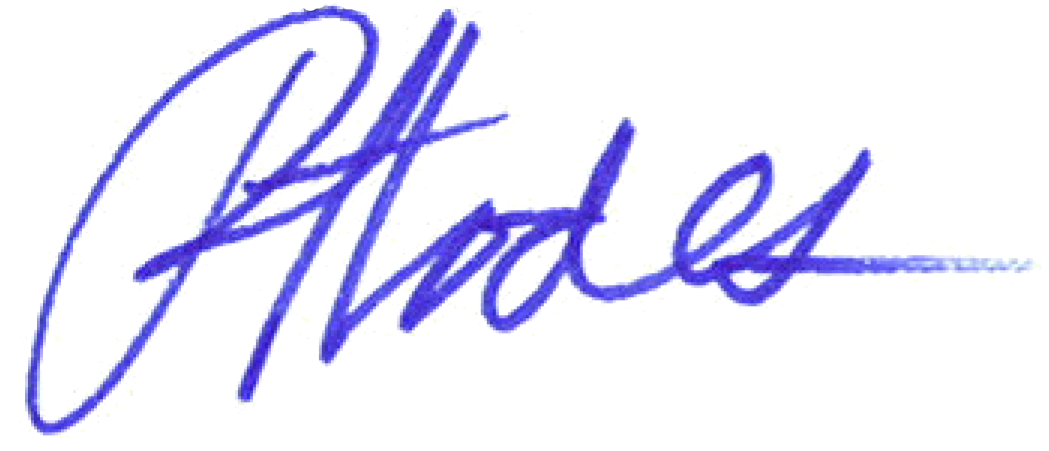
- Signature

Paul William Hodes (born March 21, 1951) is an American lawyer, musician, and former U.S. representative for New Hampshire's 2nd congressional district, serving from 2007 to 2011. He is a member of the Democratic Party, and was New Hampshire's first Jewish representative.

Hodes was an unsuccessful candidate for the Senate seat being vacated by Judd Gregg in 2010, losing to former New Hampshire Attorney General Kelly Ayotte. He was succeeded in the House of Representatives by Charles Bass.

After leaving Congress, Hodes was named as a board member of the Public Advisory Board of the New Hampshire Institute of Politics at Saint Anselm College. Hodes served on the boards of ADL, New England and the NJDC (National Jewish Democratic Council). In 2012, Hodes was nominated by President Barack Obama and confirmed by the US Senate to a position on the National Council on the Arts. He has subsequently worked as a green energy consultant with Shanti Energy, LLC and became Of Counsel at the law firm of Shaheen & Gordon, P.A. He also hosts radio programs on WKXL.

== Early life, education and career ==
Hodes was born in New York City in 1951, the son of Florence R. (née Rosenberg) and Robert Bernard Hodes. His ancestors were Jewish immigrants from Russia, Poland, and Austria. Hodes graduated from The Collegiate School in 1968 and from Dartmouth College in 1972. At Dartmouth, Hodes majored in French and Theater. In the fall of 1971, Hodes spent a semester studying theater at the National Theater Institute at the Eugene O'Neill Theater Center in Waterford, CT. In 1978, Hodes graduated from Boston College Law School.

== Arts and entertainment career ==
Hodes began playing guitar at age 15. Throughout his adult life, he has been both a performer and active member of the arts and entertainment communities. After graduating from Dartmouth College, Hodes spent three years acting, writing, and working on radio shows. While in law school, he acted in the Boston Arts Group . In the 1990s, Hodes was instrumental in the creation of the Capitol Center for the Arts in Concord, serving as its first Chairman of the Board. He previously served on the New Hampshire State Council on the Arts. In 2012, President Obama appointed Hodes to the National Council for the Arts which advises the chair of the National Endowment for the Arts. Hodes continues to serve as a National Councilor on the Arts, having served through four administrations. In addition to re-invigorating his performing career, Hodes now publishes, consults,and advises musical acts through Big Round Music, LLC.

Hodes's wife Peggo is a singer, voice teacher, and choral conductor with whom Hodes has recorded and performed as "Peggosus" and later, as "Peggo and Paul" The couple won the 1996 Parent's Choice Honors Award for their album "Patchwork Quilt" and performed at the White House. Today, they often perform as "The Family Hodes" with their singer-songwriter daughter, Ariana Hodes. Their music can be found on all digital platforms.

== Law career ==
Hodes worked as an attorney with the New Hampshire Department of Justice from 1978 until 1980. He was an Assistant Attorney General from 1980 until 1982, when he left to serve as a special prosecutor for the State in a significant white collar criminal case. From 1983 until 2006 he was in private practice. He is now of Counsel to the New England lawfirm of Shaheen & Gordon, P.A.

== U.S. House of Representatives ==
=== Committee assignments ===
- Committee on Financial Services
  - Subcommittee on Capital Markets, Insurance, and Government Sponsored Enterprises
  - Subcommittee on Financial Institutions and Consumer Credit
- Committee on Oversight and Government Reform
  - Subcommittee on Government Management, Organization, and Procurement
  - Subcommittee on National Security and Foreign Affairs

=== Other membership and leadership positions ===
- American-Canadian Inter-Parliamentary Working Group
- President of the Congressional Freshman Class of 2006
- Board Member, Capitol Center for the Arts, 1990–1996, 2002–2004
- Board Member, New Hampshire State Council on the Arts, 1998–2004
- Board Member, New Hampshire Children's Alliance, 1998–2000
- Board Chair, Capitol Center for the Arts, 1990–1996
- Board President, The Dance Hall, Kittery 2016-2023
- Board Member, The Dance Hall, Kittery, 2023-present

== Political positions ==
In September 2008, Hodes voted against the Emergency Economic Stabilization Act of 2008, also known as "the financial bailout bill", which enacted the Troubled Asset Relief Program ("TARP").

He voted for the American Clean Energy and Security Act (commonly referred to as "cap and trade"), as well as the Patient Protection and Affordable Care Act.

Hodes was one of the first Democrats to demand that Representative Charlie Rangel surrender his Ways and Means chairmanship in the wake of the Ethics Committee finding that he violated House rules.

== Political campaigns ==
=== 2004 U.S. House campaign ===
Hodes ran unsuccessfully as a Democrat for United States House of Representatives in 2004 against incumbent Charles Bass in New Hampshire's 2nd congressional district.

=== 2006 U.S. House campaign ===
In a rematch held on November 7, 2006, Hodes defeated Bass 53% to 46%.

=== 2008 U.S. House campaign ===
In 2008, Hodes was re-elected winning with approximately 56% of the vote.

Hodes endorsed Barack Obama in the 2008 New Hampshire Democratic presidential primary.

=== 2010 U.S. Senate campaign ===
Hodes was chosen as the Democratic nominee for the United States Senate seat held by outgoing Republican senator Judd Gregg, who did not seek re-election. Hodes was defeated by Republican nominee Kelly Ayotte, the former New Hampshire Attorney General. 60% to 37%.

=== 2020 New Hampshire Senate campaign ===
Hodes ran as a Democrat for the New Hampshire Senate from the 15th district, but lost in the primary to Becky Whitley.

== Post-electoral career ==
On February 16, 2019, Hodes joined the presidential campaign of Democratic candidate Marianne Williamson as a senior campaign advisor and New Hampshire state director.

== Electoral history ==
Year	Office	Election	Subject	Party	Votes	%	Opponent	Party	Votes	%	Opponent	Party	Votes	%
2004	Congress, District 2	General	Paul Hodes	Democratic	125,280	38.17	Charles Bass	Republican	191,188	58.25	Richard Kahn	Libertarian	11,311	3.45
2006	Congress, District 2	General	Paul Hodes	Democratic	108,634	52.71	Charles Bass	Republican	94,012	45.61	Ken Blevens	Libertarian	3,305	1.60
2008	Congress, District 2	General	Paul Hodes	Democratic	188,332	56.4	Jennifer Horn	Republican	138,223	41.4	Chester LaPointe	Libertarian	7,121	2.1
2010	U.S. Senate	General	Paul Hodes	Democratic	166,538	36.7	Kelly Ayotte	Republican	272,703	60.1	Chris Booth	Independent	9,285	2.1

== Personal life ==
Hodes and his wife Peggo live in Kittery Point, Maine. They have two children, Max and Ariana.

== See also ==
- List of Jewish members of the United States Congress

U.S. House of Representatives
Preceded by Charlie Bass	Member of the U.S. House of Representatives from New Hampshire's 2nd congressional district 2007–2011	Succeeded by Charlie Bass
Party political offices
Preceded by Doris Haddock	Democratic nominee for U.S. Senator from New Hampshire (Class 3); 2010	Succeeded by Maggie Hassan
U.S. order of precedence (ceremonial)
Preceded by Jeb Bradley as Former U.S. Representative	Order of precedence of the United States as Former U.S. Representative	Succeeded by Frank Guinta as Former U.S. Representative
