= Shu Jiang =

Canadian biostatistician

Shu Jiang, also known as Joy Jiang, is a Canadian biostatistician and tenured associate professor in the Division of Public Health Sciences at the Washington University School of Medicine in St. Louis. In August 2026, the University of Toronto announced that Jiang will serve as the Eddie Goldenberg Research Chair of Canada in 2027. She co-founded Prognosia Inc. with Graham Colditz, a technology company that develops AI models that assess digital mammograms to accurately predict the risk of breast cancer. Prognosia's first tool, Prognosia Breast, earned Breakthrough Device Designation from the U.S. Food and Drug Administration (FDA) in June 2025, and the company was acquired by Lunit in September 2025.

Jiang is known for her methodological contributions to breast cancer risk prediction using high-dimensional mammogram images. In April 2023, The New York Times and CNN interviewed Jiang for a feature about breast density and cancer risk, in which she discussed recent findings on how changes in density over time may indicate elevated breast cancer risk. In December 2024, U.S. News & World Report cited Jiang in an article about artificial intelligence and breast cancer screening. Discussing her team's work on longitudinal mammogram analysis, Jiang said: "Our new method is able to detect subtle changes over time in repeated mammogram images that are not visible to the eye." More recently, media coverage has also included BreastCancer.org, which described a newer AI-based approach in which Jiang used multiple years of mammograms to enhance risk prediction.

She is an associate editor for the journal Biometrics and a statistical reviewer for JAMA Network Open. Among other awards and honors, Jiang has been named a Forbes 30 Under 30 in Healthcare in 2023 and received the MERIT award from the National Cancer Institute (2021-2027).

== Education ==
Jiang received a B.Sc. in statistics from Simon Fraser University (2012-2015), an M.Sc. in statistics from Western University (2015-2016), and a Ph.D. in statistics from University of Waterloo (2016-2018), where her supervisor was Richard Cook. From 2018-2019, she trained as a postdoctoral fellow in biostatistics at the Harvard T.H. Chan School of Public Health, where her supervisor was Rebecca Betensky.

== Awards and honors ==
Year	Award	Received from	Ref.
2019	Institute of Clinical and Translational Science Award	WashU Medicine	
2021	NIH MERIT Award	National Cancer Institute	
2022	40 Under 40 Public Health Catalyst Award	Boston Congress of Public Health	
2022	Young Alumni Achievement Medal	University of Waterloo	
2023	GAP Fund Award	WashU Medicine	
2023	Women in STEM (digital tools)	Equalize	
2023	Forbes 30 under 30	Forbes (North America)	
2023	NAM Emerging Leaders Forum	National Academy of Medicine	
2026	Chancellor’s Award for Innovation and Entrepreneurship	Washington University in St. Louis	
2026	Annie T. Randall Innovator Award	American Statistical Association	
