= Capitol Center for the Arts =

Performing arts center in New Hampshire, United States

Coordinates: 43°12′04″N 71°32′06″W

- Capital Theatre (1927-89)
- Logo prior to 2022

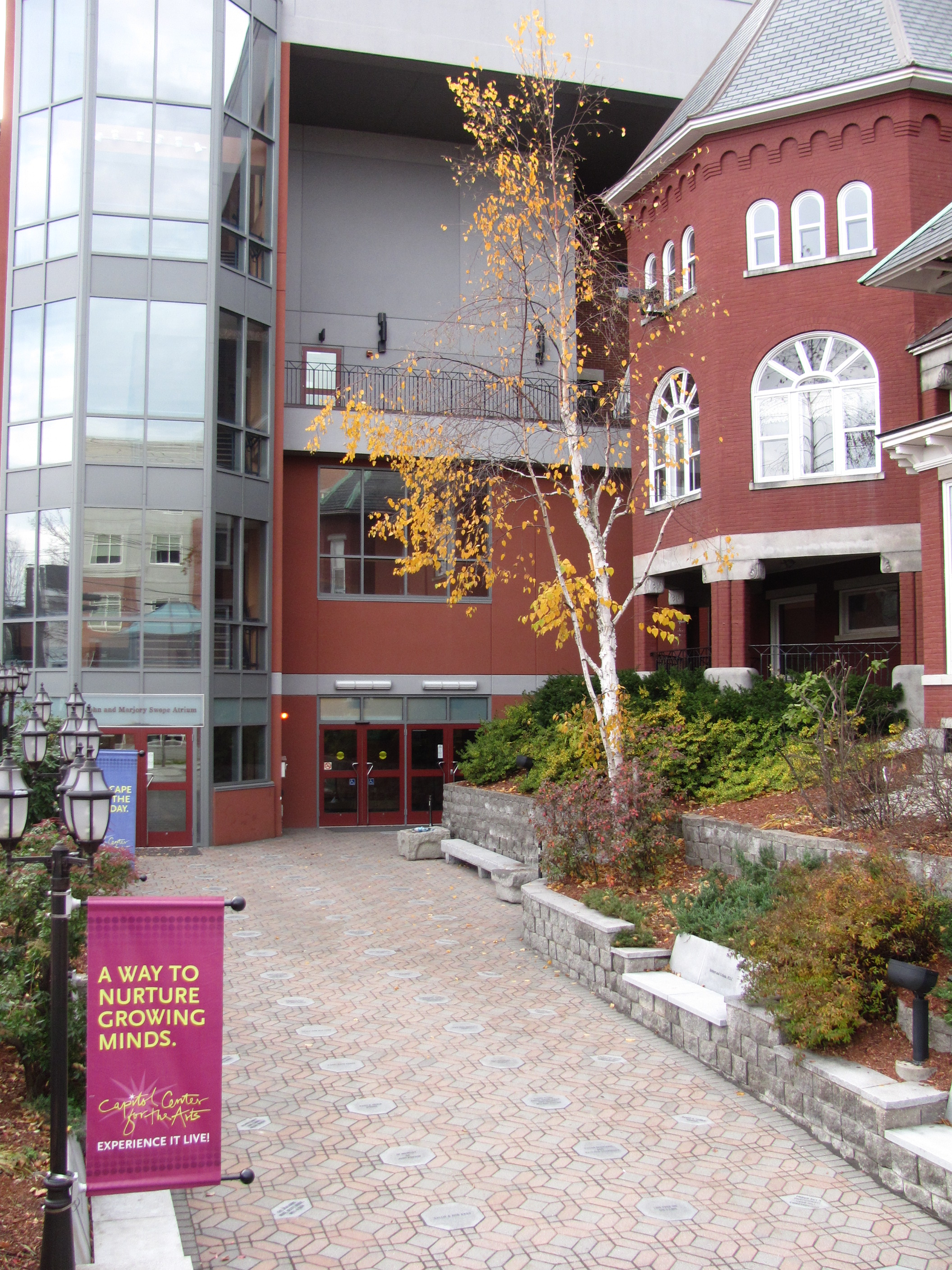
- Interactive map of Capitol Center for the Arts
- Address: 44 South Main St. Concord, New Hampshire
- Capacity: 1,304 (John F. Swope Theater); 424 (BNH Stage); 422 (Governor's Hall); 125 (Kimball House)
- Type: Performing arts center

Construction
- Opened: 1927
- Reopened: November 1995

Website
- ccanh.com

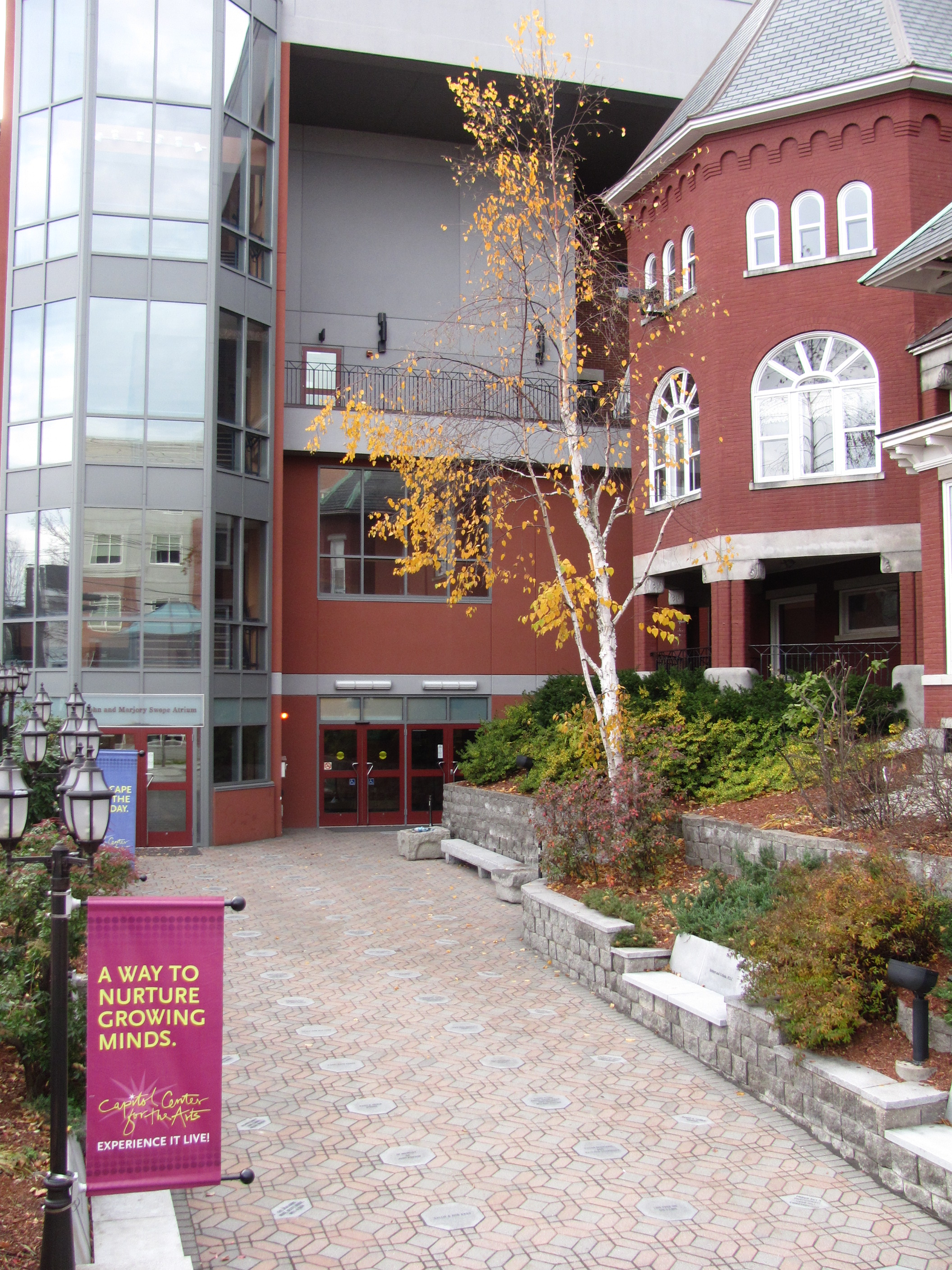

The Capitol Center for the Arts is an entertainment venue in Concord, New Hampshire, United States, which features a 1,304-seat theatre designed with an Egyptian motif. The center opened in its current form in 1995 after a multiyear renovation of the Capitol Theatre, which had existed in the same location from 1927 to 1989. The theatre is equipped to host major Broadway shows, and has played host to the Billy Joel musical Movin' Out, pianist George Winston, and humorist David Sedaris.

== History ==
The Capitol Theatre, as well as the Star Theatre around the corner, were part of a chain owned by Joseph P. Kennedy's Maine-New Hampshire Theatres Co.

In a piece written in 2011, remembering back to the 1950s and 1960s, Paul E. Brogan wrote that "the Capitol Theatre still bore signs of the elegance and lushness that had earned it acclaim when it opened, replete with a pipe organ and stage presentations before the film."

=== Renovation ===
The renovation of the Capitol Center for the Arts was made possible by $4.2 million in donations received for the then-newly formed center, with Chubb Life providing the majority of the support. The Chubb Theatre was named in honor of the company that made the center possible. Volunteers, some 250 of them, also contributed 3,000 hours of service to repaint the interior and restore the Egyptian motif. Paul Hodes, who subsequently became a congressman from New Hampshire, was also instrumental in the renovation and reopening of the center, heading up the effort at the urging of fellow lawyer and patron of the arts Martin L. Gross of Concord.

In 2019, the Capitol Center for the Arts opened a new venue, the BNH Stage at 16 S Main Street in Concord.

In September 2026, the Capitol Center for the Arts primary venue, the Chubb Theatre at 44 S Main Street, was renamed the John F. Swope Theater in honor of John F. Swope, who contributed decades of generous support to the CCA.
