= Iris Estabrook =

American politician

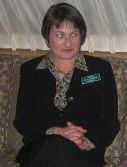
- Estabrook in 2006

Member of the New Hampshire Senate from the 21st district
- In office December 4, 2002 – December 1, 2008
- Preceded by: Katie Wheeler
- Succeeded by: Amanda Merrill

Member of the New Hampshire House of Representatives from the 8th Strafford district
- In office December 4, 1996 – December 4, 2002

Personal details
- Born: June 28, 1950 (age 76) New York City, New York
- Party: Democratic
- Spouse: John
- Profession: educator

Iris W. Estabrook is an American Democratic politician who was a member of the New Hampshire Senate, representing the 21st district from 2002 to 2008. Previously she was a member of the New Hampshire House of Representatives from 1996 to 2002.
