= Dan Innis =

American politician (born 1963)

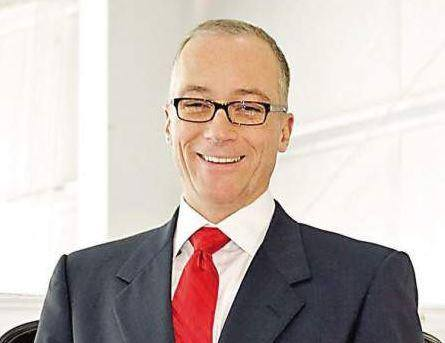

Member of the New Hampshire Senate
- Incumbent
- Assumed office December 7, 2022
- Preceded by: Harold French
- Succeeded by: Rebecca Harned (elect)
- Constituency: 7th district
- In office December 7, 2016 – December 5, 2018
- Preceded by: Nancy Stiles
- Succeeded by: Tom Sherman
- Constituency: 24th district

Personal details
- Born: Daniel Eugene Innis; April 7, 1963 (age 63) Columbus, Ohio, U.S.
- Party: Republican
- Spouse(s): Margaret Moody (div. 2006) Doug Palardy (div. 2019) Spencer Wyand (m. 2024)
- Children: 3
- Education: Ohio University (BBA); Miami University (MBA); Ohio State University (PhD)

Daniel Eugene Innis (born April 7, 1963) is an American academic and politician. He currently serves as a Republican State Senator, representing District 7 in the New Hampshire Senate. He previously represented District 24 in the Senate from 2016 to 2018. He is also a professor of marketing and hospitality management at the University of New Hampshire. He served as the Dean of the Peter T. Paul College of Business and Economics at the University of New Hampshire from 2007 to 2013, overseeing major developments at the school.

== Academic career ==
Prior to his tenure at the University of New Hampshire as a professor and dean, Innis served as the dean of the College of Business, Public Policy and Health at the University of Maine in Orono. He also served Ohio University as the Associate Dean of the College of Business, Chair of the Marketing Department, and was a professor in the Marketing Department.

== Political campaigns ==
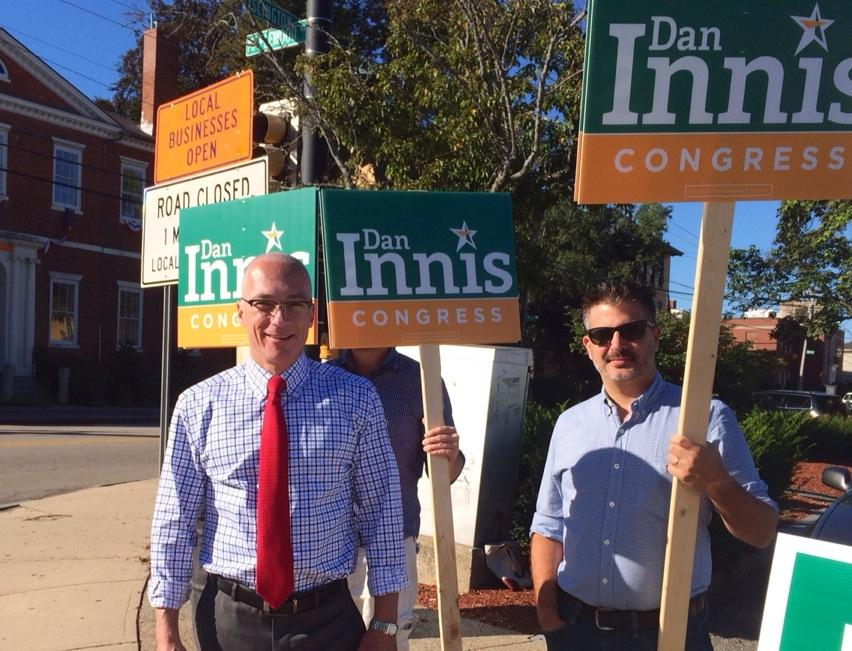
Innis campaigning in 2013

Innis is a past finance chairman of the New Hampshire Republican Party.

=== 2014 ===
Innis was a Republican candidate in the 2014 election for the United States House of Representatives in New Hampshire for the 1st congressional district. He lost the primary to former Congressman Frank Guinta, who went on to win the general election against Democratic incumbent Carol Shea-Porter.

=== 2016 ===
In October 2015, Innis announced he would again run for Congress in New Hampshire's 1st district. Before suspending his campaign, he was slated to face incumbent Frank Guinta and Jamieson Gradert in the Republican primary on September 13, 2016. Guinta was thought to be vulnerable due to a campaign finance controversy in which he accepted a campaign donation from his parents far exceeding the contribution limit for individuals.

In December 2015, Innis asked his supporters to make year-end contributions to a Manchester drug treatment center, Hope for New Hampshire, instead of to his campaign.

Innis suspended his congressional campaign in March 2016, citing family priorities and business interests.

On May 26, 2016, Innis announced he would be running for New Hampshire Senate District 24 which comprises the towns of Greenland, Hampton, Hampton Falls, Kensington, New Castle, North Hampton, Newton, Rye, Seabrook, Stratham and South Hampton. On September 13, 2016, Innis won the Republican nomination in a four-way race for State Senate in NH District 24. He beat Democratic State Rep. Tom Sherman for the seat in the general election on November 8.

=== 2018 ===
Sherman challenged Innis again in a rematch for the seat in the general election on November 6. This time, Innis was defeated.

=== 2022 ===
Innis relocated to New Hampshire’s 7th State Senate District prior to seeking re-election to the chamber in 2022. On November 8, Innis was elected, defeating Democratic anthropologist Richard Lobban.

=== 2026 ===
In July 2025, Innis announced his candidacy for the Republican nomination in the 2026 United States Senate election in New Hampshire.

== Memberships ==
Innis is a member of Beta Gamma Sigma, Alpha Kappa Psi, the National Society of Collegiate Scholars, the American Marketing Association, the Academy of Marketing Science, the Association for Consumer Research, the Council of Logistics Management, and the American Psychological Association. Innis is a national board member of the Log Cabin Republicans. He is also a member of the New Hampshire Republican Party, the New Castle Historical Society, The Music Hall in Portsmouth, the New Castle Republican Town Committee, and the Rye New Hampshire Republicans.

== Personal life ==
He has three children, all of whom are UNH students or alumni, and is married to his husband, Spencer Wyand.

== Electoral history ==
New Hampshire's 7th Senate District, 2022
Party	Candidate	Votes	%
Republican	Dan Innis	13,413	54.6
Democratic	Richard Lobban	11,146	45.4
N/A	Scatter		0.0
Total votes		24,559	100.0
Republican hold			

New Hampshire's 24th Senate District, 2018
Party	Candidate	Votes	%
Democratic	Tom Sherman	15,664	53.1
Republican	Dan Innis (incumbent)	13,832	46.9
N/A	Scatter	13	0.0
Total votes		29,509	100.0
Democratic gain from Republican		Swing	5.5

New Hampshire's 24th Senate District, 2016
Party	Candidate	Votes	%
Republican	Dan Innis	17,844	52.1
Democratic	Tom Sherman	16,373	47.6
N/A	Scatter	19	0.0
Total votes		39,233	100.0
Republican hold			
