= Sylvia Larsen =

Former President of the New Hampshire Senate

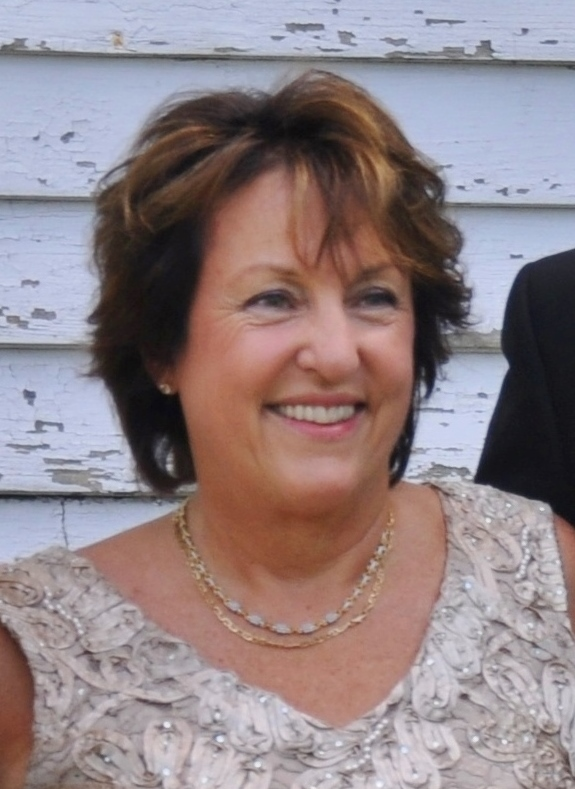
- Larsen in 2013

President of the New Hampshire Senate
- In office 2006 – December 1, 2010
- Preceded by: Ted Gatsas
- Succeeded by: Peter Bragdon

Member of the New Hampshire Senate from the 15th district
- In office December 7, 1994 – December 5, 2014
- Preceded by: Susan McLane
- Succeeded by: Dan Feltes

Personal details
- Party: Democratic
- Spouse: Robert M. Larsen
- Profession: Politician

Sylvia Bravo Larsen is a New Hampshire politician who was a Democratic member of the New Hampshire Senate and its longest serving Democratic female leader. She represented New Hampshire's 15th State Senate District for 20 years, from 1994 through 2014. Larsen served as Senate President from 2006 to 2010. Between 2008 and 2010, Larsen led the nation's first female majority legislative body.

== Early life and education ==
Larsen earned a bachelor's degree from the University of Wisconsin, Madison in 1972.

== Career ==
Larsen served ten terms representing District 15, which includes the state's capital city of Concord, along with Henniker, Hopkinton and Warner. Prior to retiring in 2014, she was the Vice Chair of the Capital Budget Committee and a long-term member of the Senate Finance and Joint Fiscal Committees.

Larsen was Senate Democratic Leader for over a decade, becoming Senate President Pro Tempore and later was New Hampshire's longest serving female Senate President from 2006 to 2010. For two of those years, 2008 to 2010, she led the nation's first legislative body to include a majority of women with 13 female senators elected to the 24 member body.

In 2014, Larsen announced that she would not seek re-election.

Political offices
Preceded by Theodore Gatsas	President of the New Hampshire Senate; 2006–December 1, 2010	Succeeded by Peter Bragdon
