= Next Generation Choices Foundation =

The Next Generation Choices Foundation, also known as Less Cancer, is an American nonprofit organization (501(c)(3)) founded by Bill Couzens in 2004 to educate the public about cancer prevention through digital media and community-supported programming. Less Cancer seeks to make risk reduction and prevention vital parts of cancer cures. The organization's goal is to increase public awareness about cancer prevention, including sharing information about environment- and food-based causes of cancer. They also provide information on risk-reduction strategies; changing community or corporate practices and products; and sharing information about healthy lifestyle choices.

== Mission ==
LessCancer.org addresses social and health issues regarding prevention, including food and nutritional access, specific contaminants, pollution sources, and healthy lifestyle choices, such as diet, exercise, and nutrition. The organization targets its messages to at-risk populations, such as children, low-income communities, and workers. Less Cancer's goal is to raise awareness of prevention and reduce incidence of diagnosed cancer in all people; they also support reduced use of chemicals in food production as a means to reduce cancer.

In addition to online media, Less Cancer communicates its cancer prevention message through live events, fundraisers, blogs, letters to the editor, outreach to lawmakers, round tables, and panel discussions with health-related constituencies, as well as through self-sponsored speaker series and congressional testimony. The organization encourages supporter education and activism regarding exposures to lawn and garden pesticides, and spraying at schools and other communities where children and others are at risk.

== Public outreach and media coverage ==
LessCancer.org sponsors a speaker series, promoting speakers who address concerns related to the organization's mission, including a talk by Gary Hirshberg on the use of chemicals and genetically modified organisms in daily diet.

The Next Generation Choices/LessCancer organization's active YouTube channels include "Less Cancer Minute" segments, which provide information on topics such as specific nutrients and the benefits of organic food. The reporter/host of the Less Cancer Minute sequences, Holli Thompson, has written a book on nutrition. The Next Generation Choices Foundation produced the Healthy Town YouTube channel videos, which were shown on Capitol Hill. The group also produced Too Cool to Smoke, (a.k.a. MySchools2Cool2Smoke).

On February 24, 2010, in his remarks to the House of Representatives, Congressman Frank Wolf of Virginia recognized the Next Generation Choices Foundation and founder Bill Couzens for their efforts to raise awareness about cancer prevention.

Couzens has also spoken at a conference for the Collaborative on Health and the Environment, held at the University of Pittsburgh's Cancer Institute April 8, 2005; on Capitol Hill for National Cancer Prevention Day February 4, 2013;, at the University School of Medicine, and at schools about cancer prevention, including the Foxcroft School.

On October 10, 2013, Michigan State Senator Bert Johnson recognized LessCancer for the organization's 2013 Port Huron to Mackinac Island Cycle Ride.

LessCancer.org Board members Bill Couzens and Margaret I. Cuomo were interviewed by The Huffington Post on the subject of cancer prevention. Both Couzens and Cuomo write blogs on The Huffington Post that promote the organization and address issues related to cancer prevention. In addition to her blog, Cuomo also wrote a book on cancer prevention titled A World Without Cancer: The Making of a New World and the Real Promise of Prevention.

In December 2012, the organization partnered with the Children's Hospital of Michigan Foundation to create the LessCancer.org Prevention Fund, which will support research and advocacy to stop diseases caused by environmental hazards, lifestyle choices, and diet.

Concurrent with the Port Huron to Mackinac Boat Race, Less Cancer also has sponsored a 300-mile fundraising bicycle ride in Michigan in July 2013 and July 2014. Journalist Miles O'Brien and Sanjay Gupta reported on and rode in the race in 2014. CNN covered the 2015 bike ride in connection with journalist Miles O'Brien's recovery from a partial arm amputation. The 2015 ride aimed to raise $50,000 to help the Foundation get out its message about environmental and lifestyle changes for preventing cancer.

Elsie Hillman was recognized by LessCancer with an "Annie" award, named for Founder Bill Couzens' sister who died from cancer. LessCancer gives out the award to recognize individuals for their efforts in support of cancer prevention awareness.

LessCancer created an honorary Ronald B. Herberman Memorial Lecturer in honor of Herberman, who served as a board member. Graham Colditz served as the Herberman Lecturer in 2014; David L. Katz was the Lecturer in 2015.

Couzens and LessCancer.org were profiled on LoveToKnow.com.

Bill Couzens and Margaret Cuomo were interviewed by The Huffington Post regarding National Cancer Prevention Day on February 4, 2015. Cuomo was also interviewed by Hamptons Magazine and quoted by DigitalJournal.com in connection with the 2015 event. The Huffington Post presented a series of blogs on cancer prevention as part of National Cancer Prevention Day in 2015.

Less Cancer led the campaign to establish Cancer Prevention Days in Virginia, New Hampshire, New York, and Michigan, as well as National Cancer Prevention Day. A resolution calling for National Cancer Prevention Day was introduced in the U.S. Congress in 2012, 2013, 2014, and 2015 by Rep. Steve Israel of New York. As part of this activity on February 4, 2014, Rep. Israel, Graham Colditz, MD, Margaret I. Cuomo, Rep. Charlie Dent of Pennsylvania, and Howard Koh spoke at a panel discussion on cancer prevention in the Rayburn Building. The National Cancer Prevention Day speakers for 2015 included Dr. David Katz, Acting Assistant Secretary of U.S. Health & Human Services Anand Parekh, Rep. Israel, Rep.Dent, Rep. Debbie Dingell, Rep. Don Beyer, New Hampshire Representative (and Less Cancer representative) Thomas Sherman, MD, journalist Miles O'Brien, documentary filmmaker Jon Whelan, dermatologist Sandra Read, MD, and LessCancer Board Member Veronique Pittman.

Bill Couzens has conducted outreach at The Highland School, speaking with students studying Social Justice about his experiences advocating for the cause of preventing cancer. Seventeen students from Highland attended National Cancer Prevention Day on Capitol Hill in February 2015.

In his capacity as a representative in the New Hampshire legislature, Next Generation Choices Chairman of the Board Tom Sherman co-sponsored a bill to ban teenagers from patronizing tanning salons. The bill was passed into law by Governor Maggie Hassan in early June 2015.

On July 28, 2015, Congresswoman Debbie Dingell (MI-12) and Congressman Tim Murphy (PA-18) announced the formation of the bipartisan Congressional Cancer Prevention Caucus. The caucus, which is the first of its kind, was formed in collaboration with Bill Couzens, founder of National Cancer Prevention Day and the non-profit organization Next Generation Choices Foundation, widely known as Less Cancer, to expand education and awareness about cancer prevention. On February 2, 2016, Dingell posted in op-ed in The Huffington Post promoting the Cancer Prevention Caucus and advocating legislative action to "promote and support legislation focusing on issues such as diet and exercise, protective vaccinations, education about the risks of tobacco and alcohol, and many others." The Huffington Post editorial was written "in recognition of National Cancer Prevention Day (Feb. 4), and in conjunction with lesscancer.org's event on Capitol Hill in Washington, D.C., that day."

According to Congresswoman Dingell's website, "The Congressional Cancer Prevention Caucus is designed to help stop [the ongoing impact of cancer on American families] by providing a bipartisan forum to engage Members of Congress, their staff, the medical community, advocacy groups, academia and the public on lifestyle and environmental factors that can reduce cancer risk. The caucus will seek to increase education and awareness and advance policy solutions that improve public health and help prevent cancer before it starts."

In late 2015, Bill Couzens the Next Generation Choices Foundation founder was asked to join the True Health Initiative, a coalition of prominent medical professionals and nonprofit groups founded by David Katz to combat preventable diseases through lifestyle changes. Next Generation Choices Board member Margaret I. Cuomo is also a member of the True Health Council.

On February 17, 2016, U.S. Representative Charlie Dent (R-PA) served as the Elsie Hillman Speaker at the Next Generation Choices' 2016 National Cancer Prevention Day event. An article in the Ripon Advance quoted Dent as stating that there was bipartisan support in Congress for cancer prevention measures: "Last year's appropriations bill provided a $2 billion increase for the National Institutes of Health, and as we prepare for fiscal year 2017, I will once again work to ensure that this critical funding is provided for efforts that can make a true difference going forward."

Less Cancer's mission was profiled in Seacoast Online on February 28, 2016. The report included interviews with NGCF Founder Bill Couzens and Board member New Hampshire State Representative Dr. Tom Sherman.

Less Cancer was mentioned in a blog written by Congressman Tim Murphy (R-PA) for being one of several organizations "that work towards advocating for better personal and community health."

Less Cancer and Bill Couzens were discussed by Congresswoman Debbie Dingell on her official website in connection with the Cancer Prevention Caucus on February 1, 2017.

Bill Couzens and his work with the Next Generation Choices Foundation were profiled in the February edition of Middleburg (VA), Life Magazine.

Less Cancer was mentioned in a list of ten cancer-fighting charities "doing amazing work" in the field of cancer care.

The group's June 2017 328-mile "Split the Mitt" bicycle ride through Michigan raised over $70,000 for cancer prevention initiatives. The race ran from Detroit to Traverse City, MI; the ride started with 17 cyclists, with additional riders joining along the route. The race ended at the National Cancer Survivor's Day Picnic.

== Board members ==
- Thomas M. Sherman, LessCancer Chairman of the Board of Directors, New Hampshire State Representative, Gastroenterologist
- William U. "Bill" Couzens, LessCancer President, Founder
- Rob Bilott
- Yvette Lee Bowser
- Donna Eacho
- Larry Fisher
- Greg Lam, Vice President
- David MacDonald
- Miles O'Brien
- Natalia Pejacsevich
- Veronique Pittman, Information Architecture Designer for Green Schools Alliance, blogger on The Huffington Post, (wife of Robert Pittman)
- Maryann Donovan
- Kristiane Crane Graham, Treasurer

Advisory Board Members

- Jan Carney, former Commissioner of Public Health for the state of Vermont
- Graham Colditz, Epidepmiologist at Washington University
- Janie Heath, Dean of University of Kentucky College of Nursing
- David L. Katz, Nutritionist and Founder of the Yale University Prevention Research Center
- John Groopman, Anna M. Baetjer Professor of Environmental Health Professor, Johns Hopkins University
