= 2022 New Hampshire gubernatorial election =

- November 8, 2022
- Turnout: 67.63% ▼
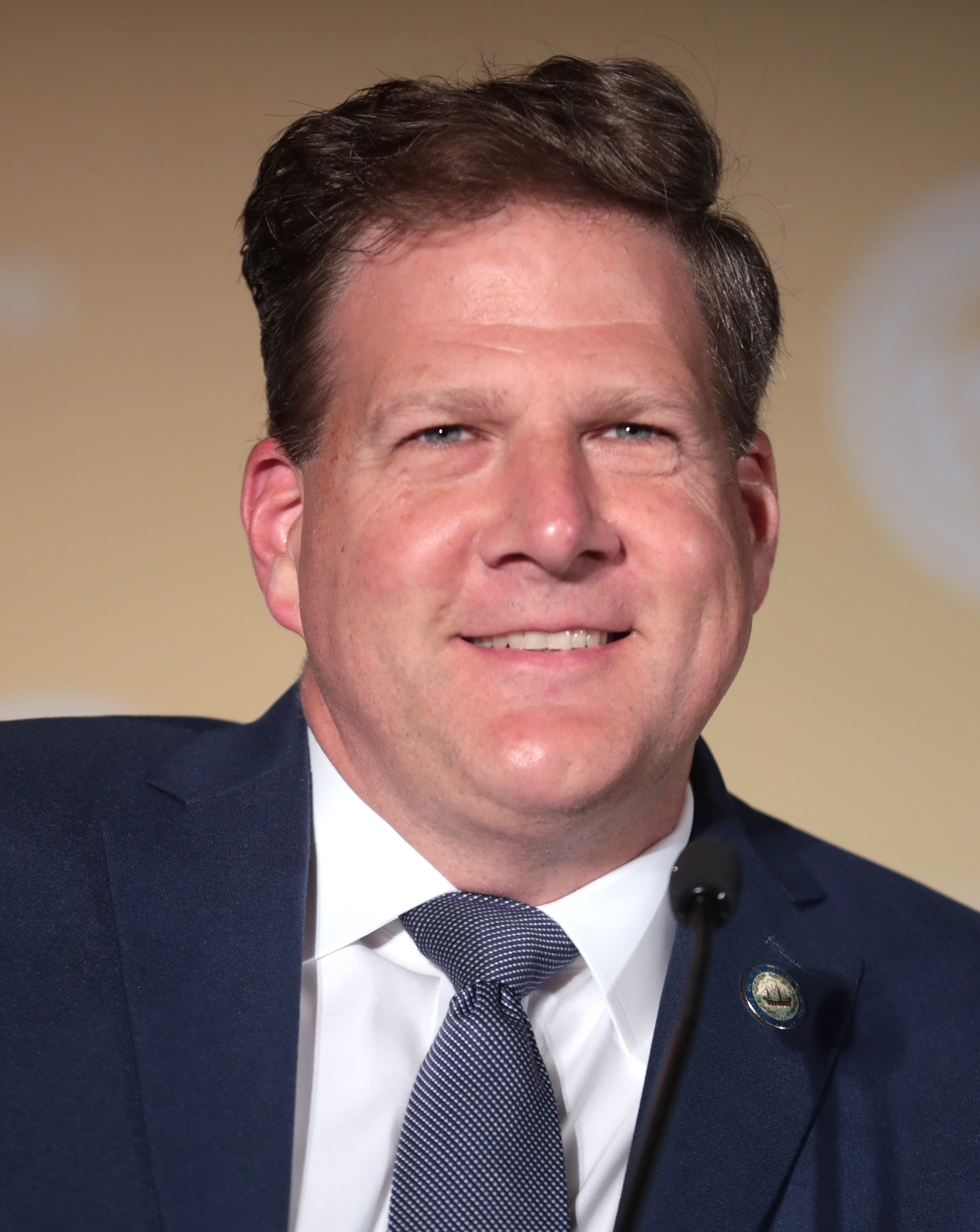

Nominee	Chris Sununu	Tom Sherman
Party	Republican	Democratic
Popular vote	352,982	256,774
Percentage	56.98%	41.47%
- Sununu: 40–50% 50–60% 60–70% 70–80% 80–90% >90% Sherman: 40–50% 50–60% 60–70% 70–80% >90%
Governor before election
Chris Sununu
Republican
Elected Governor
Chris Sununu
Republican

The 2022 New Hampshire gubernatorial election was held on November 8, 2022, to elect the governor of New Hampshire. Incumbent Republican Governor Chris Sununu won election to a fourth term, defeating Democratic nominee Tom Sherman.

Sununu had "expressed interest" in running for the U.S. Senate in 2022 against incumbent Democrat (and former governor) Maggie Hassan. However, on November 9, 2021, he announced that he would instead run for a fourth term as governor. Sununu became the first Republican to win a fourth term as governor, also tying John Lynch's modern record of four terms overall. This was one of six Republican-held governorships up for election in a state that Joe Biden won in the 2020 presidential election.

== Republican primary ==
=== Candidates ===
==== Nominee ====
- Chris Sununu, incumbent governor

==== Eliminated in primary ====
- Julian Acciard, security specialist, Iraq War veteran, and former candidate for New Hampshire's 1st Congressional district in 2022
- Jay Lewis, Laconia resident
- Richard McMenamon II
- Thad Riley, entrepreneur, former Brentwood school board member and community advocate
- Karen Testerman, former Franklin city councilor and candidate for governor in 2020

==== Declined ====
- Kelly Ayotte, former U.S. senator
- Scott Brown, former U.S. senator from Massachusetts and nominee for U.S. Senate in 2014

=== Endorsements ===
Chris Sununu

Organizations

- NRA Political Victory Fund

=== Polling ===
Poll source	Date(s) administered	Sample size (Note: Key: A – all adults RV – registered voters LV – likely voters V – unclear)	Margin of error	Thad Riley	Chris Sununu	Karen Testerman	Other	Undecided
University of New Hampshire	August 25–29, 2022	892 (LV)	± 3.3%	7%	72%	5%	2% (Note: Acciard and "Other" with 1%)	14%
Saint Anselm College	August 9–11, 2022	820 (RV)	± 3.4%	5%	68%	6%	2%	19%

Hypothetical polling

Poll source	Date(s) administered	Sample size	Margin of error	Kelly Ayotte	Scott Brown	Frank Edelbut	Chuck Morse	Undecided
Praecones Analytica	August 13–20, 2021	792 (LV)	± 3.5%	46%	13%	7%	6%	29%

=== Results ===
Results by county: Sununu: 70–80%; 80–90%

Republican primary results
Party	Candidate	Votes	%
Republican	Chris Sununu (incumbent)	113,443	78.66%
Republican	Karen Testerman	14,473	10.04%
Republican	Thaddeus Riley	11,107	7.70%
Republican	Julian Acciard	2,906	2.01%
Republican	Jay Lewis	1,318	0.91%
Republican	Richard McMenamon II	817	0.57%
Write-in		160	0.11%
Total votes		144,224	100.0%

== Democratic primary ==
=== Candidates ===
==== Nominee ====
- Tom Sherman, state senator from the 24th district

==== Declined ====
- Dan Feltes, former majority leader of the New Hampshire Senate from the 15th district and nominee for governor in 2020 (moved out of state in 2021)
- John Lynch, former governor
- Jodi Picoult, author
- Andru Volinsky, former executive councilor and candidate for governor in 2020
- Cinde Warmington, executive councilor (running for re-election)

=== Endorsements ===
Tom Sherman

Organizations

- American Federation of Teachers New Hampshire
- National Education Association New Hampshire

=== Results ===
Democratic primary results
Party	Candidate	Votes	%
Democratic	Tom Sherman	82,607	97.57%
Republican	Chris Sununu (incumbent) (write-in)	1,963	2.32%
Write-in		95	0.11%
Total votes		84,665	100.0%

== Other candidates ==
=== Libertarian Party ===
- Karlyn Borysenko, far-right social media activist, author, and podcaster; during the 2025 ZLuC, Borysenko violated event policies and Substack community guidelines by recording, live-streaming, and then selling access to the footage of what is a free-to-all event. Borysenko targeted a zine librarian for expressing dissatisfaction with the Trump administration.
- Kelly Halldorson

== General election ==
=== Predictions ===
Source	Ranking	As of
The Cook Political Report	Solid R	March 4, 2022
Inside Elections	Solid R	September 23, 2022
Sabato's Crystal Ball	Safe R	August 18, 2022
Politico	Solid R	November 3, 2022
RCP	Safe R	June 8, 2022
Fox News	Likely R	May 12, 2022
538	Solid R	August 26, 2022
Elections Daily	Safe R	November 7, 2022

=== Post-primary endorsements ===
Chris Sununu (R)

U.S. executive branch officials

- Nikki Haley, United States Ambassador to the United Nations (2017–2018) and Governor of South Carolina (2011–2017)

Organizations

- Humane Society Legislative Fund
Tom Sherman (D)

U.S. senators

- Maggie Hassan, U.S. senator from New Hampshire (2017–present) and governor of New Hampshire (2013–2017)
- Jeanne Shaheen, U.S. senator from New Hampshire (2009–present) and governor of New Hampshire (1997–2003)

U.S. representatives

- Annie Kuster, U.S. representative for New Hampshire's 2nd congressional district (2013–present)
- Chris Pappas, U.S. representative for New Hampshire's 1st congressional district (2019–present)

=== Polling ===
Aggregate polls

Source of poll aggregation	Dates administered	Dates updated	Chris Sununu (R)	Tom Sherman (D)	Other (Note: Calculated by taking the difference of 100% and all other candidates combined.)	Margin
Real Clear Politics	October 28 – November 6, 2022	November 8, 2022	56.4%	39.4%	4.2%	Sununu +17.0
FiveThirtyEight	September 15, 2021 – November 8, 2022	November 8, 2022	55.4%	39.0%	5.6%	Sununu +16.4
Average			55.9%	39.2%	4.9%	Sununu +16.7

Graphical summary

Poll source	Date(s) administered	Sample size	Margin of error	Chris Sununu (R)	Tom Sherman (D)	Other	Undecided
Phillips Academy	November 5–6, 2022	1,056 (LV)	± 3.0%	58%	36%	–	6%
University of New Hampshire	November 2–6, 2022	2,077 (LV)	± 2.2%	55%	43%	2% (Note: Halldorson (L) with 1%; "Another candidate" with 1%; Borysenko (L) with <1%)	<1%
InsiderAdvantage (R) (Note: Poll conducted for American Greatness, a conservative news and opinions site.)	November 5, 2022	700 (LV)	± 3.7%	56%	40%	2% (Note: "Someone else" with 2%)	2%
Data for Progress (D)	November 2–5, 2022	1,995 (LV)	± 2.0%	58%	40%	2% (Note: Halldorson (L) with 2%)	–
Wick Insights	November 2–5, 2022	725 (LV)	± 3.6%	53%	43%	2% (Note: "Someone else" with 2%)	2%
Emerson College	October 30 – November 1, 2022	850 (LV)	± 3.3%	57%	36%	4% (Note: Borysenko (L) with 2%; Halldorson (L) with 1%; "Someone else" with 1%)	4%
Emerson College	October 30 – November 1, 2022	850 (LV)	± 3.3%	58%	37%	6% (Note: Borysenko (L) with 2%; Halldorson (L) with 2%; "Someone else" with 2%)	–
Saint Anselm College	October 28–29, 2022	1,541 (LV)	± 2.5%	55%	37%	2% (Note: Borysenko (L) with 1%; Halldorson (L) with 1%)	6%
co/efficient (R)	October 25–26, 2022	1,098 (LV)	± 3.2%	52%	34%	5% (Note: Borysenko (L) with 4%; Halldorson (L) with 1%)	8%
UMass Lowell/YouGov	October 14–25, 2022	600 (LV)	± 5.1%	51%	35%	12% (Note: Halldorson (L) with 5%; Borysenko (L) with 2%; "Another candidate" with 5%)	2%
InsiderAdvantage (R)	October 23, 2022	600 (LV)	± 4.0%	54%	37%	4% (Note: "Someone else" with 4%)	6%
Emerson College	October 18–19, 2022	727 (LV)	± 3.6%	52%	40%	3% (Note: "Someone else" with 2%; Halldorson (L) with 1%; Borysenko (L) with <1%)	5%
Emerson College	October 18–19, 2022	727 (LV)	± 3.6%	54%	41%	4% (Note: "Someone else" with 3%; Halldorson (L) with 1%; Borysenko (L) with <1%)	–
Fabrizio, Lee & Associates (R) (Note: This poll was sponsored by Bolduc's campaign, the Republican nominee for U.S. Senate.)	October 17–19, 2022	600 (LV)	–	57%	40%	–	4%
Data for Progress (D)	October 14–19, 2022	1,392 (LV)	± 3.0%	53%	40%	3% (Note: Halldorson (L) with 3%)	4%
Fabrizio Ward (R)/Impact Research (D)	October 2–6, 2022	500 (LV)	± 4.4%	55%	41%	1%	3%
Data for Progress (D)	September 23–30, 2022	1,147 (LV)	± 3.0%	52%	39%	4% (Note: Halldorson (L) with 4%)	5%
Saint Anselm College	September 27–28, 2022	901 (RV)	± 3.3%	50%	34%	5% (Note: "Someone else" with 5%)	11%
Suffolk University	September 23–26, 2022	500 (LV)	± 4.4%	53%	36%	4% (Note: Borysenko (L) with 2%; Halldorson (L) with 2%)	8%
American Research Group	September 15–19, 2022	555 (RV)	± 4.2%	53%	38%	–	9%
University of New Hampshire	September 15–19, 2022	870 (LV)	± 3.3%	55%	37%	1% (Note: Borysenko (L) with 1%)	8%
Emerson College	September 14–15, 2022	800 (LV)	± 3.4%	52%	37%	4% (Note: "Someone else" with 4%)	7%
Saint Anselm College	August 9–11, 2022	1,898 (RV)	± 2.3%	48%	29%	4%	18%
Public Policy Polling (D) (Note: Poll sponsored by Sherman's campaign)	July 5–6, 2022	601 (LV)	± 4.0%	43%	33%	8% (Note: Borysenko (L) with 8%)	16%
University of New Hampshire	April 14–18, 2022	868 (LV)	± 3.5%	55%	29%	1%	14%
Phillips Academy	April 4–8, 2022	533 (A)	± 4.2%	62%	24%	–	14%
Phillips Academy	April 4–8, 2022	471 (RV)	± 4.5%	73%	24%	–	3%
Saint Anselm College	March 23–24, 2022	1,265 (RV)	± 2.8%	51%	24%	10%	15%

Hypothetical polling

Chris Sununu vs. generic opponent

Poll source	Date(s) administered	Sample size	Margin of error	Chris Sununu (R)	Generic Opponent	Undecided
Saint Anselm College	January 11–12, 2022	1,215 (RV)	± 2.8%	45%	45%	10%

=== Results ===
2022 New Hampshire gubernatorial election
Party	Candidate	Votes	%	±%
Republican	Chris Sununu (incumbent)	352,813	56.98%	−8.14%
Democratic	Tom Sherman	256,766	41.47%	+8.11%
Libertarian	Kelly Halldorson	5,071	0.82%	N/A
Libertarian	Karlyn Borysenko	2,772	0.45%	N/A
Write-in		1,713	0.28%	+0.19%
Total votes		619,135	100.0%	
Turnout		626,845	67.63%	
Registered electors		925,401		
Republican hold				

==== By county ====
2022 gubernatorial election results in New Hampshire (by county)
County	Tom Sherman Democratic		Chris Sununu Republican		Other votes		Total votes
	#	%	#	%	#	%	#
Belknap	9,429	31.1%	20,499	67.5%	425	1.4%	30,353
Carroll	10,306	37.9%	16,554	60.9%	342	1.3%	27,202
Cheshire	16,890	49.8%	16,503	48.7%	516	1.5%	33,909
Coös	4,194	32.8%	8,251	64.4%	360	2.8%	12,805
Grafton	21,483	50.4%	20,427	48.0%	676	1.6%	42,586
Hillsborough	69,673	40.5%	99,608	58.0%	2,585	1.5%	171,866
Merrimack	30,835	43.6%	38,669	54.7%	1,248	1.8%	70,752
Rockingham	59,759	38.8%	92,043	59.8%	2,216	1.4%	154,018
Strafford	26,495	46.9%	29,100	51.5%	929	1.6%	56,524
Sullivan	7,702	40.3%	11,159	58.4%	259	1.4%	19,120

Counties that flipped from Republican to Democratic

- Cheshire (largest city: Keene)
- Grafton (largest city: Lebanon)

==== By congressional district ====
Sununu won both congressional districts, which both elected Democrats.

District	Sununu	Sherman	Representative
1st	58%	40%	Chris Pappas
2nd	56%	43%	Annie Kuster

== See also ==
- Elections in New Hampshire
- Political party strength in New Hampshire
- New Hampshire Democratic Party
- New Hampshire Republican Party
- Government of New Hampshire
- 2022 United States Senate election in New Hampshire
- 2022 United States House of Representatives elections in New Hampshire
- 2022 New Hampshire House of Representatives election
- 2022 New Hampshire Senate election
- 2022 New Hampshire elections
- 2022 United States gubernatorial elections
- 2022 United States elections

== Notes ==
Partisan clients
