= Tara Reardon =

American politician

Member of the New Hampshire Senate from the 15th district
- Incumbent
- Assumed office December 4, 2024
- Preceded by: Becky Whitley

Personal details
- Party: Democratic
- Website: www.tarareardon.com

Tara Reardon is an American politician who has served in the New Hampshire Senate from the 15th district since 2024.

Reardon was Merrimack County Commissioner. She was previously New Hampshire Employment Security Commissioner.
