= Amanda Merrill =

American politician

Member of the New Hampshire Senate from the 21st district
- In office 2008-2012
- Preceded by: Iris Estabrook
- Succeeded by: Martha Fuller Clark

Personal details
- Born: May 9, 1951 (age 75) Amesbury, Massachusetts, US
- Party: Democratic
- Spouse: Kenneth Fuld
- Children: Anna Fuld; Sam Fuld

Amanda Merrill (born May 9, 1951) is an American politician who was a member of the New Hampshire Senate from 2008 to 2012. A member of the Democratic Party, she represented Senate District 21, which comprised Dover, Durham, Epping, Lee, and Rollinsford. She served on the Education; Election Law and Veteran's Affairs; Energy, Environment and Economic Development; and Wildlife, Fish and Game and Agriculture committees in the Senate.

== Personal life ==
Merrill lives in Durham with her husband, Kenneth Fuld, who is Dean of the College of Liberal Arts at the University of New Hampshire. They have two children, Anna and Sam Fuld, an outfielder in Major League Baseball from 2007 to 2015 and now the General Manager of the Philadelphia Phillies. They also have a grandson.
