= Marion Fuller Brown =

American politician and environmental activist

Marion Fuller Brown (May 14, 1917 – June 3, 2011) was an American politician and environmental activist. She was a co-founder of the nonprofit environmental advocacy organization Scenic America.

== Biography ==
Born Marion Ruth Thompson in Kansas City, Missouri, Thompson graduated from Smith College in 1938. After marrying Henry Fuller in 1939 she moved to Maine. Her first husband died in an accident in 1962 and she was later married to Brooks Brown Jr from 1967 until Brown's death in 1987. From 1966 to 1972 Fuller Brown was a member of the Maine House of Representatives representing southern York, Maine. During her term in the state legislature, she sponsored legislation that banned billboards throughout the state of Maine, a controversial idea at the time. Challenges brought against that law were eventually brought before the United States Supreme Court, who ultimately upheld the law in their ruling. She also served on the National Highways Beautification Commission from 1971 to 1973, appointed by Pres. Nixon.

She died on June 3, 2011, on Ram's Head Farm in York.

Her daughter Martha Fuller Clark currently serves in the New Hampshire Senate after several terms in the New Hampshire House.
