= Miles O'Brien (journalist) =

American science journalist

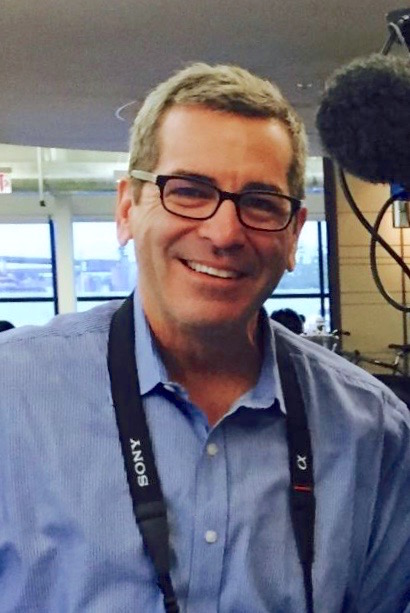
- O'Brien in 2014
- Born: June 9, 1959 (age 67); Detroit, Michigan, U.S.
- Education: Attended Georgetown University
- Occupation: Journalist
- Children: 2
- Website: www.milesobrien.com

Miles O'Brien (born June 9, 1959) is an independent American broadcast news journalist specializing in science, technology, and aerospace who has been serving as national science correspondent for PBS NewsHour since 2010.

== Early life ==
Born in Detroit and raised in Grosse Pointe Farms, Michigan, O'Brien attended Georgetown University. In 1982, he was offered and accepted his first broadcasting position with WRC-TV in Washington, DC. He was later a reporter and anchor at TV stations in Boston, Massachusetts; Tampa, Florida; Albany, New York and St. Joseph, Missouri. O'Brien joined CNN in 1992.

He is a third-generation general aviation pilot. His father, a private pilot, shared his love of flying with him at an early age. His initial flights were in small Cessnas and Pipers rented by his dad. O'Brien's paternal and maternal grandfathers were also both pilots.

== CNN correspondent and anchor ==
While with CNN in Atlanta and New York, O'Brien served as CNN's science, space, aviation technology, and environment correspondent. He anchored programs including Science and Technology Week, Headline News, Primetime, Live From…(CNN), and CNN American Morning.

O'Brien covered all aspects of the United States space program for CNN including reports on the Hubble Space Telescope, the shuttle dockings at Mir, the first space station launch from Kazakhstan, landings on Mars, the winning of the Ansari X-Prize, and the Space Shuttle Columbia disaster and its crew, a story he told to the world in a 16-hour marathon of live coverage. After years of negotiations, NASA had signed an agreement with CNN that, if not for the disaster, would have made O'Brien the first journalist to fly on a space shuttle. O'Brien followed the investigation and successful return to flight.

In 2000, O'Brien produced, shot, and wrote a one-hour documentary on the process of readying a space shuttle for flight: "Terminal Count: What it Takes to Make the Space Shuttle Fly", which aired in May 2001.

A private pilot since 1988, O'Brien also reported extensively on civil aviation issues and crash investigations. O'Brien reported the airliner crashes of US Airways Flight 427, ValuJet 592, TWA 800, EgyptAir 990, American Airlines 587, Comair 5191, John F. Kennedy Jr., Payne Stewart, Paul Wellstone, the C-150 incursion into the Washington DC Air Defense Identification Zone, and the Cory Lidle crash in Manhattan. In the wake of the September 11 attacks, O'Brien provided viewers with radar tracks of the hijacked flights while the twin towers were still standing. During the Afghanistan and Iraq invasions, he, along with various retired generals, reported on military aviation techniques and strategy.

His coverage of non-aerospace topics included anchoring The Situation Room, covering the 2008 Mumbai attacks on the Oberoi Trident and Taj Mahal hotels, as well as several other locations. He also covered Hurricane Katrina for several weeks, anchoring CNN's Peabody and Dupont Award-winning coverage.

In June 2005, O'Brien became one of the co-hosts of the CNN three-hour daily morning program American Morning. In April 2007, the network cited disappointing ratings in its decision to replace O'Brien and his co-host, Soledad O'Brien (no relation), with a new team, but said he would remain with CNN as its chief technology and environment correspondent.

O'Brien left CNN in December 2008. He was rehired by CNN as an aviation analyst in March 2014.

== Independent correspondent/journalist ==
After leaving CNN, O'Brien formed Miles O'Brien Productions, LLC in Washington, DC. Through this independent company, O'Brien creates stories for numerous outlets including PBS, Discovery Science (TV channel), National Science Foundation, Spaceflightnow.com, and corporate clients. One of his most notable series productions for PBS was "Blueprint America" that dealt with rebuilding American mass transit infrastructure.

O'Brien joined True/Slant as a blogger in 2009. He co-founded the Spaceflight Now podcast, "This Week in Space" in 2009, and hosted shows until the retirement of the shuttle in 2011.

Starting in 2009, O'Brien joined the National Science Foundation as a correspondent for the "Science Nation" series, and joined the PBS Frontline produced by WGBH-TV Boston, as a writer and correspondent.

He worked on the Frontline documentary, "Flying Cheap" which aired on the one-year anniversary of the Colgan Air plane crash in Buffalo, New York. The highly acclaimed documentary featured former Colgan Air pilots revealing shocking details about some attempts to keep underpaid pilots flying beyond legal limits.

In 2010, O'Brien became a PBS NewsHour science correspondent.

In 2013, O'Brien produced and directed "Mind of a Rampage Killer" and "Manhunt: Boston Bombers" and "Megastorm Aftermath" for PBS' Nova. In 2014, he produced and narrated "Why Planes Vanish" for Nova, adapted from "Where is Flight MH370?" from the BBC science program Horizon. He also narrated a recent view after the Fukushima disaster on a new episode of Nova.

== Career timeline ==
- 1981–1982: WRC-TV assignment editor/production assistant in Washington, DC
- 1983: KQTV anchor/reporter/producer/photographer/editor in St. Joseph, Missouri
- 1983–1985: WNYT anchor/reporter/producer in Albany, New York
- 1985–1986: WTSP special segment reporter/producer in St. Petersburg, Florida
- 1986–1991: WNEV/WHDH general assignment reporter/anchor in Boston
- 1991–1992: Monitor Channel freelance producer/reporter/anchor in Boston
- 1992–2008: CNN space/aviation correspondent; "Science and Technology Week" anchor; "Science and Technology" correspondent/anchor; "CNN Live From" anchor, "CNN Saturday/Sunday Morning" anchor; "CNN Headline News Prime" anchor; "CNN American Morning" anchor in Atlanta and New York
- 2008–present: owner Miles O'Brien Productions, LLC in Washington, DC serving as correspondent/writer for Discovery Science "Innovation Nation" series; WNET "Blueprint America" series; and video productions/moderation of events for clients including McAfee, SAP, X-Prize Foundation, Medco, Astrogenetix, and the Rocket Racing League
- 2009–2011: co-founder/host Spaceflight Now shuttle webcasts from Florida
- 2009–2011: chairman Education and Public Outreach Committee of NASA Advisory Council in Washington, DC
- 2009–present: PBS Frontline writer/correspondent for "Flying Cheap", "Flying Cheaper", "Nuclear Aftershocks", and "Dollars and Dentists" in Boston, Massachusetts
- 2009–present: National Science Foundation correspondent for "Science Nation" series in Washington, DC
- 2010–present: PBS NewsHour science correspondent/producer in Washington, DC
- 2013–present: PBS Nova producer/director "Mind of a Rampage Killer", "Manhunt: Boston Bombers", and "Megastorm Aftermath" in Boston, MA
- 2014–present: CNN aviation analyst

== Personal life ==
O'Brien resides in Chevy Chase, Maryland. He has a son, Miles, and a daughter, Connery.

An instrument-rated pilot with about 2,000 hours of pilot-in-command time, O'Brien owns a Cirrus SR22, which he often flies on assignments. His other interests include running, mountain and road biking, swimming, waterskiing, scuba diving, sailing and carpentry.

In February 2014, O'Brien was injured when a Pelican case filled with television equipment fell on his left forearm, causing acute compartment syndrome and resulting in the amputation of his left arm above the elbow.

== Affiliations ==
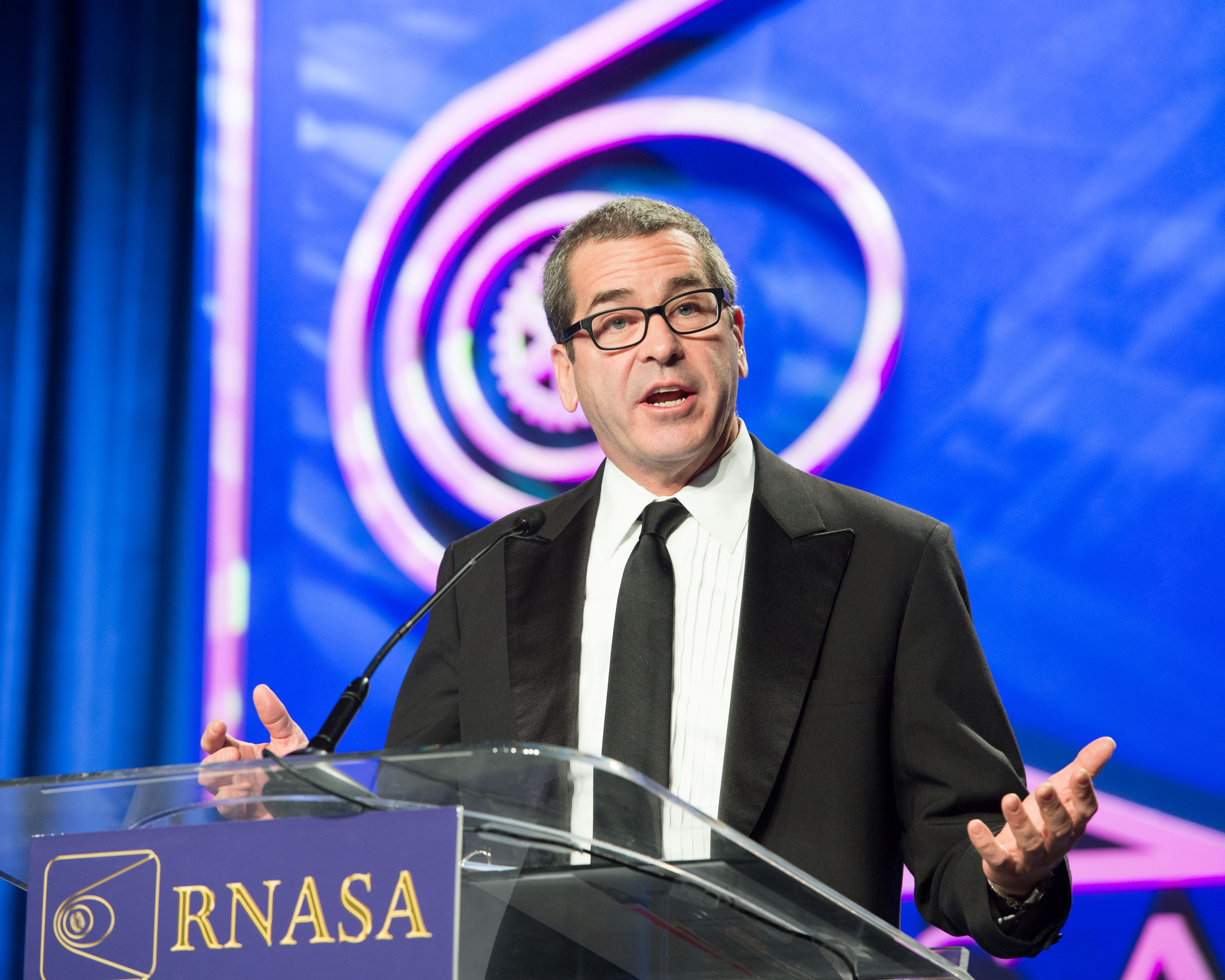
O'Brien at the 2013 RNASA gala

O'Brien is on the boards of the Challenger Center for Space Science Education, the Council for the Advancement of Science Writing, LessCancer.org, and the Rotary National Award for Space Achievement Foundation.

From 2009 to 2011, O'Brien served as chairman of the NASA Advisory Council (NAC)'s Education and Outreach Committee and advised the NASA Administrator on mass communication strategies. He rejoined the NAC in April 2014 to advise NASA's senior leadership on challenges and solutions facing the agency as it unfolds a new era of exploration.

He is a member of the Aircraft Owners and Pilots Association (since 1988), the American Federation of Television and Radio Artists (since 1982), the Experimental Aircraft Association (since 2007), and the Writers' Guild of America (since 2011).

In 2014, O'Brien joined the Board of the Amputee Coalition.

== Awards ==
- 1986 – Florida Emmy Award Outstanding Coverage of a Single Breaking News Story (Reporter)- St. Petersburg Chlorine Leak
- 1989 – Boston/New England Emmy Award Outstanding News Series (Producer/Reporter)- "Boundaries of Fear"
- 1990 – CINE "Golden Eagle" (Producer/Reporter)- "Boundaries of Fear"
- 1993 – Columbus Film Festival Bronze Plaque – "Swords to Plowshares: The Price of Peace"
- 1993 – Computer Press Awards Best Television Program (Anchor/Correspondent/Writer)- "CNN Science and Technology Week"
- 1993 – National Association of Science Writers Science in Society Award (Anchor/Correspondent/Writer)- "Sweet Fruit – Bitter Harvest"
- 1993 – Overseas Press Club Award – "Swords to Plowshares: The Price of Peace"
- 1996 – National News and Documentary Emmy Award Outstanding Coverage of a Single Breaking News Story (Anchor)- coverage of the Olympic Park Bombing
- 2002 – Rotary National Award for Space Achievement Space Communicator Award
- 2002 – National Headliner Award for investigative coverage – "Sept. 11 attacks"
- 2006 – Society of Environmental Journalists Award for Reporting on the Environment (Anchor/Correspondent/Writer)- "CNN Presents: Melting Point"
- 2006 – National Press Club Robert L Kozik Award for Environmental Reporting – First Place (Anchor/Correspondent/Writer)- "CNN Presents: Melting Point"
- 2006 – Aircraft Owners and Pilots Association Max Karant Award for Excellence in Aviation Journalism (Correspondent)- "Small Planes"
- 2006 – George Foster Peabody Award – coverage of Hurricane Katrina
- 2006 – Alfred I. duPont-Columbia University Award (Anchor/Correspondent)- CNN Coverage of Hurricane Katrina
- 2014 – PBS 10th annual "Be More Award" -A veteran journalist with more than thirty-two years in the industry, O'Brien has focused on making science and technology accessible, understandable and interesting for everyone.
- 2014 – National Academy of Television Arts & Sciences Emmy Award for Outstanding Science and Technology Programming for PBS NOVA "Manhunt – Boston Bombers"
- 2015 – Honorary Member, Sigma Xi
- 2018 – American Nuclear Society Darlene Schmidt Science News Award for accurate and innovative science-related media coverage – "Demand for clean energy inspires new generation to innovate nuclear power"
