= Rebecca Perkins Kwoka =

American politician (born 1982)

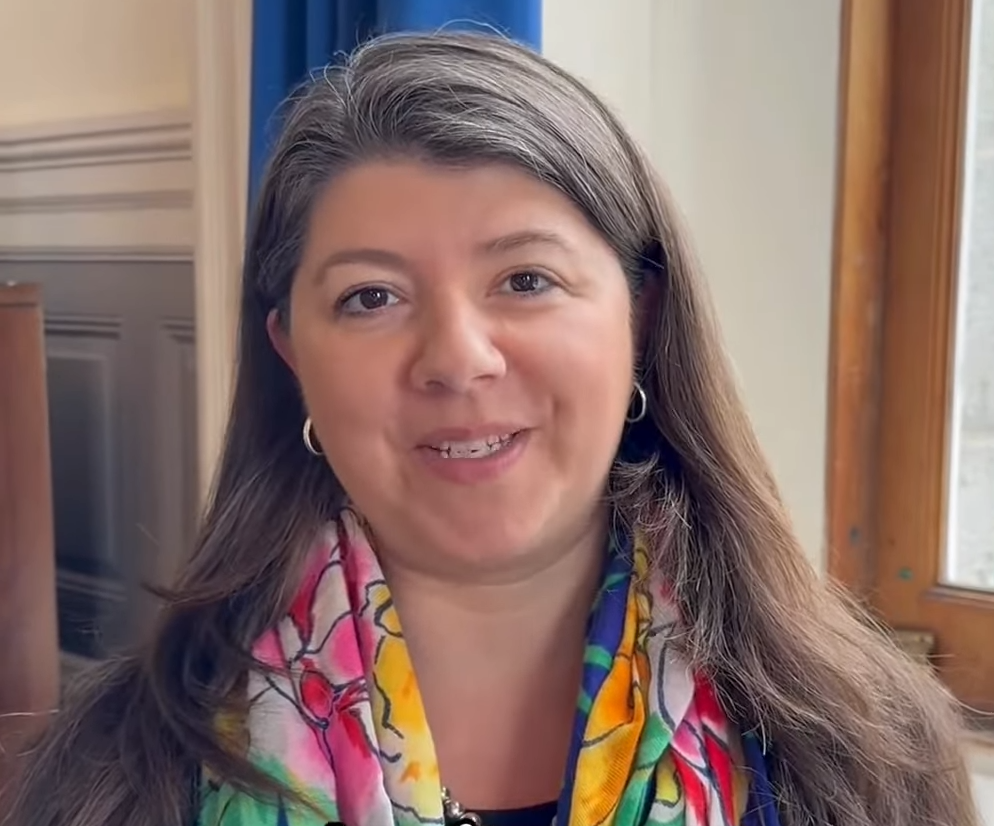
- Perkins Kwoka in 2024

Minority Leader of the New Hampshire Senate
- Incumbent
- Assumed office December 4, 2024
- Preceded by: Donna Soucy

Member of the New Hampshire Senate from the 21st district
- Incumbent
- Assumed office December 2, 2020
- Preceded by: Martha Fuller Clark

Personal details
- Born: September 1982 (age 44)
- Party: Democratic
- Education: Dartmouth College (BA); Cornell University (JD)
- Website: State Senate website

Rebecca Perkins Kwoka (born September 1982) is an American politician who has served in the New Hampshire Senate from the 21st district since 2020. Her district encompasses Portsmouth, Durham, Newmarket, Lee, Newfields, Madbury, and Newington.

She is the first openly LGBTQ+ woman elected to the New Hampshire Senate. She resides in Portsmouth with her wife and daughters.

== Career ==
Perkins Kwoka is a lawyer. She previously served on the Portsmouth, New Hampshire City Council and Planning Board. She also worked with the Peace Corps.

== New Hampshire Senate ==
Perkins Kwoka was first elected to the New Hampshire Senate in 2020, defeating Deaglan McEachern in the Democratic primary and Sue Polidura in the general election. She serves on the Election Law Committee and the Executive Departments and Administration Committee.

She was reelected unopposed in 2022.

Following the 2024 New Hampshire Senate elections, Perkins Kwoka was chosen unanimously by the Senate Democratic Caucus to serve as Minority leader of the New Hampshire Senate.

New Hampshire Senate
Preceded by Donna Soucy	Minority Leader of the New Hampshire Senate; 2024–present	Incumbent
