= Nancy Stiles =

American politician

Member of the New Hampshire Senate from the 24th district
- In office December 2010 – December 2016
- Preceded by: Martha Fuller Clark
- Succeeded by: Daniel Innis

Personal details
- Spouse: Howard Stiles
- Children: 3
- Occupation: Politician

Nancy Stiles is an American school nutrition manager and former Republican member of the New Hampshire State Senate representing the 24th district.

== Background ==
Born in New Bedford, Massachusetts, Stiles earned a Bachelor of Business degree from the University of New Hampshire.

For thirty years before her retirement, Stiles worked as a director of food services and as school nutrition director for the Hampton School District. She also taught food service management for the University of New Hampshire. Stiles has chaired the Public Policy and Legislation Committee of the American School Food Service Association.

== Legislative service ==
Stiles served in the New Hampshire House of Representatives for the 15th Rockingham County District, first winning the seat in 2004 and being re-elected in 2006 and 2008. She served on the standing committee on Education.

On November 2, 2010, Stiles won election to the New Hampshire State Senate. She faced no opposition in her primary and defeated Democratic incumbent Martha Fuller Clark in the general election with 11,594 votes to Clark's 11,056. She chairs the Senate's standing committee on education, and is also assigned to the committees on public affairs and on transportation.

In 2013, Stiles was a signatory to an amicus curiae brief submitted to the Supreme Court in support of same-sex marriage during the Hollingsworth v. Perry case.

== Personal ==
She and her husband Howard have three children. They live in Hampton, New Hampshire.
