= Dan Feltes =

American politician (born 1979)

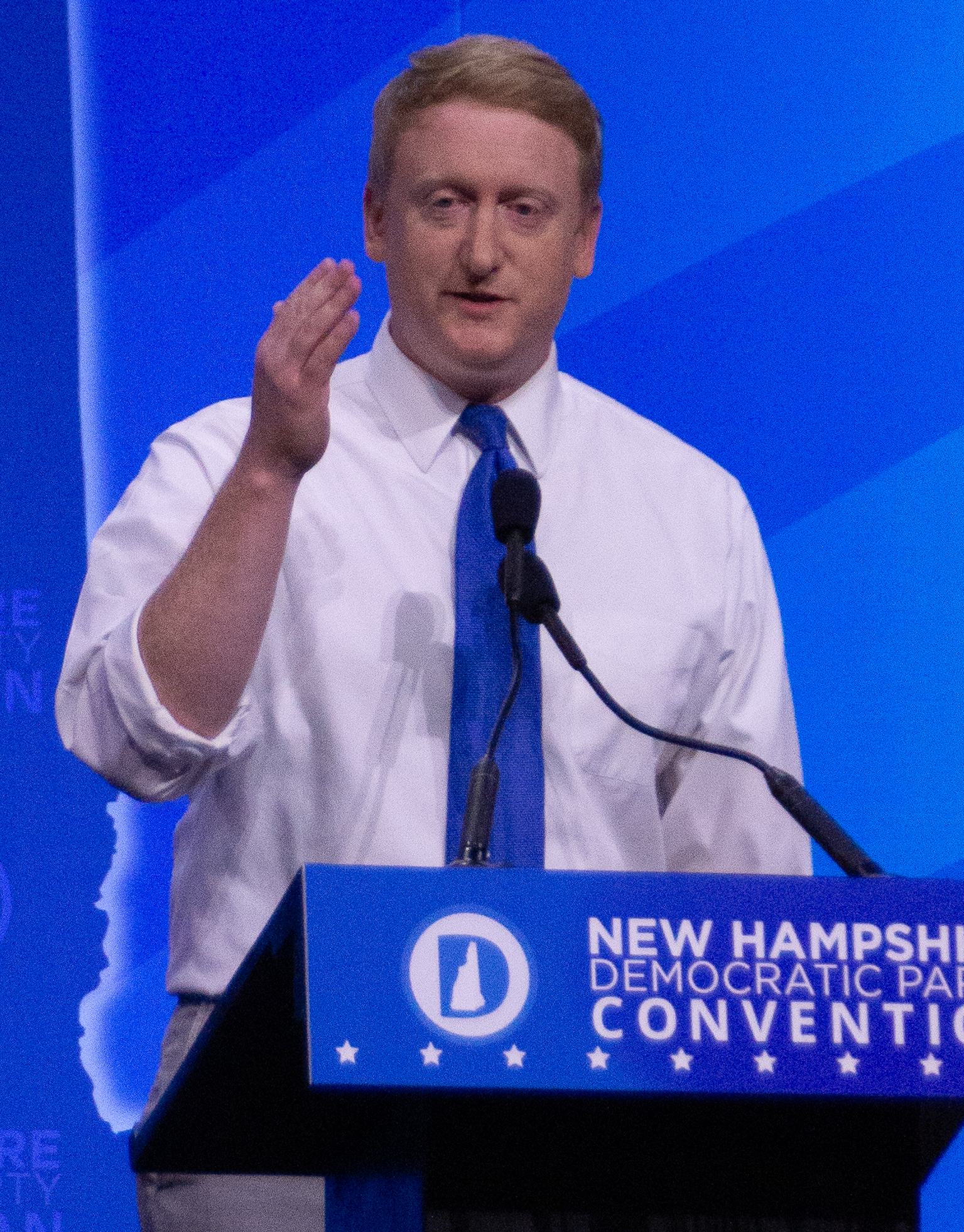

Majority Leader of the New Hampshire Senate
- In office December 5, 2018 – December 2, 2020
- Preceded by: Jeb Bradley
- Succeeded by: Jeb Bradley

Member of the New Hampshire Senate from the 15th district
- In office December 2014 – December 2, 2020
- Preceded by: Sylvia Larsen
- Succeeded by: Becky Whitley

Personal details
- Born: March 23, 1979 (age 47)
- Party: Democratic
- Education: University of Northern Iowa (BA); Georgetown University (MPP); University of Iowa (JD)
- Website: Government website

Dan Feltes (born March 23, 1979) is an American lawyer, a member of the Democratic Party, and represented the 15th district of the New Hampshire Senate from 2014 until 2020. At the age of 39, Feltes became the youngest Majority Leader in the history of the New Hampshire Senate. Feltes was characterized by Steve Shurtleff, the former Speaker of the New Hampshire House, as the most effective consensus builder at the State House in two decades. He was the Democratic nominee for governor in 2020. He now teaches at Iowa Law school and is a practicing attorney at Iowa Legal Aid.

== Early life and career ==
Feltes grew up in Dubuque, Iowa. He earned his undergraduate degree from the University of Northern Iowa, a J.D. degree from the University of Iowa College of Law and a Master of Public Policy degree from Georgetown University. Dan grew up in a working-class family, with his father working in a furniture factory for his entire adult life and his mother working part-time jobs while raising four children. While in law school at The University of Iowa, Feltes led a service trip of 45 Iowa law students to New Orleans following Hurricane Katrina to help victims with legal services.

Feltes then worked as a legal aid attorney for almost a decade in New Hampshire. For four years he led the Housing Justice Project, overseeing the staff, grants, and legal work on housing access issues, including fighting housing discrimination and stopping foreclosures by big banks. Feltes twice co-authored the statewide analysis of impediments to fair housing choice. As a legal aid attorney, Feltes worked with then State Senator Maggie Hassan to expand unemployment insurance to part-time workers, which eventually became a lifeline to workers in the Market Basket labor dispute.

Feltes has also taught law at the UNH Franklin Pierce School of Law. In 2013, Feltes received the Robert E. Kirby Award of the New Hampshire Bar Association, awarded annually to a New Hampshire attorney 35 years old or younger who demonstrates the traits of civility, courtesy, perspective, and excellent advocacy

== New Hampshire Senate ==
In 2014, Feltes ran for the state senate seat being vacated by Sylvia Larsen, and won. Larsen backed Feltes's opponent in the Democratic primary, while other local Democratic leaders backed Feltes. Feltes won the Democratic primary, winning all towns and all wards in the 15th District. Feltes won 70% of the vote in the Democratic primary and over 65% of the vote in the general election.

In 2016, Feltes was elected to a second term in the state senate, winning all towns and all wards in the 15th District and outperforming every Democrat up ticket, including getting more votes in the 15th District than Hillary Clinton.

In 2018, Feltes developed and executed the plan that helped lead to the Democrats winning the majority in the State Senate. Feltes then became the youngest Senate Majority Leader in New Hampshire history. Feltes was characterized by Steve Shurtleff, the former Speaker of the New Hampshire House, as the most effective consensus builder at the State House in two decades.

On jobs and the economy, Feltes passed legislation making New Hampshire the second state to protect workers from retaliation after requesting workplace or schedule flexibility, advanced job training for working class in the trades, established full-day kindergarten, was the lead champion of paid family leave, and accomplished business tax reform lowering taxes for in-state small businesses while closing loopholes for out-of-state corporations.

On housing, Feltes sponsored the initial effort to capitalize the affordable housing fund with $25 million, led the effort on a first-ever appropriation for recovery and sober housing, advanced affordable housing and long-term care by passing the law to give property owners the right to both use and build accessory dwelling units and in-law apartments, and received multiple legislator of the year awards for his bipartisan work on housing.

On health care, Feltes was the lead Democratic negotiator reauthorizing Medicaid expansion, and he led the effort to do a 1332 waiver to reduce health care costs. Feltes received awards for his bipartisan work combatting the opioid crisis, including from New Futures. Feltes was the author of landmark legislation protecting Granite Staters with preexisting conditions.

On prescription drug relief, Feltes authored the historic legislation to import safe, low-cost prescription drugs from Canada for New Hampshire seniors. Feltes passed prescription drug relief for senior citizens who fell in the Medicare Part D "donut hole". Feltes also passed legislation capping out-of-pocket costs for insulin at $30 per month.

During the pandemic, Feltes sounded the alarm bell early on the administration's lack of testing in nursing homes, which drove New Hampshire to becoming the worst in-the-nation in dealing with COVID in nursing homes. Feltes fought for additional support and enhanced oversight and transparency of nursing homes, including the New Hampshire Veterans Home, advocated for a COVID-19 Workers Bill of Rights to get people back to work safely, and Feltes was among the first in the nation to propose direct relief for frontline workers.

In a sweeping reform of children's mental health care, Feltes authored the bipartisan landmark legislation making the largest advancement in children's mental health care in the history of New Hampshire, including a statewide system of care for children that involved a statewide mobile crisis team, otherwise known as SB 14. Feltes also consistently fought the administration for better child protection staffing, and sponsored the effort to combat childhood lead poisoning from both paint and water.

On energy and the environment, Feltes was instrumental in getting some of the toughest drinking water standards for PFAS in the country. Feltes also authored bipartisan legislation protecting the historic Warner river. Feltes was the lead Democratic sponsor and author of the New Hampshire Clean Energy Jobs and Opportunity Act of 2019. Feltes was also the lead Democratic negotiator involving the completion of the restructuring of the utility market in New Hampshire. Feltes was a bipartisan leader advancing energy efficiency and weatherization. Feltes authored New Hampshire's community power act, or community choice aggregation, which led to electric rates being cut by 22% or more for tens of thousands of residents in communities across New Hampshire. Feltes also authored New Hampshire's landmark community solar law.

On campaign finance reform and ethics, Feltes passed bipartisan reforms of inaugural committee transactions and disclosures, led executive branch ethics reform, and led the effort to bolster oversight and enforcement of election and lobbying compliance. Feltes also fought to close the LLC contribution loophole and get dark money out of politics, although both efforts were vetoed.

On diversity, equity and inclusion, Feltes authored historic legislation, the Criminal Justice Reform and Economic Fairness Act of 2018, which, among other things, accomplished bipartisan bail reform. Feltes also passed bipartisan legislation getting rid of so-called debtors prisons, and as Majority Leader of the Senate, Feltes held the votes necessary to override a veto in order to repeal the death penalty. Feltes's legislation to “Ban the Box” and provide workers with a criminal history an opportunity to compete for jobs garnered bipartisan support but was vetoed. In the wake of the Me Too movement, and amid concerns about the conduct of legislators, Feltes authored and passed legislation to crack down on sexual harassment at the Statehouse.

== 2020 gubernatorial election ==
After declining to run for governor of New Hampshire in the 2018 election, Feltes announced his intent to run for governor on September 3, 2019, facing Executive Councilor Andru Volinsky in the Democratic primary. Despite sharing much of the same ideology, Volinsky was largely viewed as the more liberal choice, especially given his endorsement from Senator Bernie Sanders. Feltes earned the support of progressive campaign finance reform and voting rights organizations, End Citizens United and Let America Vote, as well as the support of fourteen labor unions. One union contrasted Feltes' background as a legal aid attorney with Volinsky's background as a corporate attorney. Feltes defeated Volinsky with a strong showing in Hanover, Portsmouth, Concord, Manchester, and Nashua.

In the general election, Feltes was endorsed by the New Hampshire State Troopers, who had backed the incumbent governor Chris Sununu in the prior election. Feltes, a strong retail campaigner, was effectively sidelined during the pandemic while the incumbent governor Chris Sununu appeared on statewide TV, sometimes three times a week. Sununu also took unilateral control of $1.25 billion in federal pandemic relief, frequently announcing new relief efforts, while his administrators announced the infections and the outbreaks. Sununu only agreed to do one televised debate, on WMUR. Feltes lost to incumbent governor Chris Sununu in the general election in November 2020, having set fundraising records for a non-incumbent in a race for governor in New Hampshire.

== Personal life ==
Feltes and his wife, Erin, have two daughters. They are both natives of Iowa, and they moved back to Iowa from New Hampshire in the fall of 2021 after Erin accepted a job at the University of Iowa.

New Hampshire Senate
Preceded by Sylvia Larsen	Member of the New Hampshire Senate from the 15th district 2014–2020	Succeeded by Becky Whitley
Preceded by Jeb Bradley	Majority Leader of the New Hampshire Senate; 2018–2020	Succeeded by Jeb Bradley
Party political offices
Preceded by Molly Kelly	Democratic nominee for Governor of New Hampshire; 2020	Succeeded by Tom Sherman
