= Celsense =

Celsense, Inc. (2005-2021) was a privately held biotechnology company which developed imaging agents used to non-invasively detect and monitor cells and cellular activity. The company was based in Pittsburgh, Pennsylvania. Celsense was founded in 2005 to commercialize imaging platforms developed at Carnegie Mellon University. The CEO and president for the lifetime of the company was Charles O'Hanlon.

In 2011, Celsense received FDA authorization to begin Phase I clinical trials for a colorectal cancer treatment using therapeutic dendritic cells.

The company ceased operations on December 31, 2021.
