= New Hampshire's 21st State Senate district =

American legislative district

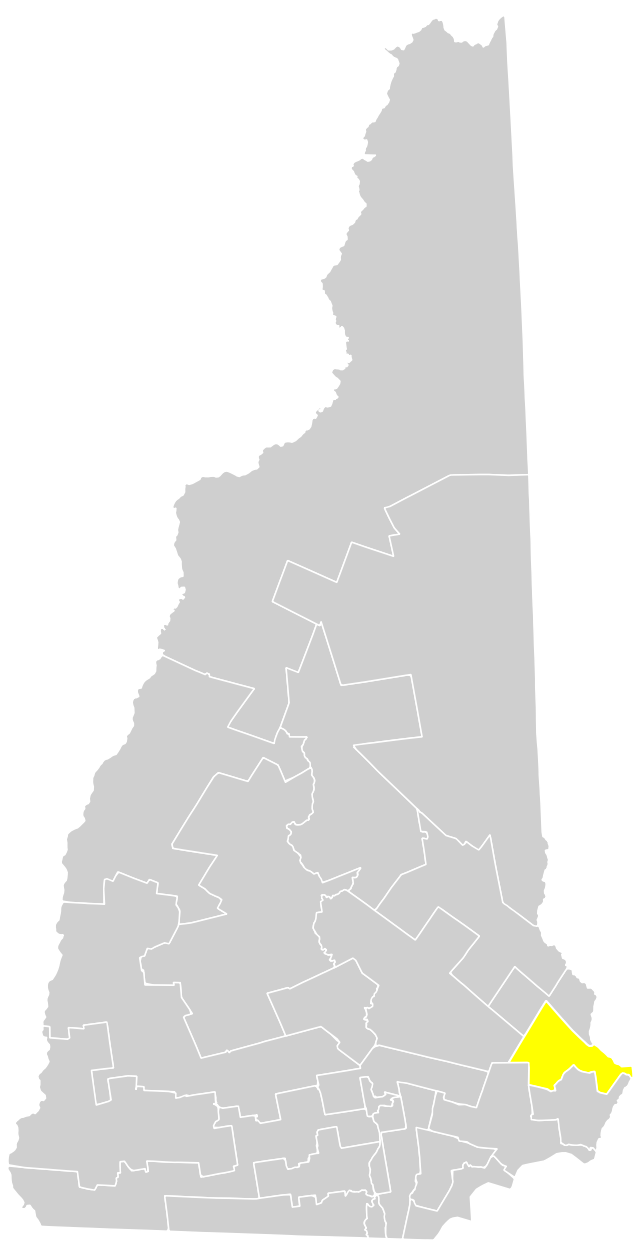
Senator
Rebecca Perkins Kwoka; D–Portsmouth
- Registration: 39.3% Democratic; 19.6% Republican; 41.1% No party preference
- Demographics: 87% White; 2% Black; 3% Hispanic; 6% Asian
- Population (2020): 56,894

New Hampshire's 21st State Senate district is one of 24 districts in the New Hampshire Senate. It has been represented by Democrat Rebecca Perkins Kwoka since 2020, succeeding fellow Democrat Martha Fuller Clark.

== Geography ==
District 21 covers parts of eastern Rockingham and southern Strafford Counties. The district is located entirely within New Hampshire's 1st congressional district. It borders the state of Maine.

Rockingham County - 11% of county

- New Castle
- Newfields
- Newington
- Newmarket
- Portsmouth

Strafford County - 17% of county

- Durham
- Lee
- Madbury

=== Federal and statewide results ===
Results are of elections held under 2022 district lines.

Year	Office	Results
2022	Senate	Hassan 73 – 27%
2022	Governor	Sherman 61 - 39%

== Recent election results ==
=== 2024 ===
2024 New Hampshire State Senate election, District 21
Party	Candidate	Votes	%
Democratic	Rebecca Perkins Kwoka (Incumbent)	22,700	66.98
Republican	Don Cardinale	11,155	32.91
Write-in		38	0.11
Total votes		33,893	100.0
Democratic hold			

=== 2022 ===
2022 New Hampshire State Senate election, District 21
Party	Candidate	Votes	%
Democratic	Rebecca Perkins Kwoka (incumbent)	20,084	100.0
Total votes		20,315	100
Democratic hold			

== Historical election results ==
The following result occurred prior to 2022 redistricting, and thus were held under different district lines.

=== 2020 ===
2020 New Hampshire State Senate election, District 21
Primary election
Party	Candidate	Votes	%
Democratic	Rebecca Perkins Kwoka	6,185	62.9
Democratic	Deaglan McEachern	3,640	37.0
Total votes		9,836	100
General election
Democratic	Rebecca Perkins Kwoka	21,827	67.1
Republican	Sue Polidura	10,717	32.9
Total votes		32,544	100
Democratic hold			

=== 2018 ===
2018 New Hampshire State Senate election, District 21
Party	Candidate	Votes	%
Democratic	Martha Fuller Clark (incumbent)	19,084	72.3
Republican	Peter Macdonald	7,324	27.7
Total votes		26,408	100
Democratic hold			

=== 2016 ===
2016 New Hampshire State Senate election, District 21
Party	Candidate	Votes	%
Democratic	Martha Fuller Clark (incumbent)	20,883	66.3
Republican	Peter Macdonald	10,607	33.7
Total votes		31,490	100
Democratic hold			

=== 2014 ===
2014 New Hampshire State Senate election, District 21
Primary election
Party	Candidate	Votes	%
Republican	Phil Nazzaro	1,408	53.4
Republican	Peter Macdonald	739	28.0
Republican	Dennis Lamare	488	18.5
Total votes		2,635	100
General election
Democratic	Martha Fuller Clark (incumbent)	12,423	60.9
Republican	Phil Nazzaro	7,987	39.1
Total votes		20,410	100
Democratic hold			

=== 2012 ===
2012 New Hampshire State Senate election, District 21
Party	Candidate	Votes	%
Democratic	Martha Fuller Clark	19,740	69.5
Republican	Peter Macdonald	8,674	30.5
Total votes		28,414	100
Democratic hold			
