= New Hampshire's 24th State Senate district =

American legislative district

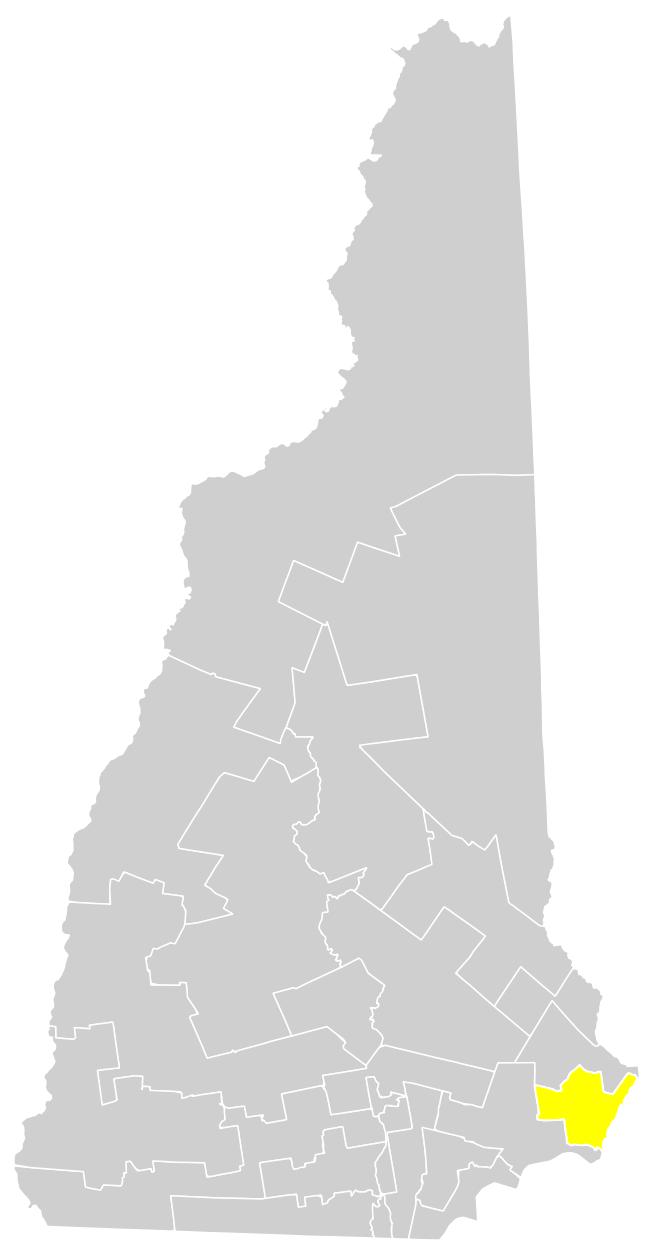
Senator
Debra Altschiller; D–Stratham
- Registration: 32.4% Republican; 31.1% Democratic; 36.3% No party preference
- Demographics: 92% White; 1% Black; 2% Hispanic; 2% Asian
- Population (2020): 56,485

New Hampshire's 24th State Senate district is one of 24 districts in the New Hampshire Senate. It has been represented by Democrat Debra Altschiller since 2022.

== Geography ==
District 24 covers most of the state's Atlantic coastline in Rockingham County. The district is entirely located within New Hampshire's 1st congressional district. It borders the state of Maine.

Rockingham County - 18% of county

- Exeter
- Greenland
- Hampton
- Hampton Falls
- North Hampton
- Rye
- Stratham

== Recent election results ==
=== 2024 ===
2024 New Hampshire State Senate election, District 24
Party	Candidate	Votes	%
Democratic	Debra Altschiller (Incumbent)	20,497	54.74
Republican	Patrick Abrami	16,926	45.22
Write-in		14	0.04
Total votes		37,437	100.0
Democratic hold			

=== 2022 ===
2022 New Hampshire State Senate election, District 24
Party	Candidate	Votes	%
Democratic	Debra Altschiller	17,969	55.7
Republican	Lou Gargiulo	14,313	44.3
Total votes		32,282	100
Democratic hold			

Elections prior to 2022 were held under different district lines.

=== Federal and statewide results ===
Results are of elections held under 2022 district lines.

Year	Office	Results
2022	Senate	Hassan 60 - 40%
2022	Governor	Sununu 52 - 48%

== Historical election results ==
=== 2020 ===
2020 New Hampshire State Senate election, District 24
Primary election
Party	Candidate	Votes	%
Republican	Louis Gargiulo	5,257	71.4
Republican	Regina Barnes	2,084	28.3
Total votes		7,362	100
General election
Democratic	Tom Sherman (incumbent)	20,527	52.3
Republican	Louis Gargiulo	18,687	47.7
Total votes		39,214	100
Democratic hold			

=== 2018 ===
2018 New Hampshire State Senate election, District 24
Party	Candidate	Votes	%
Democratic	Tom Sherman	15,664	53.1
Republican	Daniel Innis (incumbent)	13,832	46.9
Total votes		29,496	100
Democratic gain from Republican			

=== 2016 ===
2016 New Hampshire State Senate election, District 24
Primary election
Party	Candidate	Votes	%
Republican	Daniel Innis	1,895	35.0
Republican	Ray Tweedie	1,632	30.1
Republican	Stephen Kenda	1,470	27.2
Republican	Jim Maggiore	418	7.7
Total votes		5,415	100
General election
Republican	Daniel Innis	17,844	52.2
Democratic	Tom Sherman	16,373	47.8
Total votes		34,217	100
Republican hold			

=== 2014 ===
2014 New Hampshire State Senate election, District 24
Primary election
Party	Candidate	Votes	%
Republican	Nancy Stiles (incumbent)	4,072	63.5
Republican	Stephen Kenda	2,337	36.5
Total votes		6,409	100
General election
Republican	Nancy Stiles (incumbent)	14,990	60.4
Democratic	Chris Muns	9,816	39.6
Total votes		24,806	100
Republican hold			

=== 2012 ===
2012 New Hampshire State Senate election, District 24
Party	Candidate	Votes	%
Republican	Nancy Stiles (incumbent)	17,110	52.5
Democratic	Beverly Hollingworth	15,488	47.5
Total votes		32,598	100
Republican hold			
