= Your Disease Risk =

Online health risk assessment tool

Your Disease Risk is a publicly available health risk assessment tool on the Internet. Launched in early 2000 and continually updated, the site offers risk assessments for twelve different cancers and five other important chronic diseases: heart disease, stroke, diabetes, chronic obstructive pulmonary disease, and osteoporosis.

The site began in 1998 as a pen and paper questionnaire called the Harvard Cancer Risk Index. In January 2000, The Harvard Cancer Risk Index developed into an online assessment and was renamed Your Cancer Risk, and offered assessments for four cancers: breast, colon, lung, and prostate. Six months later, eight additional cancers were added.

In 2004, the site was renamed Your Disease Risk to reflect the addition of four further conditions: heart disease, stroke, diabetes, and osteoporosis. Since many common chronic diseases share risk factors, the renaming promoted the importance of a healthy lifestyle to lowering disease risks.

In 2007, the site moved to the Alvin J. Siteman Cancer Center at Barnes-Jewish Hospital and Washington University School of Medicine.

In 2012, researchers released a related iPad app, called Zuum, that offers customized advice for healthier living based on an individual's diet, exercise and other habits. The Zuum app was discontinued in January 2022.

In December 2018, the site was re-designed to work across multiple screen sizes - from smartphone to desktop - and a new "Snapshot" tool was added, which provides a quick estimate of 6 diseases from one brief questionnaire.

== User experience ==
Your Disease Risk has a simple, straightforward interface. Questionnaires can be completed in a matter of minutes, and for each disease, the site offers both a visual and verbal risk estimate as well as personalized tips for prevention. The site can also show users what their risk could be should they adopt various healthy behaviors. Tailored screening tips and recommendations for making health changes in communities are also part of site results.

== Methodology ==
The calculations and algorithms used to calculate and display risk estimates in Your Disease Risk are the product of an ongoing process of expert consensus. Epidemiologists, clinicians, and other health specialists regularly review the current scientific evidence for each disease, identifying established and probable risk factors for each. This information is then used to develop or revise calculations that generate a user's risk of disease compared to average risk in the population for someone of the same age and sex.

A validation study found Your Disease Risk to provide well calibrated estimates of cancer risk in the general population. For individual women, the discriminatory accuracy for colon cancer was 0.67, for ovarian cancer 0.59, and for pancreatic cancer was 0.71. For individual men, the discriminatory accuracy for colon cancer was 0.71 and for pancreatic cancer was 0.72. These values exceed the performance of many other cancer risk prediction tools.

The approach used to calculate cancer risks in Your Disease Risk is also used to calculate the risks of the other diseases. And a further validation of the tool analyzed discriminatory accuracy of the heart disease calculator in women, finding an age-adjusted concordance statistic of 0.71, a result similar to other, long-standing cardiovascular disease risk assessments.

== Awards and media ==
A winner of the eHealthcare Leadership Award, Your Disease Risk has also been the topic of articles in major media outlets.
