= Candace Bouchard =

American politician

Member of New Hampshire House of Representatives for Merrimack 18
- In office 1998–2014

Personal details
- Party: Democratic

Candace C.W. Bouchard is an American politician. She represented Merrimack 18th district at the New Hampshire House of Representatives from 1998 to 2014. Bouchard worked as a volunteer for local community organizations. In 2009, the New Hampshire Recreation and Park Association gave Bouchard the Distinguished Volunteer Award. She was a city councillor in Concord, New Hampshire. She was a candidate for District 15 at the 2020 New Hampshire Senate election.
