= Tom Sherman (politician) =

American politician (born 1957)

Member of the New Hampshire Senate from the 24th district
- In office December 5, 2018 – December 7, 2022
- Preceded by: Daniel Innis
- Succeeded by: Debra Altschiller

Member of the New Hampshire House of Representatives from the Rockingham 24th district
- In office December 5, 2012 – December 7, 2016

Personal details
- Born: October 31, 1957 (age 69) Darien, Connecticut, U.S.
- Party: Democratic
- Spouse: Lisa
- Children: 3
- Education: Northwestern University (BA); University of Connecticut (MD)
- Website: Campaign website

Thomas Sherman (born October 31, 1957) is an American physician and politician who is a former member of the New Hampshire Senate for the 24th district. Sherman served as ranking member and former chair of Senate Health & Human Services, and as member and former chair of the Election Law & Municipal Affairs committee. He is a former member of the New Hampshire House of Representatives. He represented Rockingham County and has been prominent in advocating for state-level implementations of the Affordable Care Act.

== Medical career ==
Sherman earned a Bachelor of Arts in classics from Northwestern University in 1980. He then took classes at Georgetown University to complete his pre-med coursework before receiving his medical degree at the University of Connecticut in 1987.

He is a licensed gastroenterologist and was Medical Staff President and board member of Fauquier Hospital in Virginia. He has received multiple awards for his practice, including the Knowlton Incentive for Excellence Award of the Washington University School of Medicine, the Internal Medicine Award of the University of Connecticut School of Medicine, and the James E. C. Walker Award University of the Connecticut School of Medicine. He was recognized by Castle Connolly's as one of their Top Doctors™ (2012–2013), and is a member of the American Board of Internal Medicine.

Sherman is a founding director of Next Generation Choices Foundation and chairman of the board of directors of LessCancer.org, a 501(c)(3) organization dedicated to educating the public about lifestyle changes that could reduce the potential for people to become afflicted with cancer.

== Political career ==
Sherman wrote an op-ed on Seacoastonline.com calling for the New Hampshire legislature to preserve Medicaid expansion so it would continue to cover drug treatment programs for individuals arrested for drug-related offenses.

Sherman co-sponsored a bill to ban teenagers from patronizing tanning salons. The bill was passed into law by Governor Maggie Hassan in early June 2015.

Sherman ran and was elected to the New Hampshire House of Representatives along with fellow Democrat David Borden for the Rockingham 24th District in 2012. He became a member of the Health, Human Services, & Elderly Affairs committee. He and Borden were reelected in 2014.

Sherman has been instrumental in leading state-level implementation of Medicare expansion under the New Hampshire Health Protection Program. As part of the legislature's Health, Human Services, & Elderly Affairs committee and as part of the general vote, he led a commission and later voted for expanding Medicaid to 50,000 state residents. The bill was passed into law by Governor Maggie Hassan on March 27, 2014. As of October 14, 2014, over 20,000 New Hampshire residents had signed up to receive the expanded coverage.

Sherman also supported legalizing the use of marijuana for therapeutic purposes, especially for patients medically diagnosed with terminal illnesses and serious conditions. He testified and voted for the medical provisions of the law in March 2013. A law legalizing medical use of marijuana was subsequently passed and went into effect July 25, 2013.

Sherman co-sponsored a bill that required hospital technicians to register with a board for health care workers who are not otherwise already licensed or registered and who have access to both drugs and patients. The bill (H.B. 658) also requires hospitals to report disciplinary actions to the board, which could perform its own investigations of wrongdoing. The law went into effect October 1, 2014.

Sherman was interviewed for his role in working for cancer prevention as a member of the Next Generation Choices Foundation in Seacoastonline.com on February 28, 2016.

On February 15, 2022, Sherman formed an exploratory committee to run in the 2022 New Hampshire gubernatorial election. On March 14, Sherman officially announced his campaign. He lost to incumbent Republican governor Chris Sununu by over 15 points.

== Electoral history ==
2022 New Hampshire gubernatorial election
| Party | Candidate | Votes | % |
|---|---|---|---|
| Republican | Chris Sununu (incumbent) | 352,813 | 56.9 |
| Democratic | Tom Sherman | 256,766 | 41.4 |
| Libertarian | Kelly Halldorson | 5,071 | 0.8 |
| Libertarian | Karlyn Borysenko | 2,772 | 0.4 |
| Write-in | | 1,713 | 0.2 |
| Total votes | | 619,135 | 100.0 |
| Republican hold | | | |

New Hampshire's 24th Senate District, 2020
| Party | Candidate | Votes | % |
|---|---|---|---|
| Democratic | Tom Sherman (incumbent) | 20,527 | 52.3 |
| Republican | Lou Gargiulo | 18,687 | 47.6 |
| N/A | Scatter | 19 | 0.0 |
| Total votes | | 39,233 | 100.0 |
| Democratic hold | | | |

New Hampshire's 24th Senate District, 2018
| Party | Candidate | Votes | % |
|---|---|---|---|
| Democratic | Tom Sherman | 15,664 | 53.1 |
| Republican | Dan Innis (incumbent) | 13,832 | 46.9 |
| N/A | Scatter | 13 | 0.0 |
| Total votes | | 29,509 | 100.0 |
| Democratic gain from Republican | | Swing | 5.5 |

New Hampshire's 24th Senate District, 2016
| Party | Candidate | Votes | % |
|---|---|---|---|
| Republican | Dan Innis | 17,844 | 52.1 |
| Democratic | Tom Sherman (incumbent) | 16,373 | 47.6 |
| N/A | Scatter | 19 | 0.0 |
| Total votes | | 39,233 | 100.0 |
| Republican hold | | | |

Party political offices
| Preceded by Dan Feltes | Democratic nominee for Governor of New Hampshire; 2022 | Succeeded by Joyce Craig |
