= 2016 New Hampshire gubernatorial election =

- November 8, 2016
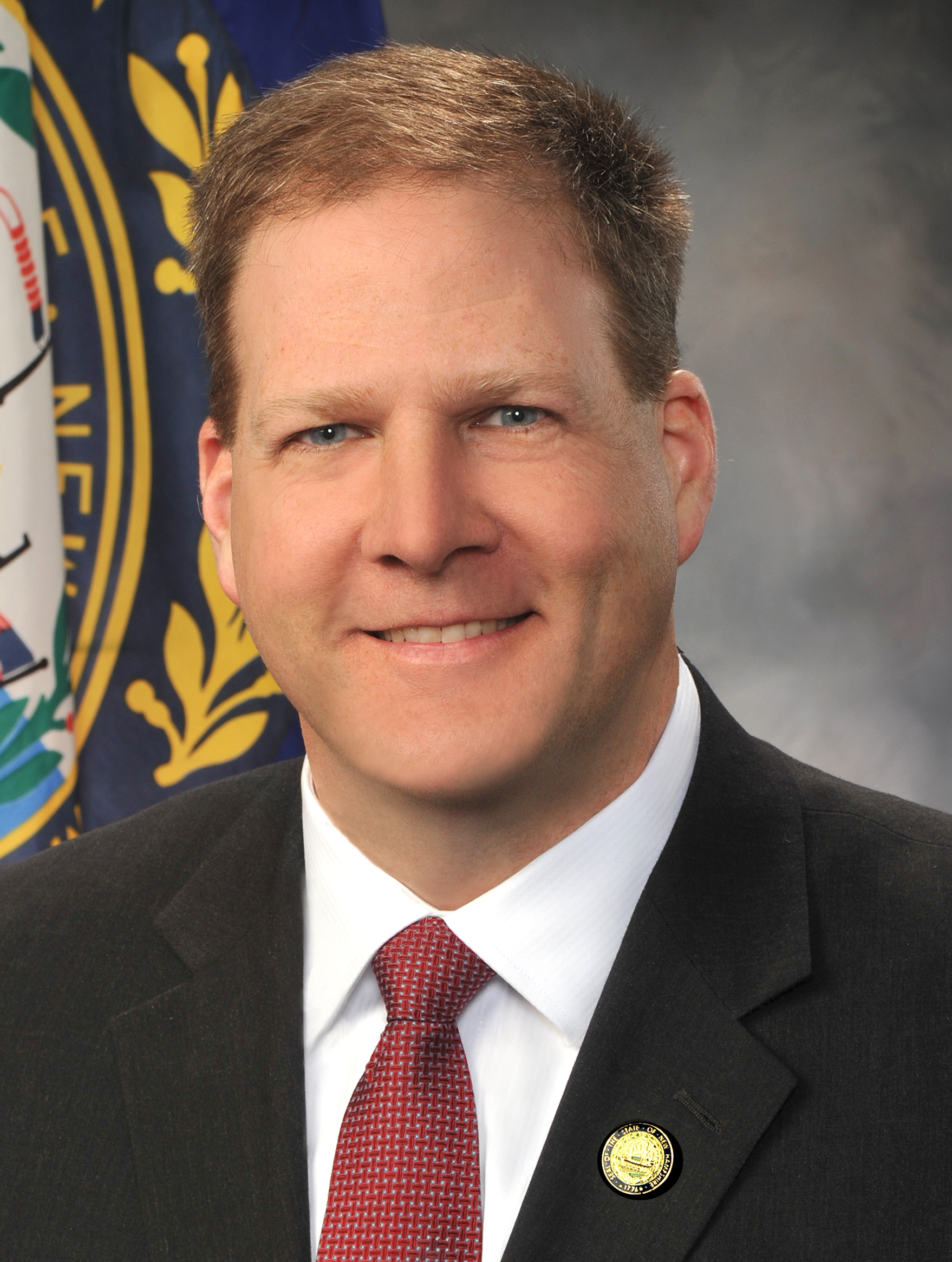

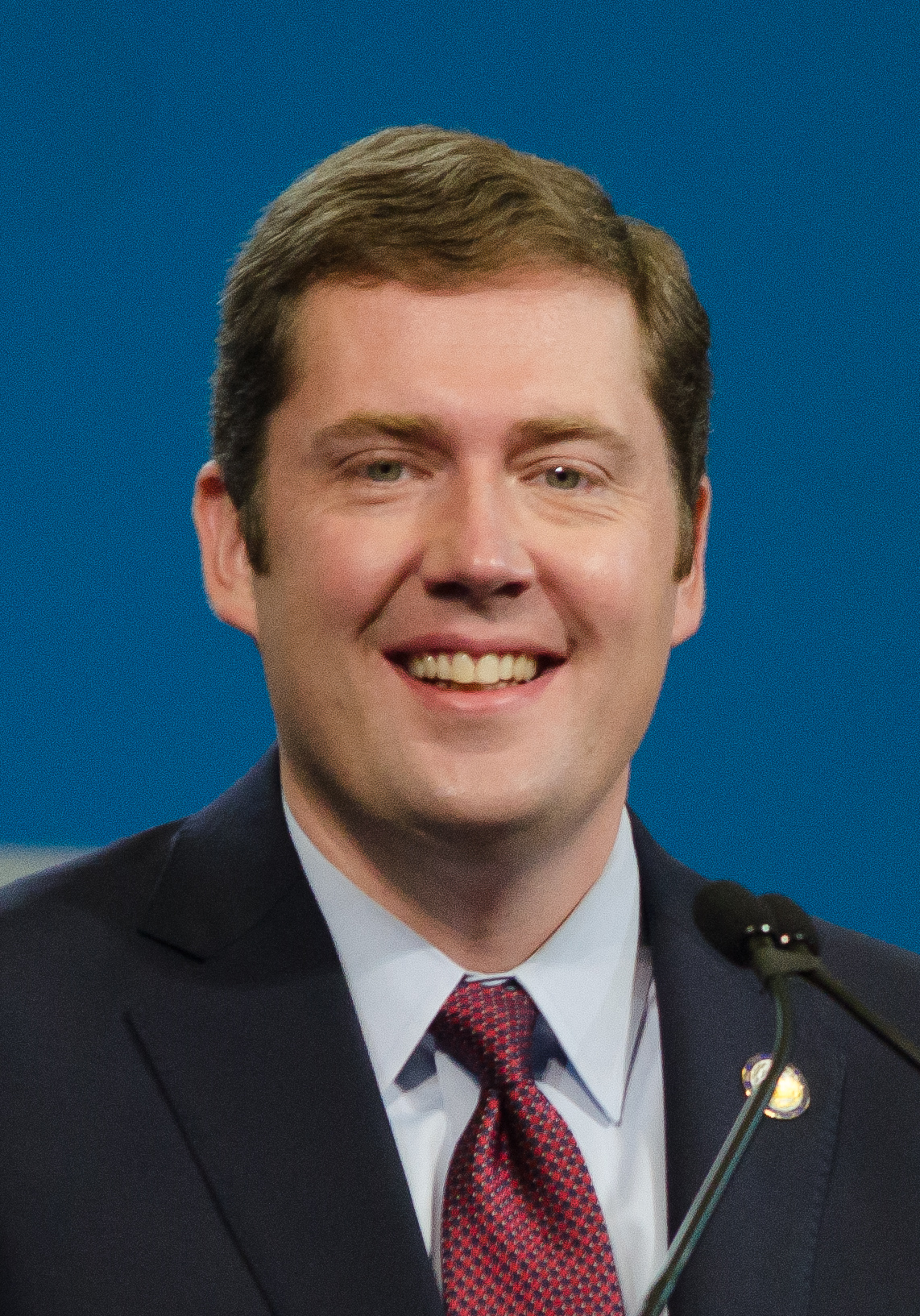
Nominee	Chris Sununu	Colin Van Ostern
Party	Republican	Democratic
Popular vote	354,040	337,589
Percentage	48.84%	46.57%
- Sununu: 40–50% 50–60% 60–70% 70–80% 80–90% Van Ostern: 40–50% 50–60% 60–70% 70–80% >90% Tie: 40–50% No votes
Governor before election
Maggie Hassan
Democratic
Elected Governor
Chris Sununu
Republican

The 2016 New Hampshire gubernatorial election took place on November 8, 2016, to elect the governor of New Hampshire, concurrently with the 2016 U.S. presidential election, as well as elections to the United States Senate, elections to the United States House of Representatives and various state and local elections.

The primaries were held on September 13.

Incumbent Democratic governor Maggie Hassan was eligible to run for re-election to a third term in office, but she instead successfully ran for the U.S. Senate against incumbent Kelly Ayotte. In the general election, Republican nominee Chris Sununu defeated Democrat Colin Van Ostern and Libertarian state representative Max Abramson to become the first Republican governor of New Hampshire elected since 2002. With a margin of 2.27%, this election was the second-closest race of the 2016 gubernatorial election cycle, behind only the election in North Carolina.

== Background ==
Governor Maggie Hassan, the incumbent from the Democratic Party, declined to run for reelection, choosing to seek a U.S. Senate seat instead. Both major parties had multiple declared candidates, leading to primary elections that were held September 13, 2016.

New Hampshire and Vermont are the only states in the country whose governors are elected every two years.

== Democratic primary ==
=== Candidates ===
==== Declared ====
- Mark Connolly, former New Hampshire Deputy Secretary of State
- Derek Dextraze
- Ian Freeman, radio host
- Steve Marchand, former mayor of Portsmouth
- Colin Van Ostern, Executive Councilor

==== Declined ====
- Jackie Cilley, state representative, former state senator and candidate for governor in 2012
- Dan Feltes, state senator
- Maggie Hassan, incumbent governor (running for U.S. Senate)
- Andrew Hosmer, state senator
- Ann McLane Kuster, U.S. representative (running for re-election)
- Shawn O'Connor, businessman (running for NH-01)
- Chris Pappas, Executive Councilor
- Stefany Shaheen, Portsmouth City Councilor and daughter of U.S. senator Jeanne Shaheen
- Carol Shea-Porter, former U.S. representative (running for NH-01)
- Donna Soucy, state senator
- Mike Vlacich, campaign manager for Senator Shaheen

=== Polling ===
Poll source	Date(s) administered	Sample size	Margin of error	Mark Connolly	Derek Dextraze	Ian Freeman	Steve Marchand	Colin Van Ostern	Other	Undecided
InsideSources/NH Journal	July 19–21, 2016	444	± 5.1%	7%	1%	3%	6%	13%	—	71%
Boston Herald/Franklin Pierce University	May 25–28, 2016	405	± 4.9%	5%	—	—	2%	12%	6%	74%
Public Policy Polling	November 30–December 2, 2015	458	± 4.6%	15%	—	—	—	21%	—	64%

=== Results ===
Results by county: Van Ostern: Van Ostern—60–70%; Van Ostern—50–60%; Van Ostern—40–50%; Van Ostern—30–40%

Democratic primary results
Party	Candidate	Votes	%
Democratic	Colin Van Ostern	37,696	51.99
Democratic	Steve Marchand	18,338	25.29
Democratic	Mark Connolly	14,840	20.47
Democratic	Ian Freeman	1,069	1.47
Democratic	Derek Dextraze	557	0.77
Total votes		72,500	100.00

== Republican primary ==
=== Candidates ===
==== Declared ====
- Frank Edelblut, state representative
- Jeanie Forrester, state senator
- Ted Gatsas, Mayor of Manchester
- John Lavoie
- Chris Sununu, Executive Councilor, son of former governor John H. Sununu and brother of former U.S. senator John E. Sununu

==== Declined ====
- Jeb Bradley, Majority Leader of the State Senate and former U.S. representative
- Walt Havenstein, businessman and nominee for governor in 2014
- Donnalee Lozeau, Mayor of Nashua
- Chuck Morse, president of the State Senate
- Andy Sanborn, state senator

=== Endorsements ===
Frank Edelblut
- 603 Alliance
- New Hampshire Liberty Alliance
- Fifty-seven current members of the New Hampshire House of Representatives: Chris Adams, Glen Aldrich, Keith Ammon, John Balcom, Steven Beaudoin, Rick Christie, James Coffey, Allen Cook, Susan Delemus, Dan Donovan, Eric Eastman, Tracy Emerick, Elizabeth Ferreira, Valerie Fraser, Harold French, Bart Fromuth, Dick Gordon, Linda Gould, Warren Groen, Joe Hannon, J.R. Hoell, Edith Hogan, Werner Horn, Ray Howard, Paul Ingbretson, Dan Itse, Tom Kaczynski, Joe Lachance, Don Lebrun, Donald McClarren, Jim McConnell, Mark McLean, Carol McGuire, Dan McGuire, Josh Moore, Bill Ohm, Jeff Oligny, Jason Parent, Joe Pitre, Katherine Prudhomme O'Brien, Kimberly Rice, Eric Schleien, Carl Seidel, Tammy Simmons, Kathleen Souza, Greg Smith, James Spillane, Victoria Sullivan, Mike Sylvia, Dan Tamburello, Len Turcotte, Jordan Ulery, Peter Varney, Michael Vose, Joshua Whitehouse, Ted Wright, Kurt Wuelper
- The Conway Daily Sun
Jeanie Forrester
- New Hampshire Union Leader
- Susan B. Anthony List
Ted Gatsas
- Jeb Bradley, New Hampshire Senate Majority Leader
- The Keene Sentinel
- Nashua Telegraph
Chris Sununu

Individuals

- Charles Bass, former U.S. representative
- Scott Brown, former United States senator from Massachusetts
- Bill Cahill, former Executive Councilor
- Louis Georgopoulos, former Executive Councilor
- Judd Gregg, former governor of New Hampshire
- Ruth Griffin, former Executive Councilor
- John Kasich, Governor of Ohio and 2016 presidential candidate
- Joseph Kenney, executive councilor
- Steve Merrill, former governor of New Hampshire
- Chuck Morse, president of the New Hampshire Senate
- Earl Rinker, former executive councilor
- Dan St. Hilaire, former executive councilor
- Raymond Wieczorek, former executive councilor

Newspapers

- Concord Monitor
- The Portsmouth Herald

=== Polling ===
Poll source	Date(s) administered	Sample size	Margin of error	Frank Edelblut	Jeannie Forrester	Ted Gatsas	Jon Lavoie	Chris Sununu	Other	Undecided
NH Journal	July 19–21, 2016	619	± 5.1%	4%	5%	21%	2%	27%	—	41%
Boston Herald/Franklin Pierce University	May 25–28, 2016	405	± 4.9%	0%	7%	10%	—	44%	3%	36%
Public Policy Polling	November 30–December 2, 2015	454	± 4.6%	12%	—	—	—	60%	—	28%

=== Results ===
Results by county: Sununu: Sununu—30–40%; Sununu—<30%; Edelblut: Edelblut—30–40%; Edelblut—40–50%; Forrester: Forrester—30–40%; Forrester—40–50%

Republican primary results
Party	Candidate	Votes	%
Republican	Chris Sununu	34,137	30.68
Republican	Frank Edelblut	33,149	29.79
Republican	Ted Gatsas	22,840	20.53
Republican	Jeanie Forrester	19,716	17.72
Republican	John Lavoie	1,429	1.28
Total votes		111,271	100.00

== Libertarian Party ==
=== Candidates ===
==== Declared ====
- Max Abramson, state representative

== Independents ==
=== Candidates ===
==== Declared ====
- Mike Gill, businessman
- Jilletta Jarvis, training project manager

== General election ==
=== Debates ===
- Complete video of debate, October 26, 2016 - C-SPAN

=== Predictions ===
Source	Ranking	As of
The Cook Political Report	Tossup	August 12, 2016
Daily Kos	Tossup	November 8, 2016
Rothenberg Political Report	Tossup	November 3, 2016
Sabato's Crystal Ball	Lean D	November 7, 2016
Real Clear Politics	Tossup	November 1, 2016
Governing	Tossup	October 27, 2016

=== Polling ===
Aggregate polls

Source of poll aggregation	Dates administered	Dates updated	Colin Van Ostern (D)	Chris Sununu (R)	Other/Undecided (Note: Calculated by taking the difference of 100% and all other candidates combined.)	Margin
Real Clear Politics	October 28 – November 6, 2016	November 6, 2016	43.2%	44.4%	12.4%	Sununu +1.2%

Poll source	Date(s) administered	Sample size	Margin of error	Colin Van Ostern (D)	Chris Sununu (R)	Other	Undecided
SurveyMonkey	November 1–7, 2016	696	± 4.6%	55%	42%	—	3%
WMUR/UNH	November 3–6, 2016	707	± 3.7%	48%	37%	2%	13%
SurveyMonkey	Oct 31–Nov 6, 2016	672	± 4.6%	56%	41%	—	3%
WMUR/UNH	November 2–5, 2016	645	± 3.7%	47%	38%	3%	12%
WMUR/UNH	November 1–4, 2016	588	± 3.7%	47%	37%	2%	14%
WMUR/UNH	Oct 31–Nov 3, 2016	515	± 3.7%	47%	37%	2%	14%
SurveyMonkey	Oct 28–Nov 3, 2016	672	± 4.6%	54%	42%	—	4%
Suffolk University	Oct 31–Nov 2, 2016	500	± 4.4%	37%	41%	6%	15%
American Research Group	Oct 31–Nov 2, 2016	600	± 4.0%	44%	48%	2%	6%
WMUR/UNH	Oct 30–Nov 2, 2016	466	± 3.7%	46%	38%	2%	14%
WBUR/MassINC	Oct 29–Nov 1, 2016	500 LV	± 4.4%	44%	49%	1%	5%
WBUR/MassINC	Oct 29–Nov 1, 2016	500 LV	± 4.4%	43%	45%	<1%	10%
UMass Lowell/7News	Oct 28–Nov 2, 2016	695 LV	± 4.3%	43%	47%	5%	4%
UMass Lowell/7News	Oct 28–Nov 2, 2016	901 RV	± 3.8%	41%	45%	5%	8%
SurveyMonkey	Oct 27–Nov 2, 2016	658	± 4.6%	54%	42%	—	4%
Public Policy Polling	Oct 31–Nov 1, 2016	781	± 3.5%	47%	44%	—	9%
WMUR/UNH	Oct 29–Nov 1, 2016	468	± 3.7%	43%	40%	3%	14%
WBUR/MassINC	Oct 29–Nov 1, 2016	500	± 4.4%	44%	49%	1%	5%
WBUR/MassINC	Oct 29–Nov 1, 2016	500	± 4.4%	43%	45%	—	10%
SurveyMonkey	Oct 26–Nov 1, 2016	635	± 4.6%	53%	43%	—	4%
WMUR/UNH	October 28–31, 2016	513	± 3.7%	44%	40%	2%	14%
SurveyMonkey	October 25–31, 2016	659	± 4.6%	53%	43%	—	4%
WMUR/UNH	October 27–30, 2016	463	± 3.7%	43%	40%	2%	14%
WMUR/UNH	October 26–30, 2016	641	± 3.9%	43%	40%	2%	14%
WMUR/UNH	October 26–29, 2016	516	± 3.7%	42%	41%	5%	12%
NH Journal	October 26–28, 2016	408	± 4.2%	42%	45%	2%	11%
Monmouth University	October 22–25, 2016	401	± 4.9%	48%	43%	4%	5%
NBC/WSJ/Marist	October 20–24, 2016	768 LV	± 3.5%	47%	46%	2%	4%
NBC/WSJ/Marist	October 20–24, 2016	1,020 RV	± 3.1%	47%	46%	2%	5%
UMass Amherst/WBZ	October 17–21, 2016	772	± 4.5%	44%	43%	6%	7%
UMass Amherst/WBZ	October 17–21, 2016	772	± 4.5%	42%	39%	5%	14%
WMUR/UNH	October 11–17, 2016	770	± 3.5%	44%	38%	4%	15%
Washington Post/SurveyMonkey	October 8–16, 2016	569	± 0.5%	53%	43%	—	4%
WBUR/MassINC	October 10–12, 2016	501	± 4.4%	47%	44%	2%	8%
WBUR/MassINC	October 10–12, 2016	501	± 4.4%	41%	41%	2%	15%
7News/UMass Lowell	October 7–11, 2016	517	± 4.9%	39%	41%	6%	13%
Suffolk University	October 3–5, 2016	500	± 4.4%	36%	40%	2%	20%
Greenberg Quinlan Rosner - Save the Children Action Network	Sept 29–Oct 4, 2016	500	± 4.3%	44%	44%	6%	6%
WBUR/MassINC	September 27–29, 2016	502	± 4.4%	44%	47%	2%	7%
WBUR/MassINC	September 27–29, 2016	502	± 4.4%	41%	44%	2%	11%
American Research Group	September 20–25, 2016	522	± 4.2%	44%	45%	1%	10%
Monmouth University	September 17–20, 2016	400	± 4.9%	43%	49%	1%	7%
Public Policy Polling	January 4–6, 2016	1,036	± 3.0%	35%	39%	—	26%
Public Policy Polling	November 30–December 2, 2015	990	± 3.1%	34%	40%	—	25%
Public Policy Polling	October 16–18, 2015	880	± 3.3%	34%	41%	—	25%
Public Policy Polling	August 21–24, 2015	841	± 3.4%	32%	39%	—	29%
WMUR/UNH	July 7–20, 2015	472	± 4.5%	26%	36%	—	37%
Public Policy Polling	April 9–13, 2015	747	± 3.6%	34%	37%	—	29%

Hypothetical polling

with Maggie Hassan

Poll source	Date(s) administered	Sample size	Margin of error	Maggie Hassan (D)	Jeb Bradley (R)	Other	Undecided
Public Policy Polling	August 21–24, 2015	841	± 3.4%	48%	39%	—	13%
Public Policy Polling	April 9–13, 2015	747	± 3.6%	53%	36%	—	11%

Poll source	Date(s) administered	Sample size	Margin of error	Maggie Hassan (D)	Donnalee Lozeau (R)	Other	Undecided
Public Policy Polling	April 9–13, 2015	747	± 3.6%	55%	25%	—	20%

Poll source	Date(s) administered	Sample size	Margin of error	Maggie Hassan (D)	Chris Sununu (R)	Other	Undecided
Public Policy Polling	August 21–24, 2015	841	± 3.4%	48%	41%	—	11%
Public Policy Polling	April 9–13, 2015	747	± 3.6%	52%	35%	—	13%

with Stefany Shaheen

Poll source	Date(s) administered	Sample size	Margin of error	Stefany Shaheen (D)	Jeb Bradley (R)	Other	Undecided
Public Policy Polling	October 16–18, 2015	880	± 3.3%	37%	39%	—	23%

with Chris Pappas

Poll source	Date(s) administered	Sample size	Margin of error	Chris Pappas (D)	Jeb Bradley (R)	Other	Undecided
Public Policy Polling	August 21–24, 2015	841	± 3.4%	33%	38%	—	29%

Poll source	Date(s) administered	Sample size	Margin of error	Chris Pappas (D)	Chris Sununu (R)	Other	Undecided
Public Policy Polling	August 21–24, 2015	841	± 3.4%	34%	38%	—	28%

with Terie Norelli

Poll source	Date(s) administered	Sample size	Margin of error	Terie Norelli (D)	Jeb Bradley (R)	Other	Undecided
Public Policy Polling	August 21–24, 2015	841	± 3.4%	33%	39%	—	29%

Poll source	Date(s) administered	Sample size	Margin of error	Terie Norelli (D)	Chris Sununu (R)	Other	Undecided
Public Policy Polling	August 21–24, 2015	841	± 3.4%	34%	39%	—	27%

with Mark Connolly

Poll source	Date(s) administered	Sample size	Margin of error	Mark Connolly (D)	Frank Edelblut (R)	Other	Undecided
Public Policy Polling	January 4–6, 2016	1,036	± 3%	31%	24%	—	45%
Public Policy Polling	November 30–December 2, 2015	990	± 3.1%	33%	24%	—	43%

Poll source	Date(s) administered	Sample size	Margin of error	Mark Connolly (D)	Chris Sununu (R)	Other	Undecided
Public Policy Polling	January 4–6, 2016	1,036	± 3%	36%	38%	—	25%
Public Policy Polling	November 30–December 2, 2015	990	± 3.1%	36%	40%	—	24%

Poll source	Date(s) administered	Sample size	Margin of error	Stefany Shaheen (D)	Chris Sununu (R)	Other	Undecided
Public Policy Polling	October 16–18, 2015	880	± 3.3%	40%	41%	—	19%

with Jackie Cilley

Poll source	Date(s) administered	Sample size	Margin of error	Jackie Cilley (D)	Jeb Bradley (R)	Other	Undecided
Public Policy Polling	April 9–13, 2015	747	± 3.6%	31%	37%	—	31%

Poll source	Date(s) administered	Sample size	Margin of error	Jackie Cilley (D)	Donnalee Lozeau (R)	Other	Undecided
Public Policy Polling	April 9–13, 2015	747	± 3.6%	32%	26%	—	43%

Poll source	Date(s) administered	Sample size	Margin of error	Jackie Cilley (D)	Chris Sununu (R)	Other	Undecided
Public Policy Polling	April 9–13, 2015	747	± 3.6%	36%	37%	—	27%

Poll source	Date(s) administered	Sample size	Margin of error	Colin Van Ostern (D)	Frank Edelblut (R)	Other	Undecided
Public Policy Polling	January 4–6, 2016	1,036	± 3%	30%	25%	—	45%
Public Policy Polling	November 30–December 2, 2015	990	± 3.1%	30%	26%	—	44%

Poll source	Date(s) administered	Sample size	Margin of error	Colin Van Ostern (D)	Jeb Bradley (R)	Other	Undecided
Public Policy Polling	October 16–18, 2015	880	± 3.3%	31%	40%	—	29%
Public Policy Polling	August 21–24, 2015	841	± 3.4%	31%	38%	—	31%
Public Policy Polling	April 9–13, 2015	747	± 3.6%	31%	37%	—	32%

Poll source	Date(s) administered	Sample size	Margin of error	Colin Van Ostern (D)	Donnalee Lozeau (R)	Other	Undecided
Public Policy Polling	April 9–13, 2015	747	± 3.6%	31%	27%	—	42%

=== Results ===
2016 New Hampshire gubernatorial election
Party	Candidate	Votes	%	±%
Republican	Chris Sununu	354,040	48.84%	+1.41%
Democratic	Colin Van Ostern	337,589	46.57%	−5.81%
Libertarian	Max Abramson	31,243	4.31%	N/A
Write-in		1,991	0.28%	+0.09%
Total votes		724,863	100.00%	N/A
Republican gain from Democratic				

==== By county ====
County	Sununu#	Sununu%	Van Ostern#	Van Ostern%	Abramson#	Abramson%	Scatter#	Scatter%	Total votes	Margin
Belknap	18,798	54.70%	14,069	40.94%	1,403	4.08%	94	0.00%	34,364	13.76%
Carroll	15,192	52.38%	12,503	43.29%	1,126	3.90%	58	0.00%	28,879	9.09%
Cheshire	17,107	42.25%	21,471	53.02%	1,802	4.45%	114	0.00%	40,494	-10.77%
Coos	7,424	48.90%	7,006	46.14%	702	4.62%	51	0.00%	15,183	2.76%
Grafton	19,685	39.65%	27,621	55.64%	2,215	4.46%	122	0.00%	49,643	-15.99%
Hillsborough	103,811	49.70%	95,231	45.59%	9,128	4.37%	698	0.00%	208,868	4.11%
Merrimack	37,295	45.51%	41,195	50.26%	3,245	3.96%	222	0.00%	81,957	-4.75%
Rockingham	94,385	53.52%	74,076	42.00%	7,499	4.25%	411	0.00%	176,371	11.52%
Strafford	29,578	44.12%	34,173	50.97%	3,128	4.67%	164	0.00%	67,043	-6.85%
Sullivan	10,765	48.80%	10,244	46.43%	995	4.51%	57	0.00%	22,061	2.37%

Counties that flipped from Democratic to Republican

- Carroll (largest city: Conway)
- Coös (largest city: Berlin)
- Sullivan (largest city: Claremont)

==== By congressional district ====
Sununu won one of the two congressional districts, which elected a Democrat.

District	Sununu	Van Ostern	Representative
1st	50%	45%	Carol Shea-Porter
2nd	47%	48%	Annie Kuster
