= 2016 United States Senate election in New Hampshire =

- November 8, 2016
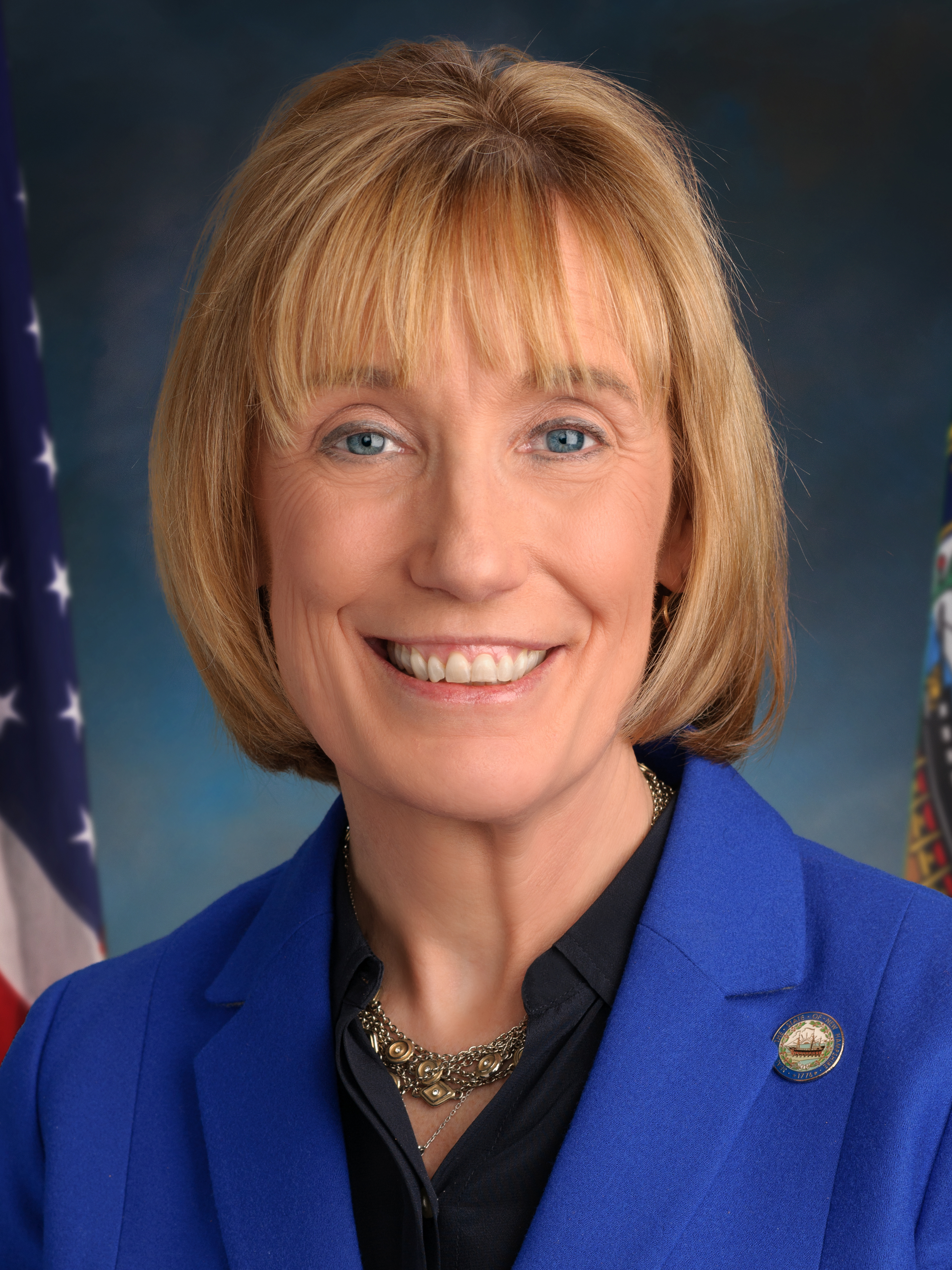

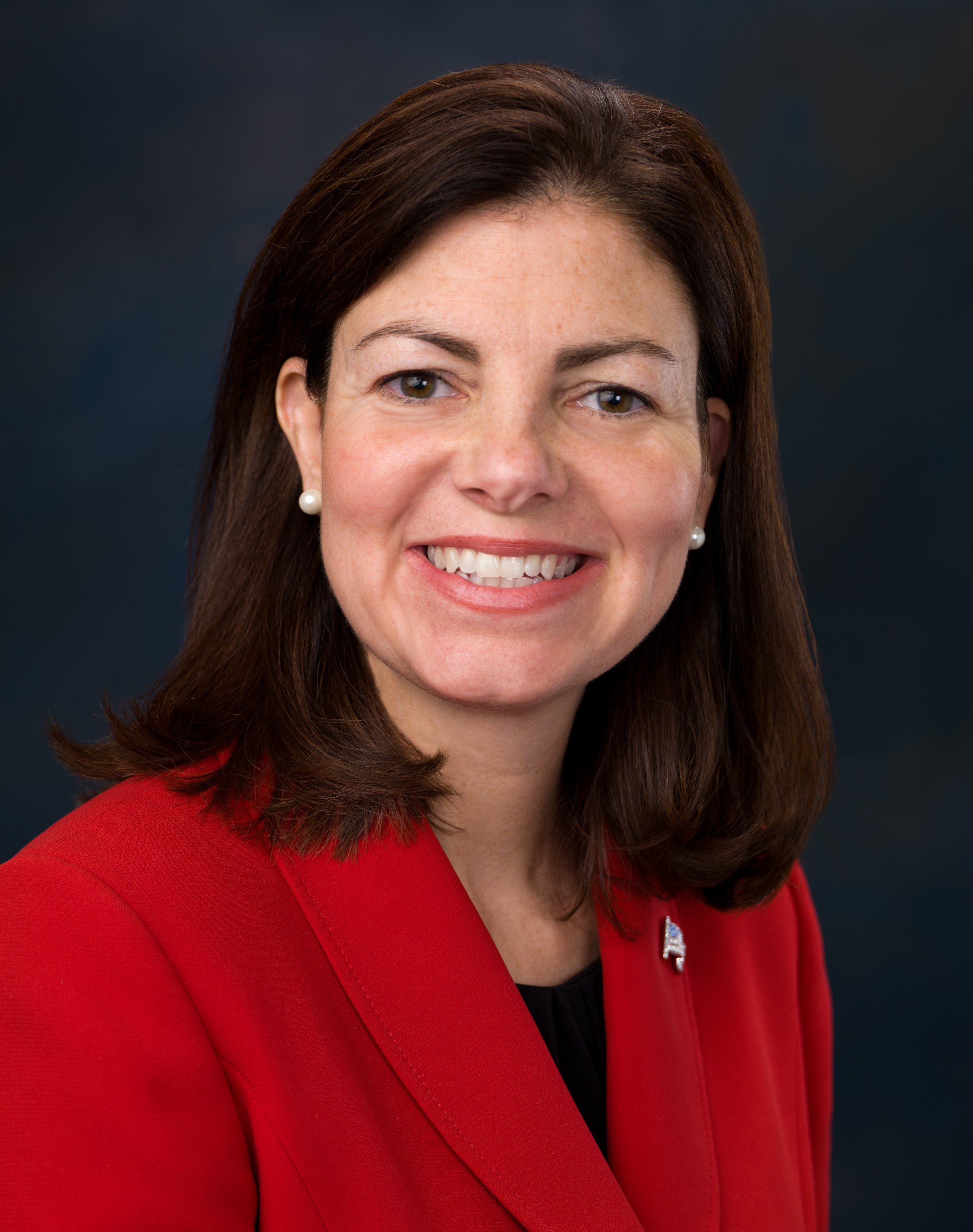
Nominee	Maggie Hassan	Kelly Ayotte
Party	Democratic	Republican
Popular vote	354,649	353,632
Percentage	47.98%	47.84%
- Hassan: 40–50% 50–60% 60–70% 70–80% >90% Ayotte: 40–50% 50–60% 60–70% 70–80% Tie: 50% No votes
U.S. senator before election
Kelly Ayotte
Republican
Elected U.S. Senator
Maggie Hassan
Democratic

The 2016 United States Senate election in New Hampshire was held on November 8, 2016, to elect a member of the United States Senate to represent the State of New Hampshire, concurrently with the 2016 U.S. presidential election, as well as other elections to the United States Senate in other states, elections to the United States House of Representatives, and various state and local elections. The primary election to select the candidates who appeared on the general election ballot took place on September 13, 2016.

Incumbent Republican Senator Kelly Ayotte ran for re-election to a second term in office, and won the primary by a wide margin. Governor Maggie Hassan chose not to seek re-election to a third term as governor, and instead sought the nomination of the Democratic Party for the Senate. Hassan was unopposed in the Democratic primary and won the general election by 1,017 votes, representing a winning margin of approximately 0.14%. This made the election the closest race of the 2016 Senate election cycle, and also the closest race in a New Hampshire Senate election since the disputed 1974–75 election. Hassan became the first Democratic senator elected in this seat since the latter election and only the second since 1932, when a Democrat had last won a full term to this seat.

The Democratic Party also flipped New Hampshire's 1st congressional district in the concurrent House election, thus marking the first time since 1854 that New Hampshire had an entirely Democratic congressional delegation. To date, this remains the last time that a Democratic candidate for Senate in New Hampshire has failed to win a majority of the vote or lost any county other than Belknap and Coös, and the last New Hampshire U.S. Senate race where the incumbent was defeated. Hassan was sworn in on January 3, 2017, marking the first time since 1979 that Democrats simultaneously held both of New Hampshire's Senate seats.

== Republican primary ==
Ayotte was predicted to face opposition in the primary from a Tea Party candidate. In October 2013, former New Hampshire Republican State Committee Chairman Jack Kimball said: "There is no question in my mind that she will garner a primary challenger". Ultimately, she faced only token opposition and won the primary with more than 78% of the vote.

=== Candidates ===
==== Nominee ====
- Kelly Ayotte, incumbent U.S. senator

==== Eliminated in primary ====
- Tom Alciere
- Gerald Beloin, perennial candidate
- Stanley Emanuel
- Jim Rubens, former state senator, candidate for governor in 1998 and candidate for U.S. Senate in 2014

==== Declined ====
- Andrew Hemingway, businessman and candidate for governor in 2014
- Ovide Lamontagne, attorney, candidate for the U.S. Senate in 2010 and nominee for governor in 1996 and 2012
- Bill O'Brien, state representative and former speaker of the New Hampshire House of Representatives

=== Polling ===
Hypothetical polling

Poll source	Date(s) administered	Sample size	Margin of error	Kelly Ayotte	Ovide Lamontagne	Other	Undecided
Public Policy Polling	April 9–13, 2015	358	± ?	57%	32%	—	12%

=== Results ===
Republican primary results
Party	Candidate	Votes	%
Republican	Kelly Ayotte (incumbent)	86,676	78.56%
Republican	Jim Rubens	19,156	17.36%
Republican	Tom Alciere	1,586	1.44%
Republican	Gerald Beloin	1,255	1.14%
Republican	Stanley Emanuel	1,187	1.08%
Democratic	Maggie Hassan (write-in)	301	0.27%
Write-in		167	0.15%
Total votes		110,328	100.0%

== Democratic primary ==
=== Candidates ===
==== Nominee ====
- Maggie Hassan, governor of New Hampshire

==== Declined ====
- Mark Connolly, former deputy secretary of state and director of securities regulation (running for governor)
- Paul Hodes, former U.S. representative and 2010 nominee
- Ann McLane Kuster, U.S. representative (running for re-election)
- John Lynch, former governor of New Hampshire
- Shawn O'Connor, businessman (running for NH-01)
- Carol Shea-Porter, former U.S. representative (running for NH-01)
- Colin Van Ostern, executive councilor (running for governor)

=== Results ===
Democratic primary results
Party	Candidate	Votes	%
Democratic	Maggie Hassan	70,374	98.16%
Republican	Kelly Ayotte (incumbent) (write-in)	775	1.08%
Write-in		547	0.76%
Total votes		71,696	100.0%

== Libertarian convention ==
On Saturday, January 16, 2016, the Libertarian Party of New Hampshire selected Brian Chabot as their nominee for the U.S. Senate.

== General election ==
=== Candidates ===
- Kelly Ayotte (R), incumbent senator
- Brian Chabot (L)
- Aaron Day (I), former chairman of the Free State Project and conservative activist
- Maggie Hassan (D), governor of New Hampshire

=== Debates ===
Dates	Location	Ayotte	Hassan	Link
September 30, 2016	North Conway, New Hampshire	Participant	Participant	
October 14, 2016	Manchester, New Hampshire	Participant	Participant	
October 27, 2016	Concord, New Hampshire	Participant	Participant	
November 2, 2016	Manchester, New Hampshire	Participant	Participant	

=== Endorsements ===
Kelly Ayotte

Presidents

- George W. Bush, 43rd president of the United States

Governors (current and former)

- Mike Pence, Indiana and 2016 vice presidential nominee
- Mitt Romney, Massachusetts (former), 2008 presidential candidate and 2012 presidential nominee

U.S. senators

- Shelley Moore Capito, West Virginia
- John Cornyn, Texas and Senate Majority Whip
- Ted Cruz, Texas and 2016 presidential candidate
- Joni Ernst, Iowa
- Deb Fischer, Nebraska
- Lindsey Graham, South Carolina and 2016 presidential candidate

State legislators

- Shawn Jasper, speaker of the New Hampshire House of Representatives
- Chuck Morse, president of the New Hampshire Senate
- Stephen Stepanek, state representative
- Bill Zeliff, former state representative

Individuals

- John R. Bolton, former United States Ambassador to the United Nations
- Andrew Hemingway, businessman, Tea Party activist and candidate for chairman of the New Hampshire Republican State Committee in 2013
- Ovide Lamontagne, attorney, nominee for governor in 1996 and 2012 and candidate for the U.S. Senate in 2010
- Donald Trump, chairman and CEO of The Trump Organization and 2016 presidential nominee

Organizations

- Manchester Police Patrolman's Association
- National Federation of Independent Business
- National Republican Senatorial Committee
- New England Narcotics Enforcement Officers Association
- New Hampshire Troopers Association
- Republican Party of New Hampshire
- United States Chamber of Commerce

Newspapers

- The Caledonian-Record
- The Conway Daily Sun
- The Eagle-Tribune
- Nashua Telegraph
- New Hampshire Union Leader
- The Portsmouth Herald
Maggie Hassan

Presidents

- Barack Obama, 44th president of the United States

Vice presidents

- Joe Biden, 47th vice president of the United States

U.S. cabinet members and cabinet-level officials

- Hillary Clinton, 67th United States Secretary of State, 2008 presidential candidate and 2016 presidential nominee

Governors

- John Lynch, New Hampshire (former)

U.S. senators

- Barbara Boxer, California
- Dick Durbin, Illinois
- Kirsten Gillibrand, New York
- Martin Heinrich, New Mexico
- Mazie Hirono, Hawaii
- Jeff Merkley, Oregon
- Chris Murphy, Connecticut
- Gary Peters, Michigan
- Bernie Sanders, Vermont and 2016 presidential candidate
- Jeanne Shaheen, New Hampshire
- Jon Tester, Montana
- Elizabeth Warren, Massachusetts

U.S. representatives

- Gabby Giffords, Arizona (former)

Individuals

- Michael Bloomberg, former mayor of New York and CEO of Bloomberg L.P.
- Debra Messing, actress
- Michelle Obama, 44th First Lady of the United States
- Jodi Picoult, novelist

Labor Unions

- AFSCME
- American Federation of Government Employees
- American Federation of Teachers - New Hampshire

Organizations

- Alliance for Retired Americans
- American Nurses Association
- Americans for Responsible Solutions
- Daily Kos
- Democratic Senatorial Campaign Committee
- EMILY's List
- Friends of the Earth Action
- Human Rights Campaign
- National Committee to Preserve Social Security and Medicare
- National Organization for Women
- Planned Parenthood
- Portsmouth Naval Shipyard
- Professional Firefighters of New Hampshire
- Sierra Club

Newspapers

- The Boston Globe
- The Concord Monitor
- The New York Times

=== Predictions ===
Source	Ranking	As of
The Cook Political Report	Tossup	November 2, 2016
Inside Elections	Tossup	November 3, 2016
Sabato's Crystal Ball	Lean D (flip)	November 7, 2016
Daily Kos	Lean D (flip)	November 8, 2016
Real Clear Politics	Tossup	November 7, 2016

=== Polling ===
View source data.

Poll source	Date(s) administered	Sample size	Margin of error	Kelly Ayotte (R)	Maggie Hassan (D)	Other	Undecided
SurveyMonkey	November 1–7, 2016	696	± 4.6%	42%	51%	6%	1%
WMUR/UNH	November 3–6, 2016	707	± 3.7%	45%	49%	1%	4%
SurveyMonkey	October 31 – November 6, 2016	672	± 4.6%	41%	50%	7%	2%
Emerson College	November 4–5, 2016	1,000	± 3.0%	49%	46%	5%	1%
WMUR/UNH	November 2–5, 2016	645	± 3.7%	45%	47%	2%	6%
WMUR/UNH	November 1–4, 2016	588	± 3.7%	44%	48%	2%	6%
WMUR/UNH	October 31 – November 3, 2016	515	± 3.7%	42%	48%	3%	7%
SurveyMonkey	October 28 – November 3, 2016	672	± 4.6%	38%	50%	9%	3%
Breitbart/Gravis Marketing	November 1–2, 2016	1,001	± 2.0%	46%	44%	—	10%
Suffolk University	October 31 – November 2, 2016	500	± 4.4%	44%	42%	5%	8%
American Research Group	October 31 – November 2, 2016	600	± 4.0%	49%	46%	2%	3%
WMUR/UNH	October 30 – November 2, 2016	466	± 3.7%	41%	48%	3%	8%
UMass Lowell/7News	October 28 – November 2, 2016	695 LV	± 4.3%	46%	47%	5%	3%
UMass Lowell/7News	October 28 – November 2, 2016	901 RV	± 3.8%	43%	46%	5%	6%
SurveyMonkey	October 27 – November 2, 2016	658	± 4.6%	37%	50%	10%	3%
Public Policy Polling	October 31 – November 1, 2016	781	± 3.5%	45%	48%	—	7%
WMUR/UNH	October 29 – November 1, 2016	468	± 3.7%	43%	47%	2%	8%
WBUR/MassINC	October 29 – November 1, 2016	500	± 4.4%	51%	45%	1%	3%
WBUR/MassINC	October 29 – November 1, 2016	500	± 4.4%	48%	43%	—	6%
SurveyMonkey	October 26 – November 1, 2016	635	± 4.6%	38%	50%	9%	3%
WMUR/UNH	October 28–31, 2016	513	± 3.7%	44%	46%	2%	8%
SurveyMonkey	October 25–31, 2016	659	± 4.6%	38%	50%	8%	4%
WMUR/UNH	October 27–30, 2016	463	± 3.7%	45%	45%	2%	8%
WMUR/UNH	October 26–30, 2016	641	± 3.9%	44%	46%	3%	8%
WMUR/UNH	October 26–29, 2016	516	± 3.7%	44%	45%	3%	8%
InsideSources/NH Journal	October 26–28, 2016	408	± 4.2%	49%	47%	—	4%
Emerson College	October 23–25, 2016	600	± 3.9%	50%	44%	6%	1%
Monmouth University	October 22–25, 2016	401	± 4.9%	46%	46%	6%	2%
NBC/WSJ/Marist	October 20–24, 2016	768 LV	± 3.5%	48%	47%	2%	2%
NBC/WSJ/Marist	October 20–24, 2016	1,020 RV	± 3.1%	48%	47%	2%	3%
UMass Amherst/WBZ	October 17–21, 2016	772	± 4.5%	48%	44%	4%	4%
UMass Amherst/WBZ	October 17–21, 2016	772	± 4.5%	46%	43%	4%	8%
Emerson College	October 17–19, 2016	900	± 3.2%	45%	45%	10%	1%
WMUR/UNH	October 11–17, 2016	770	± 3.5%	39%	48%	4%	9%
Washington Post/SurveyMonkey	October 8–16, 2016	569	± 0.5%	42%	47%	10%	1%
WBUR/MassINC	October 10–12, 2016	501	± 4.4%	47%	47%	2%	5%
WBUR/MassINC	October 10–12, 2016	501	± 4.4%	46%	45%	2%	6%
7News/UMass Lowell	October 7–11, 2016	517	± 4.9%	45%	44%	4%	5%
Public Policy Polling	October 7–9, 2016	600	± 4.0%	43%	44%	—	13%
Suffolk University	October 3–5, 2016	500	± 4.4%	47%	41%	4%	6%
WBUR/MassINC	September 27–29, 2016	502	± 4.4%	45%	48%	3%	4%
WBUR/MassINC	September 27–29, 2016	502	± 4.4%	46%	48%	3%	3%
GBA Strategies	September 25–27, 2016	600	± 4.0%	44%	47%	7%	2%
GBA Strategies	September 25–27, 2016	600	± 4.0%	47%	49%	—	4%
American Research Group	September 20–25, 2016	522	± 4.2%	47%	47%	—	6%
Monmouth University	September 17–20, 2016	400	± 4.9%	47%	45%	2%	5%
NBC/WSJ/Marist	September 6–8, 2016	737	± 3.6%	52%	44%	—	4%
Emerson College	September 3–5, 2016	600	± 3.9%	48%	46%	—	6%
Public Policy Polling	August 30–31, 2016	585	± 4.1%	44%	47%	—	9%
Public Policy Polling	August 26–28, 2016	977	± 3.0%	45%	47%	—	8%
WMUR/UNH	August 20–28, 2016	433	± 4.7%	42%	44%	3%	12%
CBS News/YouGov	August 10–12, 2016	990	± 4.3%	41%	42%	—	17%
Vox Populi Polling (R)	August 7–8, 2016	820	± 3.4%	43%	46%	—	11%
Public Policy Polling	August 5–7, 2016	802	± 3.5%	42%	47%	—	11%
WBUR/MassINC	July 29 – August 1, 2016	609	± 4.0%	40%	50%	2%	7%
WBUR/MassINC	July 29 – August 1, 2016	609	± 4.0%	37%	48%	2%	11%
GBA Strategies	July 25–27, 2016	600	± 4.0%	47%	47%	2%	4%
InsideSources/NH Journal	July 19–21, 2016	1,166	± 5.1%	49%	41%	—	10%
WMUR/UNH	July 9–18, 2016	469	± 4.5%	42%	45%	3%	11%
American Research Group	June 24–28, 2016	533	± 4.2%	51%	42%	—	7%
Public Policy Polling	June 22–23, 2016	578	± 4.1%	42%	44%	—	15%
Global Strategy Group	June 15–16, 2016	400	± 4.9%	45%	49%	—	6%
Greenberg Quinlan Rosner - Democracy Corps	June 11–20, 2016	300	± 5.7%	46%	47%	—	7%
Public Policy Polling	June 8–9, 2016	649	± 3.9%	44%	47%	—	8%
Boston Herald/Franklin Pierce University	May 25–28, 2016	405	± 4.9%	48%	47%	—	5%
Global Strategy Group	May 25–26, 2016	400	± 4.9%	43%	45%	—	12%
WBUR/MassINC	May 12–15, 2016	501	± 4.4%	46%	48%	2%	4%
Dartmouth College	April 11–16, 2016	362	± 5.2%	37%	35%	—	28%
WMUR/UNH	April 7–17, 2016	553	± 4.2%	43%	42%	—	15%
WMUR/UNH	February 20–28, 2016	628	± 3.7%	45%	41%	4%	10%
Marist Poll	January 28, 2016	2,258	± 2.1%	45%	40%	—	15%
Public Policy Polling	January 4–6, 2016	1,036	± 3.0%	44%	42%	—	14%
Public Policy Polling	November 30 – December 2, 2015	990	± 3.1%	42%	42%	—	16%
Public Policy Polling	October 16–18, 2015	880	± 3.3%	43%	44%	—	13%
Gravis Marketing	October 5–6, 2015	1,035	± 3.1%	52%	42%	—	6%
WMUR/UNH	September 21 – October 2, 2015	519	± 4.3%	45%	43%	1%	11%
Public Policy Polling	August 21–24, 2015	841	± 3.4%	44%	43%	—	13%
NBC News/Marist Poll	July, 2015	910	± 3.2%	50%	42%	—	8%
WMUR/UNH	July 7–20, 2015	472	± 4.5%	47%	41%	1%	12%
The Tarrance Group	July 5–6, 2015	600	± 4.0%	51%	44%	—	5%
Fabrizio, Lee and Associates	June 25–28, 2015	500	± 3.0%	52%	41%	—	7%
WMUR/UNH	May 6–22, 2015	524	± 4.3%	45%	43%	2%	9%
Gravis Marketing	April 21–22, 2015	1,117	± 3.0%	51%	43%	—	6%
Public Policy Polling	April 9–13, 2015	747	± 3.6%	45%	46%	—	9%
Gravis Marketing	March 18–19, 2015	1,110	± 5.0%	47%	45%	—	8%
Public Opinion Strategies	February 17–18, 2015	424	± 4.7%	46%	45%	—	9%
NBC News/Marist	February 3–10, 2015	887	± 3.3%	44%	48%	—	7%
New England College	December 1, 2014	541	± 4.2%	48%	43%	4%	5%
Public Policy Polling	January 9–12, 2014	1,354	± 2.7%	46%	40%	—	14%
Public Policy Polling	September 13–16, 2013	1,038	± 3.0%	45%	44%	—	11%
Public Policy Polling	April 19–21, 2013	933	± 3.2%	44%	46%	—	10%

Hypothetical polling

with Kelly Ayotte

Poll source	Date(s) administered	Sample size	Margin of error	Kelly Ayotte (R)	Ann McLane Kuster (D)	Undecided
Public Policy Polling	April 9–13, 2015	747	± 3.6%	49%	38%	13%

Poll source	Date(s) administered	Sample size	Margin of error	Kelly Ayotte (R)	Chris Pappas (D)	Undecided
Public Policy Polling	August 21–24, 2015	841	± 3.4%	45%	31%	24%

with Jim Rubens

Poll source	Date(s) administered	Sample size	Margin of error	Jim Rubens (R)	Maggie Hassan (D)	Other	Undecided
WMUR/UNH	August 20–28, 2016	433	± 4.7%	27%	51%	8%	14%
WMUR/UNH	July 9–18, 2016	469	± 4.2%	30%	48%	6%	16%
WMUR/UNH	April 7–17, 2016	553	± 4.2%	30%	46%	—	24%

with Ovide Lamontagne

Poll source	Date(s) administered	Sample size	Margin of error	Ovide Lamontagne (R)	Maggie Hassan (D)	Undecided
Public Policy Polling	April 9–13, 2015	747	± 3.6%	35%	54%	11%

Poll source	Date(s) administered	Sample size	Margin of error	Ovide Lamontagne (R)	Ann McLane Kuster (D)	Undecided
Public Policy Polling	April 9–13, 2015	747	± 3.6%	39%	43%	18%

=== Fundraising ===
Candidate (party)	Receipts	Disbursements	Cash on hand	Debt
Maggie Hassan (D)	$18,698,223.00	$18,564,772.00	$133,450.00	$0
Kelly Ayotte (R)	$16,409,753.89	$16,197,583.64	$134,182.99	$0
Source: Federal Election Commission

=== Results ===

United States Senate election in New Hampshire, 2016
Party	Candidate	Votes	%	±%
Democratic	Maggie Hassan	354,649	47.98%	+11.13%
Republican	Kelly Ayotte (incumbent)	353,632	47.84%	−12.25%
Independent	Aaron Day	17,742	2.40%	N/A
Libertarian	Brian Chabot	12,597	1.70%	+0.66%
Write-in		520	0.07%	N/A
Total votes		739,140	100.00%	N/A
Democratic gain from Republican				

Aftermath

This was Ayotte's only defeat of her electoral career. Making a political comeback in 2024, she won that year's New Hampshire gubernatorial election.

==== By county ====
2016 Senate election results in New Hampshire (by county)
County	Maggie Hassan Democratic		Kelly Ayotte Republican		Other votes	
	#	%	#	%	#	%
Belknap	14,743	42.32%	18,710	53.71%	1,383	3.97%
Carroll	13,431	45.76%	14,838	50.56%	1,079	3.67%
Cheshire	22,809	55.0%	16,741	40.37%	1,922	4.64%
Coös	7,340	47.38%	7,539	48.66%	614	3.97%
Grafton	28,127	55.35%	20,679	40.69%	2,015	3.96%
Hillsborough	98,727	46.34%	105,156	49.36%	9,170	4.31%
Merrimack	41,412	49.9%	38,450	46.44%	3,030	3.65%
Rockingham	81,343	45.13%	91,361	50.69%	7,546	4.19%
Strafford	36,023	52.63%	29,419	42.98%	3,000	4.38%
Sullivan	10,694	47.65%	10,649	47.45%	1,100	4.9%

Counties that flipped from Republican to Democratic

- Cheshire (largest city: Keene)
- Grafton (largest city: Lebanon)
- Merrimack (largest city: Concord)
- Strafford (largest city: Dover)
- Sullivan (largest city: Claremont)

State senate district results

==== By congressional district ====
Hassan won one of the two congressional districts, and Ayotte won the other that also elected a Democrat.

District	Ayotte	Hassan	Representative
1st	49%	47%	Carol Shea-Porter
2nd	47%	49%	Annie Kuster

== Allegations of voting irregularities ==
In February 2017, President Donald Trump (who had endorsed Ayotte) told a gathering of senators at the White House that fraudulent out-of-state voting had cost him and Ayotte the election in New Hampshire. On September 7, state House speaker Shawn Jasper (who also had endorsed Ayotte) alleged that voter fraud had swung the election. He made the allegations based on a report by the New Hampshire House of Representatives saying that of the 6,540 voters who had registered to vote on election day, only 1,014 had obtained a New Hampshire driver's license by August 30 of the following year. The Washington Post was able to quickly contact three such voters who said that they were college students and had kept the driver's license from their home state.

Several investigations by New Hampshire's Ballot Law Commission found no evidence of widespread fraud, and only four total instances of fraud in the state for the 2016 elections. Specifically addressing the claim of people being bussed in from out of state to vote, Associate Attorney General Anne Edwards noted that they found no evidence for such claims. When they investigated these claims, they found that the buses were chartered out of state, but the voters on the buses lived in New Hampshire and could legally vote there.

== See also ==
- United States Senate elections, 2016
