= 2020 United States presidential election in New Hampshire =

- November 3, 2020
- Turnout: 73.5%

Nominee	Joe Biden	Donald Trump
Party	Democratic	Republican
Home state	Delaware	Florida
Running mate	Kamala Harris	Mike Pence
Electoral vote	4	0
Popular vote	424,937	365,660
Percentage	52.71%	45.36%

Biden
40–50%
50–60%
60–70%
70–80%
80–90%
90–100%
Trump
40–50%
50–60%
60–70%
70–80%
Tie/No data
40–50%
President before election
Donald Trump
Republican
Elected President
Joe Biden
Democratic

The 2020 United States presidential election in New Hampshire was held on Tuesday, November 3, 2020, as part of the 2020 United States presidential election in which all 50 states and the District of Columbia participated. New Hampshire voters chose electors to represent them in the Electoral College via a popular vote, pitting the Republican Party's nominees, incumbent President Donald Trump and Vice President Mike Pence, against the Democratic Party's nominees, former Vice President Joe Biden and his running mate, Senator Kamala Harris. New Hampshire has four electoral votes in the Electoral College.

New Hampshire is by far the most fiscally conservative state in New England, and its population has a strong disdain for taxes, historically giving Republicans an edge in its state office elections. However, like the rest of the region, it is very liberal on social issues like abortion and gay rights, and thus the Democratic Party has dominated in its federal elections in recent years. Although the state came extremely close to voting for Trump in 2016, polls throughout the 2020 campaign showed a clear Biden lead, and prior to election day, all 14 news organizations considered New Hampshire a state that Biden was favored to win.

Per exit polls by the Associated Press, Biden prevailed in the state by garnering the votes of 58% of white women, and 69% of unmarried women. Biden carried voters prioritizing healthcare policy with 73% campaigning on protecting coverage for pre-existing conditions, a resonant issue in a state plagued by the opioid crisis.

Corresponding Democratic victories in the Senate election and both House elections reaffirmed the Democrats' strength in what used to be a heavily contested battleground. Despite that, on the same ballot, incumbent Republican Governor Chris Sununu won his third term with more than 65% of the vote, and Republicans regained control of both of New Hampshire's state legislative chambers and the state's Executive Council. Biden's best margin was in the socially liberal Connecticut River Valley, which had overwhelmingly favored Bernie Sanders in the Democratic primary, while Trump's strength came in the rural Great North Woods Region. Biden was the first Democrat to ever win the White House without Coös County.

== Primary elections ==
The New Hampshire primary, traditionally the first, was held on February 11, 2020, roughly a week after the Iowa caucuses.

=== Republican primary ===
The New Hampshire Republican primary took place on February 11, 2020. Incumbent president Donald Trump won the Republican primary with 85.6 percent of the vote, clinching all of the state's 22 pledged delegates to the 2020 Republican National Convention. Typically, the top candidates of the other major party receive a large number of write-in votes.

County won by these popular vote results:
Trump—85–90%
Trump—80–85%

Congressional district won by these popular vote results:
Trump—80–85%

2020 New Hampshire Republican primary
Candidate	Votes	%	Estimated delegates
Donald Trump (incumbent)	129,734	84.42	22
Bill Weld	13,844	9.01	0
Joe Walsh (withdrawn)	838	0.55	0
Mitt Romney (write-in)	632	0.41	0
Rocky De La Fuente	148	0.10	0
Robert Ardini	77	0.05	0
Bob Ely	68	0.04	0
Zoltan Istvan	56	0.04	0
Others / Write-in	2,339	1.52	0
Pete Buttigieg (write-in Democratic)	1,136	0.74	0
Amy Klobuchar (write-in Democratic)	1,076	0.70	0
Mike Bloomberg (write-in Democratic)	801	0.52	0
Bernie Sanders (write-in Democratic)	753	0.49	0
Tulsi Gabbard (write-in Democratic)	369	0.24	0
Joe Biden (write-in Democratic)	330	0.21	0
Tom Steyer (write-in Democratic)	191	0.12	0
Andrew Yang (write-in Democratic)	162	0.11	0
Elizabeth Warren (write-in Democratic)	157	0.10	0
Other write-in Democrats	963	0.63	0
Total	153,674	100%	22

=== Democratic primary ===
Bernie Sanders won the Democratic primary with 25.6 percent of the vote, ahead of second-place Pete Buttigieg, who received 24.3 percent of the vote. Both Sanders and Buttigieg received nine delegates to the 2020 Democratic National Convention. Amy Klobuchar finished in third place with 19.7 percent of the vote and earned six delegates. Elizabeth Warren and Joe Biden finished in fourth and fifth place, respectively, and each received zero delegates.

Popular vote share by county
Sanders—<30%
Sanders—30–40%
Buttigieg—<30%

Popular vote share by congressional district
Sanders—25–30%

2020 New Hampshire Democratic presidential primary
Candidate	Votes	%	Delegates
Bernie Sanders	76,384	25.60	9
Pete Buttigieg	72,454	24.28	9
Amy Klobuchar	58,714	19.68	6
Elizabeth Warren	27,429	9.19	
Joe Biden	24,944	8.36	
Tom Steyer	10,732	3.60	
Tulsi Gabbard	9,755	3.27	
Andrew Yang	8,312	2.79	
Michael Bloomberg (write-in)	4,675	1.57	
Deval Patrick	1,271	0.43	
Michael Bennet	952	0.32	
Cory Booker (withdrawn)	157	0.05	
Joe Sestak (withdrawn)	152	0.05	
Kamala Harris (withdrawn)	129	0.04	
Marianne Williamson (withdrawn)	99	0.03	
Julian Castro (withdrawn)	83	0.03	
John Delaney (withdrawn)	83	0.03	
Steve Bullock (withdrawn)	64	0.02	
Henry Hewes	43	0.01	
Ben Gleib (withdrawn)	31	0.01	
Other candidates / Write-in	(Note: Including 157 write-in votes)665	0.22	
Donald Trump (write-in Republican)	1,217	0.41	
Bill Weld (write-in Republican)	17	0.01	
Mitt Romney (write-in Republican)	10	0.00	
Other write-in Republicans	5	0.00	
Total	298,377	100%	24

=== Libertarian primary ===
2020 New Hampshire Libertarian presidential primary
- January 11, 2020
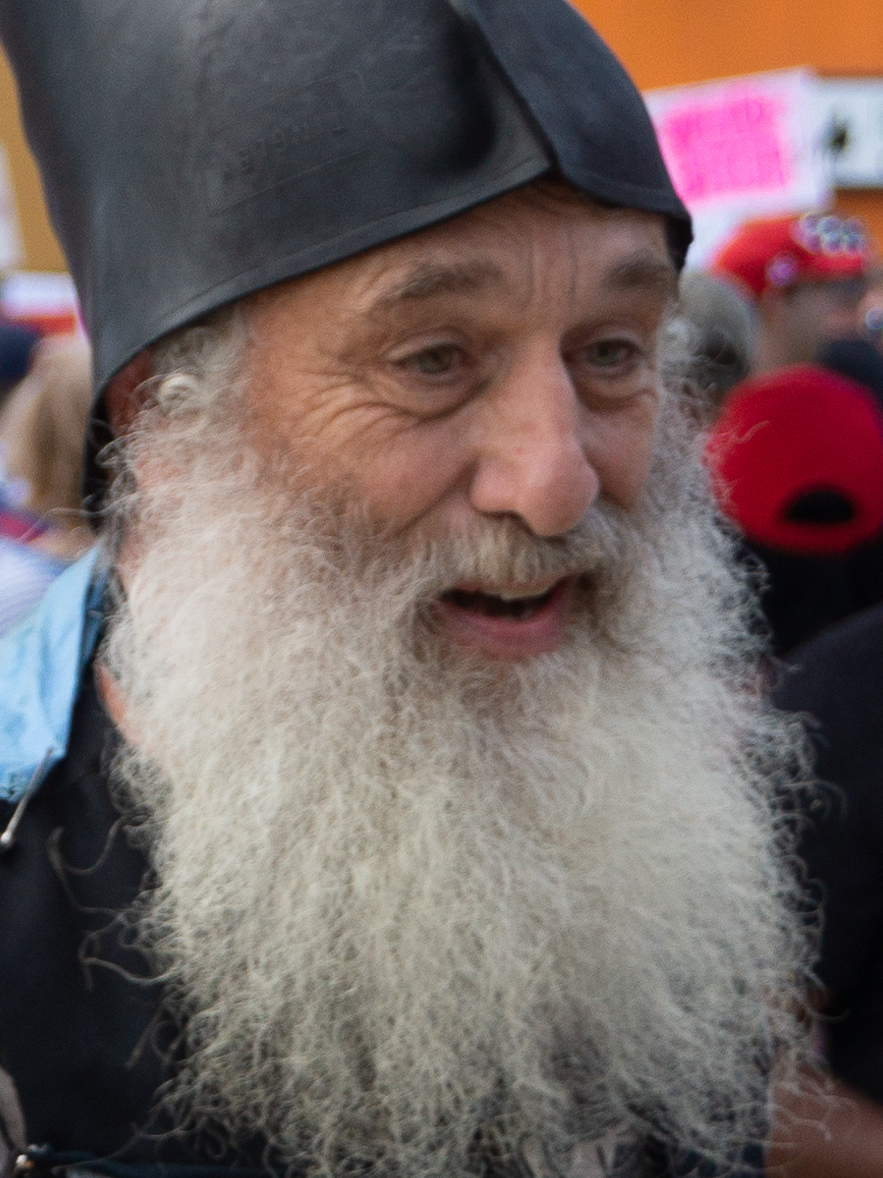

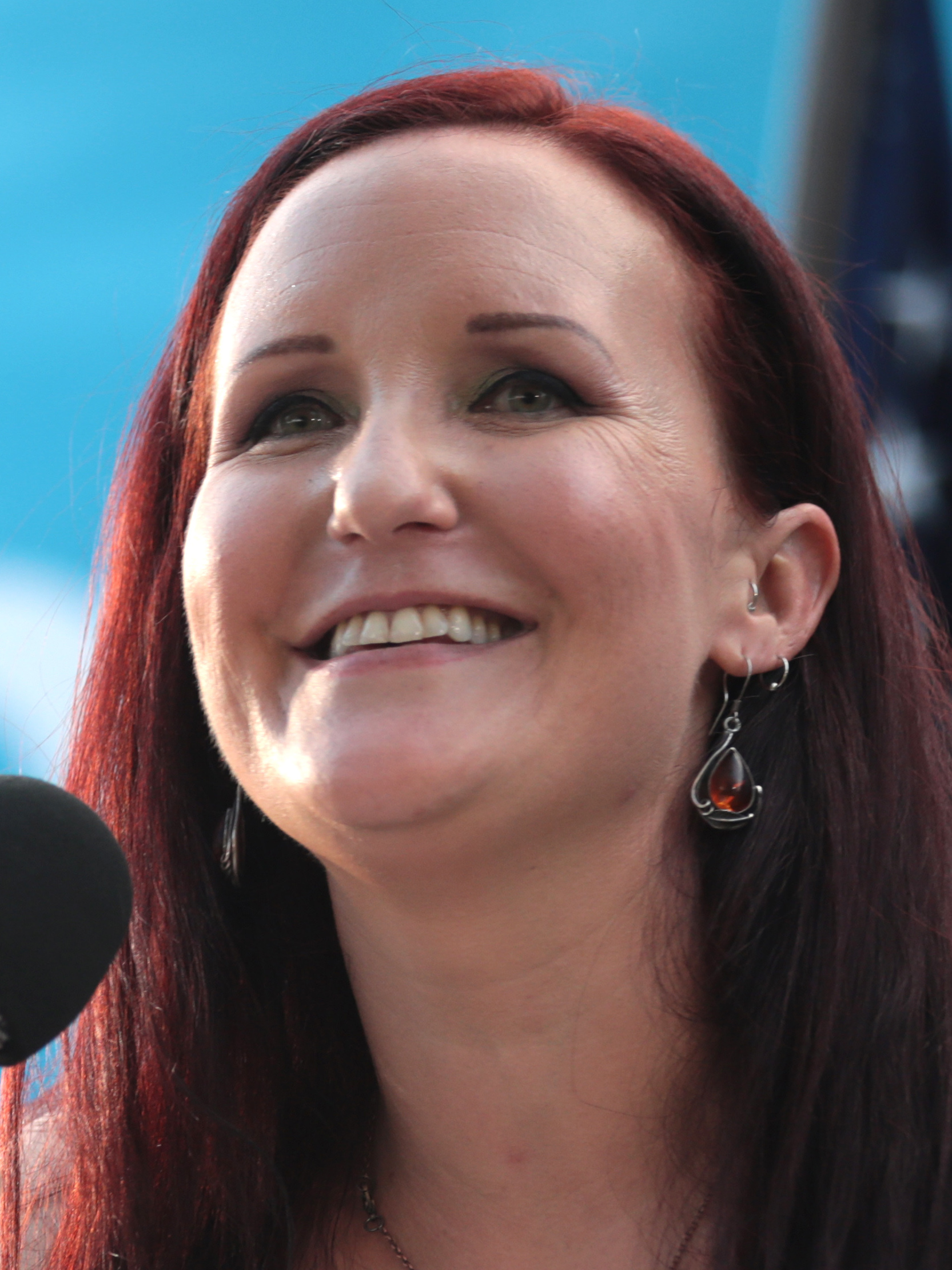

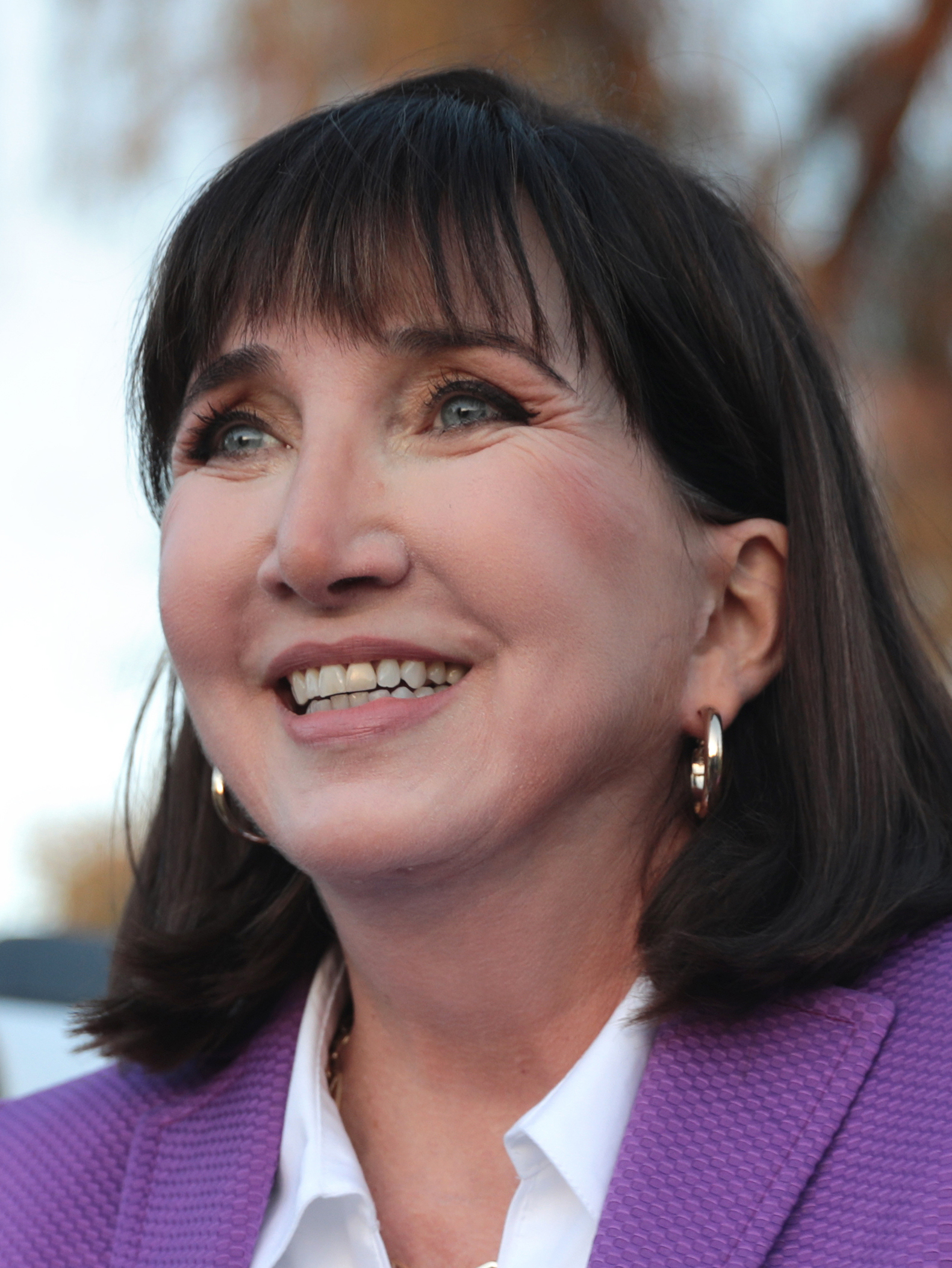

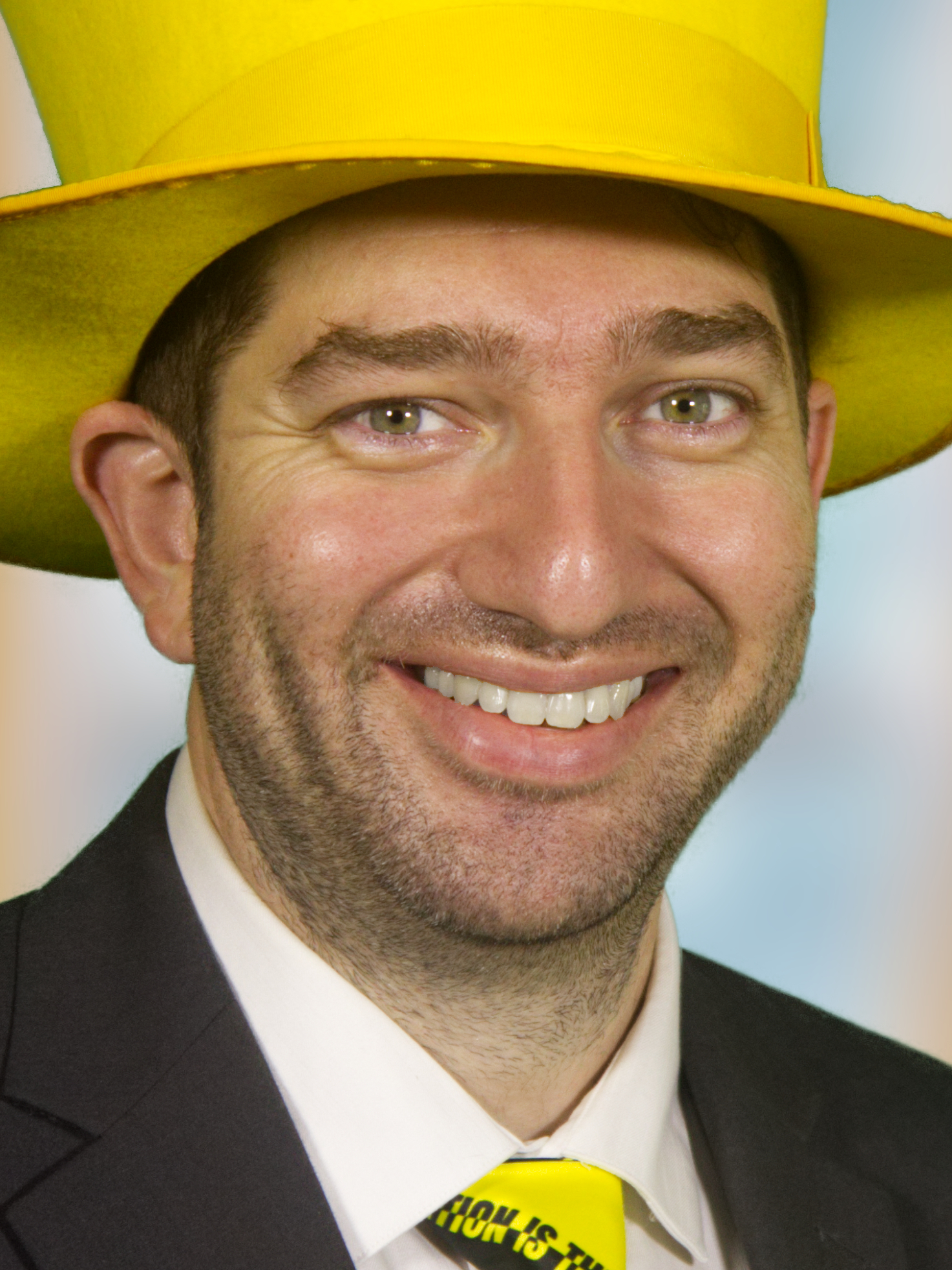

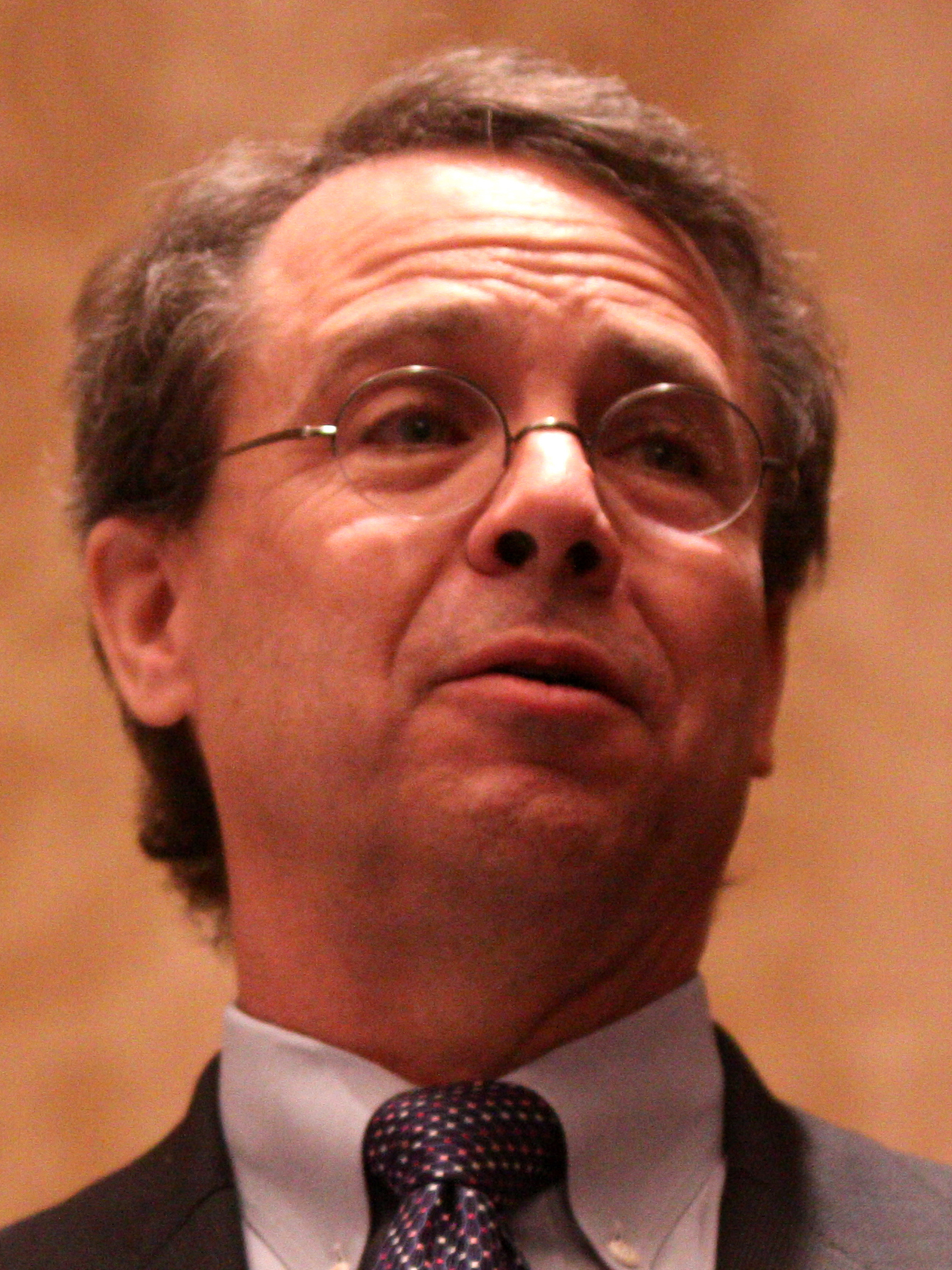

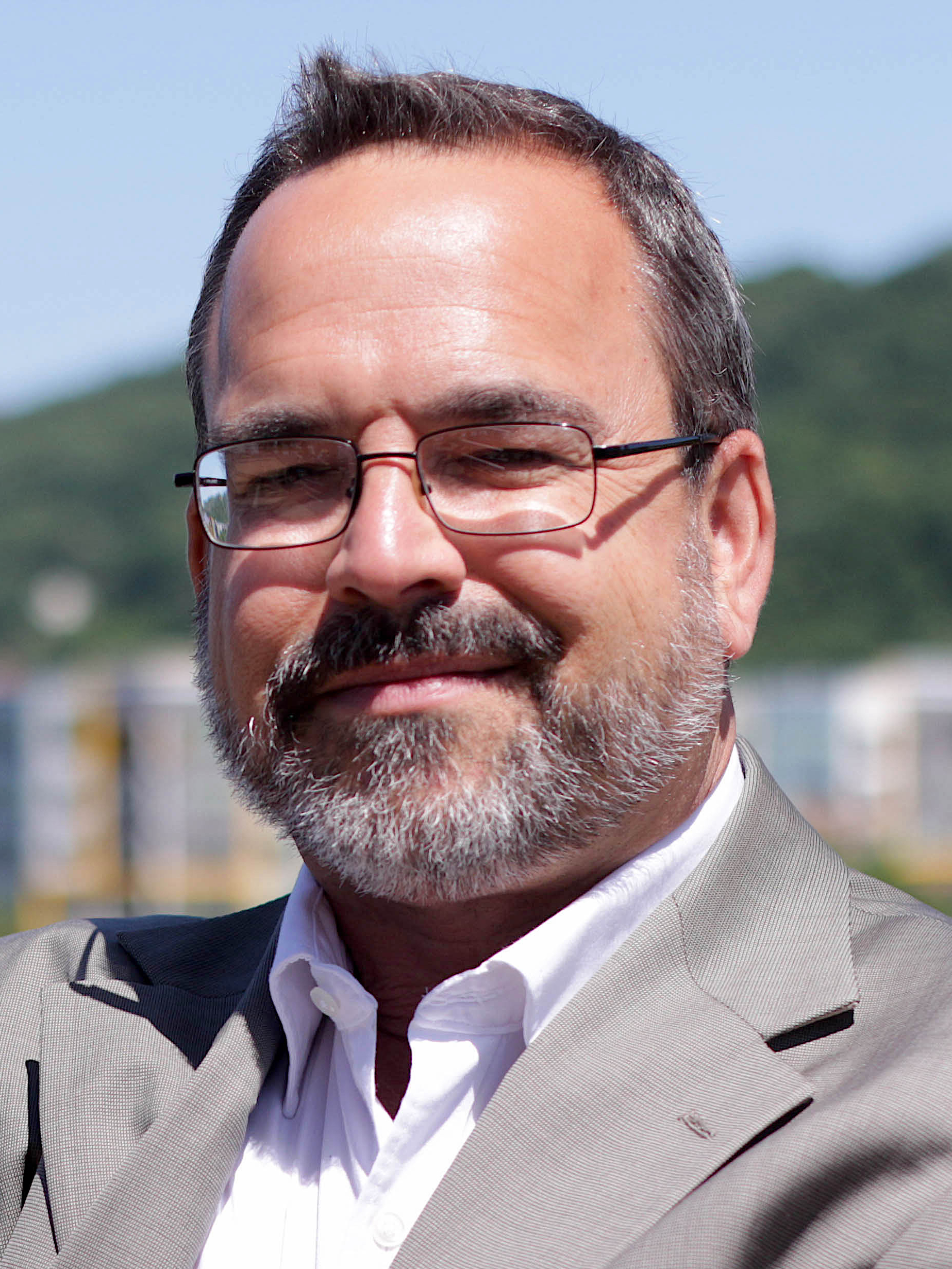
Candidate	Vermin Supreme	Kim Ruff	Jo Jorgensen
Home state	Massachusetts	Arizona	South Carolina
Popular vote	26	22	17
Percentage	17.3%	14.7%	11.3%
Candidate	None of the above	Dan Behrman	Jacob Hornberger (write-in)
Home state	N/A	Nevada	Virginia
Popular vote	13	13	9
Percentage	8.7%	8.7%	6.0%
Candidate	Sam Robb
Home state	Pennsylvania
Popular vote	8
Percentage	5.3%

Mail-in ballots were due by January 11, at the state convention. The primary was tabulated using Bucklin voting. Percentages shown are percentage of ballots cast.

2020 New Hampshire Libertarian presidential primary
Candidate	1st	2nd	3rd	Total	Percentage
Vermin Supreme	10	3	13	26	17.3%
Kim Ruff	6	9	7	22	14.7%
Jo Jorgensen	5	8	4	17	11.3%
None of the Above (NOTA)	4	6	3	13	8.7%
Dan "Taxation Is Theft" Behrman	0	6	7	13	8.7%
Jacob Hornberger (write-in)	9	0	0	9	6.0%
Sam Robb	1	2	5	8	5.3%
Mark Whitney (write-in)	4	0	2	6	4.0%
Arvin Vohra	1	0	5	6	4.0%
Ken Armstrong	0	2	3	5	3.3%
Lincoln Chafee (write-in)	1	2	1	4	2.7%
Justin Amash (write-in)	1	1	1	3	2.0%
Keenan Wallace Dunham	0	0	2	2	1.3%
Max Abramson	1	0	0	1	nil
Straw Poll (write-in)	1	0	0	1	nil
Joe Bishop-Henchman (write-in)	0	0	1	1	nil
Thomas Knapp (write-in)	0	0	1	1	nil
Adam Kokesh (write-in)	0	0	1	1	nil
Nicholas Sarwark (write-in)	0	0	1	1	nil
Exhausted Ballots/Undervotes	0	5	5	10	
Total	44	44	62	150	

2020 New Hampshire Libertarian vice presidential primary
Candidate	1st	2nd	Total	Percentage
John Phillips	15	6	21	63.6%
None of the Above	9	6	15	45.5%
Spike Cohen (write-in)	2	0	2	6.1%
Larry Sharpe (write-in)	2	0	2	6.1%
Ron Paul (write-in)	1	1	2	6.1%
Darryl W Perry (write-in)	1	0	1	3.0%
Straw Poll (write-in)	1	0	1	3.0%
Nicolas Sarwark (write-in)	1	0	1	3.0%
Mark Whitney (write-in)	1	0	1	3.0%
Exhausted Ballots/Undervotes	11	20	31	
Total	44	33	77	

== General election ==
=== Final predictions ===
Source	Ranking
The Cook Political Report	Lean D
Inside Elections	Likely D
Sabato's Crystal Ball	Likely D
Politico	Lean D
RCP	Lean D
Niskanen	Safe D
CNN	Lean D
The Economist	Likely D
CBS News	Lean D
270towin	Lean D
ABC News	Lean D
NPR	Likely D
NBC News	Lean D
538	Likely D

=== Polling ===
==== Graphical summary ====
View source data.

==== Aggregate polls ====
Source of poll aggregation	Dates administered	Dates updated	Joe Biden Democratic	Donald Trump Republican	Other/ Undecided (Note: Calculated by taking the difference of 100% and all other candidates combined.)	Margin
270 to Win	October 14–29, 2020	November 3, 2020	53.4%	42.4%	4.2%	Biden +11.0
FiveThirtyEight	until November 2, 2020	November 3, 2020	53.9%	42.8%	3.3%	Biden +11.1
Average			53.7%	42.6%	3.8%	Biden +11.1

==== Polls ====
Poll source	Date(s) administered	Sample size (Note: Key: A – all adults RV – registered voters LV – likely voters V – unclear)	Margin of error	Donald Trump Republican	Joe Biden Democratic	Jo Jorgensen Libertarian	Other	Undecided
SurveyMonkey/Axios	Oct 20 – Nov 2, 2020	1,013 (LV)	± 4.5%	45% (Note: Overlapping sample with the previous SurveyMonkey/Axios poll, but more information available regarding sample size)	54%	-	–	–
American Research Group	Oct 26–28, 2020	600 (LV)	± 4%	39%	58%	1%	–	2%
University of New Hampshire	Oct 24–28, 2020	864 (LV)	± 3.3%	45%	53%	1%	1%	1%
SurveyMonkey/Axios	Oct 1–28, 2020	1,791 (LV)	–	44%	55%	-	–	–
Saint Anselm College	Oct 23–26, 2020	1,018 (LV)	± 3.1%	44%	52%	2%	–	2%
YouGov/UMass Amherst	Oct 16–26, 2020	757 (LV)	± 4.5%	43%	53%	2%	1% (Note: "Another candidate" with 1%)	2%
University of New Hampshire	Oct 9–12, 2020	899 (LV)	± 3.3%	43%	55%	0%	0% (Note: "Another candidate" with 0%)	2%
Suffolk University/Boston Globe	Oct 8–12, 2020	500 (LV)	± 4.4%	41%	51%	2%	3% (Note: "Refused" with 2%; "Other" with 1%)	5%
Saint Anselm College	Oct 1–4, 2020	1,147 (LV)	± 2.9%	41%	53%	-	4% (Note: "Someone else" with 4%)	2%
Emerson College	Sep 30 – Oct 1, 2020	700 (LV)	± 3.6%	45% (Note: With voters who lean towards a given candidate)	53%	-	2% (Note: "Someone else" with 2%)	–
SurveyMonkey/Axios	Sep 1–30, 2020	637 (LV)	–	43%	55%	-	–	2%
American Research Group	Sep 25–28, 2020	600 (LV)	± 4%	44%	53%	1%	–	2%
University of New Hampshire	Sep 24–28, 2020	972 (LV)	± 3.1%	44%	53%	1%	0%	3%
Pulse Opinion Research/Center for American Greatness (Note: The Center for American Greatness is a pro-Trump organization)	Sep 23–25, 2020	850 (LV)	± 4%	42%	56%	-	1% (Note: "Some other candidate" with 1%)	1%
YouGov/UMass Lowell	Sep 17–25, 2020	657 (LV)	± 4.6%	44% (Note: Standard VI response)	52%	1%	2% (Note: Hawkins (G) with 2%; "Another candidate" with 0%)	1%
YouGov/UMass Lowell	Sep 17–25, 2020	657 (LV)	± 4.6%	44% (Note: With only Biden, Trump and "Another candidate" as options)	53%	-	0%	1%
Siena College/NYT Upshot	Sep 8–11, 2020	445 (LV)	± 5.5%	42%	45%	4%	2% (Note: "Someone else" and would not vote with 1%)	7% (Note: Includes "Refused")
SurveyMonkey/Axios	Aug 1–31, 2020	444 (LV)	–	39%	60%	-	–	1%
Saint Anselm College	Aug 15–17, 2020	1,042 (RV)	± 3.0%	43%	51%	-	4%	2%
SurveyMonkey/Axios	Jul 1–31, 2020	574 (LV)	–	39%	60%	-	–	2%
University of New Hampshire	Jul 16–28, 2020	1,893 (LV)	± 2.3%	40%	53%	-	4% (Note: "Another candidate" with 4%)	3%
SurveyMonkey/Axios	Jun 8–30, 2020	191 (LV)	–	39%	61%	-	–	1%
University of New Hampshire	Jun 18–22, 2020	936 (LV)	–	39%	52%	-	6% (Note: "Another candidate" with 6%)	3%
Saint Anselm College	Jun 13–16, 2020	1,072 (RV)	± 3%	42%	49%	-	5%	3%
University of New Hampshire	May 14–18, 2020	790 (LV)	–	46%	44%	-	5% (Note: "Another candidate" with 5%)	5%
Saint Anselm College	Apr 23–27, 2020	820 (RV)	± 3.4%	42%	50%	-	2%	7%
University of New Hampshire	Feb 19–25, 2020	569 (LV)	± 4.1%	46%	44%	-	8% (Note: "Another candidate" with 8%)	2%
AtlasIntel	Feb 8–10, 2020	1,100 (RV)	± 3%	46%	44%	-	11%	–
McLaughlin & Associates/NH Journal	Feb 4–5, 2020	400 (LV)	± 4.9%	49% (Note: Data sourced from FiveThirtyEight)	45%	-	– (Note: Data not yet released)	–
Marist College/NBC News	Jan 20–23, 2020	2,223 (RV)	± 2.6%	43%	51%	-	2%	5%
Emerson College	Nov 23–26, 2019	637 (RV)	± 3.8%	48%	52%	-	–	–
Emerson College	Nov 23–26, 2019	547 (RV)	± 4.1%	42%	46%	-	–	13%
Saint Anselm College	Nov 13–18, 2019	512 (RV)	± 4.3%	43%	51%	-	–	6%
Emerson College	Sep 6–9, 2019	1,041 (RV)	± 3.0%	45%	55%	-	–	–
Gravis Marketing	Aug 2–6, 2019	505 (RV)	± 4.4%	40%	53%	-	–	7%
Emerson College	Feb 21–22, 2019	910 (RV)	± 3.2%	45%	55%	-	–	–
American Research Group	Mar 21–27, 2018	1,365 (RV)	± 3.0%	39%	53%	-	–	8%

Former candidates

Donald Trump vs. Bernie Sanders

Poll source	Date(s) administered	Sample size	Margin of error	Donald Trump (R)	Bernie Sanders (D)	Other	Undecided
University of New Hampshire	Feb 19–25, 2020	571 (LV)	± 4.1%	46%	46%	6%	1%
AtlasIntel	Feb 8–10, 2020	1,100 (RV)	± 3%	47%	44%	9%	–
McLaughlin & Associates/NH Journal	Feb 4–5, 2020	400 (LV)	± 4.9%	48%	45%	–	–
Marist College/NBC News	Jan 20–23, 2020	2,223 (RV)	± 2.6%	43%	51%	2%	4%
Emerson College	Nov 23–26, 2019	637 (RV)	± 3.8%	48%	52%	–	–
Emerson College	Nov 23–26, 2019	547 (RV)	± 4.1%	42%	49%	–	9%
Saint Anselm College	Nov 13–18, 2019	512 (RV)	± 4.3%	46%	49%	–	6%
Emerson College	Sep 6–9, 2019	1,041 (RV)	± 3.0%	48%	53%	–	–
Gravis Marketing	Aug 2–6, 2019	505 (RV)	± 4.4%	41%	51%	–	8%
Emerson College	Feb 21–22, 2019	910 (RV)	± 3.2%	45%	55%	–	–
Praecones Analytica	Jan 16–21, 2019	593 (RV)	± 5.3%	41%	54%	–	5%
American Research Group	Mar 21–27, 2018	1,365 (RV)	± 3.0%	49%	45%	–	5%

Donald Trump vs. Elizabeth Warren

Poll source	Date(s) administered	Sample size	Margin of error	Donald Trump (R)	Elizabeth Warren (D)	Other	Undecided
AtlasIntel	Feb 8–10, 2020	1,100 (RV)	± 3%	46.8%	40.5%	–	12.7%
Marist College/NBC News	Jan 20–23, 2020	2,223 (RV)	± 2.6%	44%	48%	2%	5%
Inside Sources	Jan 16–21, 2020	593 (RV)	–	41%	54%	–	5%
Emerson College	Nov 23–26, 2019	637 (RV)	± 3.8%	51%	49%	–	–
Emerson College	Nov 23–26, 2019	547 (RV)	± 4.1%	43%	47%	–	10%
Saint Anselm College	Nov 13–18, 2019	512 (RV)	± 4.3%	46%	47%	–	7%
Emerson College	Sep 6–9, 2019	1,041 (RV)	± 3.0%	51%	49%	–	–
Gravis Marketing	Aug 2–6, 2019	505 (RV)	± 4.4%	44%	49%	–	7%
Emerson College	Feb 21–22, 2019	910 (RV)	± 3.2%	48%	52%	–	–
Praecones Analytica	Jan 16–21, 2019	593 (RV)	± 5.3%	41%	54%	–	5%
American Research Group	Mar 21–27, 2018	1,365 (RV)	± 3.0%	50%	42%	–	9%

Donald Trump vs. Michael Bloomberg

Poll source	Date(s) administered	Sample size	Margin of error	Donald Trump (R)	Michael Bloomberg (D)	Other	Undecided
University of New Hampshire	Feb 19–25, 2020	561 (LV)	± 4.1%	47%	33%	16%	5%

Donald Trump vs. Pete Buttigieg

Poll source	Date(s) administered	Sample size	Margin of error	Donald Trump (R)	Pete Buttegieg (D)	Other	Undecided
University of New Hampshire	Feb 19–25, 2020	569 (LV)	± 4.1%	42%	48%	7%	3%
AtlasIntel	Feb 8–10, 2020	1,100 (RV)	± 3%	45.3%	46.1%	–	8.6%
Marist College/NBC News	Jan 20–23, 2020	2,223 (RV)	± 2.6%	41%	51%	1%	6%
Emerson College	Nov 23–26, 2019	637 (RV)	± 3.8%	41%	48%	–	–
Emerson College	Nov 23–26, 2019	547 (RV)	± 4.1%	41%	48%	–	11%
Saint Anselm College	Nov 13–18, 2019	512 (RV)	± 4.3%	42%	49%	–	9%
Gravis Marketing	Aug 2–6, 2019	505 (RV)	± 4.4%	42%	49%	–	9%

Donald Trump vs. Andrew Yang

Poll source	Date(s) administered	Sample size	Margin of error	Donald Trump (R)	Andrew Yang (D)	Undecided
Emerson College	November 23–26, 2019	637 (RV)	± 3.8%	51%	49%	–
Emerson College	November 23–26, 2019	547 (RV)	± 4.1%	42%	46%	12%
Emerson College	September 6–9, 2019	1,041 (RV)	± 3.0%	46%	54%	–

Donald Trump vs. Cory Booker

Poll source	Date(s) administered	Sample size	Margin of error	Donald Trump (R)	Cory Booker (D)	Undecided
Emerson College	Feb 21–22, 2019	910	± 3.2%	49%	51%	–

Donald Trump vs. Kamala Harris

Poll source	Date(s) administered	Sample size	Margin of error	Donald Trump (R)	Kamala Harris (D)	Undecided
Emerson College	September 6–9, 2019	1,041 (RV)	± 3.0%	49%	51%	–
Gravis Marketing	August 2–6, 2019	505 (RV)	± 4.4%	44%	47%	9%
Emerson College	Feb 21–22, 2019	910 (RV)	± 3.2%	48%	52%	–

Donald Trump vs. Beto O'Rourke

Poll source	Date(s) administered	Sample size	Margin of error	Donald Trump (R)	Beto O'Rourke (D)	Undecided
Praecones Analytica	Jan 16–21, 2019	593 (RV)	± 5.3%	41%	48%	12%

Hypothetical polling

with Donald Trump, Bernie Sanders, and Howard Schultz

Poll source	Date(s) administered	Sample size	Margin of error	Donald Trump (R)	Bernie Sanders (D)	Howard Schultz (I)	Undecided
Emerson College	Feb 21–22, 2019	910 (RV)	± 3.2%	42%	48%	10%	–

with Donald Trump, Elizabeth Warren, and Howard Schultz

Poll source	Date(s) administered	Sample size	Margin of error	Donald Trump (R)	Elizabeth Warren (D)	Howard Schultz (I)	Undecided
Emerson College	Feb 21–22, 2019	910 (RV)	± 3.2%	45%	44%	12%	–

with John Kasich and Joe Biden

Poll source	Date(s) administered	Sample size	Margin of error	John Kasich (R)	Joe Biden (D)	Undecided
American Research Group	Mar 21–27, 2018	1,365 (RV)	± 3.0%	45%	46%	8%

with John Kasich and Elizabeth Warren

Poll source	Date(s) administered	Sample size	Margin of error	John Kasich (R)	Elizabeth Warren (D)	Undecided
American Research Group	Mar 21–27, 2018	1,365 (RV)	± 3.0%	52%	37%	11%

with Donald Trump and generic Democrat

Poll source	Date(s) administered	Sample size	Margin of error	Donald Trump (R)	Generic Democrat	Other	Undecided
RKM Research and Communications Inc./Boston Herald/FPU/NBC10	Jan 29-Feb 1, 2020	892 (V)	–	36%	49%	9% (Note: "Someone else" with 9%)	7%
Praecones Analytica	Aug 13–15, 2018	626 (RV)	± 5.4%	38%	49%	–	13%

with Donald Trump, generic Democrat, and generic third party

Poll source	Date(s) administered	Sample size	Margin of error	Donald Trump (R)	Generic Democrat	Generic third party	Undecided
Suffolk University	Apr 25–28, 2019	800 (LV)	± 3.5%	40%	43%	6%	11%

with Donald Trump and Generic Opponent

Poll source	Date(s) administered	Sample size	Margin of error	Donald Trump (R)	Generic Opponent	Other	Undecided
University of New Hampshire/CNN	Jan 15–23, 2020	1,169 (A)	± 2.9%	46%	49% (Note: Would vote for a candidate other than Trump)	2% (Note: Would not vote with 2%)	2%

=== Results ===
2020 United States presidential election in New Hampshire
Party	Candidate	Votes	%	±%
Democratic	Joe Biden Kamala Harris	424,937	52.71%	+5.88%
Republican	Donald Trump Mike Pence	365,660	45.36%	−1.10%
Libertarian	Jo Jorgensen Spike Cohen	13,236	1.64%	−2.49%
Green	Howie Hawkins (write-in) Angela Walker (write-in)	217	0.03%	−0.84%
Independent	Bernie Sanders (write-in)	192	0.02%	−0.58%
Republican	Mitt Romney (write-in)	170	0.02%	−0.05%
Democratic	Tulsi Gabbard (write-in)	142	0.02%	N/A
Independent	Kanye West (write-in)	82	0.01%	N/A
Republican	John Kasich (write-in)	67	0.01%	−0.17%
Democratic	Andrew Yang (write-in)	58	0.01%	N/A
Republican	Mike Pence (write-in)	56	0.01%	N/A
Democratic	Pete Buttigieg (write-in)	47	0.01%	N/A
Republican	Chris Sununu (write-in)	46	0.01%	N/A
Republican	Bill Weld (write-in)	23	0.00%	N/A
Libertarian	Vermin Supreme (write-in)	22	0.00%	−0.01%
Democratic	Amy Klobuchar (write-in)	19	0.00%	N/A
Democratic	Andrew Cuomo (write-in)	14	0.00%	N/A
Democratic	Jeanne Shaheen (write-in)	14	0.00%	N/A
Libertarian	Ron Paul (write-in)	13	0.00%	−0.01%
Republican	Condoleezza Rice (write-in)	12	0.00%	N/A
Republican	Mike Huckabee (write-in)	10	0.00%	N/A
Democratic	Michelle Obama (write-in)	10	0.00%	N/A
Total votes		806,205	100.00%	N/A

==== By county ====
County	Joe Biden Democratic		Donald Trump Republican		Various candidates Other parties		Margin		Total votes cast
County	#	%	#	%	#	%	#	%	Total votes cast
Belknap	16,894	43.90%	20,899	54.31%	686	1.79%	-4,005	-10.41%	38,479
Carroll	16,649	50.00%	16,150	48.50%	498	1.50%	499	1.50%	33,297
Cheshire	25,522	57.52%	17,898	40.34%	950	2.14%	7,624	17.18%	44,370
Coos	7,640	46.18%	8,617	52.09%	287	1.73%	-977	-5.91%	16,544
Grafton	33,180	61.29%	19,905	36.77%	1,047	1.94%	13,275	24.52%	54,132
Hillsborough	122,344	52.81%	104,625	45.16%	4,690	2.03%	17,719	7.65%	231,659
Merrimack	48,533	53.85%	39,711	44.06%	1,889	2.09%	8,822	9.79%	90,133
Rockingham	100,064	50.20%	95,858	48.09%	3,420	1.71%	4,206	2.11%	199,342
Strafford	41,721	56.53%	30,489	41.31%	1,595	2.16%	11,232	15.22%	73,805
Sullivan	12,390	50.69%	11,508	47.08%	546	2.23%	882	3.61%	24,444
Totals	424,937	52.71%	365,660	45.36%	15,608	1.93%	59,277	7.35%	806,205

Counties that flipped from Republican to Democratic

- Carroll (largest municipality: Conway)
- Hillsborough (largest municipality: Manchester)
- Rockingham (largest municipality: Derry)
- Sullivan (largest municipality: Claremont)

==== By congressional district ====
Biden won both congressional districts.

District	Biden	Trump	Representative
1st	52%	46%	Chris Pappas
2nd	54%	45%	Annie Kuster

== Analysis ==
Biden flipped the counties of Carroll, Hillsborough, Rockingham, and Sullivan, of which Hillsborough (which houses the state's largest city of Manchester) and Sullivan had voted for Barack Obama twice before switching to Trump in 2016. Carroll and Rockingham last voted Democratic in 2008, although Rockingham last gave a Democrat a majority of the vote in 1964. Biden also significantly expanded Hillary Clinton's 2016 lead of 2,736 votes (0.37%) to 59,267 votes (7.35%).

=== Edison exit polls ===
2020 presidential election in New Hampshire by demographic subgroup (Edison exit polling)
Demographic subgroup	Biden	Trump	% of total vote
Total vote	52.71	45.36	100
Ideology
Liberals	93	7	24
Moderates	64	33	44
Conservatives	9	91	32
Party
Democrats	94	6	23
Republicans	10	90	31
Independents	62	35	46
Gender
Men	47	52	47
Women	58	40	53
Race/ethnicity
White	52	46	92
Non-white	56	41	8
Age
18–24 years old	50	48	9
25–29 years old	58	35	8
30–39 years old	54	42	14
40–49 years old	50	49	15
50–64 years old	51	49	31
65 and older	56	43	23
Sexual orientation
LGBT	–	–	7
Not LGBT	50	48	93
Education
High school or less	43	53	20
Some college education	45	54	26
Associate degree	44	54	13
Bachelor's degree	63	36	25
Postgraduate degree	68	30	17
Income
Under $30,000	71	28	12
$30,000–49,999	45	51	18
$50,000–99,999	54	44	30
Over $100,000	53	46	40
Issue regarded as most important
Racial inequality	87	10	14
Coronavirus	95	5	21
Economy	12	87	33
Crime and safety	15	83	10
Health care	89	8	13
Region
Seacoast	60	38	17
Manchester/Concord	57	42	24
Southwest/Connecticut Valley	57	41	20
Southeast	44	54	21
North	47	52	18
Area type
Urban	67	31	9
Suburban	50	48	60
Rural	54	45	31
Family's financial situation today
Better than four years ago	19	80	43
Worse than four years ago	82	12	19
About the same	79	20	38

== See also ==
- Presidency of Joe Biden
- 2020 New Hampshire elections
- United States presidential elections in New Hampshire
- 2020 United States presidential election
- 2020 Democratic Party presidential primaries
- 2020 Republican Party presidential primaries
- 2020 New Hampshire elections
- 2020 United States elections

== Notes ==
Partisan clients
