= Eric Schleien =

American politician

Member of New Hampshire House of Representatives for Hillsborough 37
- In office 2014–2018

Personal details
- Party: Republican
- Website: ericschleien.com/state-representative/

Eric Schleien is an American politician. He was a member of the New Hampshire House of Representatives and represented Hillsborough 37th district from 2014 to 2018.

== Career ==
In 2018, Schleien pleaded guilty to assault charges. House Majority Leader Dick Hinch called on him to resign from the legislature.

== Political endorsements ==
Schleien endorsed Frank Edelblut in the 2016 New Hampshire gubernatorial election. Schleien endorsed the Rand Paul 2016 presidential campaign.
