= New Hampshire Department of Education =

Government agency in the U.S. state of New Hampshire

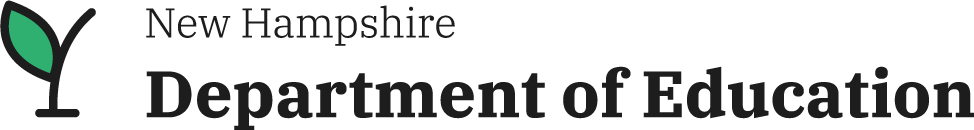

Agency overview
- Jurisdiction: New Hampshire
- Headquarters: 101 Pleasant Street (Note: As of February 2022, the department's headquarters are located at 25 Hall Street due to construction work at the Pleasant Street facility.) Concord, New Hampshire
- Motto: Live Free and Learn
- Agency executive: Frank Edelblut, Commissioner
- Website: www.education.nh.gov

The New Hampshire Department of Education is the state education agency of the U.S. state of New Hampshire. It is headquartered in Concord. Frank Edelblut has led the department as commissioner since February 16, 2017.

== History ==
New Hampshire has had a department of education since at least 1922.

== Organization ==
The department "advances learner-centered opportunities that create bright futures."

In addition to a commissioner's office and deputy commissioner's office, the department consists of four divisions:

- Division of Learner Support
- Division of Educator and Analytic Resources
- Division of Educator Support and Higher Education
- Division of Workforce Innovation

Administratively attached to the department are:

- State Board of Education
  - A seven-member body whose members are appointed by the governor and executive council
- Higher Education Commission
  - A 17-member body (as of February 2022) which "regulates institutions of higher education in the state"
- Council for Teacher Education
  - A seven-member body authorized by statute (RSA 190) to coordinate teacher education in the state
- Professional Standards Board
  - A 21-member body authorized by statute (RSA 186:60) to advise the State Board of Education on matters related to the education profession
