= 2012 New Hampshire gubernatorial election =

- November 6, 2012
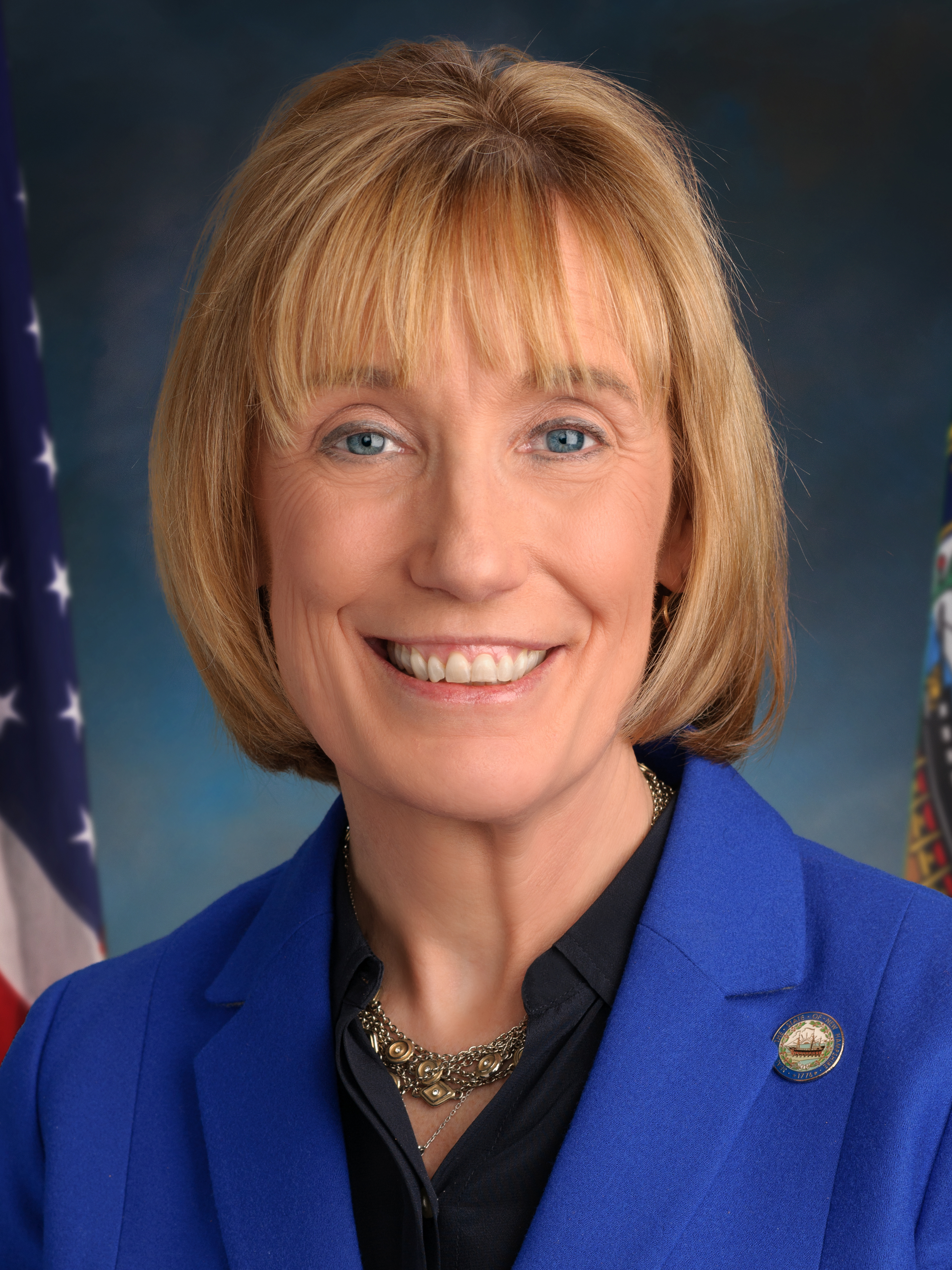

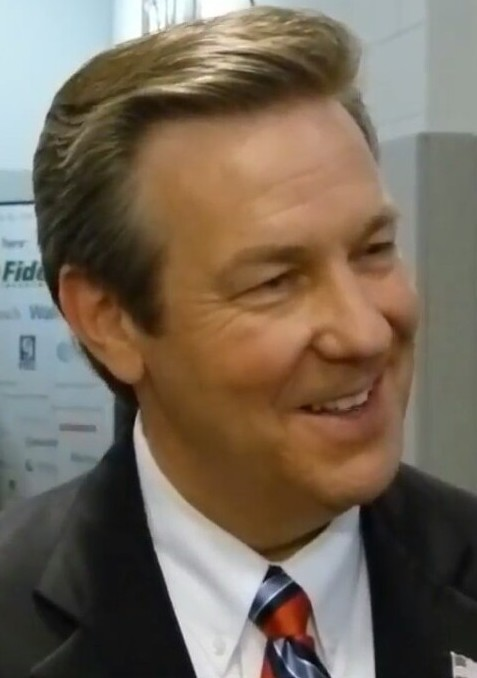
Nominee	Maggie Hassan	Ovide Lamontagne
Party	Democratic	Republican
Popular vote	378,934	295,026
Percentage	54.61%	42.52%
- Hassan: 40–50% 50–60% 60–70% 70–80% >90% Lamontagne: 40–50% 50–60% 60–70% 70–80% 80–90% Tie: 40–50%
Governor before election
John Lynch
Democratic
Elected Governor
Maggie Hassan
Democratic

The 2012 New Hampshire gubernatorial election took place on November 6, 2012, concurrently with the 2012 U.S. presidential election, U.S. House elections, and various state and local elections.

Four-term incumbent governor John Lynch was eligible to seek a fifth term. In the fall of 2011, Lynch announced that he would retire rather than run for re-election. On September 11, 2012, Democrat Maggie Hassan and Republican Ovide Lamontagne defeated primary opponents to win their parties' nominations. Hassan won the election while carrying every county in the state and began the two-year term on January 3, 2013.

== Democratic primary ==
=== Candidates ===
- Jackie Cilley, former state Senator
- Maggie Hassan, former majority leader of the New Hampshire Senate
- Bill Kennedy, firefighter and retired Air Force officer

==== Declined ====
- Mark Connolly, former director of the New Hampshire's Bureau of Securities Regulation
- Tom Ferrini, mayor of Portsmouth
- Gary Hirshberg, chairman and former CEO of Stonyfield Farm
- John Lynch, incumbent governor
- Steve Marchand, former mayor of Portsmouth
- Phil McLaughlin, former state Attorney General
- Terry Shumaker, lawyer and former United States Ambassador to Trinidad and Tobago

=== Polling ===
Poll source	Date(s) administered	Sample size	Margin of error	Jackie Cilley	Maggie Hassan	Other	Undecided
Public Policy Polling	August 9–12, 2012	400	± 4.9%	24%	30%	—	46%
Public Policy Polling	May 10–13, 2012	477	± 4.5%	20%	23%	—	57%

=== Results ===
Results by county: Hassan—60–70% Hassan—50–60% Hassan—40–50% Cilley—50–60% Cilley—40–50%

Democratic primary results
Party	Candidate	Votes	%
Democratic	Maggie Hassan	45,120	53.1
Democratic	Jackie Cilley	33,066	38.9
Democratic	Bill Kennedy	5,936	7.0
Democratic	Other	850	1.0
Total votes		84,972	100

== Republican primary ==
=== Candidates ===
- Ovide M. Lamontagne, attorney, 1992 congressional candidate, nominee for governor in 1996 and candidate for the U.S. Senate in 2010
- Kevin H. Smith, conservative activist and former state Representative
- Robert Tarr

==== Declined ====
- Bill Binnie, businessman and candidate for the U.S. Senate in 2010
- Jeb Bradley, New Hampshire Senate Majority Leader and former U.S. Representative
- Peter Bragdon, state Senate President
- Ted Gatsas, Mayor of Manchester
- Steve Kenda, businessman
- John Lyons, chairman of the New Hampshire Board of Education
- John Stephen, former Health and Human Services Commissioner and Republican nominee for governor in 2010

=== Polling ===
Poll source	Date(s) administered	Sample size	Margin of error	Ovide Lamontagne	Kevin Smith	Other	Undecided
Public Policy Polling	August 9–12, 2012	662	± 3.8%	49%	21%	—	30%
Public Policy Polling	May 10–13, 2012	555	± 4.2%	53%	13%	—	34%
Public Policy Polling	January 7–8, 2012	1,771	± 2.3%	40%	12%	—	48%

=== Results ===
Results by county: Lamontagne—80–90% Lamontagne—60–70%

Republican primary results
Party	Candidate	Votes	%
Republican	Ovide Lamontagne	73,437	67.7
Republican	Kevin Smith	32,396	29.8
Republican	Robert Tarr	1,725	1.6
Republican	Other	988	0.9
Total votes		108,546	100

== General election ==
=== Candidates ===
- John Babiarz (Libertarian), businessman and party nominee for governor in 2000, 2002, and 2010
- Maggie Hassan (D), former majority leader of the New Hampshire Senate
- Ovide Lamontagne (R), attorney, Republican nominee for governor in 1996, and candidate for the U.S. Senate in 2010

=== Debates ===
- Complete video of debate, C-SPAN, September 14, 2012
- Complete video of debate, C-SPAN, October 8, 2012

=== Predictions ===
Source	Ranking	As of
The Cook Political Report	Tossup	November 1, 2012
Sabato's Crystal Ball	Lean D	November 5, 2012
Rothenberg Political Report	Tossup	November 2, 2012
Real Clear Politics	Lean D	November 5, 2012

=== Polling ===
Poll source	Date(s) administered	Sample size	Margin of error	Maggie Hassan (D)	Ovide Lamontagne (R)	Other	Undecided
Rasmussen Reports	November 4, 2012	750	± 4%	50%	45%	1%	4%
New England College	November 3–4, 2012	666	± 4.1%	47%	45%	1%	7%
Public Policy Polling	November 3–4, 2012	1,550	± 2.5%	51%	47%	—	2%
WMUR/University of New Hampshire	November 1–4, 2012	789	± 3.5%	54%	43%	3%	—
WMUR/University of New Hampshire	October 31–November 2, 2012	502	± 4.4%	47%	42%	3%	8%
NBC/WSJ/Marist	October 28–29, 2012	1013	± 3.1%	49%	44%	1%	6%
Public Policy Polling	October 26–28, 2012	874	± 3.3%	48%	44%	—	8%
New England College	October 23–25, 2012	571	± 4.1%	45%	45%	1%	9%
Rasmussen Reports	October 23, 2012	500	± 4.5%	46%	48%	1%	5%
WMUR/University of New Hampshire	October 17–21, 2012	773	± 3.5%	43%	35%	3%	18%
Public Policy Polling	October 17–19, 2012	1,036	± 3.0%	45%	43%	—	12%
Rasmussen Reports	October 15, 2012	500	± 4.5%	46%	48%	—	5%
Suffolk University/7NEWS	October 12–14, 2012	500	± 4.4%	41%	38%	4%	16%
American Research Group	October 9–11, 2012	600	± 4%	40%	46%	3%	11%
Rasmussen Reports	October 9, 2012	500	± 4.5%	48%	46%	—	5%
WMUR/University of New Hampshire	October 1–6, 2012	419	± 4.8%	35%	39%	3%	23%
WMUR/University of New Hampshire	September 27–30, 2012	600	± 4.0%	38%	36%	2%	25%
Public Policy Polling	September 24–25, 2012	862	± 3.3%	51%	44%	—	5%
NBC/The Wall Street Journal/Marist College	September 23–25, 2012	1012	± 3.1%	47%	45%	1%	7%
Greenberg Quinlan Rosner	September 15–19, 2012	600	± 4.9%	48%	46%	—	6%
Rasmussen Reports	September 18, 2012	500	± 4.5%	44%	48%	2%	7%
Public Policy Polling	August 9–12, 2012	1,055	± 3.0%	45%	43%	—	12%
WMUR/University of New Hampshire	August 1–12, 2012	555	± 4.2%	31%	33%	1%	35%
Rasmussen Reports	June 20, 2012	500	± 4.5%	36%	42%	—	22%
Public Policy Polling	May 10–13, 2012	1,163	± 2.9%	39%	40%	—	21%
WMUR/University of New Hampshire	April 9–20, 2012	486	± 4.4%	34%	29%	1%	36%
WMUR/University of New Hampshire	January 25–February 2, 2012	495	± 4.4%	26%	32%	1%	41%
Public Policy Polling	June 30–July 5, 2011	662	± 3.8%	35%	41%	—	24%

Hypothetical polling

With Cilley

Poll source	Date(s) administered	Sample size	Margin of error	Jackie Cilley (D)	Ovide Lamontagne (R)	Other	Undecided
Public Policy Polling	August 9–12, 2012	1,055	± 3.0%	42%	42%	—	16%
WMUR/University of New Hampshire	August 1–12, 2012	555	± 4.2%	31%	35%	1%	33%
Rasmussen Reports	June 20, 2012	500	± 4.5%	39%	41%	—	20%
Public Policy Polling	May 10–13, 2012	1,163	± 2.9%	38%	38%	—	24%
WMUR/University of New Hampshire	April 9–20, 2012	486	± 4.4%	31%	30%	1%	38%

Poll source	Date(s) administered	Sample size	Margin of error	Jackie Cilley (D)	Kevin Smith (R)	Other	Undecided
Public Policy Polling	August 9–12, 2012	1,055	± 3.0%	39%	38%	—	23%
WMUR/University of New Hampshire	August 1–12, 2012	555	± 4.2%	31%	28%	1%	39%
Rasmussen Reports	June 20, 2012	500	± 4.5%	39%	37%	—	24%
Public Policy Polling	May 10–13, 2012	1,163	± 2.9%	37%	32%	—	31%
WMUR/University of New Hampshire	April 9–20, 2012	486	± 4.4%	30%	23%	1%	47%

With Smith

Poll source	Date(s) administered	Sample size	Margin of error	Maggie Hassan (D)	Kevin Smith (R)	Other	Undecided
Public Policy Polling	August 9–12, 2012	1,055	± 3.0%	42%	39%	—	20%
WMUR/University of New Hampshire	August 1–12, 2012	555	± 4.2%	31%	29%	1%	39%
Rasmussen Reports	June 20, 2012	500	± 4.5%	36%	39%	—	25%
Public Policy Polling	May 10–13, 2012	1,163	± 2.9%	37%	31%	—	32%
WMUR/University of New Hampshire	April 9–20, 2012	486	± 4.4%	29%	24%	1%	46%

With Kennedy

Poll source	Date(s) administered	Sample size	Margin of error	Bill Kennedy (D)	Ovide Lamontagne (R)	Other	Undecided
WMUR/University of New Hampshire	August 1–12, 2012	555	± 4.2%	29%	35%	1%	36%

Poll source	Date(s) administered	Sample size	Margin of error	Bill Kennedy (D)	Kevin Smith (R)	Other	Undecided
WMUR/University of New Hampshire	August 1–12, 2012	555	± 4.2%	27%	29%	1%	44%

With Bradley

Poll source	Date(s) administered	Sample size	Margin of error	Mark Connolly (D)	Jeb Bradley (R)	Other	Undecided
Public Policy Polling	June 30-July 5, 2011	662	± 3.8%	30%	38%	—	31%

Poll source	Date(s) administered	Sample size	Margin of error	Maggie Hassan (D)	Jeb Bradley (R)	Other	Undecided
Public Policy Polling	June 30-July 5, 2011	662	± 3.8%	33%	39%	—	28%

Poll source	Date(s) administered	Sample size	Margin of error	Steve Marchand (D)	Jeb Bradley (R)	Other	Undecided
Public Policy Polling	June 30-July 5, 2011	662	± 3.8%	32%	38%	—	31%

With Connolly

Poll source	Date(s) administered	Sample size	Margin of error	Mark Connolly (D)	Ovide Lamontagne (R)	Other	Undecided
Public Policy Polling	June 30-July 5, 2011	662	± 3.8%	34%	40%	—	26%

Poll source	Date(s) administered	Sample size	Margin of error	Mark Connolly (D)	John Stephen (R)	Other	Undecided
Public Policy Polling	June 30-July 5, 2011	662	± 3.8%	36%	36%	—	28%

Poll source	Date(s) administered	Sample size	Margin of error	Mark Connolly (D)	John E. Sununu (R)	Other	Undecided
Public Policy Polling	June 30-July 5, 2011	662	± 3.8%	36%	44%	—	20%

With Gatsas

Poll source	Date(s) administered	Sample size	Margin of error	Maggie Hassan (D)	Ted Gatsas (R)	Other	Undecided
WMUR/University of New Hampshire	January 25-February 2, 2012	495	± 4.4%	27%	29%	1%	43%

With Lynch

Poll source	Date(s) administered	Sample size	Margin of error	John Lynch (D)	Jeb Bradley (R)	Other	Undecided
Public Policy Polling	June 30-July 5, 2011	662	± 3.8%	54%	35%	—	11%
Public Policy Polling	March 31-April 3, 2011	769	± 3.5%	57%	33%	—	10%

Poll source	Date(s) administered	Sample size	Margin of error	John Lynch (D)	Ovide Lamontagne (R)	Other	Undecided
Public Policy Polling	June 30-July 5, 2011	662	± 3.8%	54%	36%	—	10%
Public Policy Polling	March 31-April 3, 2011	769	± 3.5%	57%	33%	—	10%

Poll source	Date(s) administered	Sample size	Margin of error	John Lynch (D)	John Stephen (R)	Other	Undecided
Public Policy Polling	June 30-July 5, 2011	662	± 3.8%	55%	34%	—	11%
Public Policy Polling	March 31-April 3, 2011	769	± 3.5%	57%	29%	—	14%

Poll source	Date(s) administered	Sample size	Margin of error	John Lynch (D)	John E. Sununu (R)	Other	Undecided
Public Policy Polling	June 30-July 5, 2011	662	± 3.8%	51%	40%	—	8%
Public Policy Polling	March 31-April 3, 2011	769	± 3.5%	54%	36%	—	11%

With Marchand

Poll source	Date(s) administered	Sample size	Margin of error	Steve Marchand (D)	Ovide Lamontagne (R)	Other	Undecided
Public Policy Polling	June 30-July 5, 2011	662	± 3.8%	33%	40%	—	27%

Poll source	Date(s) administered	Sample size	Margin of error	Steve Marchand (D)	John Stephen (R)	Other	Undecided
Public Policy Polling	June 30-July 5, 2011	662	± 3.8%	34%	36%	—	30%

Poll source	Date(s) administered	Sample size	Margin of error	Steve Marchand (D)	John E. Sununu (R)	Other	Undecided
Public Policy Polling	June 30-July 5, 2011	662	± 3.8%	35%	44%	—	21%

With Stephen

Poll source	Date(s) administered	Sample size	Margin of error	Maggie Hassan (D)	John Stephen (R)	Other	Undecided
Public Policy Polling	June 30-July 5, 2011	662	± 3.8%	36%	37%	—	27%

With Sununu

Poll source	Date(s) administered	Sample size	Margin of error	Maggie Hassan (D)	John E. Sununu (R)	Other	Undecided
Public Policy Polling	June 30-July 5, 2011	662	± 3.8%	36%	45%	—	19%

=== Results ===

2012 New Hampshire gubernatorial election
Party	Candidate	Votes	%	±%
Democratic	Maggie Hassan	378,934	54.61%	+1.98%
Republican	Ovide Lamontagne	295,026	42.52%	−2.51%
Libertarian	John J. Babiarz	19,251	2.77%	+0.56%
Write-in		666	0.10%	-0.02%
Total votes		693,877	100.00%	N/A
Democratic hold				

==== By county ====
2014 Senate election results in New Hampshire (by county)
County	Maggie Hassan Democratic		Ovide Lamontagne Republican		Other votes	
	#	%	#	%	#	%
Belknap	16,756	50.3%	15,702	47.1%	846	2.6%
Carroll	14,339	51.4%	12,893	46.2%	679	2.5%
Cheshire	25,136	63.0%	13,490	33.8%	1,269	3.2%
Coös	8,929	58.0%	6,069	39.4%	400	2.6%
Grafton	29,412	61.9%	16,476	34.7%	1,634	3.4%
Hillsborough	104,547	52.0%	90,621	45.1%	5,942	3.0%
Merrimack	46,037	58.2%	31,127	39.3%	1,972	2.5%
Rockingham	84,287	50.8%	77,095	46.5%	4,502	2.7%
Strafford	37,120	59.5%	23,387	37.5%	1,883	3.0%
Sullivan	12,371	58.0%	8,166	38.3%	790	3.7%

Counties that flipped from Republican to Democratic

- Rockingham (largest municipality: Derry)

==== By congressional district ====
Hassan won both congressional districts.

District	Hassan	Lamontagne	Representative
1st	52.98%	44.43%	Carol Shea-Porter
2nd	56.38%	40.66%	Annie Kuster
