= Frank Edelblut =

American businessman and politician

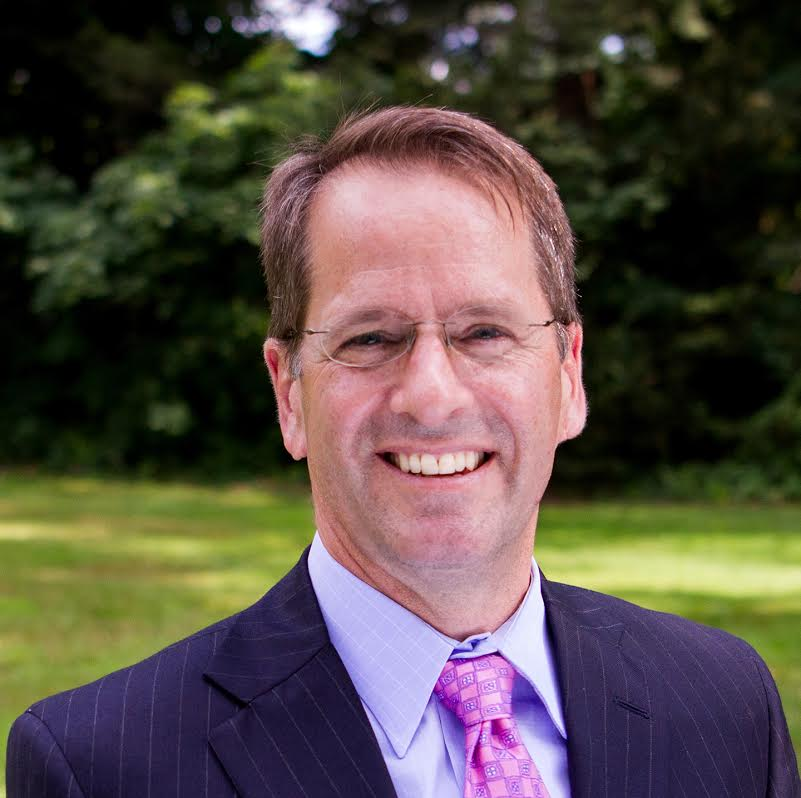

Former Commissioner of the New Hampshire Department of Education
- In office February 16, 2017 – August 5, 2025
- Governor: Chris Sununu; Kelly Ayotte
- Preceded by: Virginia Barry
- Succeeded by: Caitlin D. Davis

Member of the New Hampshire House of Representatives from the 38th Hillsborough district
- In office December 3, 2014 – December 7, 2016
- Preceded by: Richard Eaton
- Succeeded by: John Valera

Personal details
- Born: Louis Frank Edelblut; May 21, 1961 (age 65) Pennsylvania, U.S.
- Party: Republican
- Spouse: Kathleen Ciarlo
- Children: 7
- Education: University of Rhode Island (BS); Hellenic College (MTS)
- Website: Official website

Louis Frank Edelblut (born May 21, 1961) is an American businessman and politician who was the Commissioner of the New Hampshire Department of Education from 2017-2025. Edelblut formerly served as a Republican member of the New Hampshire House of Representatives. During his term in the House, Edelblut represented Hillsborough County District 38, including the towns of Antrim, Bennington, Francestown, Greenville, Greenfield, Hancock, Hillsborough, Lyndeborough, Wilton, and Windsor. He served on the Finance Committee, Special Committee on Pensions, and the Child and Family Law Committee. He was a Republican candidate for Governor of New Hampshire in 2016, narrowly finishing second in the primary.

== Early life and career ==
Edelblut attended the University of Rhode Island where he earned a Bachelor of Science, Business Administration – Accounting in 1983. Edelblut also holds a Masters of Theological Studies from the Holy Cross Greek Orthodox School of Theology, 2015.

Edelblut started his career as an auditor for PricewaterhouseCoopers (PwC) in South Florida (Miami, Fort Lauderdale, and West Palm Beach) where he worked as a Certified Public Accountant auditing a variety of businesses. He then briefly worked as the CFO for one of his PwC clients, Niagara Corp., In 2013, he left Common Angels and now does early-stage investing on his own.

== Political career ==
Edelblut served on the New Hampshire House of Representatives Finance Committee, Special Committee on Pensions and on the Child and Family Law committee.

Edelblut was the prime sponsor of a number of bills in 2016, including bills on net metering, freedom of speech on college campuses, arming otherwise-unarmed New Hampshire National Guard facilities, supporting the ability of members of the military to wear dress uniforms in graduation ceremonies, and several measures in the family court to try to reduce conflict in already difficult divorce proceedings.

In 2016, Edelblut announced he would not seek reelection as state representative and would instead be a Republican candidate for Governor of New Hampshire during the 2016 primary election. Edelblut ultimately lost the election to now-Governor Chris Sununu by fewer than 900 votes. The pair appeared at a joint press conference on the steps of the Capital Building the day following the election, where Edelblut endorsed Sununu.

In January 2017, Governor Chris Sununu nominated Edelblut to be the Commissioner of the New Hampshire Department of Education. Edelblut was confirmed by the Republican led New Hampshire Executive Council in February.

== Personal life ==
Edelblut and his wife have seven children, all of whom have been home educated. He has competed in triathlons and Nordic ski racing, including a biathlon.

New Hampshire House of Representatives
Preceded by Richard Eaton	Member of the New Hampshire House of Representatives from the 38th Hillsborough district 2014–2016; Served alongside: Richard McNamara	Succeeded by John Valera
