= InsideSources =

- Type: Privately-held
- Founded: 2014; 12 years ago
- Brands: InsideSources, DC Journal, DV Journal, NH Journal
- Website: insidesources.com

InsideSources is an American media company that originates and syndicates political news and opinion content, and also operates three regional political news websites: NH Journal, DV Journal, and DC Journal.

== History ==
InsideSources was founded in 2014, hiring former CQ Roll Call reporter David Eldridge and Bloomberg journalist Carter Dougherty to initially staff the outlet.

NH Journal, the oldest of InsideSources' brands, was founded under separate ownership in 2010 by Patrick Hynes and several New Hampshire Republican Party political consultants as a conservative-oriented news website. In 2014 it hired the New Hampshire Union Leader's John DiStaso to helm its coverage, offering him editorial control of the site's content and pledging that future reporting would not come from "a particular political point of view". DiStaso left a year later to move to New Hampshire's ABC News affiliate WMUR, the site falling into dormancy following his departure.

In 2016, InsideSources acquired NH Journal from its former owners with the intent of revitalizing the derelict outlet in advance of the New Hampshire primaries of the 2016 United States presidential election. As of 2025, it operates three regional political news websites: NH Journal, DV [Delaware Valley] Journal, and DC Journal.

== Content ==
According to Media Bias: Fact Check, the publications' content is "factual information that uses loaded words...that attempt to influence an audience by appealing to emotion or stereotypes to favor conservative causes."

According to the company, its opinion content is syndicated to nearly 300 newspapers.

== See also ==
- Political journalism
