= Mark Connolly (public official) =

American politician

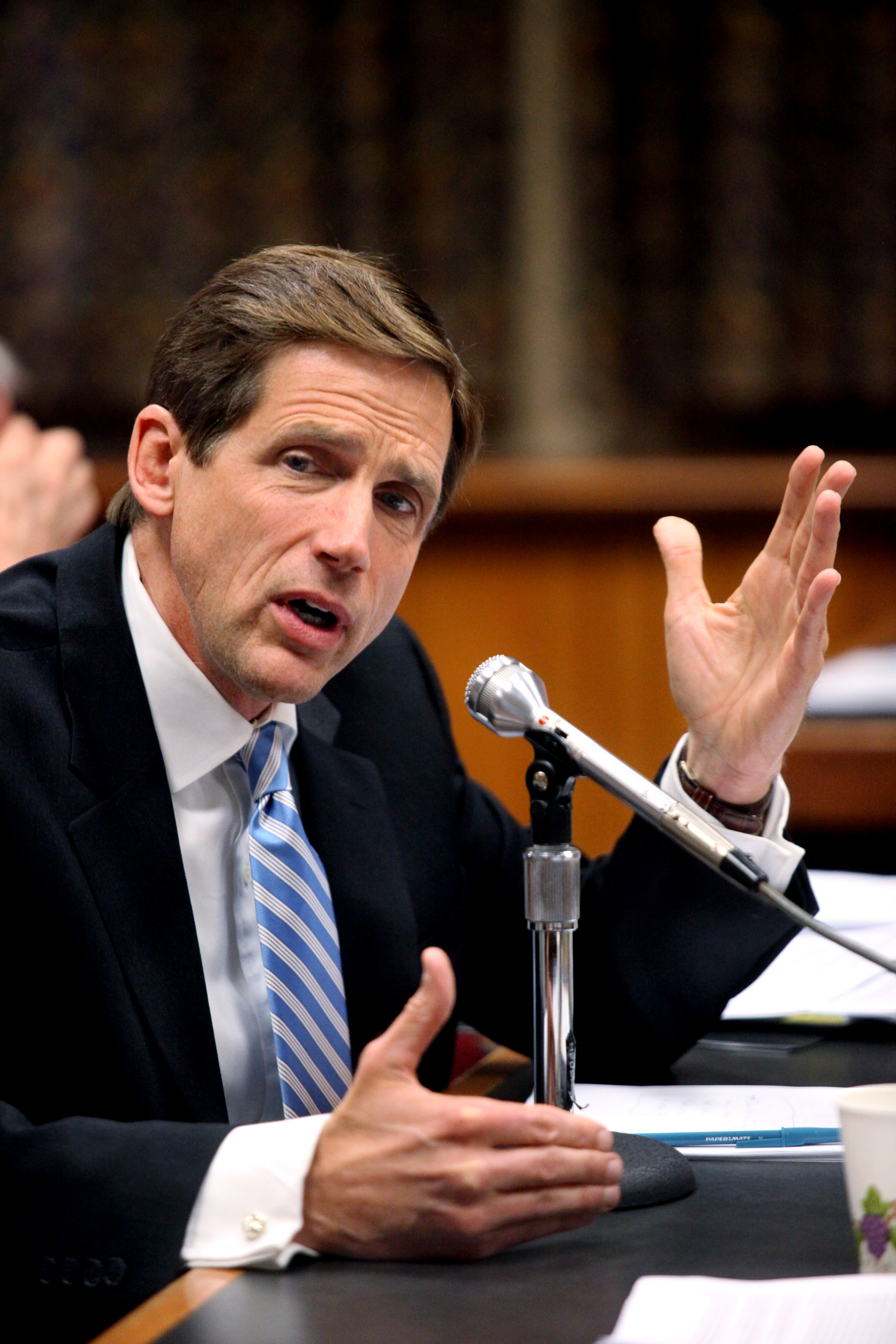

Member of the New Hampshire House of Representatives from the Hillsborough 9th district
- In office December 1, 1976 – December 6, 1978 Serving with Marjorie Y. Peters, Anna S. Van Loan
- Preceded by: Michael B. Ingram
- Succeeded by: James T. Richards

Personal details
- Born: September 2, 1955 Newton, Massachusetts, U.S.
- Died: April 13, 2019 (aged 63) Rancho Mirage, California, U.S.
- Party: Democratic
- Other political affiliations: Republican (formerly)
- Education: Dartmouth College; Northwestern University

Mark Connolly (September 2, 1955 – April 13, 2019) was an American businessman and public official in the state of New Hampshire.

Connolly was a Democratic primary candidate for Governor of New Hampshire in 2016. He had previously served as a Representative in the New Hampshire state legislature, Deputy Secretary of State, and as Director of the New Hampshire Bureau of Securities Regulation from 2002 to 2010.

== Early life and education ==
Connolly was born in Newton, Massachusetts. He earned his Bachelor of Arts in Government and Environmental Studies from Dartmouth College and received his Master of Business Administration through First Chicago's First Scholar program from Northwestern University Kellogg School of Management.

== Career ==
Connolly was first elected to the state legislature in 1977 as a Republican State Representative from Bedford, NH while still a student at Dartmouth College.

He worked for First Chicago, Chubb Life Insurance, Fleet Bank, and Wellington Management Company in the area of investment management.

Connolly was appointed Deputy Secretary of State and later Director of the Bureau of Securities Regulation under Secretary of State William Gardner, where he oversaw cases against Tyco International, Ameriprise, ING, Pennichuck Corp., Morgan Stanley, Merrill Lynch and UBS, netting more than $55 million in securities fines and investor restitution.

Connolly was awarded the North American Securities Administrators Association (NASAA) Inc.'s Outstanding Service Award in 2010. He was also presented with the association's 2007 Enforcement Award.

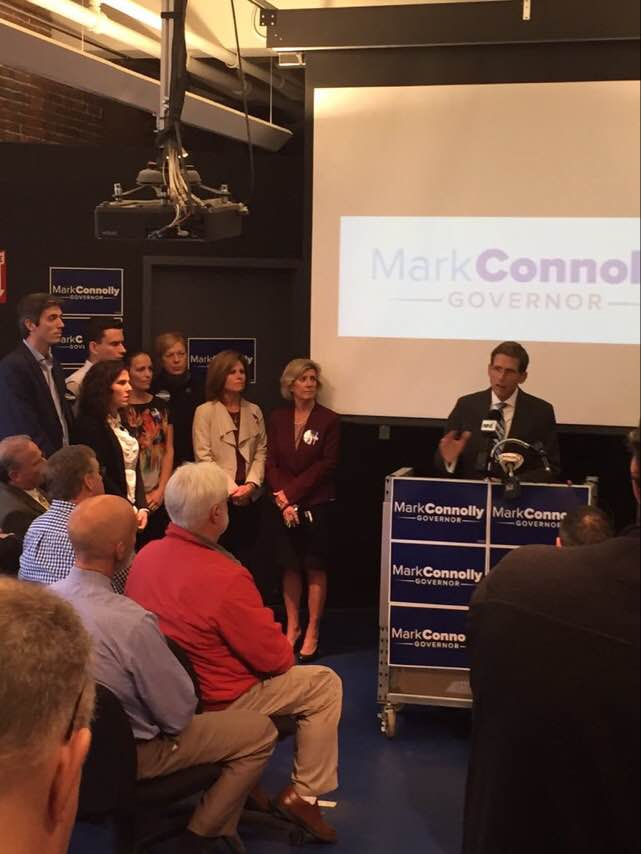
Mark Connolly announces his campaign for the 2016 Democratic nomination for Governor of New Hampshire at FIRST.

After resigning from the Bureau of Securities Regulation in 2010, Connolly became owner and principal of New Castle Investment Advisors, LLC, an asset management firm, located in Portsmouth, NH.

On November 5, 2015, Connolly announced what would ultimately be an unsuccessful bid in the Democratic primary election for Governor of New Hampshire.

== Personal life ==
Connolly lived in New Castle, New Hampshire. He was the former Chairman of the town's Planning Board. He was also a member of the Board of Trustees of the Strawbery Banke Museum and the Portsmouth Athenaeum. He was a former board member of New Hampshire Child and Family Services, the New Hampshire Audubon, and the Greater Manchester Development Commission. He also served as a board member and Treasurer of the Ogunquit Museum of American Art.

Connolly died on April 13, 2019, in Rancho Mirage, California due to complications from a sudden brain hemorrhage.

== Bibliography ==
- Cover-Up: One Man's Pursuit of the Truth Amid the Government's Failure to End a Ponzi Scheme. White Whale Press. 2011.
