= 2026 New Hampshire Senate election =

- November 3, 2026

All 24 seats in the New Hampshire Senate 13 seats needed for a majority
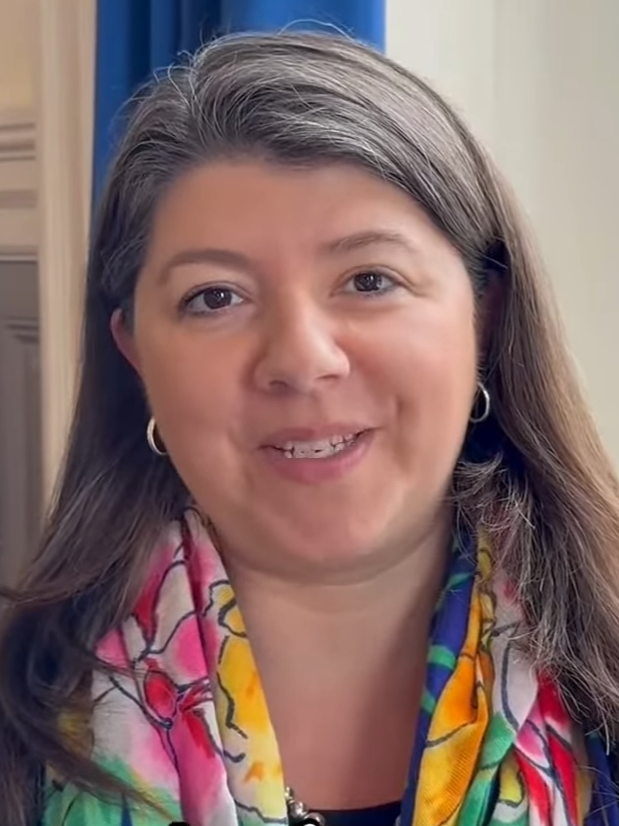

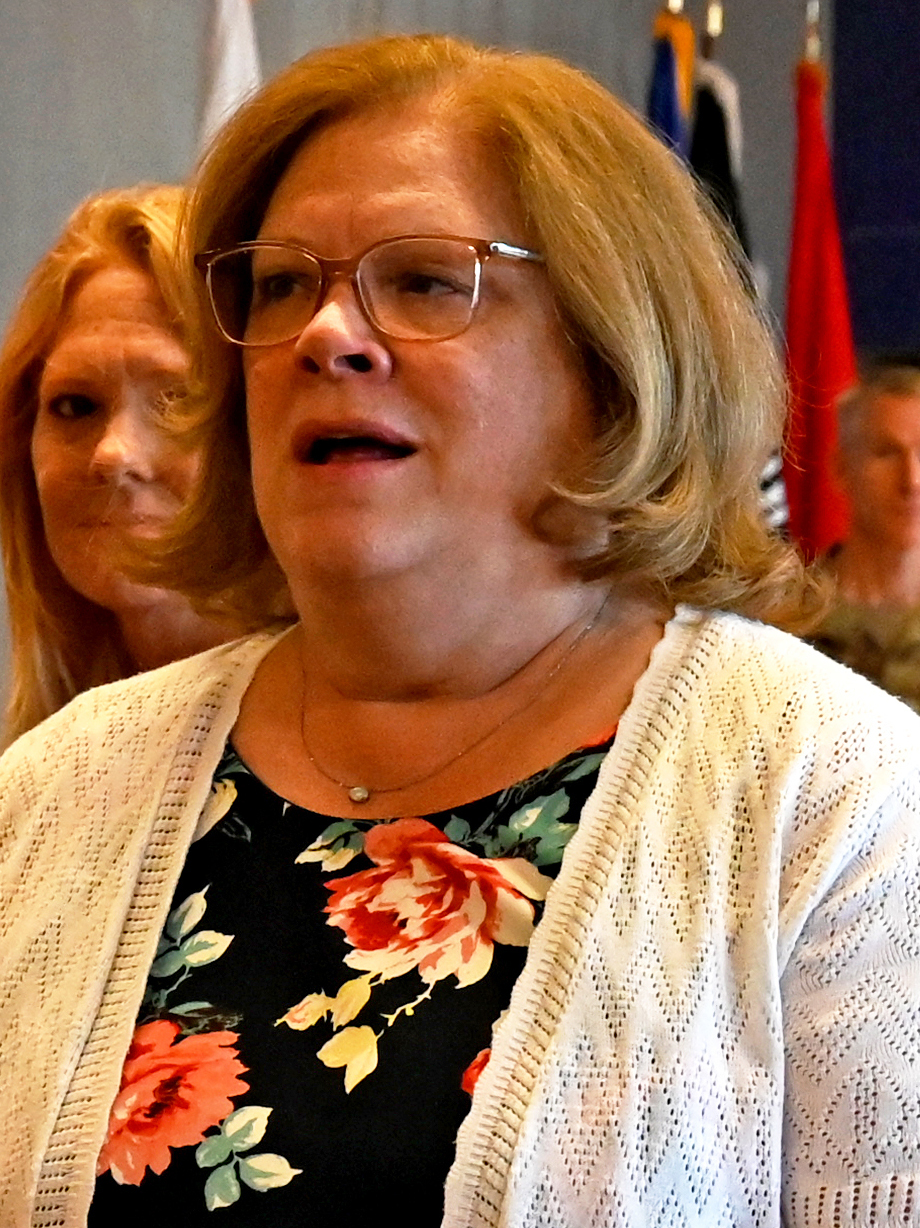
| | Majority party | Minority party |
|---|---|---|
| Leader | Rebecca Perkins Kwoka | Sharon Carson |
| Party | Democratic | Republican |
| Leader's seat | 21st district | 14th district |
| Last election | 8 | 16 |
| Seats won | 15 | 9 |
| Seat change | ▲7 | ▼7 |
- Gains and Holds; Republican hold Democratic hold Democratic gain
President before election
Sharon Carson
Republican
Elected President
Rebecca Perkins Kwoka
Democratic

The 2026 New Hampshire Senate election took place on November 3, 2026, to elect all 24 members to the New Hampshire Senate. The election coincided with elections for governor, U.S. Senate, U.S. House of Representatives, and the New Hampshire House of Representatives.

== Retiring incumbents ==
=== Republicans ===
1. District 8: Ruth Ward is retiring.

=== Democrats ===
1. District 13: Cindy Rosenwald is retiring.

== Predictions ==
| Source | Ranking | As of |
|---|---|---|
| Sabato's Crystal Ball | Lean R | January 22, 2026 |
| State Navigate | Lean D (flip) | October 24, 2026 |

== Generic ballot polling ==
| Poll source | Date(s) administered | Sample size (Note: Key: A – all adults RV – registered voters LV – likely voters V – unclear) | Margin of error | Republican | Democratic | Other | Undecided |
|---|---|---|---|---|---|---|---|
| University of New Hampshire | September 17–21, 2026 | 1,418 (LV) | ± 2.6% | 41% | 51% | 1% | 8% |

== Crossover seats ==
Two districts voted for one party in the 2024 presidential election and another in the 2024 senate election.

=== Democratic ===
No districts won by Donald Trump in 2024 were represented by Democrats.

=== Republican ===
This lists the districts in which Kamala Harris won in 2024 but were represented by Republicans:

| District | | Incumbent | | |
| # | Harris margin of victory in 2024 | Member | Party | Incumbent margin of victory in 2024 |
|---|---|---|---|---|
| 11 | D+6.06 | Tim McGough | Republican | R+1.85 |
| 12 | D+0.70 | Kevin Avard | Republican | R+11.82 |

== District 1 ==
Incumbent David Rochefort, who was first elected in 2024 with 56.82% of the vote, won reelection.

Republican primary

Nominee

- David Rochefort, incumbent (2024-present)

Democratic primary

Nominee

- Cathleen Fountain, member of the White Mountains Regional school board

2026 New Hampshire Senate election, 1st District
| Party | Candidate | Votes | % |
|---|---|---|---|
| Republican | David Rochefort (Incumbent) | 12,987 | 53.32 |
| Democratic | Cathleen Fountain | 11,361 | 46.65 |
| Write-in | | 8 | 0.03 |
| Total votes | | 24,356 | 100.0 |
| Republican hold | | | |

== District 2 ==
Incumbent Timothy Lang Sr., who was re-elected in 2024 with 58.28% of the vote, lost reelection.

Republican primary

Nominee

- Timothy Lang Sr., incumbent (2024-present)

Democratic primary

Nominee

- Kurt Webber, educator, veteran and candidate for state representative in 2024 and 2022

2026 New Hampshire Senate election, 2nd District
| Party | Candidate | Votes | % |
|---|---|---|---|
| Democratic | Kurt Webber | 14,563 | 52.12 |
| Republican | Timothy Lang Sr. (incumbent) | 13,365 | 47.83 |
| Write-in | | 15 | 0.05 |
| Total votes | | 27,943 | 100.0 |
| Democratic gain from Republican | | | |

== District 3 ==
Incumbent Mark McConkey, who was first elected in 2024 with 56.70% of the vote, won reelection.

Republican primary

Nominee

- Mark McConkey, incumbent (2024-present)

Democratic primary

Nominee

- Bobbi Boudman, state representative (2026-present)

2026 New Hampshire Senate election, 3rd District
| Party | Candidate | Votes | % |
|---|---|---|---|
| Republican | Mark McConkey (Incumbent) | 15,945 | 52.51 |
| Democratic | Bobbi Boudman | 14,387 | 47.38 |
| Write-in | | 33 | 0.11 |
| Total votes | | 30,365 | 100.0 |
| Republican hold | | | |

== District 4 ==
Incumbent David H. Watters, who was re-elected in 2024 with 60.45% of the vote, won re-election.

=== Democratic primary ===
Nominee

- David H. Watters, incumbent (2012-present)

=== Republican primary ===
Nominee

- Shawn Mickelonis, Former State Representative and nominee for this district in 2024

2026 New Hampshire Senate election, 4th District
| Party | Candidate | Votes | % |
|---|---|---|---|
| Democratic | David H. Watters (Incumbent) | 17,866 | 67.92 |
| Republican | Shawn Mickelonis | 8,422 | 32.02 |
| Write-in | | 16 | 0.06 |
| Total votes | | 26,304 | 100.0 |
| Democratic hold | | | |

== District 5 ==
Incumbent Suzanne Prentiss, who was re-elected in 2024 with 66.21% of the vote, won re-election.

=== Democratic primary ===
Nominee

- Suzanne Prentiss, incumbent (2020-present)

=== Republican primary ===
Nominee

- Conrad Schoeffter, New Hampshire Republican Party Vice Chair for Sullivan and Cheshire Counties

2026 New Hampshire Senate election, 5th District
| Party | Candidate | Votes | % |
|---|---|---|---|
| Democratic | Suzanne Prentiss (Incumbent) | 21,132 | 74.39 |
| Republican | Conrad Schoeffter | 7,262 | 25.57 |
| Write-in | | 11 | 0.04 |
| Total votes | | 28,405 | 100.0 |
| Democratic hold | | | |

== District 6 ==
Incumbent James P. Gray, who was re-elected in 2024 with 59.77% of the vote, won re-election.

=== Democratic primary ===
Nominee

- Cecil Abels, small business owner (suspended campaign October 19)

=== Republican primary ===
Nominee

- James P. Gray, incumbent (2016-present)

2026 New Hampshire Senate election, 6th District
| Party | Candidate | Votes | % |
|---|---|---|---|
| Republican | James P. Gray (Incumbent) | 12,245 | 51.57 |
| Democratic | Cecil Abels (withdrawn) | 11,456 | 48.25 |
| Write-in | | 42 | 0.18 |
| Total votes | | 23,743 | 100.0 |
| Republican hold | | | |

== District 7 ==
Incumbent Dan Innis, who was re-elected in 2024 with 55.48% of the vote, stated that he was retiring to run for U.S. Senate but later dropped out and endorsed former Senator John Sununu and ran for re-election. He was defeated by scientist Rebecca Harned.

=== Republican primary ===
Nominee

- Dan Innis, incumbent (2022-present)

Withdrew before primary

- Scott Maltzie, Professor at Lakes Region Community College

=== Democratic primary ===
Nominee

- Rebecca Harned, research scientist at Fire Safety Research Institute

2026 New Hampshire Senate election, 7th District
| Party | Candidate | Votes | % |
|---|---|---|---|
| Democratic | Rebecca Harned | 13,174 | 51.69 |
| Republican | Dan Innis (incumbent) | 12,285 | 48.20 |
| Write-in | | 30 | 0.11 |
| Total votes | | 25,489 | 100.0 |
| Democratic gain from Republican | | | |

== District 8 ==
Incumbent Ruth Ward, who was re-elected in 2024 with 58.25% of the vote, retired.

Democratic primary

Nominee

- David Trumble, organic farmer, college debate coach, and candidate for this district in 2024

Republican primary

Nominee

- Jim Creighton, U.S. army veteran and state representative (2020-present)

Declined

- Ruth Ward, incumbent (2016-present)

2026 New Hampshire Senate election, 8th District
| Party | Candidate | Votes | % |
|---|---|---|---|
| Republican | Jim Creighton | 12,539 | 50.76 |
| Democratic | David Trumble | 12,150 | 49.18 |
| Write-in | | 15 | 0.06 |
| Total votes | | 24,704 | 100.0 |
| Republican hold | | | |

== District 9 ==
Incumbent Denise Ricciardi, who was re-elected in 2024 with 51.49% of the vote, lost re-election.

=== Democratic primary ===
Nominee

- Matthew McLaughlin, airline pilot

=== Republican primary ===
Nominee

- Denise Ricciardi, incumbent (2020-present)

2026 New Hampshire Senate election, 9th District
| Party | Candidate | Votes | % |
|---|---|---|---|
| Democratic | Matthew McLaughlin | 14,352 | 53.55 |
| Republican | Denise Ricciardi (incumbent) | 12,417 | 46.33 |
| Write-in | | 34 | 0.12 |
| Total votes | | 26,803 | 100.0 |
| Democratic gain from Republican | | | |

== District 10 ==
Incumbent Donovan Fenton, who was re-elected in 2024 with 63.12% of the vote, won re-election unopposed.

=== Democratic primary ===
Nominee

- Donovan Fenton, incumbent (2022-present)

2026 New Hampshire Senate election, 10th District
| Party | Candidate | Votes | % |
|---|---|---|---|
| Democratic | Donovan Fenton | 19,848 | 98.57 |
| Write-in | | 287 | 1.43 |
| Total votes | | 20,135 | 100.0 |
| Democratic hold | | | |

== District 11 ==
Incumbent Tim McGough, who was first elected in 2024 with 50.90% of the vote, lost re-election.

=== Democratic primary ===
Nominee

- Shannon Chandley, former senator for this seat (2018-2020, 2022-2024)

=== Republican primary ===
Nominee

- Tim McGough, incumbent (2024-present)

2026 New Hampshire Senate election, 11th District
| Party | Candidate | Votes | % |
|---|---|---|---|
| Democratic | Shannon Chandley | 16,651 | 57.96 |
| Republican | Tim McGough (incumbent) | 12,038 | 41.91 |
| Write-in | | 47 | 0.13 |
| Total votes | | 28,726 | 100.0 |
| Democratic gain from Republican | | | |

== District 12 ==
Incumbent Kevin Avard, who was re-elected in 2024 with 55.88% of the vote, lost re-election.

Democratic primary

Nominee

- Carryl Roy, Member of the Hollis, New Hampshire school board

=== Republican primary ===
Nominee

- Kevin Avard, incumbent (2020-present)

2026 New Hampshire Senate election, 12th District
| Party | Candidate | Votes | % |
|---|---|---|---|
| Democratic | Carryl Roy | 14,701 | 52.03 |
| Republican | Kevin Avard (incumbent) | 13,527 | 47.87 |
| Write-in | | 28 | 0.10 |
| Total votes | | 28,256 | 100.0 |
| Democratic gain from Republican | | | |

== District 13 ==
Incumbent Cindy Rosenwald, who was re-elected in 2024 with 56.72% of the vote, retired.

Democratic primary

Nominee

- Laura Telerski, State Representative and Deputy House Minority Leader

Declined

- Cindy Rosenwald, incumbent (2020-present)

=== Republican primary ===
Nominee

- Daniel J. Paul, candidate for this seat in 2022

2026 New Hampshire Senate election, 8th District
| Party | Candidate | Votes | % |
|---|---|---|---|
| Democratic | Laura Telerski | 12,210 | 64.25 |
| Republican | Daniel J. Paul | 6,774 | 35.65 |
| Write-in | | 20 | 0.10 |
| Total votes | | 19,004 | 100.0 |
| Democratic hold | | | |

== District 14 ==
Incumbent Sharon Carson, who was re-elected in 2024 with 58.76% of the vote, won re-election.

=== Democratic primary ===
Nominee

- Timothy Wyatt, candidate for state representative in 2024

=== Republican primary ===
Nominee

- Sharon Carson, incumbent (2008-present)

2024 New Hampshire Senate election, 14th District
| Party | Candidate | Votes | % |
|---|---|---|---|
| Republican | Sharon Carson | 12,959 | 50.91 |
| Democratic | Timothy Wyatt | 12,482 | 49.03 |
| Write-in | | 15 | 0.06 |
| Total votes | | 25,456 | 100.0 |
| Republican hold | | | |

== District 15 ==
Incumbent Tara Reardon, who was elected in 2024 with 62.89% of the vote, won re-election.

=== Democratic primary ===
Nominee

- Tara Reardon, incumbent (2024-present)

=== Republican primary ===
Nominee

- Dennis Blankenbeker, candidate for state representative in 2024

2026 New Hampshire Senate election, 15th District
| Party | Candidate | Votes | % |
|---|---|---|---|
| Democratic | Tara Reardon | 18,751 | 71.45 |
| Republican | Dennis Blankenbeker | 7,472 | 28.47 |
| Write-in | | 21 | 0.08 |
| Total votes | | 26,244 | 100.0 |
| Democratic hold | | | |

== District 16 ==
Incumbent Keith Murphy, who was re-elected in 2024 with 56.63% of the vote, lost reelection.

Democratic primary

Nominee

- Dian McCarthy, small business owner and former member of the Goffstown, New Hampshire school board

Lost primary

- David DePuy, candidate for state representative in 2024

Democratic primary results
| Party | Candidate | Votes | % |
|---|---|---|---|
| Democratic | Dian McCarthy | 4,314 | 79.4 |
| Democratic | Dennis Blankenbeker | 1,102 | 20.3 |
| Write-in | | 20 | 0.1 |
| Total votes | | 5,436 | 100.0 |

Republican primary

Nominee

- Keith Murphy, incumbent (2022-present)

Lost primary

- Anthony Clements, member of the Raymond, New Hampshire school board

Republican primary results
| Party | Candidate | Votes | % |
|---|---|---|---|
| Republican | Keith Murphy | 3,284 | 71.3 |
| Republican | Anthony Clements | 1,281 | 27.8 |
| Write-in | | 43 | 0.9 |
| Total votes | | 4,608 | 100.0 |

=== General election ===
2026 New Hampshire Senate election, 16th District
| Party | Candidate | Votes | % |
|---|---|---|---|
| Democratic | Dian McCarthy | 13,386 | 52.44 |
| Republican | Keith Murphy (incumbent) | 12,119 | 47.48 |
| Write-in | | 21 | 0.08 |
| Total votes | | 25,526 | 100.0 |
| Democratic gain from Republican | | | |

== District 17 ==
Incumbent Howard Pearl, who was re-elected in 2024 with 57.72% of the vote, won re-election.

=== Democratic primary ===
Nominee

- Robert Lawliss, U.S. Army veteran, engineer, and EMT

=== Republican primary ===
Nominee

- Howard Pearl, incumbent (2022-present)

Lost primary

- Julie Smith, perennial candidate

Republican primary results
| Party | Candidate | Votes | % |
|---|---|---|---|
| Republican | Howard Pearl (incumbent) | 3,350 | 61.9 |
| Republican | Julie Smith | 2,043 | 37.7 |
| Write-in | | 22 | 0.4 |
| Total votes | | 5,415 | 100.0 |

=== General election ===
2026 New Hampshire Senate election, 17th District
| Party | Candidate | Votes | % |
|---|---|---|---|
| Republican | Howard Pearl (incumbent) | 13,842 | 51.99 |
| Democratic | Robert Lawliss | 12,752 | 47.89 |
| Write-in | | 31 | 0.12 |
| Total votes | | 26,625 | 100.0 |
| Republican hold | | | |

== District 18 ==
Incumbent Victoria Sullivan, who was re-elected in 2024 with 51.42% of the vote, lost re-election.

Democratic primary

Nominee

- Leonard Bell, Southern New Hampshire University faculty member

Declined

- Donna Soucy, former state senator from this district

=== Republican primary ===
Nominee

- Victoria Sullivan, incumbent (2024-present)

2026 New Hampshire Senate election, 18th District
| Party | Candidate | Votes | % |
|---|---|---|---|
| Democratic | Leonard Bell | 10,709 | 54.96 |
| Republican | Victoria Sullivan (incumbent) | 8,758 | 44.94 |
| Write-in | | 20 | 0.10 |
| Total votes | | 19,487 | 100.0 |
| Democratic gain from Republican | | | |

== District 19 ==
Incumbent Regina Birdsell, who was re-elected in 2024 with 60.76% of the vote, won re-election.

=== Democratic primary ===
Nominee

- Michelle Moge, candidate for this seat in 2024

=== Republican primary ===
Nominee

- Regina Birdsell, incumbent (2014-present)

2026 New Hampshire Senate election, 19th District
| Party | Candidate | Votes | % |
|---|---|---|---|
| Republican | Howard Pearl (incumbent) | 12,761 | 52.54 |
| Democratic | Michelle Moge | 11,514 | 47.41 |
| Write-in | | 13 | 0.05 |
| Total votes | | 24,288 | 100.0 |
| Republican hold | | | |

== District 20 ==
Incumbent Pat Long, who was elected in 2024 with 56.05% of the vote, won re-election.

Democratic primary

Nominee

- Pat Long, incumbent (2024-present)

Lost primary

- Matthew Ping, candidate for state representative in 2024

Democratic primary results
| Party | Candidate | Votes | % |
|---|---|---|---|
| Democratic | Pat Long (incumbent) | 3,607 | 80.5 |
| Democratic | Matthew Ping | 859 | 19.2 |
| Write-in | | 16 | 0.4 |
| Total votes | | 4,482 | 100.0 |

=== Republican primary ===
Nominee

- Patrick Binder, carpenter

2026 New Hampshire Senate election, 19th District
| Party | Candidate | Votes | % |
|---|---|---|---|
| Democratic | Pat Long (incumbent) | 11,433 | 65.64 |
| Republican | Patrick Binder | 5,967 | 34.26 |
| Write-in | | 18 | 0.10 |
| Total votes | | 17,418 | 100.0 |
| Democratic hold | | | |

== District 21 ==
Incumbent Rebecca Perkins Kwoka, who was re-elected in 2024 with 66.89% of the vote, won re-election.

=== Democratic primary ===
Nominee

- Rebecca Perkins Kwoka, incumbent (2020-present)

=== Republican primary ===
Nominee

- Jeffrey Berlin, election integrity activist and alleged illegal voter

2026 New Hampshire Senate election, 21st District
| Party | Candidate | Votes | % |
|---|---|---|---|
| Democratic | Rebecca Perkins Kwoka (incumbent) | 20,447 | 74.01 |
| Republican | Jeffrey Berlin | 7,160 | 25.91 |
| Write-in | | 22 | 0.08 |
| Total votes | | 27,629 | 100.0 |
| Democratic hold | | | |

== District 22 ==
Incumbent Daryl Abbas, who was re-elected in 2024 with 63.92% of the vote, won re-election.

Republican primary

Nominee

- Daryl Abbas, incumbent (2024-present)

Democratic primary

Nominee

- Chris Tardif, chair of the Atkinson, New Hampshire trustees of trust funds

2026 New Hampshire Senate election, 22nd District
| Party | Candidate | Votes | % |
|---|---|---|---|
| Republican | Daryl Abbas (incumbent) | 15,267 | 55.79 |
| Democratic | Chris Tardif | 12,096 | 44.20 |
| Write-in | | 4 | 0.01 |
| Total votes | | 27,367 | 100.0 |
| Republican hold | | | |

== District 23 ==
Incumbent Bill Gannon, who was re-elected in 2024 with 62.36% of the vote, won re-election.

=== Democratic primary ===
Nominee

- David Childs

=== Republican primary ===
Nominee

- Bill Gannon, incumbent (2020-present)

2026 New Hampshire Senate election, 23rd District
| Party | Candidate | Votes | % |
|---|---|---|---|
| Republican | Bill Gannon (incumbent) | 16,112 | 56.24 |
| Democratic | David Childs | 12,518 | 43.69 |
| Write-in | | 20 | 0.07 |
| Total votes | | 28,650 | 100.0 |
| Republican hold | | | |

== District 24 ==
Incumbent Debra Altschiller, who was re-elected in 2024 with 54.74% of the vote, considered running for Congress but ultimately decided to run for reelection.

Democratic primary

Nominee

- Debra Altschiller, incumbent (2022-present)

Republican primary

Nominee

- Lou Gargiulo, former state representative (1992-1996) and candidate for this district in 2020

2026 New Hampshire Senate election, 24th District
| Party | Candidate | Votes | % |
|---|---|---|---|
| Democratic | Debra Altschiller (incumbent) | 19,403 | 60.45 |
| Republican | Lou Gargiulo | 12,681 | 39.51 |
| Write-in | | 13 | 0.04 |
| Total votes | | 32,097 | 100.0 |
| Democratic hold | | | |
