= 2022 New Hampshire Senate election =

- November 8, 2022

All 24 seats in the New Hampshire Senate 13 seats needed for a majority

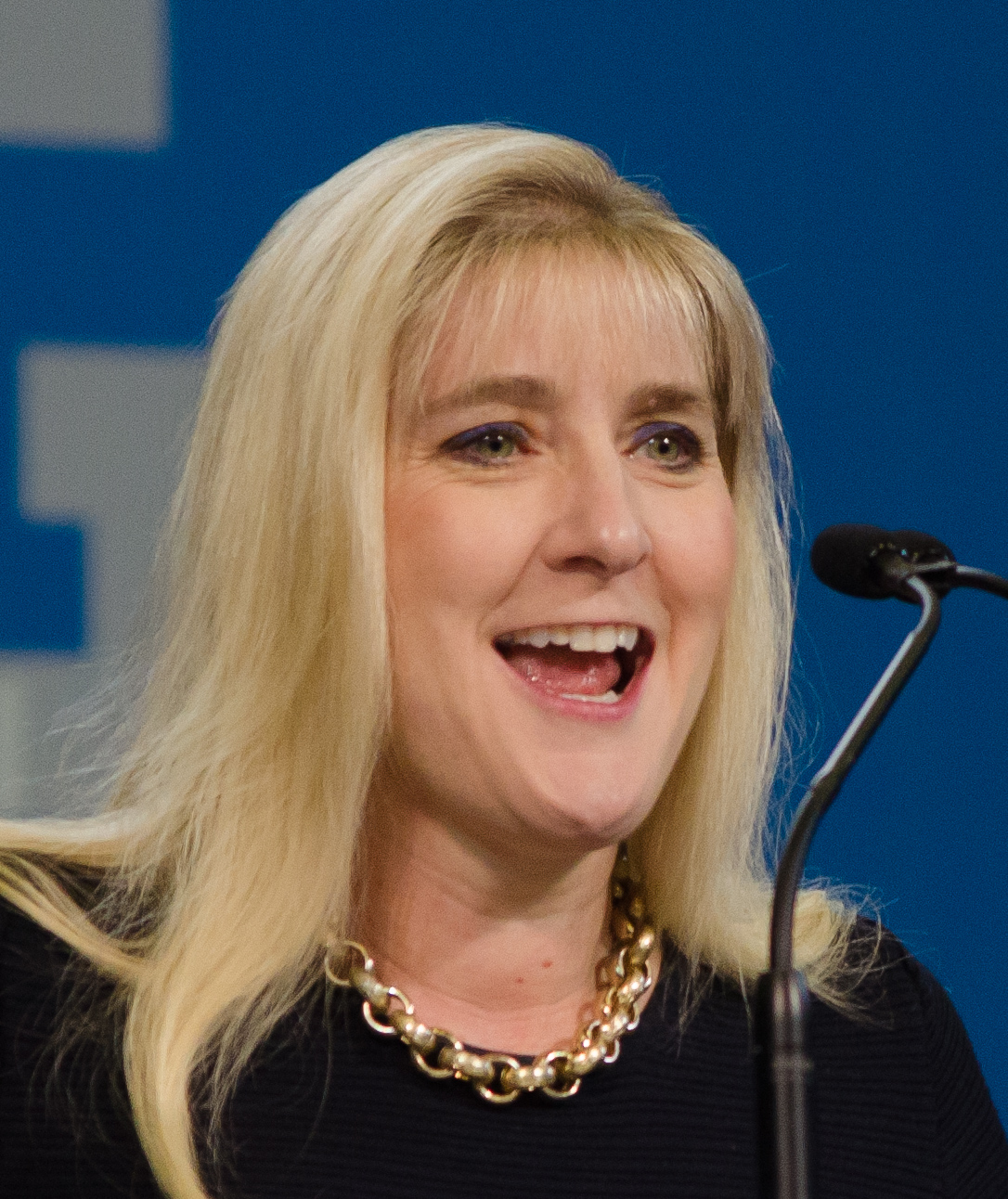
	Majority party	Minority party
Leader	Chuck Morse (retired)	Donna Soucy
Party	Republican	Democratic
Leader's seat	22nd District	18th District
Seats before	14	10
Seats after	14	10
Seat change	Steady	Steady
Popular vote	293,304	299,361
Percentage	49.5%	50.5%
- Results: Republican gain Democratic gain Republican hold Democratic hold Vote share: 50–60% 60–70% >90% 50–60% 60–70% >90%
President before election
Chuck Morse
Republican
Elected President
Jeb Bradley
Republican

The 2022 New Hampshire Senate elections took place as part of the biennial 2022 United States elections. New Hampshire voters elected state senators in all of the state's 24 senate districts. State senators serve two-year terms in the New Hampshire Senate, with all of the seats up for election each cycle. The primary elections held on September 13, 2022, determined which candidates would appear on the November 8, 2022, general election ballot.

== Composition ==
Affiliation	Party (Shading indicates majority caucus)		Total	
Affiliation	Democratic	Republican	Total	Vacant
Before election	10	13	23	1
After election	10	14	24	0

== Summary ==
District	Incumbent	Party	Elected Senator	Party
1st	Erin Hennessey	Rep	Carrie Gendreau	Rep
2nd	Bob Giuda	Rep	Timothy Lang Sr.	Rep
3rd	Jeb Bradley	Rep	Jeb Bradley	Rep
4th	David H. Watters	Dem	David H. Watters	Dem
5th	Suzanne Prentiss	Dem	Suzanne Prentiss	Dem
6th	James P. Gray	Rep	James P. Gray	Rep
7th	Harold F. French	Rep	Dan Innis	Rep
8th	Ruth Ward	Rep	Ruth Ward	Rep
9th	Denise Ricciardi	Rep	Denise Ricciardi	Rep
10th	Jay Kahn	Dem	Donovan Fenton	Dem
11th	Gary Daniels	Rep	Shannon Chandley	Dem
12th	Kevin Avard	Rep	Kevin Avard	Rep
13th	Cindy Rosenwald	Dem	Cindy Rosenwald	Dem
14th	Sharon Carson	Rep	Sharon Carson	Rep
15th	Becky Whitley	Dem	Becky Whitley	Dem
16th	Kevin Cavanaugh	Dem	Keith Murphy	Rep
17th	John Reagan	Rep	Howard Pearl	Rep
18th	Donna Soucy	Dem	Donna Soucy	Dem
19th	Regina Birdsell	Rep	Regina Birdsell	Rep
20th	Lou D'Allesandro	Dem	Lou D'Allesandro	Dem
21st	Rebecca Perkins Kwoka	Dem	Rebecca Perkins Kwoka	Dem
22nd	Chuck Morse	Rep	Daryl Abbas	Rep
23rd	Bill Gannon	Rep	Bill Gannon	Rep
24th	Tom Sherman	Dem	Debra Altschiller	Dem

== Close races ==
District	Winner	Margin
District 2	Republican	12.00%
District 1	Republican	9.42%
District 6	Republican	11.58%
District 7	Republican	9.24%
District 8	Republican	14.48%
District 9	Republican	4.46%
District 11	Democratic (flip)	2.62%
District 12	Republican	2.46%
District 13	Democratic	17.6%
District 14	Republican	18.16%
District 16	Republican (flip)	6.76%
District 17	Republican	13.62%
District 18	Democratic	4.78%
District 20	Democratic	15.78%
District 24	Democratic	11.32%

== Outgoing incumbents ==
=== Retiring ===
- Erin Hennessey (R-Littleton), representing District 1 since 2020, was retiring.
- Bob Giuda (R-Warren), representing District 2 since 2016, was retiring.
- Harold F. French (R-Franklin), representing District 7 since 2016, was retiring.
- Jay Kahn (D-Keene), representing District 10 since 2016, was retiring.
- John Reagan (R-Deerfield), representing District 17 since 2012, was retiring.

=== Seeking another office ===
- Kevin Cavanaugh (D-Manchester), representing District 16 since 2017, was not seeking reelection to the Senate in order to run for Executive Council in the 4th district.
- Chuck Morse (R–Salem), representing District 22 since 2010, was not seeking reelection to the Senate in order to run for U.S. Senate.
- Tom Sherman (D-Rye), representing District 24 since 2018, was not seeking reelection to the Senate in order to run for governor.

== Predictions ==
Source	Ranking	As of
Sabato's Crystal Ball	Likely R	October 28, 2022

== Districts ==
Source:

== District 1 ==
=== Candidates ===
Republican

- Carrie Gendreau, selectwoman for Littleton since 2018
- ~~Troy Merner, incumbent state representative for Coos District 7 since 2016~~

Democratic

- Edith Tucker, incumbent state representative for Coos District 5 since 2016

==== Results ====
General election

State Senate District 1 general election, 2022
Party	Candidate	Votes	%
Republican	Carrie Gendreau	13,112	54.71
Democratic	Edith Tucker	10,855	45.29
Total votes		23,967	100.0

== District 2 ==
=== Candidates ===
Republican

- Dave DeVoy, Republican candidate in 2020
- Timothy Lang Sr., incumbent state representative for Belknap District 4 since 2016
- John Plumer, former state representative

Democratic

- Kate Miller, former Democratic state representative (2008–2010)

Results

General election

State Senate District 2 general election, 2022
Party	Candidate	Votes	%
Republican	Timothy Lang	15,321	56.0
Democratic	Kate Miller	12,038	44.0
Total votes		27,359	100.0

== District 3 ==
=== Candidates ===
Republican

- Jeb Bradley, incumbent state senator since 2009, former Majority Leader (2010–2018), former U.S. representative from New Hampshire's 1st congressional district (2003–2007)
- Nancy Cunning

Democratic

- William Marsh, incumbent state representative for Carroll District 8 since 2016

==== Results ====
General election

State Senate District 3 general election, 2022
Party	Candidate	Votes	%
Republican	Jeb Bradley (incumbent)	17,336	58.48
Democratic	William Marsh	12,309	41.52
Total votes		29,645	100.0

== District 4 ==
=== Candidates ===
Republican

- Seamus Casey, candidate for state representative in 2014 and 2016

Democratic

- David H. Watters, incumbent state senator since 2012, previously served two terms in the N.H. House of Representatives for Strafford District 4

==== Results ====
General election

State Senate District 4 general election, 2022
Party	Candidate	Votes	%
Democratic	David H. Watters (incumbent)	15,879	63.30
Republican	Seamus Casey	9,207	36.70
Total votes		25,086	100.0

== District 5 ==
=== Candidates ===
Republican

- John McIntyre

Democratic

- Suzanne Prentiss, incumbent state senator since 2020, former mayor of Lebanon (2017–2019) and Lebanon city councilor since 2009

==== Results ====
General election

State Senate District 5 general election, 2022
Party	Candidate	Votes	%
Democratic	Suzanne Prentiss (incumbent)	19,269	69.0
Republican	John McIntyre	8,656	31.0
Total votes		27,925	100.0

== District 6 ==
=== Candidates ===
Republican

- James Gray, incumbent state senator since 2016

Democratic

- Ruth Larson, candidate for state representative in 2018 and 2020

==== Results ====
General election

State Senate District 6 general election, 2022
Party	Candidate	Votes	%
Republican	James Gray (incumbent)	13,167	55.79
Democratic	Ruth Larson	10,434	44.21
Total votes		23,601	100.0

== District 7 ==
=== Candidates ===
Republican

- Thomas Dunne Jr., candidate for state representative in 2016, 2018 and 2020
- Dan Innis, former state senator for District 24 (2016–2018)

Democratic

- Richard Lobban Jr., candidate for Grafton District 9 in 2020

Results

General election

State Senate District 7 general election, 2022
Party	Candidate	Votes	%	±%
Republican	Daniel E. Innis	13,413	54.62	
Democratic	Richard A. Lobban, Jr.	11,146	45.38	
Total votes		24,559	100	

== District 8 ==
=== Candidates ===
Republican

- Ruth Ward, incumbent state senator since 2016

Democratic

- Charlene Lovett, former non-partisan mayor of Claremont (2016–2021) and former Republican state representative for Sullivan District 4 (2010–2012)

==== Results ====
General election

State Senate District 8 general election, 2022
Party	Candidate	Votes	%
Republican	Ruth Ward (incumbent)	14,080	57.2
Democratic	Charlene Lovett	10,520	42.7
Total votes		24,610	100.0

== District 9 ==
=== Candidates ===
Republican

- Denise Ricciardi, incumbent state senator since 2020

Democratic

- Matthew McLaughlin

==== Results ====
General election

State Senate District 9 general election, 2022
Party	Candidate	Votes	%
Republican	Denise Ricciardi (incumbent)	13,687	52.2
Democratic	Matthew McLaughlin	12,510	47.7
Total votes		26,211	100.0

== District 10 ==
=== Candidates ===
Republican

- Ian Freeman, syndicated talk radio host
- Sly Karasinski, candidate for Cheshire District 12 in 2020

Democratic

- Donovan Fenton, incumbent state representative for Cheshire District 8 since 2016
- Bobby Williams, Keene city councilor

==== Results ====
General election

State Senate District 10 general election, 2022
Party	Candidate	Votes	%
Democratic	Donovan Fenton	17,305	66.14
Republican	Sly Karasinski	8,860	33.86
Total votes		26,165	100.0

== District 11 ==
=== Candidates ===
Republican

- Gary Daniels, incumbent state senator since 2020 (previously served 2014–2018)
- John Frechette

Democratic

- Shannon Chandley, former state senator (2018–2020)

==== Results ====
General election

State Senate District 10 general election, 2022
Party	Candidate	Votes	%
Democratic	Shannon Chandley	14,320	51.3
Republican	Gary Daniels	13,591	48.7
Total votes		27,911	100.0

== District 12 ==
=== Candidates ===
Republican

- Kevin Avard, incumbent state senator since 2020 (previously served 2014–2018)

Democratic

- Melanie Levesque, former state senator (2018–2020)

==== Results ====
General election

State Senate District 12 general election, 2022
Party	Candidate	Votes	%
Republican	Kevin Avard (incumbent)	14,314	51.2
Democratic	Melanie Levesque	13,626	48.8
Total votes		27,943	100.0

== District 13 ==
=== Candidates ===
Republican

- Daniel J. Paul
- Stephen Scaer

Democratic

- Cindy Rosenwald, incumbent state senator since 2018

==== Results ====
General election

State Senate District 13 general election, 2022
Party	Candidate	Votes	%
Democratic	Cindy Rosenwald (incumbent)	10,445	58.8
Republican	Stephen Scaer	7,319	41.2
Total votes		17,772	100.0

== District 14 ==
=== Candidates ===
Republican

- Sharon Carson, incumbent state senator since 2008

Democratic

- John Robinson

==== Results ====
General election

State Senate District 14 general election, 2022
Party	Candidate	Votes	%
Republican	Sharon Carson (incumbent)	14,631	59.1
Democratic	John Robinson	10,133	40.9
Total votes		24,776	100.0

== District 15 ==
=== Candidates ===
Republican

- Linda Rae Banfil

Democratic

- Becky Whitley, incumbent state senator since 2020

==== Results ====
General election

State Senate District 15 general election, 2022
Party	Candidate	Votes	%
Democratic	Becky Whitley (incumbent)	16,625	64.7
Republican	Linda Rae Banfil	9,071	35.3
Total votes		25,715	100.0

== District 16 ==
=== Candidates ===
Republican

- Barbara Griffin, incumbent state representative for Hillsborough District 6 since 2014
- Michael Yakubovich, incumbent state representative for Merrimack District 24 since 2018

Democratic

- June Trisciani, Manchester alderman at-large since 2021

==== Results ====
General election

State Senate District 16 general election, 2022
Party	Candidate	Votes	%
Republican	Keith Murphy	13,494	53.4
Democratic	June Trisciani	11,783	46.6
Total votes		25,301	100.0

== District 17 ==
=== Candidates ===
Republican

- Scott R. Bryer
- Howard Pearl, incumbent representative for Merrimack District 26 since 2016

Democratic

- Christine M. Tappan

==== Results ====
General election

State Senate District 17 general election, 2022
Party	Candidate	Votes	%
Republican	Howard Pearl	14,878	56.8
Democratic	Christine M. Tappan	11,311	43.2
Total votes		26,221	100.0

== District 18 ==
=== Candidates ===
Republican

- George Lambert, former state representative for Hillsborough District 44 (2010–2014), former candidate for governor in 2014 and candidate for District 18 in 2018
- Ross Terrio, former state representative for Hillsborough District 14 2010–2012; former member of the Manchester Board of School Committee 2013–2020

Democratic

- Donna Soucy, incumbent state senator since 2012

==== Results ====
General election

State Senate District 18 general election, 2022
Party	Candidate	Votes	%
Democratic	Donna Soucy (incumbent)	9,920	52.4
Republican	George Lambert	9,015	47.6
Total votes		18,961	100.0

== District 19 ==
=== Candidates ===
Republican

- Regina Birdsell, incumbent state senator since 2014

==== Results ====
General election

State Senate District 19 general election, 2022
Party	Candidate	Votes	%
Republican	Regina Birdsell (incumbent)	15,143	100.0
Total votes		15,253	100.0

== District 20 ==
=== Candidates ===
Republican

- Richard H. Girard, former member of the Manchester Board of School Committee (2015–2020) and former alderman Manchester Board of Mayor and Aldermen (1998–2000)

Democratic

- Lou D'Allesandro, incumbent state senator since 1998

==== Results ====
General election

State Senate District 20 general election, 2022
Party	Candidate	Votes	%
Democratic	Lou D'Allesandro (incumbent)	9,859	57.8
Republican	Richard H. Girard	7,172	42.0
Total votes		17,056	100.0

== District 21 ==
=== Candidates ===
Democratic

- Rebecca Perkins Kwoka, incumbent state senator since 2020

==== Results ====
General election

State Senate District 21 general election, 2022
Party	Candidate	Votes	%
Democratic	Rebecca Perkins Kwoka (incumbent)	20,084	100.0
Total votes		20,315	100.0

== District 22 ==
=== Candidates ===
Republican

- Daryl Abbas, incumbent state representative for Rockingham District 8 since 2018
- Peter Torosian, incumbent state representative for Rockingham District 14 since 2016

Democratic

- Wayne Haubner

==== Results ====
General election

State Senate District 22 general election, 2022
Party	Candidate	Votes	%
Republican	Daryl Abbas	16,622	62.6
Democratic	Wayne Haubner	9,927	37.4
Total votes		26,569	100.0

== District 23 ==
=== Candidates ===
Republican

- Bill Gannon, incumbent state senator since 2020 (previously served 2016–2018)
- ~~Daniel O'Shea~~

Democratic

- Brenda Oldak

==== Results ====
General election

State Senate District 23 general election, 2022
Party	Candidate	Votes	%
Democratic	Brenda Oldak	11,064	39.5
Republican	Bill Gannon (incumbent)	16,902	60.4
Total votes		27,981	100.0

== District 24 ==
=== Candidates ===
Republican

- Lou Gargiulo, former state representative (1992–1996)

Democratic

- Debra Altschiller, incumbent state representative for Rockingham District 19 since 2016

==== Results ====
General election

State Senate District 24 general election, 2022
Party	Candidate	Votes	%
Democratic	Debra Altschiller	18,020	55.7
Republican	Lou Gargiulo	14,308	44.3
Total votes		32,328	100.0

== See also ==
- 2022 New Hampshire elections
- 2022 United States elections
- New Hampshire Senate
- Elections in New Hampshire
- List of New Hampshire General Courts
