= 2018 New Hampshire Senate election =

2018 New Hampshire Senate elections
- November 6, 2018

All 24 seats in the New Hampshire Senate 13 seats needed for a majority
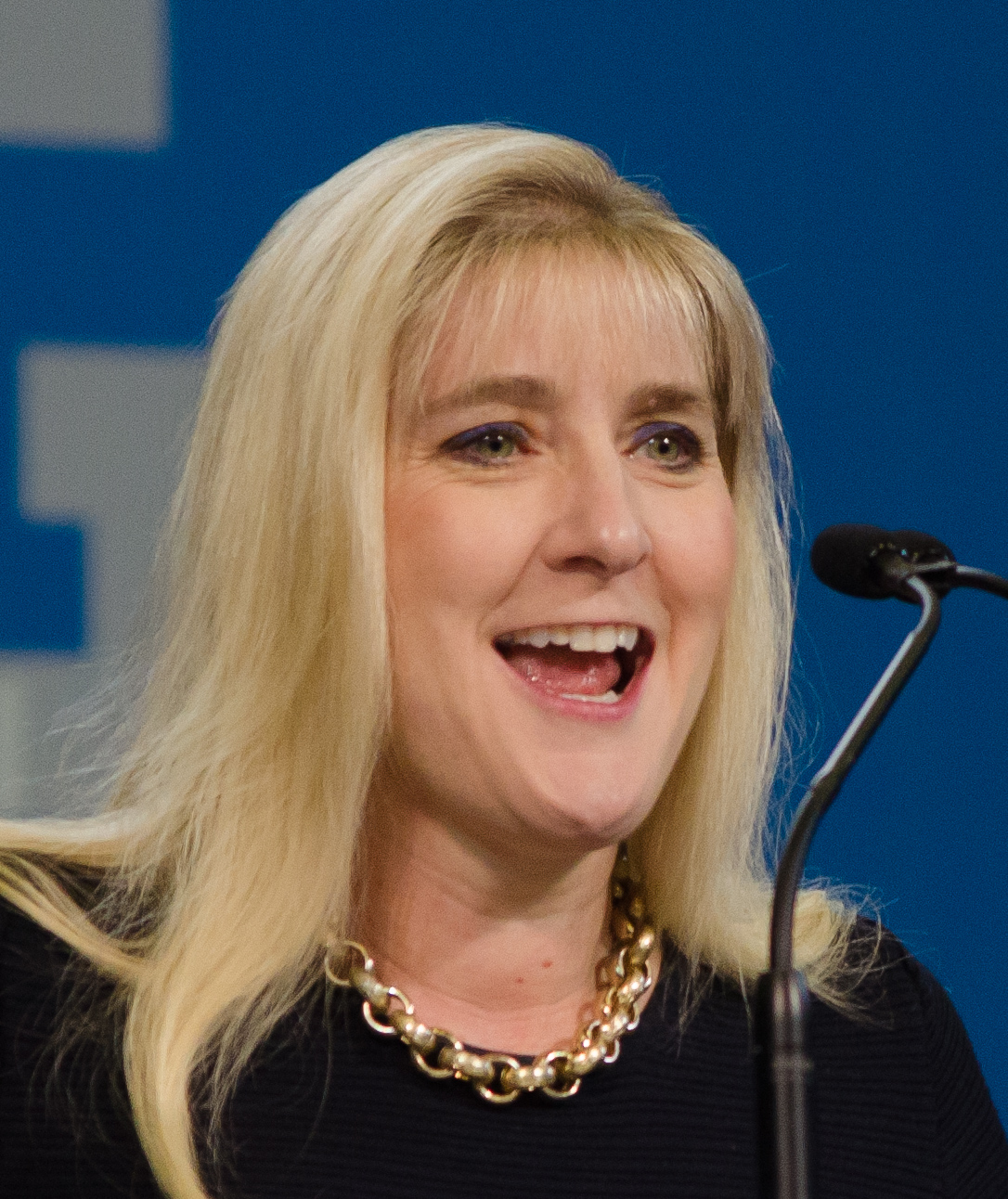

	Majority party	Minority party
Leader	Donna Soucy	Chuck Morse
Party	Democratic	Republican
Leader since	August 6, 2018	September 3, 2013
Leader's seat	18th	22nd
Last election	10	14
Seats won	14	10
Seat change	▲4	▼4
Popular vote	296,608	253,434
Percentage	53.9%	46.1%
Swing	▲4.1%	▼4.4%
- Results: Democratic gain Republican gain Democratic hold Republican hold
President of the Senate before election
Chuck Morse
Republican
Elected President of the Senate
Donna Soucy
Democratic

The 2018 New Hampshire Senate election was held on November 6, 2018, concurrently with the elections for the New Hampshire House of Representatives, to elect members to the 166th New Hampshire General Court. All 24 seats in the New Hampshire Senate were up for election. It resulted in Democrats gaining control of both chambers of the New Hampshire General Court, ending the total control of New Hampshire's state government that Republicans had held since the 2016 elections.

Primary elections were held on September 11, 2018. This was the last time until 2026 that Republicans did not win majorities in both of New Hampshire's state legislative chambers.

== Background ==
In the 2016 New Hampshire state elections, Republicans retained their majority in the State Senate by a margin of 14–10, with neither party making net gains. Republicans also maintained control of the New Hampshire House of Representatives. In addition, Republican Chris Sununu won the open 2016 gubernatorial election, giving the Republican Party total control of the state government for the first time since 2005.

In the aftermath of his 2016 election, then president-elect Donald Trump claimed in a tweet that voter fraud had occurred in New Hampshire. In February 2017, Trump advisor Stephen Miller reaffirmed that position by claiming "busing voters in to New Hampshire is widely known by anyone who’s worked in New Hampshire politics". These claims were called "baseless" by several observers.

In response to those allegations, the Republican majorities in the New Hampshire General Court drafted bills changing voter registration rules. Senate Bill 3 (SB 3) passed both chambers of the New Hampshire General Court on party-line votes and was signed in to law by Governor Sununu on July 10, 2017. The new law requires voters to declare a "domicile" in New Hampshire. It also included jail sentences of up to one year or a fine of up to $5,000, if voters registered and not provided necessary paperwork as proof within 10 day or 30 days in smaller towns. Republicans pointed to over 5,000 voters who voted in the 2016 election after identifying with an out-of-state driver's licence, that have not gotten an in-state licence as of September 2017. Democrats suspected a voter suppression scheme, that targeted college students, that they think are most likely to use identification issued by other states.

The League of Women Voters, the New Hampshire Democratic Party and several college students challenged the new law in court. They pointed to the Supreme Court's decision in Symm v. United States, that guaranteed college students the right to vote at their university. The trial judge of the Hillsborough Superior Court decided on October 22, 2018, that the state cannot apply the law in the upcoming elections. The Attorney General of New Hampshire's office then filed an emergency motion with the New Hampshire Supreme Court. The State Supreme Court sided with the state in a unanimous 5-0 decision arguing that overturning the law so close to elections was potentially confusing and disruptive. The State Supreme Court did not decide on the merits of the law in this decision. Therefore, SB3 was first applied in the 2018 elections.

== Predictions ==
Source	Ranking	As of
Governing	Lean D (flip)	October 8, 2018

== Results ==
=== Analysis ===
In the 2018 elections, Democrats saw gains in state elections across the countries, gaining multiple Governorships and legislative chambers. Democrats also won control of the United States House of Representatives for the first time since 2008. Commentators called the election results a "blue wave", that was especially pronounced in state elections.

In the New Hampshire Senate, Democrats were able to flip Districts 9, 11, 12, 23 and 24, while the Republicans flipped District 1. The Democratic gains were mostly in less rural areas in Southern and Eastern New Hampshire while the Republican gains were limited to the rural Senate District 1 in the North Country. The incumbent Democratic senator in District 1, Jeff Woodburn, had been accused of domestic violence and criminally charged a few months before the election.

=== Overview ===
↓
14	10
Democratic	Republican

Source: Official results.

Parties	Candidates	Seats				Popular vote		
Parties	Candidates	2016	2018	+/-	Strength	Vote	%	Change
Democratic	24	10	14	▲4	58.33%	296,608	53.77%	▲4.13%
Republican	23	14	10	▼4	41.67%	253,412	45.94%	▼4.42%
Libertarian	3	0	0	Steady	0.00%	1,461	0.26%	▲0.26%
Independent	1	0	0	Steady	0.00%	1,103	0.03%	▲0.03%
Total	51	24	24	0	100.00%	551,629	100.00%	-

=== Detailed results ===
==== District 1 ====
Incumbent Democratic state senator Jeff Woodburn had represented the New Hampshire's 1st State Senate District since 2012. Senator Woodburn had also served as Senate Minority Leader since 2014. Woodburn was arrested on August 2, 2018, on simple assault, domestic violence, criminal mischief, and criminal trespass charges. Democratic Party Chairman Raymond Buckley called on him to resign. On August 6, Woodburn announced he would resign as the minority leader but would remain as a senator. He won the Democratic primary on September 11, 2018, but was defeated by Republican David Starr in the 2018 general election.

2018 New Hampshire State Senate election, District 1
Party	Candidate	Votes	%
Republican	David Starr	10,560	54.3
Democratic	Jeff Woodburn (incumbent)	8,739	44.9
Independent	Kathleen Kelley (write-in)	148	0.8
Total votes		19,447	100
Republican gain from Democratic			

==== District 2 ====
Incumbent Republican state senator Bob Giuda had represented the New Hampshire's 2nd State Senate District since 2016. He won reelection against Democrat Bill Bolton.

2018 New Hampshire State Senate election, District 2
Party	Candidate	Votes	%
Republican	Bob Giuda (incumbent)	12,127	51.6
Democratic	Bill Bolton	11,376	48.4
Total votes		23,503	100
Republican hold			

==== District 3 ====
Incumbent Republican state senator Jeb Bradley had represented the New Hampshire's 3rd State Senate District since 2009. He won reelection against Democrat Christopher Meier and Libertarian Tania Butler.

2018 New Hampshire State Senate election, District 3
Primary election
Party	Candidate	Votes	%
Republican	Jeb Bradley (incumbent)	4,326	77.4
Republican	Steven Steiner	1,262	22.6
Total votes		5,588	100
General election
Republican	Jeb Bradley (incumbent)	14,841	56.6
Democratic	Christopher Meier	10,895	41.5
Libertarian	Tania Butler	506	1.9
Total votes		26,242	100
Republican hold			

==== District 4 ====
Incumbent Democrat State Senator David Watters had represented the New Hampshire's 4th State Senate District since 2012. He was reelected without opposition.

2018 New Hampshire State Senate election, District 4
Party	Candidate	Votes	%
Democratic	David Watters (incumbent)	15,299	100
Total votes		15,299	100
Democratic hold			

==== District 5 ====
Incumbent Democratic state senator Martha Hennessey had represented the New Hampshire's 5th State Senate District since 2016. She won reelection against Republican Patrick Lozito.

2018 New Hampshire State Senate election, District 5
Party	Candidate	Votes	%
Democratic	Martha Hennessey (incumbent)	16,932	71.2
Republican	Patrick Lozito	6,862	28.8
Total votes		23,794	100
Democratic hold			

==== District 6 ====
Incumbent Republican state senator James Gray had represented the New Hampshire's 6th State Senate District since 2016. He won reelection against Democrat Anne Grassie.

2018 New Hampshire State Senate election, District 6
Party	Candidate	Votes	%
Republican	James Gray (incumbent)	11,602	54.9
Democratic	Anne Grassie	9,537	45.1
Total votes		21,139	100
Republican hold			

==== District 7 ====
Incumbent Republican state senator Harold F. French had represented the New Hampshire's 7th State Senate District since 2016. He won reelection against Democrat Mason Donovan.

2018 New Hampshire State Senate election, District 7
Party	Candidate	Votes	%
Republican	Harold French (incumbent)	11,616	53.4
Democratic	Mason Donovan	10,141	46.6
Total votes		21,757	100
Republican hold			

==== District 8 ====
Incumbent Republican state senator Ruth Ward had represented the New Hampshire's 8th State Senate District since 2016. She won reelection against Democrat Jenn Alford-Teaster.

2018 New Hampshire State Senate election, District 8
Party	Candidate	Votes	%
Republican	Ruth Ward (incumbent)	12,859	51.3
Democratic	Jenn Alford-Teaster	12,212	48.7
Total votes		25,071	100
Republican hold			

==== District 9 ====
Incumbent Republican state senator Andy Sanborn had represented the New Hampshire's 9th State Senate District since 2010. He did not run for reelection in 2018. Instead, he ran unsuccessfully in the Republican primary for New Hampshire's 1st congressional district. The open seat was won by Democrat Jeanne Dietsch against Republican Dan Hynes.

2018 New Hampshire State Senate election, District 9
Primary election
Party	Candidate	Votes	%
Democratic	Jeanne Dietsch	3,728	54.6
Democratic	Mark Fernald	2,219	32.5
Democratic	Bruce Fox	884	12.9
Total votes		6,831	100
Republican	Dan Hynes	2,699	53.1
Republican	Terry Wolf	2,382	46.9
Total votes		5,081	100
General election
Democratic	Jeanne Dietsch	14,037	52.4
Republican	Dan Hynes	12,776	47.6
Total votes		26,813	100
Democratic gain from Republican			

==== District 10 ====
Incumbent Democratic state senator Jay Kahn had represented the New Hampshire's 10th State Senate District since 2016. He won reelection against Republican Dan LeClair and Libertarian Ian Freeman.

2018 New Hampshire State Senate election, District 10
Party	Candidate	Votes	%
Democratic	Jay Kahn (incumbent)	15,036	65.1
Republican	Dan LeClair	7,538	32.7
Libertarian	Ian Freeman	507	2.2
Total votes		23,081	100
Democratic hold			

==== District 11 ====
Incumbent Republican state senator Gary L. Daniels had represented the New Hampshire's 11th State Senate District since 2014. He was defeated for reelection by Democratic state representative Shannon Chandley.

2018 New Hampshire State Senate election, District 11
Primary election
Party	Candidate	Votes	%
Democratic	Shannon Chandley	3,917	83.1
Democratic	Roger Tilton	797	16.9
Total votes		4,714	100
General election
Democratic	Shannon Chandley	13,361	52.3
Republican	Gary L. Daniels (incumbent)	12,205	47.7
Total votes		25,566	100
Democratic gain from Republican			

==== District 12 ====
Incumbent Republican state senator Kevin Avard had represented the New Hampshire's 12th State Senate District since 2014. He was defeated for reelection by former Democratic state representative Melanie Levesque.

2018 New Hampshire State Senate election, District 12
Primary election
Party	Candidate	Votes	%
Democratic	Melanie Levesque	3,727	79.4
Democratic	Tom Falter	969	20.6
Total votes		4,696	100
Republican	Kevin Avard (incumbent)	3,274	76.1
Republican	Richard Dowd	1,028	23.9
Total votes		4,302	100
General election
Democratic	Melanie Levesque	12,553	50.3
Republican	Kevin Avard (incumbent)	12,384	49.7
Total votes		24,937	100
Democratic gain from Republican			

==== District 13 ====
Incumbent Democratic state senator Bette Lasky had represented the New Hampshire's 13th State Senate District since 2012. She did not run for reelection in 2018. The open seat was won by Democrat Cindy Rosenwald against Republican David Schoneman.

2018 New Hampshire State Senate election, District 13
Party	Candidate	Votes	%
Democratic	Cindy Rosenwald	11,307	60.9
Republican	David Schoneman	7,259	39.1
Total votes		18,566	100
Democratic hold			

==== District 14 ====
Incumbent Republican state senator Sharon Carson had represented the New Hampshire's 14th State Senate District since 2008. She won reelection against Democrat Tammy Siekmann.

2018 New Hampshire State Senate election, District 14
Party	Candidate	Votes	%
Republican	Sharon Carson (incumbent)	12,823	57.6
Democratic	Tammy Siekmann	9,424	42.4
Total votes		22,247	100
Republican hold			

==== District 15 ====
Incumbent Democratic state senator Dan Feltes had represented the New Hampshire's 15th State Senate District since 2014. He won reelection against Republican Pamela Ean.

2018 New Hampshire State Senate election, District 15
Party	Candidate	Votes	%
Democratic	Dan Feltes (incumbent)	15,929	66.2
Republican	Pamela Ean	8,119	33.8
Total votes		24,048	100
Democratic hold			

==== District 16 ====
Incumbent Democratic state senator Kevin Cavanaugh had represented the New Hampshire's 16th State Senate District since a 2017 special election. He won reelection in a rematch against former Republican state senator David Boutin.

2018 New Hampshire State Senate election, District 16
Primary election
Party	Candidate	Votes	%
Republican	David Boutin	2,961	60.0
Republican	Bill Kuch	1,978	40.0
Total votes		4,939	100
General election
Democratic	Kevin Cavanaugh (incumbent)	12,990	52.3
Republican	David Boutin	11,853	47.7
Total votes		24,843	100
Democratic hold			

==== District 17 ====
Incumbent Republican state senator John Reagan had represented the New Hampshire's 17th State Senate District since 2012. He won reelection against Democrat Christoper Roundy.

2018 New Hampshire State Senate election, District 17
Party	Candidate	Votes	%
Republican	John Reagan (incumbent)	13,172	55.5
Democratic	Christopher Roundy	10,578	44.5
Total votes		23,750	100
Republican hold			

==== District 18 ====
Incumbent Democratic state senator Donna Soucy had represented the New Hampshire's 18th State Senate District since 2012. She won reelection against Republican state representative George Lambert.

2018 New Hampshire State Senate election, District 18
Party	Candidate	Votes	%
Democratic	Donna Soucy (incumbent)	10,276	56.0
Republican	George Lambert	8,066	44.0
Total votes		18,342	100
Democratic hold			

==== District 19 ====
Incumbent Republican state senator Regina Birdsell had represented the New Hampshire's 19th State Senate District since 2014. She won reelection against Democrat Kristina Durocher.

2018 New Hampshire State Senate election, District 19
Party	Candidate	Votes	%
Republican	Regina Birdsell (incumbent)	12,192	56.8
Democratic	Kristina Durocher	9,269	43.2
Total votes		21,461	100
Republican hold			

==== District 20 ====
Incumbent Democratic state senator Lou D'Allesandro had represented the New Hampshire's 20th State Senate District since 1998. D'Allesandro is the longest-serving member of the body. He won reelection against Republican Carla Gericke.

2018 New Hampshire State Senate election, District 20
Party	Candidate	Votes	%
Democratic	Lou D'Allesandro (incumbent)	9,903	58.4
Republican	Carla Gericke	7,047	41.6
Total votes		16,950	100
Democratic hold			

==== District 21 ====
Incumbent Democratic state senator Martha Fuller Clark had represented the New Hampshire's 21st State Senate District since 2012. She won reelection against Republican Peter Macdonald.

2018 New Hampshire State Senate election, District 21
Party	Candidate	Votes	%
Democratic	Martha Fuller Clark (incumbent)	19,084	72.3
Republican	Peter Macdonald	7,324	27.7
Total votes		26,408	100
Democratic hold			

==== District 22 ====
Incumbent Republican state senator Chuck Morse had represented the New Hampshire's 22nd State Senate District since 2010. He won reelection against Democrat Richard O'Shaughnessy and Libertarian Mitch Dyer.

2018 New Hampshire State Senate election, District 22
Party	Candidate	Votes	%
Republican	Chuck Morse (incumbent)	13,571	58.6
Democratic	Richard O'Shaughnessy	9,155	39.5
Libertarian	Mitch Dyer	448	1.9
Total votes		23,174	100
Republican hold			

==== District 23 ====
Incumbent Republican state senator Bill Gannon had represented the New Hampshire's 23rd State Senate District since 2014. He was defeated for reelection by Democrat Jon Morgan.

2018 New Hampshire State Senate election, District 23
Party	Candidate	Votes	%
Democratic	Jon Morgan	12,911	50.2
Republican	Bill Gannon (incumbent)	12,806	49.8
Total votes		25,717	100
Democratic gain from Republican			

==== District 24 ====
Incumbent Republican state senator Daniel Innis had represented the New Hampshire's 24th State Senate District since 2016. He was defeated for reelection by Democratic state representative Tom Sherman.

2018 New Hampshire State Senate election, District 24
Party	Candidate	Votes	%
Democratic	Tom Sherman	15,664	53.1
Republican	Daniel Innis (incumbent)	13,832	46.9
Total votes		29,496	100
Democratic gain from Republican			

== See also ==
- List of New Hampshire General Courts
