= 2020 New Hampshire Senate election =

- November 3, 2020

All 24 seats in the New Hampshire Senate 13 seats needed for a majority

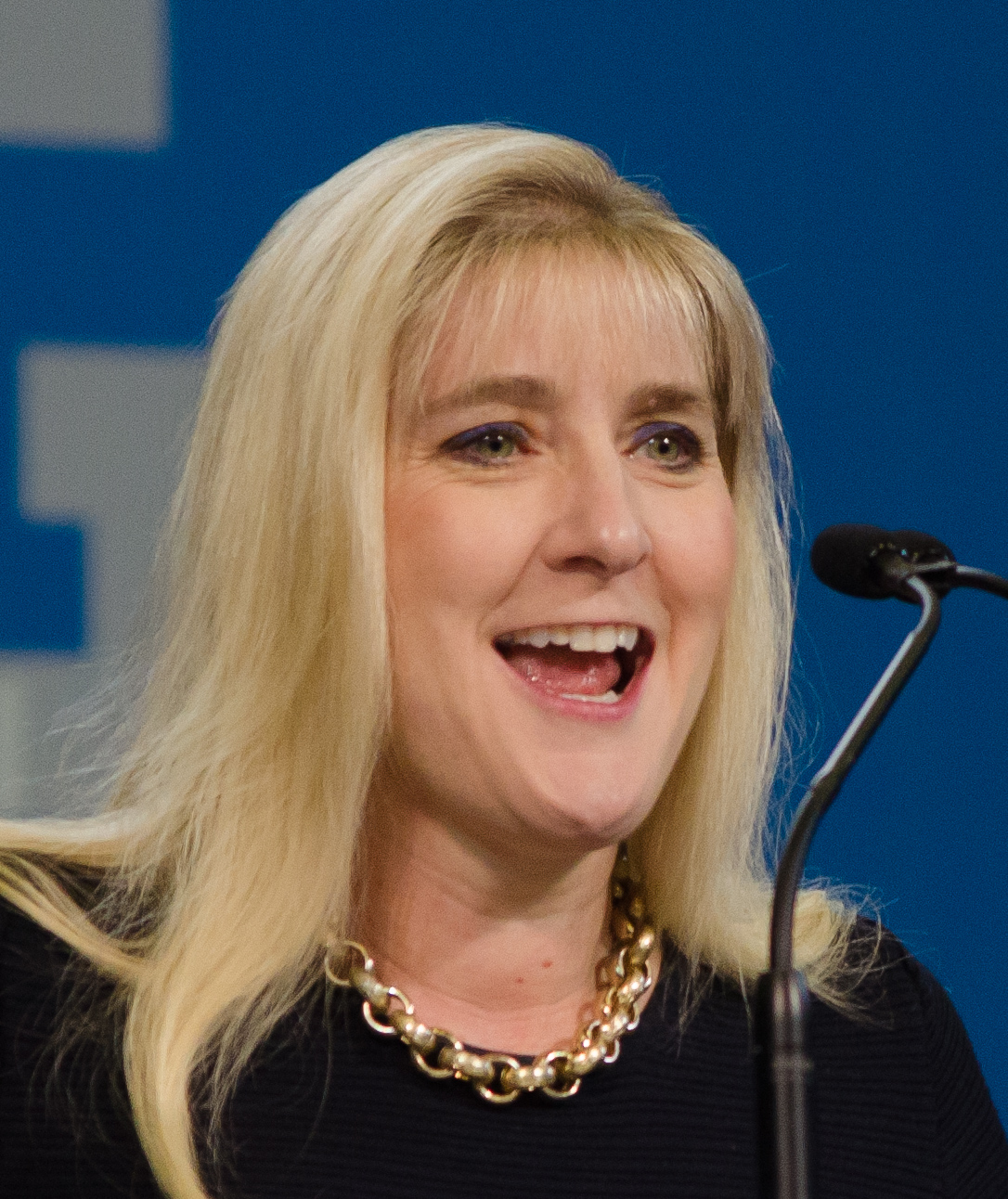
| | Majority party | Minority party |
|---|---|---|
| Leader | Chuck Morse | Donna Soucy |
| Party | Republican | Democratic |
| Leader's seat | 22nd District | 18th District |
| Seats before | 10 | 14 |
| Seats after | 14 | 10 |
| Seat change | ▲4 | ▼4 |
| Popular vote | 384,138 | 381,223 |
| Percentage | 50.2% | 49.8% |
| Swing | ▲4.1% | ▼4.1% |
- Results: Republican gain Republican hold Democratic hold
President before election
Donna Soucy
Democratic
Elected President
Chuck Morse
Republican

The 2020 New Hampshire Senate elections took place as part of the biennial 2020 United States elections. New Hampshire voters elected state senators in all of the state's 24 senate districts. State senators serve two-year terms in the New Hampshire Senate, with all of the seats up for election each cycle. The primary elections on September 8, 2020, determined which candidates will appear on the November 3, 2020, general election ballot.

Following the 2018 election, Democrats had control of the New Hampshire Senate with 14 seats to Republicans' 10 seats. Following the 2020 election, the Republicans flipped four seats and thus control of the chamber alongside flipping the New Hampshire House of Representatives.

== Composition ==
| Affiliation | Party (Shading indicates majority caucus) | | Total | |
| Affiliation | Democratic | Republican | Total | Vacant |
|---|---|---|---|---|
| Before election | 14 | 10 | 24 | 0 |
| After election | 10 | 14 | 24 | 0 |

== Summary ==
| District | Incumbent | Party | Elected Senator | Party |
|---|---|---|---|---|
| 1st | David Starr | Rep | Erin Hennessey | Rep |
| 2nd | Bob Giuda | Rep | Bob Giuda | Rep |
| 3rd | Jeb Bradley | Rep | Jeb Bradley | Rep |
| 4th | David H. Watters | Dem | David H. Watters | Dem |
| 5th | Martha Hennessey (Note: Not seeking reelection, therefore this seat is open.) | Dem | Suzanne Prentiss | Dem |
| 6th | James P. Gray | Rep | James P. Gray | Rep |
| 7th | Harold F. French | Rep | Harold F. French | Rep |
| 8th | Ruth Ward | Rep | Ruth Ward | Rep |
| 9th | Jeanne Dietsch | Dem | Denice Ricciardi | Rep |
| 10th | Jay Kahn | Dem | Jay Kahn | Dem |
| 11th | Shannon Chandley | Dem | Gary Daniels | Rep |
| 12th | Melanie Levesque | Dem | Kevin Avard | Rep |
| 13th | Cindy Rosenwald | Dem | Cindy Rosenwald | Dem |
| 14th | Sharon Carson | Rep | Sharon Carson | Rep |
| 15th | Dan Feltes | Dem | Becky Whitley | Dem |
| 16th | Kevin Cavanaugh | Dem | Kevin Cavanaugh | Dem |
| 17th | John Reagan | Rep | John Reagan | Rep |
| 18th | Donna Soucy | Dem | Donna Soucy | Dem |
| 19th | Regina Birdsell | Rep | Regina Birdsell | Rep |
| 20th | Lou D'Allesandro | Dem | Lou D'Allesandro | Dem |
| 21st | Martha Fuller Clark | Dem | Rebecca Perkins Kwoka | Dem |
| 22nd | Chuck Morse | Rep | Chuck Morse | Rep |
| 23rd | Jon Morgan | Dem | Bill Gannon | Rep |
| 24th | Tom Sherman | Dem | Tom Sherman | Dem |

== Close races ==
| District | Winner | Margin |
|---|---|---|
| District 2 | Republican | 11.66% |
| District 1 | Republican | 14.6% |
| District 6 | Republican | 15.52% |
| District 7 | Republican | 15.94% |
| District 8 | Republican | 11.14% |
| District 9 | Republican (flip) | 1.16% |
| District 11 | Republican (flip) | 0.46% |
| District 12 | Republican (flip) | 2.24% |
| District 13 | Democratic | 17.15% |
| District 14 | Republican | 17.74% |
| District 16 | Democratic | 3.56% |
| District 18 | Democratic | 11.8% |
| District 19 | Republican | 15.08% |
| District 20 | Democratic | 12.78% |
| District 23 | Republican (flip) | 6.72% |
| District 24 | Democratic | 4.7% |

== Outgoing incumbents ==
=== Retiring ===
- Martha Hennessey (D–Hanover), representing District 5 since 2016, announced in May 2020 that she would be retiring at the end of her term to spend more time with her family.
- Martha Fuller Clark (D–Portsmouth), representing District 21 since 2012 (and 2004–2010), announced in May 2020 that she would be retiring from the legislature.

=== Seeking another office ===
- Dan Feltes (D–Concord), representing District 15 since 2014, is not seeking reelection to the Senate in order to run for governor of New Hampshire. Feltes won the primary and faced incumbent Chris Sununu in the general election.

=== Defeated in primary ===
- David Starr (R–Franconia), representing District 1 since 2018, was defeated in the Republican primary by New Hampshire House of Representatives member Erin Hennessey.

== Predictions ==
| Source | Ranking | As of |
|---|---|---|
| The Cook Political Report | Lean D | October 21, 2020 |

== Detailed results ==
=== District 1 ===
==== Candidates ====
Republican

- Erin Hennessey, incumbent state representative for Grafton District 4 since 2014
- David Starr, incumbent state senator since 2018

Democratic

- Susan Ford, incumbent state representative for Grafton District 3 since 2018

==== Results ====
Republican primary

District 1 Republican primary
| Party | Candidate | Votes | % |
|---|---|---|---|
| Republican | Erin Hennessey | 3,379 | 70.3 |
| Republican | David Starr (incumbent) | 1,427 | 29.7 |
| Total votes | | 4,806 | 100.0 |

General election

State Senate District 1 general election, 2020
| Party | Candidate | Votes | % |
|---|---|---|---|
| Republican | Erin Hennessey | 15,756 | 57.3 |
| Democratic | Susan Ford | 11,741 | 42.7 |
| Total votes | | 27,497 | 100.0 |

=== District 2 ===
==== Candidates ====
Republican

- David DeVoy, U.S. Army veteran and gas station owner
- Bob Giuda, incumbent state senator since 2016, former state representative for Grafton District 4 and District 5 2000–2006

Democratic

- Bill Bolton, retired state employee and Plymouth Select Board Chair

==== Results ====
Republican primary

District 2 Republican primary
| Party | Candidate | Votes | % |
|---|---|---|---|
| Republican | Bob Giuda (incumbent) | 5,582 | 80.5 |
| Republican | David DeVoy | 1,352 | 19.5 |
| Total votes | | 6,934 | 100.0 |

General election

State Senate District 2 general election, 2020
| Party | Candidate | Votes | % |
|---|---|---|---|
| Republican | Bob Giuda (incumbent) | 17,661 | 55.83 |
| Democratic | Bill Bolton | 13,974 | 44.17 |
| Total votes | | 31,635 | 100.00 |

=== District 3 ===
==== Candidates ====
Republican

- Jeb Bradley, incumbent state senator since 2009, former Majority Leader (2010–2018), former U.S. Representative from New Hampshire's 1st congressional district (2003–2007)

Democratic

- Theresa Swanick, Effingham elected official and candidate for state representative in Carroll District 5 in 2016 and 2018

==== Results ====
State Senate District 3 general election, 2020
| Party | Candidate | Votes | % |
|---|---|---|---|
| Republican | Jeb Bradley (incumbent) | 22,086 | 61.5 |
| Democratic | Theresa Swanick | 13,826 | 38.5 |
| Total votes | | 35,912 | 100.0 |

=== District 4 ===
==== Candidates ====
Democratic

- David H. Watters, incumbent state senator since 2012

Republican

- Frank Bertone, former Libertarian candidate for state representative Strafford District 4 in 2018

==== Results ====
State Senate District 4 general election, 2020
| Party | Candidate | Votes | % |
|---|---|---|---|
| Democratic | David H. Watters (incumbent) | 19,228 | 61.36 |
| Republican | Frank Bertone | 12,107 | 38.64 |
| Total votes | | 31,335 | 100.00 |

=== District 5 ===
==== Candidates ====
Democratic

- Beatriz Pastor, former state representative for Grafton District 12 (2008–2014)
- Suzanne Prentiss, former Lebanon Mayor, current Lebanon councilwoman and paramedic

Republican

- Timothy O'Hearne

==== Results ====
Democratic primary

District 5 Democratic primary
| Party | Candidate | Votes | % |
|---|---|---|---|
| Democratic | Suzanne Prentiss | 4,124 | 50.4 |
| Democratic | Beatriz Pastor | 4,056 | 49.6 |
| Total votes | | 8,180 | 100.0 |

General election

State Senate District 5 general election, 2020
| Party | Candidate | Votes | % |
|---|---|---|---|
| Democratic | Suzanne Prentiss | 20,418 | 66.46 |
| Republican | Timothy O'Hearne | 10,295 | 33.54 |
| Total votes | | 30,713 | 100.00 |

=== District 6 ===
==== Candidates ====
Republican

- James Gray, incumbent state senator since 2016

Democratic

- Christopher Rice, Rochester councilman

==== Results ====
State Senate District 6 general election, 2020
| Party | Candidate | Votes | % |
|---|---|---|---|
| Republican | James Gray (incumbent) | 17,290 | 57.77 |
| Democratic | Christopher Rice | 12,638 | 42.23 |
| Total votes | | 29,928 | 100.00 |

=== District 7 ===
==== Candidates ====
Republican

- Harold F. French, incumbent state senator since 2016

Democratic

- Philip Spagnuolo Jr., former state representative for Belknap District 3 (February–December 2018)

==== Results ====
State Senate District 7 general election, 2020
| Party | Candidate | Votes | % |
|---|---|---|---|
| Republican | Harold F. French (incumbent) | 17,801 | 57.97 |
| Democratic | Philip Spagnuolo Jr. | 12,907 | 42.03 |
| Total votes | | 30,708 | 100.00 |

=== District 8 ===
==== Candidates ====
Republican

- Ruth Ward, incumbent state senator since 2016

Democratic

- Jenn Alford-Teaster, researcher and candidate for District 8 in 2018

==== Results ====
State Senate District 8 general election, 2020
| Party | Candidate | Votes | % |
|---|---|---|---|
| Republican | Ruth Ward (incumbent) | 18,903 | 55.57 |
| Democratic | Jenn Alford-Teaster | 15,114 | 44.43 |
| Total votes | | 34,017 | 100.00 |

=== District 9 ===
==== Candidates ====
Democratic

- Jeanne Dietsch, incumbent state senator since 2018

Republican

- Denise Ricciardi, Bedford councilwoman

==== Results ====
State Senate District 9 general election, 2020
| Party | Candidate | Votes | % |
|---|---|---|---|
| Republican | Denise Ricciardi | 17,920 | 50.58 |
| Democratic | Jeanne Dietsch (incumbent) | 17,511 | 49.42 |
| Total votes | | 35,431 | 100.00 |

=== District 10 ===
==== Candidates ====
Democratic

- Jay Kahn, incumbent state senator since 2016

Republican

- Dan LeClair, businessman and candidate for District 10 in 2018.

==== Results ====
State Senate District 10 general election, 2020
| Party | Candidate | Votes | % |
|---|---|---|---|
| Democratic | Jay Kahn (incumbent) | 18,876 | 62.55 |
| Republican | Dan LeClair | 11,303 | 37.45 |
| Total votes | | 30,179 | 100.00 |

=== District 11 ===
==== Candidates ====
Democratic

- Shannon Chandley, incumbent state senator since 2018

Republican

- Gary Daniels, former state senator from District 11 (2014–2018)

==== Results ====
State Senate District 11 general election, 2020
| Party | Candidate | Votes | % |
|---|---|---|---|
| Republican | Gary Daniels | 17 493 | 50.23 |
| Democratic | Shannon Chandley (incumbent) | 17 334 | 49.77 |
| Total votes | | 34,827 | 100.00 |

=== District 12 ===
==== Candidates ====
Democratic

- Melanie Levesque, incumbent state senator since 2018

Republican

- Kevin Avard, former state senator from District 12 (2014–2018)

==== Results ====
State Senate District 12 general election, 2020
| Party | Candidate | Votes | % |
|---|---|---|---|
| Republican | Kevin Avard | 17,534 | 51.17 |
| Democratic | Melanie Levesque (incumbent) | 16,729 | 48.83 |
| Total votes | | 34,263 | 100.00 |

=== District 13 ===
==== Candidates ====
Democratic

- Cindy Rosenwald, incumbent state senator since 2018

Republican

- Mariellen MacKay, former Democratic state representative for Hillsborough District 30 (2012–2018), Republican candidate for Hillsborough District 30 in 2018

==== Results ====
State Senate District 13 general election, 2020
| Party | Candidate | Votes | % |
|---|---|---|---|
| Democratic | Cindy Rosenwald (incumbent) | 15,611 | 58.57 |
| Republican | Mariellen MacKay | 11,042 | 41.42 |
| Total votes | | 26,653 | 100.00 |

=== District 14 ===
==== Candidates ====
Republican

- Sharon Carson, incumbent state senator since 2008, former president pro tempore of the New Hampshire Senate (2014–2018)

Democratic

- Nancy Hendricks, former Londonderry School Board chair

==== Results ====
State Senate District 14 general election, 2020
| Party | Candidate | Votes | % |
|---|---|---|---|
| Republican | Sharon Carson (incumbent) | 19,082 | 58.87 |
| Democratic | Nancy Hendricks | 13 330 | 41.13 |
| Total votes | | 32 412 | 100.00 |

=== District 15 ===
==== Candidates ====
Democratic

- Candace Bouchard, former Concord councilwoman and former state representative for Merrimack District 18 (1998–2014)
- Paul Hodes, former U.S. representative for New Hampshire's 2nd congressional district (2007–2011)
- Becky Whitley, lawyer and activist

Republican

- Linda Rae Banfill, candidate for Concord mayor in 2019

==== Results ====
Democratic primary

District 15 Democratic primary
| Party | Candidate | Votes | % |
|---|---|---|---|
| Democratic | Becky Whitley | 3,845 | 40.9 |
| Democratic | Paul Hodes | 3,124 | 33.3 |
| Democratic | Candace Bouchard | 2,418 | 25.8 |
| Total votes | | 9,387 | 100.0 |

General election

State Senate District 15 general election, 2020
| Party | Candidate | Votes | % |
|---|---|---|---|
| Democratic | Becky Whitley | 19 462 | 63.38 |
| Republican | Linda Rae Banfill | 11 243 | 36.62 |
| Total votes | | 30,705 | 100.00 |

=== District 16 ===
==== Candidates ====
Democratic

- Kevin Cavanaugh, incumbent state senator since 2017

Republican

- Jason Syversen, businessman

==== Results ====
State Senate District 16 general election, 2020
| Party | Candidate | Votes | % |
|---|---|---|---|
| Democratic | Kevin Cavanaugh (incumbent) | 17,165 | 51.78 |
| Republican | Jason Syversen | 15,986 | 48.22 |
| Total votes | | 33,151 | 100.00 |

=== District 17 ===
==== Candidates ====
Republican

- Janet DelFuoco, witch
- John Reagan, incumbent state senator since 2012

Democratic

- Nancy Fraher, state senate candidate for District 17 in 2014 and 2016

==== Results ====
Republican primary

District 17 Republican primary
| Party | Candidate | Votes | % |
|---|---|---|---|
| Republican | John Reagan (incumbent) | 5,688 | 82.6 |
| Republican | Janet DelFuoco | 1,201 | 17.4 |
| Total votes | | 6,889 | 100.0 |

General election

State Senate District 17 general election, 2020
| Party | Candidate | Votes | % |
|---|---|---|---|
| Republican | John Reagan (incumbent) | 20,317 | 60.1 |
| Democratic | Nancy Fraher | 13,488 | 39.9 |
| Total votes | | 33,805 | 100.0 |

=== District 18 ===
==== Candidates ====
Democratic

- Donna Soucy, incumbent state senator since 2012, incumbent Senate President since December 2018

Republican

- George Lambert, former state representative for Hillsborough District 44 (2010–2014), former candidate for Governor (2014), candidate for District 18 in 2018
- Ross Terrio, former Manchester School Board member (2013–2020), former state representative for Hillsborough District 14 (2010–2012)

==== Results ====
Republican primary

District 18 Republican primary
| Party | Candidate | Votes | % |
|---|---|---|---|
| Republican | George Lambert | 2,317 | 57.9 |
| Republican | Ross Terrio | 1,681 | 42.1 |
| Total votes | | 3,998 | 100.0 |

General election

State Senate District 18 general election, 2020
| Party | Candidate | Votes | % |
|---|---|---|---|
| Democratic | Donna Soucy (incumbent) | 14,105 | 55.4 |
| Republican | George Lambert | 11,355 | 44.6 |
| Total votes | | 25,460 | 100.0 |

=== District 19 ===
==== Candidates ====
Republican

- Regina Birdsell, incumbent state senator since 2014

Democratic

- Joshua Bourdon, Derry councilman

==== Results ====
State Senate District 19 general election, 2020
| Party | Candidate | Votes | % |
|---|---|---|---|
| Republican | Regina Birdsell (incumbent) | 18,263 | 57.54 |
| Democratic | Joshua Bourdon | 13,477 | 42.46 |
| Total votes | | 31,740 | 100 |

=== District 20 ===
==== Candidates ====
Democratic

- Lou D'Allesandro, incumbent state senator since 1998

Republican

- Carla Gericke, candidate for District 20 in 2016 and 2018
- Jack Kenny

==== Results ====
Republican primary

District 20 Republican primary
| Party | Candidate | Votes | % |
|---|---|---|---|
| Republican | Carla Gericke | 1,608 | 50.7 |
| Republican | Jack Kenny | 1,564 | 49.3 |
| Total votes | | 3,172 | 100.0 |

General election

State Senate District 20 general election, 2020
| Party | Candidate | Votes | % |
|---|---|---|---|
| Democratic | Lou D'Allesandro (incumbent) | 13,548 | 56.39 |
| Republican | Carla Gericke | 10,479 | 43.61 |
| Total votes | | 24,027 | 100.00 |

=== District 21 ===
==== Candidates ====
Democratic

- Deaglan McEachern, Portsmouth councilman
- Rebecca Perkins Kwoka, Portsmouth councilwoman

Republican

- Sue Polidura, historian

==== Results ====
Democratic primary

District 21 Democratic primary
| Party | Candidate | Votes | % |
|---|---|---|---|
| Democratic | Rebecca Perkins Kwoka | 6,181 | 62.9 |
| Democratic | Deaglan McEachern | 3,639 | 37.1 |
| Total votes | | 9,820 | 100.0 |

General election

State Senate District 21 general election, 2020
| Party | Candidate | Votes | % |
|---|---|---|---|
| Democratic | Rebecca Perkins Kwoka | 21,827 | 67.07 |
| Republican | Sue Polidura | 10,717 | 32.93 |
| Total votes | | 32,544 | 100.00 |

=== District 22 ===
==== Candidates ====
Republican

- Chuck Morse, incumbent state senator since 2010 (and also 2002–2006) and former Senate President (2013–2018); Minority leader since 2018

Democratic

- Thomas Haynes, retired

==== Results ====
State Senate District 22 general election, 2020
| Party | Candidate | Votes | % |
|---|---|---|---|
| Republican | Chuck Morse (incumbent) | 22,191 | 64.76 |
| Democratic | Thomas Haynes | 12,073 | 35.24 |
| Total votes | | 34,264 | 100.00 |

=== District 23 ===
==== Candidates ====
Democratic

- Jon Morgan, incumbent state senator since 2018

Republican

- Allen Cook, former state representative for Rockingham District 11 (2014–2018)
- Bill Gannon, former state senator for District 23 (2016–2018)

==== Results ====
Republican primary

District 23 Republican primary
| Party | Candidate | Votes | % |
|---|---|---|---|
| Republican | Bill Gannon | 5,000 | 73.3 |
| Republican | Allen Cook | 1,564 | 26.7 |
| Total votes | | 6,820 | 100.0 |

General election

State Senate District 23 general election, 2020
| Party | Candidate | Votes | % |
|---|---|---|---|
| Republican | Bill Gannon | 18,627 | 53.31 |
| Democratic | Jon Morgan (incumbent) | 16,314 | 46.69 |
| Total votes | | 34,941 | 100.00 |

=== District 24 ===
==== Candidates ====
Democratic

- Tom Sherman, incumbent state senator since 2018

Republican

- Regina Barnes, Hampton Board of Selectmen member
- Louis Gargiulo, 2016 Republican National Convention delegate from New Hampshire

==== Results ====
Republican primary

District 24 Republican primary
| Party | Candidate | Votes | % |
|---|---|---|---|
| Republican | Louis Gargiulo | 5,257 | 71.6 |
| Republican | Regina Barnes | 2,084 | 28.4 |
| Total votes | | 7,341 | 100.0 |

General election

State Senate District 24 general election, 2020
| Party | Candidate | Votes | % |
|---|---|---|---|
| Democratic | Tom Sherman (incumbent) | 20,527 | 52.35 |
| Republican | Louis Gargiulo | 18,687 | 47.65 |
| Total votes | | 39,214 | 100.00 |

== See also ==
- 2020 New Hampshire elections
- 2020 United States elections
- New Hampshire Senate
- Elections in New Hampshire
- List of New Hampshire General Courts
