= Dian McCarthy =

American politician

Member-elect of the New Hampshire Senate from the 16th district
- Assuming office December 2, 2026
- Succeeding: Keith Murphy

Personal details
- Party: Democratic

Dian McCarthy is an American politician. A member of the Democratic Party, she is the member-elect for the 16th District of the New Hampshire Senate. McCarthy previously served as the chair of the Goffstown School Board.

== See also ==
- 2026 New Hampshire Senate election
