= Carryl Roy =

American politician

Member-elect of the New Hampshire Senate from the 12th district
- Assuming office December 2026
- Succeeding: Kevin Avard

Personal details
- Party: Democratic

Carryl Roy is an American politician. A member of the Democratic Party, she is the member-elect for the 12th district of the New Hampshire Senate.
