= Peter Bragdon =

American politician

President of the New Hampshire Senate
- In office December 1, 2010 – August 27, 2013
- Preceded by: Sylvia Larsen
- Succeeded by: Chuck Morse

Member of the New Hampshire Senate from the 11th district
- In office December 1, 2004 – December 5, 2014
- Preceded by: Andrew Peterson
- Succeeded by: Gary Daniels

Member of the New Hampshire House of Representatives from the Hillsborough 6th district
- In office December 6, 2000 – December 4, 2002

Member of the Milford School Board
- In office December 2, 1998 – December 6, 2000

Personal details
- Born: Amherst, New Hampshire
- Party: Republican
- Education: University of Massachusetts Lowell (BS)
- Profession: Newspaper publisher
- Website: www.peterbragdon.com

Peter Bragdon is a Republican former member of the New Hampshire Senate, representing the 11th District from 2004 through 2014. Previously he was a member of the New Hampshire House of Representatives from 2000 until 2002. Bragdon was President of the New Hampshire State Senate from December 1, 2010, through August 27, 2013.

== Education ==
Bragdon holds a bachelor's degree in math and computer science from the University of Massachusetts Lowell.

== Career ==
=== Political career ===
Bragdon stepped down as president of the New Hampshire Senate on August 27, 2013, and was succeeded by Chuck Morse.

== Additional affiliations ==
Bragdon was owner and publisher of The Milford Observer.
