= Leonard Bell =

American politician

Member-elect of the New Hampshire Senate from the 18th district
- Assuming office December 2, 2026
- Succeeding: Victoria Sullivan

Personal details
- Party: Democratic

Leonard Bell is an American politician. A member of the Democratic Party, he is the member-elect for the 18th District of the New Hampshire Senate. Bell is an adjunct faculty instructor at Southern New Hampshire University, and served in the United States Navy.

== See also ==
- 2026 New Hampshire Senate election
