= Beatriz Pastor =

American politician

Member of New Hampshire House of Representatives for Grafton 12
- In office 2008–2014

Personal details
- Party: Democratic
- Education: Southern New Hampshire University

Beatriz Pastor is an American politician. She represented Grafton 12th district at the New Hampshire House of Representatives from 2008 to 2014.

Pastor is a professor of Spanish and comparative literature at Dartmouth College. In the 2020 New Hampshire Senate election, she was a candidate for District 5.
