= Kurt Webber =

American politician

Member-elect of the New Hampshire Senate from the 2nd district
- Assuming office December 2026
- Succeeding: Timothy P. Lang

Personal details
- Party: Democratic

Kurt Webber is an American politician. A member of the Democratic Party, he is the member-elect for the 2nd district of the New Hampshire Senate.

Webber graduated from West Point in 1979 and served in the U.S. Army and taught at a community college. He has been a Scout leader and a coach.

Webber campaigned for the New Hampshire House in 2022 and 2024.
