= Mariellen MacKay =

American politician

Member of New Hampshire House of Representatives for Hillsborough 30
- In office December 5, 2012 – 2018

Personal details
- Party: Republican

Mariellen J. MacKay is an American politician. She was a member of the New Hampshire House of Representatives and represented Hillsborough's 30th district.

In April 2017, MacKay switched from Democrat to Republican. She was a candidate in the 2020 New Hampshire Senate election in District 13.
