= New Hampshire's 11th State Senate district =

American legislative district

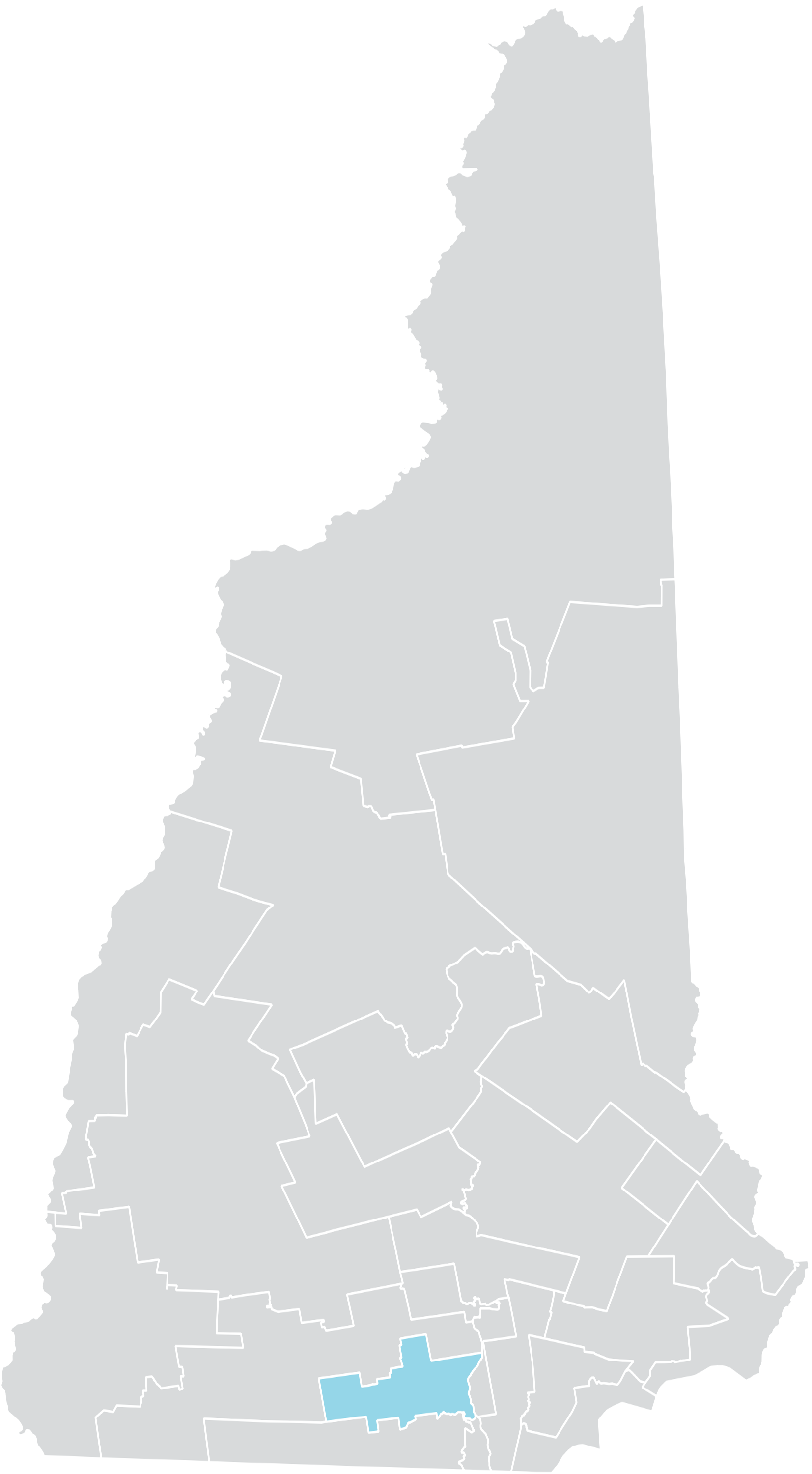
Senator
Tim McGough; R–Merrimack
- Registration: 32.4% Republican; 29.4% Democratic; 38.0% No party preference
- Demographics: 91.8% White; 1.0% Black; 3.0% Hispanic; 2.2% Asian
- Population (2018) • Citizens of voting age: 56,803; 42,940
- Notes: Median income: $101,489

New Hampshire's 11th State Senate district is one of 24 districts in the New Hampshire Senate. It has been represented by Republican Tim McGough since 2024.

== Geography ==
District 11 covers much of central Hillsborough County between the cities of Manchester and Nashua, including the towns of Amherst, Merrimack, Milford, and Wilton.

The district is split between New Hampshire's 1st congressional district and New Hampshire's 2nd congressional district.

== Recent election results ==
=== 2024 ===
2024 New Hampshire State Senate election, District 11
Party	Candidate	Votes	%
Republican	Tim McGough	18,440	50.90
Democratic	Shannon Chandley (Incumbent)	17,767	49.05
Write-in		17	0.05
Total votes		36,224	100.0
Republican gain from Democratic			

=== 2022 ===
2022 New Hampshire State Senate election, District 11
Party	Candidate	Votes	%
Democratic	Shannon Chandley	14,320	51.3
Republican	Gary Daniels (incumbent)	13,591	48.7
Total votes		27,911	100
Democratic gain from Republican			

Elections prior to 2022 were held under different district lines.

== Historical election results ==
=== 2020 ===
2020 New Hampshire State Senate election, District 11
Party	Candidate	Votes	%
Republican	Gary Daniels	17,493	50.2
Democratic	Shannon Chandley (incumbent)	17,334	49.8
Total votes		34,827	100
Republican gain from Democratic			

=== 2018 ===
2018 New Hampshire State Senate election, District 11
Primary election
Party	Candidate	Votes	%
Democratic	Shannon Chandley	3,917	83.1
Democratic	Roger Tilton	797	16.9
Total votes		4,714	100
General election
Democratic	Shannon Chandley	13,361	52.3
Republican	Gary Daniels (incumbent)	12,205	47.7
Total votes		25,566	100
Democratic gain from Republican			

=== 2016 ===
2016 New Hampshire State Senate election, District 11
Party	Candidate	Votes	%
Republican	Gary Daniels (incumbent)	17,235	56.6
Democratic	Roger Tilton	13,227	43.4
Total votes		30,462	100
Republican hold			

=== 2014 ===
2014 New Hampshire State Senate election, District 11
Primary election
Party	Candidate	Votes	%
Republican	Gary Daniels	2,126	38.8
Republican	Maureen Mooney	1,682	30.7
Republican	Dan Hynes	888	16.2
Republican	Daniel Dwyer	781	14.3
Total votes		5,477	100
General election
Republican	Gary Daniels	12,754	59.8
Democratic	Roger Tilton	8,575	40.2
Total votes		21,329	100
Republican hold			

=== 2012 ===
2012 New Hampshire State Senate election, District 11
Primary election
Party	Candidate	Votes	%
Republican	Peter Bragdon (incumbent)	2,965	61.5
Republican	Daniel Dwyer	1,854	38.5
Total votes		4,819	100
General election
Republican	Peter Bragdon (incumbent)	18,644	100
Total votes		18,644	100
Republican hold			

=== Federal and statewide results ===
Year	Office	Results
2020	President	Biden 53.8 – 44.4%
2020	Senate	Shaheen 57.1 – 40.4%
2016	President	Trump 48.1 – 46.4%
2016	Senate	Ayotte 51.3 - 44.8%
2014	Senate	Brown 53.0 – 47.0%
2014	Governor	Havenstein 53.6 – 46.4%
2012	President	Romney 50.9 – 47.7%
2012	Governor	Hassan 51.0 – 46.4%
