= Melanie Levesque =

American politician (born 1957)

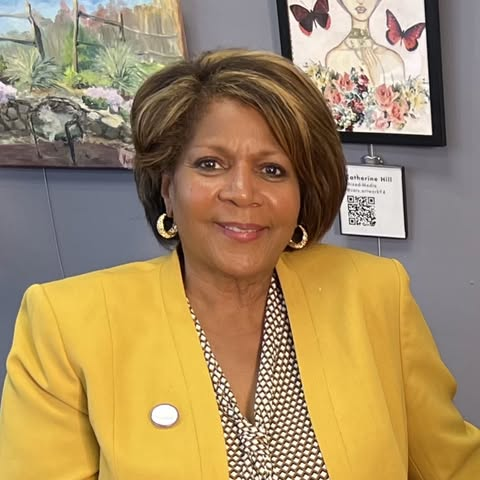
- Levesque in 2022

Member-elect of the New Hampshire Executive Council from the 5th district
- Assuming office January 2027
- Succeeding: Dave Wheeler

Member of the New Hampshire Senate from the 12th district
- In office December 5, 2018 – December 2, 2020
- Preceded by: Kevin Avard
- Succeeded by: Kevin Avard

Member of the New Hampshire House of Representatives from the Hillsborough 26th district
- In office December 2012 – December 2014
- Preceded by: Multi-member district
- Succeeded by: Multi-member district

Member of the New Hampshire House of Representatives from the Hillsborough 5th district
- In office December 2006 – December 2010
- Preceded by: Multi-member district
- Succeeded by: Multi-member district

Personal details
- Born: Melanie Ann Levesque; May 20, 1957 (age 69) Boston, Massachusetts, U.S.
- Party: Democratic
- Education: Nashua Community College (AA); Daniel Webster College (BS); Southern New Hampshire University (MBA)
- Website: Campaign website

Melanie Ann Levesque (/ləˈveɪk/ lə-VAYK; born May 20, 1957) is an American politician from the state of New Hampshire who is the member-elect of the New Hampshire Executive Council from the 5th district. Levesque represented the 12th district in the New Hampshire Senate from 2018 until 2020; she was the first African American to serve in that body. Levesque was chair of the Senate Election Law & Municipal Affairs committee, and served on the Judiciary and Transportation committees. Levesque previously served in the New Hampshire House of Representatives from 2006 to 2010 and 2012 to 2014. In 2021, Levesque was a senior advisor for the New Hampshire Democratic Party. In 2022, Levesque announced her run for the New Hampshire Secretary of State. She was the Democratic candidate for Executive Council in the 5th district in 2026 defeating incumbent Republican Dave Wheeler.

== Education and career ==
Levesque was born in the Boston neighborhood of Roxbury. She earned an A.A. from Nashua Community College, a B.S. from Daniel Webster College, and an M.B.A. from Southern New Hampshire University. She is the president of TCS of America Enterprises LLC, a telecommunications service provider based in Brookline.

Levesque was awarded the 2026 Martin Luther King, Jr. Award by the New Hampshire Martin Luther King, Jr. Coalition, for carrying on the late civil rights activist's work for social justice.

== New Hampshire House of Representatives ==
Levesque was elected to the New Hampshire House of Representatives in 2006 for Hillsborough's 5th district, a four-member district. She served two terms before being defeated for re-election in 2010. Levesque was Assistant Majority Floor Leader between 2008 and 2010.

She served on both the House Election Law and the Science Technology and Energy committees, where she earned a reputation for working across political lines in order to enact legislation that improved the lives of the families she represented. In 2009 Levesque Sponsored and passed a bill to create a Statewide Emergency Notification System for NH.

In 2012, Levesque successfully ran for Hillsborough's 26th district, serving once again as Assistant Majority Floor Leader before being defeated for a second term in 2014. She ran and lost once again for the same district in 2016.

== New Hampshire Senate ==
In 2018, Levesque announced she would run for the 12th district in the New Hampshire Senate against Republican incumbent Kevin Avard. After defeating Tom Falter in the primary election, Levesque defeated Avard in the general election 50.3% to 49.7%, a margin of 169 votes. Levesque's victory was one of five seats Democrats flipped to regain the majority in the Senate.

Levesque was the Senate's first African American member. She was chair of the Election Law and Municipal Affairs Committee, and a member of the Judiciary Committee and the Transportation Committee.

In 2020, Levesque was defeated by Kevin Avard in a rematch of their 2018 contest. Levesque was defeated again by Kevin Avard in 2022.

== Personal life ==
Levesque lives in Brookline, New Hampshire with her husband Scott, with whom she has one child.
