= Tim McGough =

American politician

Member of the New Hampshire Senate from the 11th district
- Incumbent
- Assumed office December 4, 2024
- Preceded by: Shannon Chandley

Member of the New Hampshire House of Representatives from the Hillsborough 12th district
- In office December 7, 2022 – December 4, 2024

Member of the New Hampshire House of Representatives from the Hillsborough 18th district
- In office December 4, 1996 – December 6, 2000

Personal details
- Party: Republican

Tim McGough is an American politician and business executive. In 2024, McGough was elected to represent the 11th district in the New Hampshire Senate, after defeating incumbent Shannon Chandley. Previously, McGough represented the Hillsborough 12th and 18th district in the New Hampshire House of Representatives from 1996 to 2000 and again from 2022 to 2024.

During his tenure in the Senate, McGough was assigned to the Commerce and the Executive Department and Administration committees, where he serves as the Vice Chairman. McGough also served as the chairman of the New Hampshire Canadian Trade Council.

McGough opposed efforts to build an ICE facility in Merrimack, New Hampshire. He was the sponsor for a bill which would define an unsafe motor vehicle, following the repeal of mandatory state inspections. McGough supported removal of the state inspections.

McGough sponsored legislation which aimed to reduce Crypto ATM scams on elderly by imposing a right to refund and transaction limits. In April 2026, he was temporarily removed from his assigned Senate committees and Senate Republican Caucus amid allegations of harassment of Senate staff. On April 4, 2026, the Amherst Republican Town Committee voted unanimously in support of McGough, expressing their “full confidence” in him.

In the 2026 election, McGough was defeated for re-election.
