= Terry Wolf =

American politician

Member of New Hampshire House of Representatives for Hillsborough 7
- In office 2014–2018
- Succeeded by: Michael Trento

Personal details
- Party: Republican

Terry Wolf is an American politician who was a member of the New Hampshire House of Representatives and represented Hillsborough 7th district. Wolf was a school board member and board chair in Bedford, New Hampshire. Wolf was a District 9 candidate in the 2018 New Hampshire Senate election but was defeated in the primary.
