= Rebecca Harned =

American politician

Member-elect of the New Hampshire Senate from the 7th district
- Assuming office December 2026
- Succeeding: Dan Innis

Personal details
- Party: Democratic

Rebecca Harned is an American politician. A member of the Democratic Party, she is the member-elect for the 7th district of the New Hampshire Senate.
