= New Hampshire's 12th State Senate district =

American legislative district

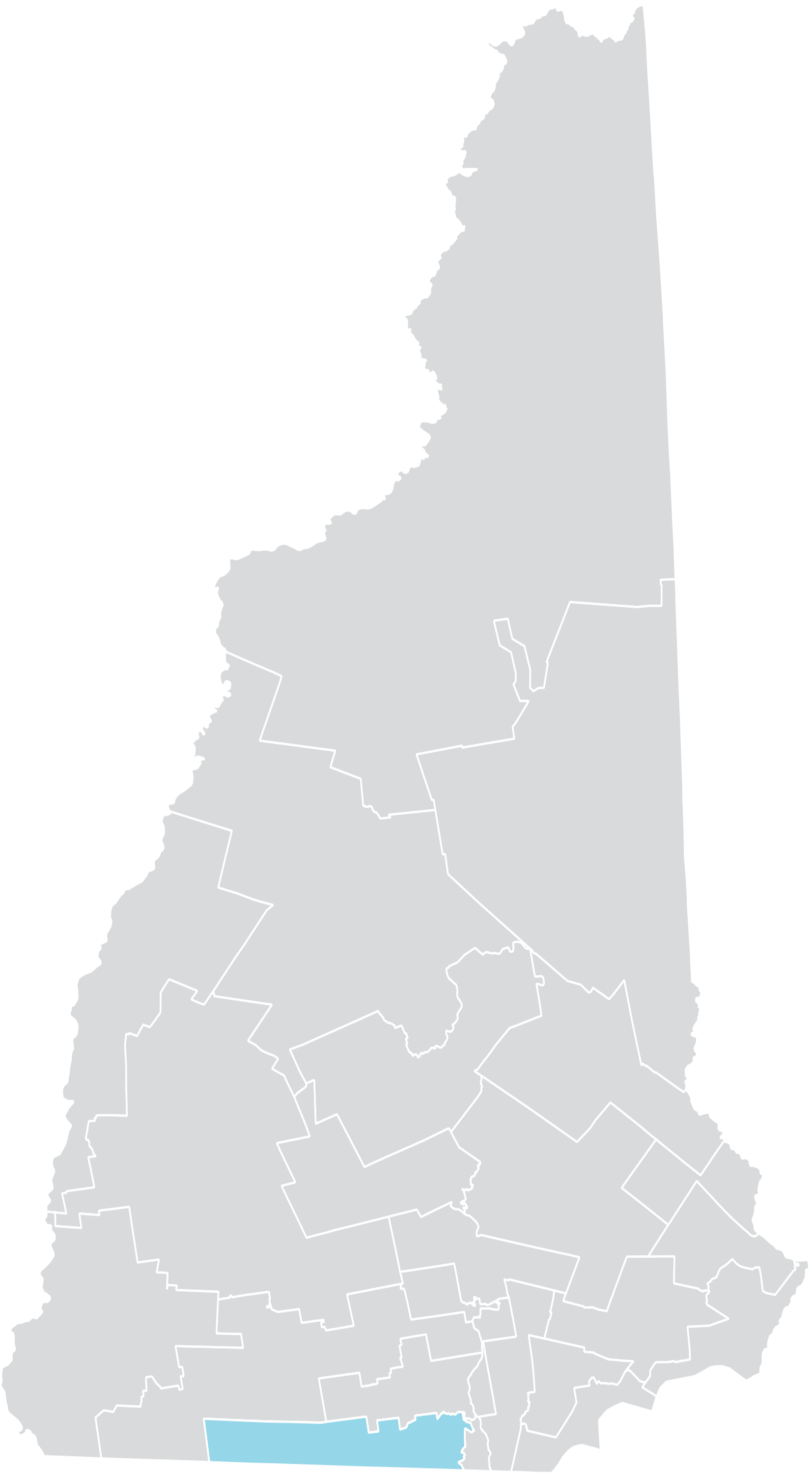
Senator
Kevin Avard; R–Nashua
- Registration: 31.7% Republican; 24.7% Democratic; 43.5% No party preference
- Demographics: 86.7% White; 2.5% Black; 4.6% Hispanic; 6.1% Asian
- Population (2019) • Citizens of voting age: 57,145; 43,983

New Hampshire's 12th State Senate district is one of 24 districts in the New Hampshire Senate. It has been represented by Republican Kevin Avard since 2020, following his victory over incumbent Democrat Melanie Levesque.

== Geography ==
District 12 covers Nashua's 1st, 2nd, and 5th wards, as well as several towns to its west, including Brookline, Greenville, Hollis, Mason, New Ipswich, and Rindge. It is mostly within Hillsborough County, with a small portion extending into Cheshire County.

The district is entirely located within New Hampshire's 2nd congressional district. It borders the state of Massachusetts.

== Recent election results ==
=== 2024 ===
2024 New Hampshire State Senate election, District 12
Party	Candidate	Votes	%
Republican	Kevin Avard (Incumbent)	19,841	55.88
Democratic	Ben Ming	15,643	44.06
Write-in		21	0.06
Total votes		35,505	100.0
Republican hold			

=== 2022 ===
2022 New Hampshire State Senate election, District 12
Party	Candidate	Votes	%
Republican	Kevin Avard (incumbent)	14,314	51.2
Democratic	Melanie Levesque	13,626	48.8
Total votes		27,943	100.0

=== 2020 ===
2020 New Hampshire State Senate election, District 12
Party	Candidate	Votes	%
Republican	Kevin Avard	17,534	51.2
Democratic	Melanie Levesque (incumbent)	16,729	48.8
Total votes		34,263	100
Republican gain from Democratic			

=== 2018 ===
2018 New Hampshire State Senate election, District 12
Primary election
Party	Candidate	Votes	%
Democratic	Melanie Levesque	3,727	79.4
Democratic	Tom Falter	969	20.6
Total votes		4,696	100
Republican	Kevin Avard (incumbent)	3,274	76.1
Republican	Richard Dowd	1,028	23.9
Total votes		4,302	100
General election
Democratic	Melanie Levesque	12,553	50.3
Republican	Kevin Avard (incumbent)	12,384	49.7
Total votes		24,937	100
Democratic gain from Republican			

=== 2016 ===
2016 New Hampshire State Senate election, District 12
Party	Candidate	Votes	%
Republican	Kevin Avard (incumbent)	15,942	51.3
Democratic	Peggy Gilmour	15,120	48.7
Total votes		31,062	100
Republican hold			

=== 2014 ===
2014 New Hampshire State Senate election, District 12
Primary election
Party	Candidate	Votes	%
Republican	Kevin Avard	2,651	53.7
Republican	Michael McCarthy	2,284	46.3
Total votes		4,935	100
General election
Republican	Kevin Avard	10,839	50.8
Democratic	Peggy Gilmour (incumbent)	10,517	49.2
Total votes		21,356	100
Republican gain from Democratic			

=== 2012 ===
2012 New Hampshire State Senate election, District 12
Party	Candidate	Votes	%
Democratic	Peggy Gilmour	15,245	51.9
Republican	Jim Luther (incumbent)	14,101	48.1
Total votes		29,346	100
Democratic gain from Republican			

=== Federal and statewide results ===
Year	Office	Results
2020	President	Biden 51.6% – 46.8%
2020	Senate	Shaheen 54.3% – 43.2%
2016	President	Trump 48.5 – 46.0%
2014	Senate	Brown 54.3 – 45.7%
2014	Governor	Havenstein 54.1 – 45.9%
2012	President	Romney 51.4 – 47.2%
2012	Governor	Hassan 50.8 – 46.3%
