= Symm v. United States =

- Supreme Court of the United States

Decided January 15, 1979
- Full case name: LeRoy Symm, Tax Assessor-Collector of Waller County, Texas v. United States, et al.
- Citations: 439 U.S. 1105 (more) 99 S. Ct. 1006; 59 L. Ed. 2d 66; 1979 U.S. LEXIS 449

Case history
- Prior: United States v. Texas, 445 F. Supp. 1245 (S.D. Tex. 1978)
- Subsequent: Rehearing denied, 440 U.S. 951 (1979).

Court membership
- Chief Justice Warren E. Burger Associate Justices William J. Brennan Jr. · Potter Stewart; Byron White · Thurgood Marshall; Harry Blackmun · Lewis F. Powell Jr. William Rehnquist · John P. Stevens

Case opinions
- Per curiam
- Dissent: Rehnquist, joined by Burger

Symm v. United States, 439 U.S. 1105 (1979), was a United States Supreme Court case in which the Court summarily affirmed United States v. Texas, holding unconstitutional the denial to Prairie View students of the presumption of bona fide residency extended to other Waller County students.

== Background ==
Waller County, a small rural county west of Houston, had a population of approximately 15,000, a slight majority of which was black. Prairie View A&M University is a state-supported, predominantly black university located in Waller County. Appellant Symm was responsible for registering voters in the county. Persons personally known to Symm or his deputies as county residents, as well as persons who were listed on the tax rolls as owning property in Waller County, were routinely registered upon filling out the state registration form. Those who fell within neither of these categories were required to complete a residency questionnaire, which asked whether the applicant was a college student and, if so, inquired into the student's home address, property ownership, employment status, future plans, and so forth.

On October 14, 1976, the United States Attorney General filed an action against Symm, Waller County, the State of Texas, and its Secretary of State and Attorney General, alleging that use of the questionnaire denied Prairie View students the right to vote in violation of 42 U. S. C. §§ 1971 (a), 1971 (c), 1973, 1973j (d), 1973bb, and the Fourteenth, Fifteenth, and Twenty-sixth Amendments. Pursuant to 42 U. S. C. § 1973bb (a)(2), the United States moved to convene a three-judge District Court. The request for a three-judge court was predicated on the United States' claim for injunctive relief to remedy alleged violations of the Twenty-sixth Amendment. The motion was granted, and a [*1107] three-judge District Court was convened. The District Court found that Symm's registration practices violated the Twenty-sixth Amendment and permanently enjoined him from, among other things, using the questionnaire. Symm appealed from that judgment.

== Opinion of the Court ==
The Court summarily affirmed the appeal (i.e. wrote no opinion).

== Dissent ==
Justice William Rehnquist wrote a dissent, arguing that the District Court mistakenly exercised jurisdiction over Symm. Rehnquist opined, "If the case were here ... on a petition for certiorari and fell within our discretionary jurisdiction, I would have no hesitation in voting to deny certiorari."
