= Howard Pearl =

American politician

Member of the New Hampshire Senate from the 17th district
- Incumbent
- Assumed office December 7, 2022
- Preceded by: John Reagan

Member of the New Hampshire House of Representatives from the Merrimack 26th district
- In office December 5, 2016 – December 7, 2022

Personal details
- Born: December 31, 1969 (age 56)
- Party: Republican
- Spouse: Heather Pearl
- Children: 2
- Education: High School Diploma
- Occupation: Owner, Private Farm

Howard C. Pearl (born December 31, 1969) is an American politician. He is a Republican member of the New Hampshire Senate representing District 17. He was first elected to the Senate on November 8, 2022. He previously served in the New Hampshire House of Representatives from 2016 to 2022.
