= Lou Gargiulo =

American politician

Lou Gargiulo is an American real estate businessman from Hampton Falls, New Hampshire, who spent two terms (1992–1996) as a Republican member of the New Hampshire House of Representatives. He was the Republican nominee for the 24th Senate district in 2020, losing to incumbent Tom Sherman by 4.7 points.

Gargiulo is on the 2026 ballot as a candidate for New Hampshire Senate District 24.

== Career ==
Gargiulo founded the Great North Property Management firm in 1990 in Exeter.

== Special election ==
In 2011, when fellow Republican Gary Wheaton resigned his position representing the Rockingham County 14th House District after multiple arrests, Gargiulo ran in the special election to fill Wheaton's seat. Gargiulo was endorsed by Republican heavyweights such as ex-Governor John H. Sununu, state senator Nancy Stiles, Congressman Frank Guinta, and the New England Right to Work Campaign (among others), but lost in the five-way (Wheaton himself ran for the nomination but received only sixteen votes) Republican primary, which was won by union firefighter and paramedic Kevin Janvrin of Seabrook.

New Hampshire House of Representatives
Preceded by Martha Fuller Clark; John E. Splaine	Member of the New Hampshire House of Representatives from the 25th Rockingham district 1992–1996; Served alongside: George R. Rubin, Deborah L. Woods, John A. Simmons	Succeeded by Deborah L. Woods
