= Daryl Abbas =

American politician (born 1983)

President pro tempore of the New Hampshire Senate
- Incumbent
- Assumed office December 4, 2024
- Preceded by: Jim Gray

Member of the New Hampshire Senate from the 22nd district
- Incumbent
- Assumed office December 7, 2022
- Preceded by: Chuck Morse

Member of the New Hampshire House of Representatives from the Rockingham 8th district
- In office December 5, 2018 – December 7, 2022

Personal details
- Born: November 13, 1983 (age 42)
- Party: Republican
- Spouse: Jessica Abbas
- Children: 2
- Education: Suffolk University (BA, JD)
- Website: Campaign website

Daryl A. Abbas (born November 13, 1983) is an American politician. He is a Republican member of the New Hampshire Senate representing District 22. He was first elected to the Senate on November 8, 2022, defeating Democrat Wayne Haubner 62.6% to 37.4%. He was re-elected in 2024, again defeating Haubner, 63.9% to 36.0%. He served in the New Hampshire House of Representatives from 2018 to 2022.

== Early life and career ==
Abbas is from Salem, New Hampshire, and graduated from Salem High School in 2002. He earned a Bachelor of Arts in political science from Suffolk University in 2006 and a Juris Doctor from Suffolk University Law School in 2009. He has practiced law in New Hampshire, working as a litigation associate and later opening his own law office before becoming a partner at Upper Charles Law Group in 2018.

== Legislative career ==
Abbas chairs the New Hampshire Senate's Children and Family Law Committee and serves as vice chairman of the Judiciary Committee.

In May 2026, Abbas introduced a Senate amendment to a House bill originally known as the "CHARLIE Act", which had proposed restrictions on teaching concepts such as intersectionality and critical race theory in New Hampshire schools. Abbas's amendment replaced the bill's language with a revised version of the state's 2021 "divisive concepts" law, which he said was intended to achieve similar goals while avoiding the constitutional problems that had led a federal court to strike down the earlier law.

== Political positions ==
Abbas voted for a 2023 bill establishing a New Hampshire Housing Champion Designation Program, which provides preferential access to state funding for municipalities that adopt certain housing-friendly land use and infrastructure policies. In 2025, however, he voted against a bill to limit minimum lot sizes in local zoning. He has also voted against several bills to expand net metering for renewable energy and to extend the state's renewable portfolio standard.

New Hampshire Senate
Preceded by Jim Gray	President pro tempore of the New Hampshire Senate; 2024–present	Incumbent
