= Timothy P. Lang =

American politician

Tim Lang

Member of the New Hampshire Senate from the 2nd district
- Incumbent
- Assumed office December 7, 2022
- Preceded by: Bob Giuda
- Succeeded by: Kurt Webber (elect)

Member of the New Hampshire House of Representatives from the 4th Belknap district
- In office December 7, 2016 – December 7, 2022
- Preceded by: Brian Gallagher
- Succeeded by: Travis J. O'Hara

Personal details
- Born: Englewood, New Jersey, U.S.
- Party: Republican
- Children: 4
- Education: Humboldt State University, Western Governors University
- Profession: Northeast Regional IT Director - LiveNation

Timothy P. Lang Sr. is a New Hampshire politician currently serving in the New Hampshire Senate.

Lang has been serving in the New Hampshire House of Representatives since 2016. He was elected to the New Hampshire Senate in Nov 2022.

He attended Humboldt State University from 1985 to 1987, and has a in a Bachelor of Science in Information Technology from Western Governors University.
