= Debra Altschiller =

American politician (born 1968)

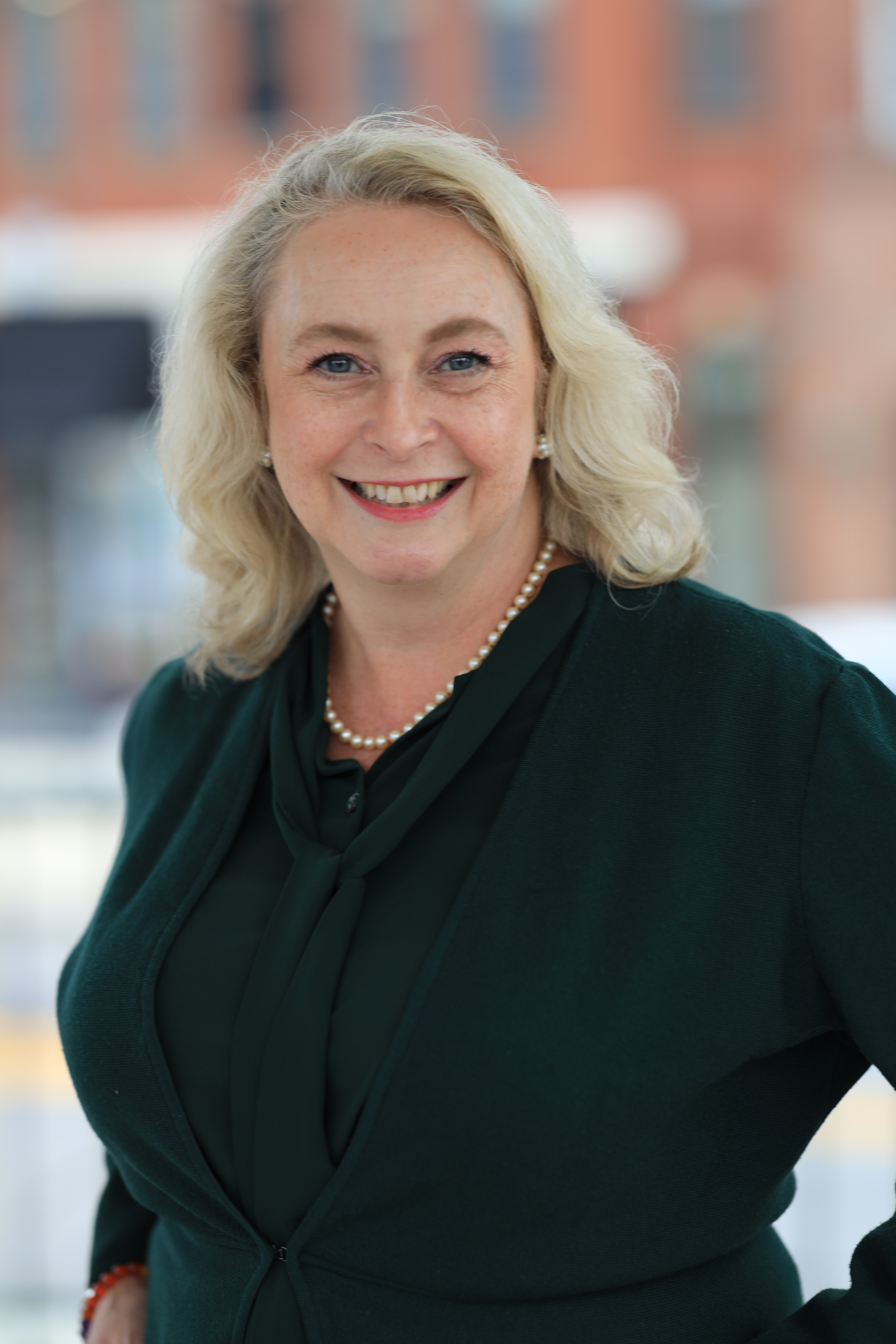
- Official portrait, 2026

Member of the New Hampshire Senate from the 24th district
- Incumbent
- Assumed office December 7, 2022
- Preceded by: Tom Sherman

Member of the New Hampshire House of Representatives from the 19th Rockingham district
- In office December 7, 2016 – December 7, 2022
- Preceded by: Joanne Ward
- Succeeded by: Susan Porcelli (redistricted)

Personal details
- Born: June 1, 1968 (age 58)
- Party: Democratic
- Children: 3
- Education: University of Massachusetts, Amherst (BA)

Debra O’Connell Altschiller (born June 1, 1968) is an American politician serving as a member of the New Hampshire Senate. She previously served in the New Hampshire House of Representatives for the Rockingham 19 district from 2016 to 2022.

== Education ==
Altschiller earned a Bachelor of Arts degree in communication and media studies from the University of Massachusetts Amherst.

== Career ==
From 2007 to 2013, Altschiller worked as a freelance blogger and content writer. From 2012 to 2015, she was the community relations coordinator for Sexual Assault Support Services. Since 2015, she has been the community relations event coordinator for HAVEN NH, a non-profit organization that provides services to victims of domestic violence. Altschiller was elected to the New Hampshire House of Representatives in 2016. She is the Democratic nominee for the 24th district of the New Hampshire Senate in the 2022 election.

== Personal life ==
She is Jewish.
