= Keith Murphy =

American politician

Member of the New Hampshire Senate from the 16th district
- Incumbent
- Assumed office December 7, 2022
- Preceded by: Kevin Cavanaugh

Member of the New Hampshire House of Representatives from the 18th Hillsborough district
- In office December 1, 2010 – December 5, 2018

Personal details
- Party: Republican
- Website: Campaign website

Keith Murphy is an American restaurateur and a Republican member of the New Hampshire Senate, representing the 16th district. Elected in 2022, he was sworn in on December 7, 2022. Murphy previously served as a member of the New Hampshire House of Representatives for Hillsborough District 18 from 2010 to 2018.

The New Hampshire Republican Party chose Murphy to replace Michael Yakubovich, the winner of the primary, when the latter had to step down due to illness. A resident of Manchester, New Hampshire, Murphy defeated Manchester Alderman-at-Large June Trisciani, winner of the Democratic primary, in the general election by 53.4% to 46.6%.

On 19 June 2023, Murphy surrendered himself to the Manchester Police Department on a charge of assaulting one of his employees. Senator Murphy was found not guilty of the charges. Video of the incident did not corroborate the accusations made against him, and Judge James Gleason said in the verdict that witnesses in the three day trial had demonstrated their credibility.
