= Shannon Chandley =

American politician

Member of the New Hampshire Senate from the 11th district
- In office December 7, 2022 – December 4, 2024
- Preceded by: Gary Daniels
- Succeeded by: Tim McGough
- In office December 5, 2018 – December 2, 2020
- Preceded by: Gary Daniels
- Succeeded by: Gary Daniels

Member of the New Hampshire House of Representatives
- In office December 7, 2016 – December 5, 2018
- Preceded by: Multi-member district
- Succeeded by: Multi-member district
- Constituency: Hillsborough 22nd
- In office December 2012 – December 3, 2014
- Preceded by: Multi-member district
- Succeeded by: Multi-member district
- Constituency: Hillsborough 22nd
- In office December 2008 – December 2010
- Preceded by: Multi-member district
- Succeeded by: Multi-member district
- Constituency: Hillsborough 6th

Personal details
- Born: Shannon E. Chandley; September 14, 1962 (age 63) Providence, Rhode Island, U.S.
- Party: Democratic
- Spouse: Tom
- Children: 4
- Education: University of Rhode Island, B.A.
- Website: Campaign website Official website

Shannon E. Chandley (born September 14, 1962) is an American politician from the state of New Hampshire. A Democrat, Chandley represented the 11th district in the New Hampshire Senate from 2018 until 2020, when she was defeated by the seat's former Republican incumbent, Gary Daniels. She defeated Daniels in 2022 and returned to the senate until 2024, when she was defeated by Tim McGough. In March 2026, Chandley announced her candidacy for Senate District 11 in the 2026 Election.

Chandley is married to Thomas Silvia, an executive with VineBrook Homes and a former owner of the New Hampshire Fisher Cats.

Chandley previously served in the New Hampshire House of Representatives for three noncontiguous terms between 2008 and 2010, 2012–2014, and 2016–2018.

In March 2025 Chandley was elected Finance Chair of the New Hampshire Democratic Party
