= Suzanne Prentiss =

American politician (born 1964)

Sue Prentiss

Member of the New Hampshire Senate from the 5th district
- Incumbent
- Assumed office December 2, 2020
- Preceded by: Martha Hennessey

Mayor of Lebanon, New Hampshire
- In office March 29, 2017 – March 27, 2019
- Preceded by: Georgia Tuttle
- Succeeded by: Timothy J. McNamara

Personal details
- Born: October 6, 1964 (age 61)
- Party: Democratic
- Education: Saint Michael's College (BA); University of Phoenix (MPA)

Suzanne M. Prentiss (born October 6, 1964) is an American politician and nationally registered paramedic from Lebanon, New Hampshire. Prentiss is a Democratic member of the New Hampshire Senate, representing the 5th district. She has also served as a member of the Lebanon City Council since 2009 and served as mayor from 2017 to 2019.
