= Cindy Rosenwald =

American politician

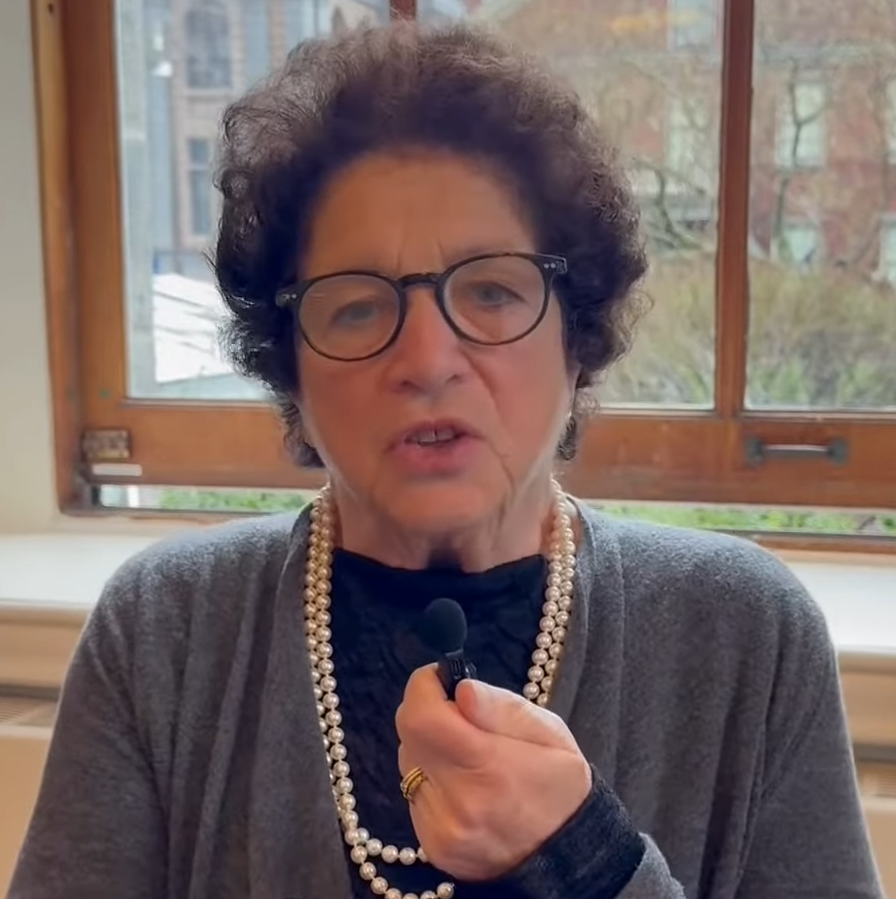
- Rosenwald speaking in 2024

Deputy Minority Leader of the New Hampshire Senate
- Incumbent
- Assumed office December 2, 2020
- Leader: Donna Soucy
- Preceded by: Jeb Bradley

Member of the New Hampshire Senate from the 13th district
- Incumbent
- Assumed office December 5, 2018
- Preceded by: Bette Lasky

Deputy Minority Leader of the New Hampshire House of Representatives
- In office 2015 – December 5, 2018
- Leader: Steve Shurtleff
- Succeeded by: Sherman Packard

Member of the New Hampshire House of Representatives from the Hillsborough 30th district
- In office December 1, 2004 – December 5, 2018

Personal details
- Born: April 23, 1954 (age 72) Rye, New York
- Party: Democratic
- Spouse: Peter Klementowicz
- Education: Harvard College, Rivier College
- Profession: advertising, public relations, educator

Lucinda "Cindy" Rosenwald (born April 23, 1954) is a Democratic state senator for the 13th district of New Hampshire, representing six of Nashua's nine wards since 2018. Rosenwald serves on the Senate Capital Budget, Executive Departments & Administration, and Finance committees. She previously was a member of the New Hampshire House of Representatives, representing the Hillsborough 30th District from 2004 until 2018. In the 2006 elections, when the Democrats took over the state house, Rosenwald was one of two freshman representatives to be placed in leadership.

Rosenwald received her bachelor's degree from Harvard University and her master's degree from Rivier College.

Prior to politics, she worked as a writing instructor at Rivier, as well as at New Hampshire College (now Southern New Hampshire University) and UMass Lowell, where she was eventually made an adjunct professor.

On November 6, 2018, Rosenwald defeated David Schoneman to succeed retiring Senator Bette Lasky.

In April 2026, Rosenwald announced she would not seek reelection in 2026.

== Personal life ==
She is Jewish.
