= Ruth Ward =

American politician (born 1936)

Member of the New Hampshire Senate from the 8th district
- Incumbent
- Assumed office December 7, 2016
- Preceded by: Jerry Little

Personal details
- Born: November 19, 1936 (age 89) China
- Party: Republican

Ruth B. Ward (born November 19, 1936) is an American politician who has served in the New Hampshire Senate from the 8th district since 2016.
