= Kevin Avard =

American politician

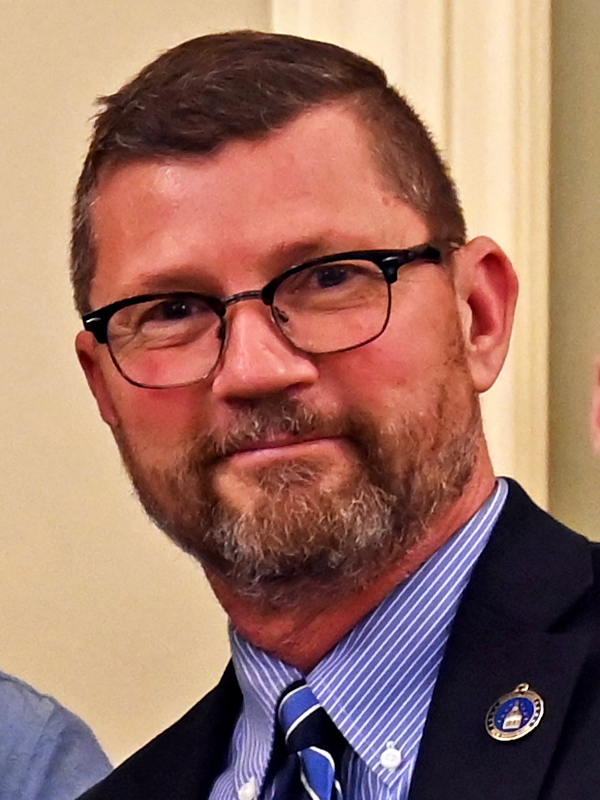

Member of the New Hampshire Senate from the 12th district
- Incumbent
- Assumed office December 2, 2020
- Preceded by: Melanie Levesque
- Succeeded by: Carryl Roy (elect)
- In office December 3, 2014 – December 6, 2018
- Preceded by: Peggy Gilmour
- Succeeded by: Melanie Levesque

Member of the New Hampshire House of Representatives from the Hillsborough 20th district
- In office December 1, 2010 – December 5, 2012 Serving with Carl Seidel; Sean M. McGuinness
- Preceded by: Anthony P. Matarazzo; Ruth Ginsburg
- Succeeded by: Frank A. Byron; Ralph G. Boehm

Personal details
- Born: January 25, 1963 (age 63) Everett, Washington
- Party: Republican
- Spouse: Tracy
- Children: 5
- Education: Liberty University; Northeast Baptist Bible School
- Website: avard4nh.com

Kevin A. Avard (born January 25, 1963) is an American politician and a Republican member of the New Hampshire Senate representing District 12 since 2020 and previously between 2014 and 2018.

== Education ==
Avard studied Bible theology at Liberty University.

== Politics ==
Avard was elected to the New Hampshire Senate in 2014, defeating incumbent Democrat Peggy Gilmour. He also defeated Gilmore in a 2016 rematch to retain his seat.

Avard again stood for election to the state Senate in 2018, but lost his seat to Democratic candidate Melanie Levesque. From 2010 to 2012, he was a member of the New Hampshire House of Representatives.

Avard also served on the Franklin City Council from 2000 to 2002.

=== Education ===
In 2025, Avard co-sponsored House Bill 324, a bill written to ban what primary sponsor Glenn Cordelli described as "obscene or harmful" material from school libraries.

=== Abortion ===
In 2025, Avard introduced Senate Bill 36, which would require medical providers and facilities to report information about abortions they perform to the state Department of Health and Human Services.

== Electoral history ==
New Hampshire's 12th Senate District election, 2014
Party	Candidate	Votes	%
Republican	Kevin Avard	10,839	50.8
Democratic	Peggy Gilmour	10,517	49.2

New Hampshire's 12th Senate District election, 2016
Party	Candidate	Votes	%
Republican	Kevin Avard	15,942	51.32
Democratic	Peggy Gilmour	15,120	48.68

New Hampshire's 12th Senate District election, 2018
Party	Candidate	Votes	%
Democratic	Melanie Levesque	12,521	50.29
Republican	Kevin Avard (i)	12,375	49.71
