= James P. Gray (New Hampshire politician) =

American politician

Jim Gray

President pro tempore of the New Hampshire Senate
- In office December 7, 2022 – December 4, 2024
- Preceded by: Sharon Carson
- Succeeded by: Daryl Abbas

Member of the New Hampshire Senate from the 6th district
- Incumbent
- Assumed office December 7, 2016
- Preceded by: Sam Cataldo

Member of the New Hampshire House of Representatives from the Strafford 8th district
- In office December 2012 – December 7, 2016
- Preceded by: Constituency established
- Succeeded by: Donna Ellis

Personal details
- Born: June 1949 (age 77)
- Party: Republican
- Spouse: Joanne
- Children: 4
- Education: University of New Hampshire (BS)
- Website: Campaign website State Senate website

James P. Gray (born June 1949) is an American politician from the state of New Hampshire. A Republican, Gray has represented the 6th district in the New Hampshire Senate since 2016.

Prior to his election to the Senate, he served two terms in the New Hampshire House of Representatives for Strafford's 8th district. Gray also serves on the Rochester City Council for the 6th ward and previously worked as the town moderator.

In the senate, Gray has served as chair as the election law and municipal affairs committee and vice chair of the health and human services committee since December 2020. He is also chair of the special committee on redistricting from 2021 to 2022. Gray previously chaired the now-decommissioned public and municipal affairs committee from December 2016 to December 2018.

New Hampshire Senate
Preceded by Sharon Carson	President pro tempore of the New Hampshire Senate; 2022–2024	Succeeded by Daryl Abbas
