= New Hampshire Senate =

Upper house of the New Hampshire General Court

Coordinates: 43°12′28.6″N 71°32′09.6″W

New Hampshire State Senate
- New Hampshire General Court

Type
- Type: Upper house
- Term limits: None

History
- New session started: December 4, 2024

Leadership
- President: Sharon Carson (R) since December 4, 2024
- President pro tempore: Daryl Abbas (R) since December 4, 2024
- Majority Leader: Regina Birdsell (R) since December 4, 2024
- Minority Leader: Rebecca Perkins Kwoka (D) since December 4, 2024

Structure
- Seats: 24
- Political groups: Majority: Republican (16); Minority: Democratic (8)
- Length of term: 2 years
- Authority: Part Second, New Hampshire Constitution
- Salary: $200/term + mileage

Elections
- Last election: November 5, 2024 (24 seats)
- Next election: November 3, 2026 (24 seats)
- Redistricting: Legislative control

Meeting place
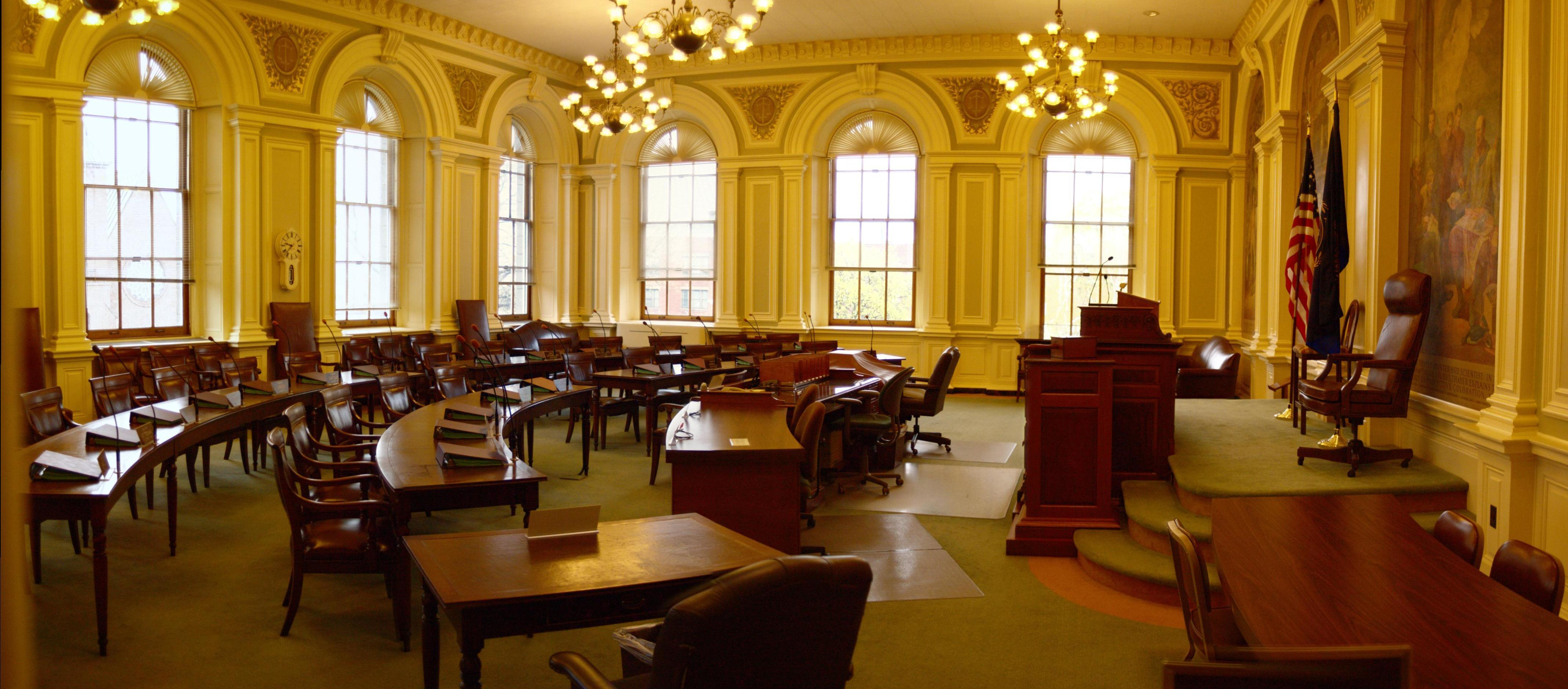
- State Senate Chamber; New Hampshire State House; Concord, New Hampshire

Website
- gencourt.state.nh.us/Senate

The New Hampshire State Senate is the upper house of the New Hampshire General Court, alongside the New Hampshire House of Representatives. The Senate has been meeting since 1784. The senate consists of 24 members representing Senate districts based on population. There are 16 Republicans and 8 Democrats currently serving in the senate.

== History ==
Under the 1776 Constitution, two chambers of the legislature were formed: the House of Assembly and the Council, the predecessors to the modern-day House of Representatives and Senate. The Council was originally elected by the House and was composed of 12 members: five from Rockingham County; 2 each from Cheshire County, Hillsborough County, and Strafford County; and 1 from Grafton County.

In 1784, the state constitution was entirely rewritten, and the upper chamber was reconstituted as the popularly elected Senate. It was originally composed of 12 members to be elected from multi-member districts drawn by the legislature, but this was increased to 24 members in 1879. Until districts were drawn, the apportionment of the Senate was continued from the 1776 Constitution. This constitution also imposed a majority-vote requirement for State Senate elections. If no candidate won a majority of the vote, a vacancy was declared and the full General Court would pick from the top 2 candidates. Similarly, if a vacancy occurred while the legislature was in session, the General Court would pick the successor from the top 2 remaining candidates. The constitution was amended in 1889 to provide that session vacancies would be filled by special elections and in 1912 to abolish the majority-vote requirement altogether.

Between 1784 and 1912, more than 200 state senate vacancies were filled by a full vote of the legislature. During some years, nearly 60% of the State Senate was selected through this method, which frequently determined which party controlled the Senate majority. An analysis of the vacancy-filling patterns shows that the General Court was overwhelmingly likely to fill vacancies based on the party affiliation of the eligible candidates. In cases in which session vacancies were filled, the General Court occasionally selected 3rd-party or independent candidates, who received no more than a handful of votes, over opposing major-party candidates.

The predictability of the vacancy-filling procedures sometimes led to conflict. In 1875, outgoing Democratic Governor James A. Weston exercised his constitutional power to issue "summonses" to the winners of legislative elections to avoid the General Court filling two vacancies. In 2 districts, Democratic candidates won pluralities, but not majorities; the narrow Republican majority in the State House likely meant that the Republican candidates would be elected. The Senate was tied 5–5, so the allocation of the 2 contested seats would determine control. Weston, along with the Executive Council, invalidated votes cast for Republican Senators in 2 districts on the grounds that the votes were not cast in the candidates' "Christian names." They instead issued summonses to the Democratic candidates, who were seated by the Senate. The 7–5 Democratic majority then rejected a Republican challenge to the Democrats' qualifications, and the Republican minority sought an advisory opinion from the New Hampshire Supreme Court. The state supreme court concluded that "the action of the senate is final," and affirmed the seating of the Senators.

In 1912, the voters approved a constitutional amendment removing the majority-vote requirement for all elections. That year, however, the gubernatorial election failed to produce a majority winner, as did 4 State Senate elections. After concluding that the amendment applied after the election, not to it, the General Court proceeded to fill the vacancies. An unexpected alliance between Democrats and Progressive Republicans led to Democrat Samuel D. Felker elected Governor, Henry F. Hollis elected to the U.S. Senate, 4 Democrats selected to fill the State Senate vacancies, and a Progressive Republican as the Speaker of the House.

== 2025–2026 biennial session ==
=== Composition ===
Affiliation	Party (Shading indicates majority caucus)		Total	Vacant
Affiliation	Democratic	Republican	Total	Vacant
End of 164th General Court	10	13	23	1
165th General Court	10	14	24	0
166th General Court	14	10	24	0
167th General Court	10	14	24	0
168th General Court	10	14	24	0
Begin 169th General Court	8	16	24	0
Latest voting share	33.3%	66.7%		

=== Leadership ===
Position	Name	Party	District
President of the Senate	Jeb Bradley	Republican	3
Majority Leader	Sharon Carson	Republican	14
President Pro Tempore	James Gray	Republican	6
Majority Whip	Regina Birdsell	Republican	19
Assistant Majority Leader	Daniel Innis	Republican	7
Minority Leader	Rebecca Perkins Kwoka	Democratic	21
Deputy Minority Leader	Cindy Rosenwald	Democratic	13

=== Committee leadership ===
Committee	Chair	Vice Chair	Ranking Member
Capital Budget	Mark McConkey (R)	James Gray (R)	David Watters (D)
Children and Family Law	Daryl Abbas (R)	Victoria Sullivan (R)	Patrick Long (D)
Commerce	Daniel Innis (R)	Denise Ricciardi (R)	Donovan Fenton (D)
Education	Ruth Ward (R)	Victoria Sullivan (R)	Suzanne Prentiss (D)
Education Finance	Keith Murphy (R)	Timothy Lang Sr. (R)	Cindy Rosenwald (D)
Election Law, Municipal Affairs and Redistricting	James Gray (R)	Timothy Lang Sr. (R)	Rebecca Perkins Kwoka (D)
Energy and Natural Resources	Kevin Avard (R)	Howard Pearl (R)	David Watters (D)
Executive Departments and Administration	Howard Pearl (R)	Tim McGough (R)	Debra Altschiller (D)
Finance	James Gray (R)	Daniel Innis (R)	Cindy Rosenwald (D)
Health and Human Services	David Rochefort (R)	Kevin Avard (R)	Suzanne Prentiss (D)
Judiciary	Bill Gannon (R)	Daryl Abbas (R)	Debra Altschiller (D)
Rules and Enrolled Bills	Kevin Avard (R)	Sharon Carson (R)	Rebecca Perkins Kwoka (D)
Transportation	Denise Ricciardi (R)	Mark McConkey (R)	Donovan Fenton (D)
Ways and Means	Timothy Lang Sr. (R)	Keith Murphy (R)	Cindy Rosenwald (D)

=== Members of the New Hampshire Senate ===
Map of former (March 2021) partisan composition of legislative districts for state senate: Republican senator Democratic senator

District	Name	Party	Residence	Start
1	David Rochefort	Rep	Littleton	2022
2	Timothy Lang Sr.	Rep	Sanbornton	2022
3	Mark McConkey	Rep	Freedom	2024
4	David Watters	Dem	Dover	2012
5	Suzanne Prentiss	Dem	Lebanon	2020
6	James Gray	Rep	Rochester	2016
7	Daniel Innis (Note: Innis previously served in the state senate from 2016–2018.)	Rep	Bradford	2022
8	Ruth Ward	Rep	Stoddard	2016
9	Denise Ricciardi	Rep	Bedford	2020
10	Donovan Fenton	Dem	Keene	2022
11	Tim McGough	Rep	Merrimack	2024
12	Kevin Avard (Note: Avard previously served in the state senate from 2014–2018.)	Rep	Nashua	2020
13	Cindy Rosenwald	Dem	Nashua	2018
14	Sharon Carson	Rep	Londonderry	2008
15	Tara Reardon	Dem	Concord	2024
16	Keith Murphy	Rep	Manchester	2022
17	Howard Pearl	Rep	Loudon	2022
18	Victoria Sullivan	Rep	Manchester	2024
19	Regina Birdsell	Rep	Hampstead	2014
20	Patrick Long	Dem	Manchester	2024
21	Rebecca Kwoka	Dem	Portsmouth	2020
22	Daryl Abbas	Rep	Salem	2022
23	Bill Gannon (Note: Gannon previously served in the state senate from 2016–2018.)	Rep	Sandown	2020
24	Debra Altschiller	Dem	Stratham	2022

== See also ==
- New Hampshire House of Representatives
- List of New Hampshire General Courts
