= 2016 New Hampshire Senate election =

2016 New Hampshire Senate elections
- November 8, 2016

All 24 seats in the New Hampshire Senate 13 seats needed for a majority
	Majority party	Minority party
Leader	Chuck Morse	Jeff Woodburn
Party	Republican	Democratic
Leader since	September 3, 2013	December 1, 2014
Leader's seat	22nd	1st
Last election	14	10
Seats won	14	10
Seat change	Steady	Steady
Popular vote	346,564	341,602
Percentage	50.4%	49.6%
Swing	▲0.6%	▼0.6%
- Results: Republican gain Democratic gain Republican hold Democratic hold
President of the Senate before election
Chuck Morse
Republican
Elected President of the Senate
Chuck Morse
Republican

The 2016 New Hampshire Senate election was held on November 8, 2016, concurrently with the elections for the New Hampshire House of Representatives, to elect members to the 165th New Hampshire General Court.

All 24 seats in the New Hampshire Senate were up for election. It resulted in Republicans maintaining control of both chambers of the New Hampshire General Court. Primary elections were held on September 13, 2016. In addition, Republican Chris Sununu won the open 2016 gubernatorial election, giving the New Hampshire Republican Party total control of the state government for the first time since Republican governor Craig Benson was defeated by Democrat John Lynch in the 2004 gubernatorial election. Furthermore, Democratic nominee Hillary Clinton was able to win the state in the 2016 Presidential election by fewer than 3,000 votes (0.4%) and Democrat Maggie Hassan won the 2016 United States Senate election by around 1,000 votes (0.2%).

== Background ==
In the 2014 New Hampshire state elections, Republicans expanded their majority in the New Hampshire Senate to a margin of 14–10, winning control of the chamber for a third consecutive time. Also in 2014, Republicans regained control of the New Hampshire House of Representatives, while Democratic governor Maggie Hassan won a second two-year term, preventing total Republican control.

=== Predictions ===
Source	Ranking	As of
Governing	Tossup	October 12, 2016

== Campaign ==
A major issue of the campaign was the long planned extension of MBTA's Lowell Line from Lowell towards Nashua, Manchester and Concord as part of the so-called Capital Corridor. Democratic candidates for the General Court were overwhelmingly in favor of the project, while most Republican candidates were opposed. One exception was Daniel Innis, Republican nominee in the 24th district, who stated that "[The project] clearly adds value." The 2016 elections were seen as crucial for the project. In case the project would get political approval, the State of New Hampshire was expected at the time to pay around $72 million of $245.6 million for the construction of the line as well as between $3 Million to $5 million per year for the operation of it.

== Results ==
=== Analysis ===
Despite Hillary Clinton carrying New Hampshire by a small margin in the simultaneous 2016 United States Presidential election, Democrats were not able to achieve significant gains in New Hampshire's state legislature. In total, just two seats changed hands between the parties. On the one hand, State Senate District 7, which was carried by Donald Trump by a 54–40 margin, switched from the Democrats to the Republicans. On the other hand, Democrats flipped State Senate District 16, which was carried by Hillary Clinton by a 48–47 margin.

A total of four districts elected a senator of a different party than the party of the presidential nominee that the district. State Senate Districts 1 and 18 reelected their Democratic senators, despite being carried by Donald Trump. On the other hand, State Senate Districts 9 and 24 reelected their Republican senators, despite being carried by Hillary Clinton.

=== Overview ===
↓
14	10
Republican	Democratic

Source: Official results.

Parties	Candidates	Seats				Popular Vote		
Parties	Candidates	2014	2016	+/-	Strength	Vote	%	Change
Republican	24	14	14	Steady	58.33%	346,564	50.36%	▲0.64%
Democratic	24	10	10	Steady	41.67%	341,602	49.64%	▼0.64%
Total	48	24	24	0	100.00%	551,629	100.00%	-

=== Detailed results ===
==== District 1 ====
Incumbent Democratic state senator Jeff Woodburn had represented the New Hampshire's 1st State Senate District since 2012. Senator Woodburn had also served as Senate Minority Leader since 2014. He won reelection against Republican Dolly McPhaul.

2016 New Hampshire State Senate election, District 1
Primary election
Party	Candidate	Votes	%
Republican	Dolly McPhaul	2,274	51.6
Republican	Leon Rideout	2,130	48.4
Total votes		4,404	100
General election
Democratic	Jeff Woodburn (incumbent)	13,926	54.6
Republican	Dolly McPhaul	11,590	45.4
Total votes		25,516	100
Democratic hold			

==== District 2 ====
Incumbent Republican state senator Jeanie Forrester had represented the New Hampshire's 2nd State Senate District since 2010. She did not run for reelection in 2016. The open seat was won by Republican Bob Giuda against Democrat Charlie Chandler.

2016 New Hampshire State Senate election, District 2
Primary election
Party	Candidate	Votes	%
Republican	Bob Giuda	2,972	54.2
Republican	Brian S. Gallagher	2,514	45.8
Total votes		5,486	100
General election
Republican	Bob Giuda	15,546	54.0
Democratic	Charlie Chandler	13,244	46.0
Total votes		28,790	100
Republican hold			

==== District 3 ====
Incumbent Republican state senator Jeb Bradley had represented the New Hampshire's 3rd State Senate District since 2009. He won reelection against Democrat John White.

2016 New Hampshire State Senate election, District 3
Party	Candidate	Votes	%
Republican	Jeb Bradley (incumbent)	20,091	64.4
Democratic	John White	11,111	35.6
Total votes		31,202	100
Republican hold			

==== District 4 ====
Incumbent Democratic State Senator David Watters had represented the New Hampshire's 4th State Senate District since 2012. He won reelection against Republican Bill O'Connor.

2016 New Hampshire State Senate election, District 4
Party	Candidate	Votes	%
Democratic	David Watters (incumbent)	15,144	55.2
Republican	Bill O'Connor	12,283	44.8
Total votes		27,427	100
Democratic hold			

==== District 5 ====
Incumbent Democratic State Senator David Watters had represented the New Hampshire's 5th State Senate District since 2012. He did not run for reelection in 2016. The open seat was won by Democrat Martha Hennessey against Republican Marie Lobito.

2016 New Hampshire State Senate election, District 5
Party	Candidate	Votes	%
Democratic	Martha Hennessey	18,809	65.3
Republican	Marie Lobito	9,998	34.7
Total votes		28,807	100
Democratic hold			

==== District 6 ====
Incumbent Republican state senator Sam Cataldo had represented the New Hampshire's 6th State Senate District since 2012. He did not run for reelection in 2016. The open seat was won by Republican James Gray against Democrat Joe Casey.

2016 New Hampshire State Senate election, District 6
Party	Candidate	Votes	%
Republican	James Gray	14,481	55.1
Democratic	Joe Casey	11,793	44.9
Total votes		26,274	100
Republican hold			

==== District 7 ====
Incumbent Democratic state senator Andrew Hosmer had represented the New Hampshire's 7th State Senate District since 2012. He was defeated by Republican Harold French.

2016 New Hampshire State Senate election, District 7
Party	Candidate	Votes	%
Republican	Harold French	13,880	50.03
Democratic	Andrew Hosmer (incumbent)	13,863	49.97
Total votes		27,743	100
Republican gain from Democratic			

==== District 8 ====
Incumbent Republican state senator Jerry Little had represented the New Hampshire's 8th State Senate District since 2014. He did not run for reelection in 2016. The open seat was won by Republican Ruth Ward against Democrat John Garvey.

2016 New Hampshire State Senate election, District 8
Primary election
Party	Candidate	Votes	%
Republican	Ruth Ward	2,618	50.1
Republican	Jim Beard	2,609	49.9
Total votes		5,227	100
General election
Republican	Ruth Ward	16,150	53.1
Democratic	John Garvey	14,289	46.9
Total votes		30,439	100
Republican hold			

==== District 9 ====
Incumbent Republican state senator Andy Sanborn had represented the New Hampshire's 9th State Senate District since 2012. He won reelection against Democrat Lee Nyquist.

2016 New Hampshire State Senate election, District 9
Primary election
Party	Candidate	Votes	%
Democratic	Lee Nyquist	2,105	51.0
Democratic	Jeanne Dietsch	2,026	49.0
Total votes		4,131	100
General election
Republican	Andy Sanborn (incumbent)	17,073	53.7
Democratic	Lee Nyquist	14,727	46.3
Total votes		31,800	100
Republican hold			

==== District 10 ====
Incumbent Democratic State Senator Molly Kelly had represented the New Hampshire's 10th State Senate District since 2006. She did not run for reelection in 2016. The open seat was won by Democrat Jay Kahn against Republican Chester Lapointe.

2016 New Hampshire State Senate election, District 10
Primary election
Party	Candidate	Votes	%
Democratic	Jay Kahn	2,706	64.2
Democratic	Kris Roberts	985	23.3
Democratic	Ben Tilton	527	12.5
Total votes		4,218	100
General election
Democratic	Jay Kahn	17,713	63.3
Republican	Chester Lapointe	10,273	36.7
Total votes		27,986	100
Democratic hold			

==== District 11 ====
Incumbent Republican state senator Gary L. Daniels had represented the New Hampshire's 11th State Senate District since 2014. He won reelection against Democrat Peggy Gilmour.

2016 New Hampshire State Senate election, District 11
Party	Candidate	Votes	%
Republican	Gary L. Daniels (incumbent)	17,235	56.6
Democratic	Roger Tilton	13,227	43.4
Total votes		30,462	100
Republican hold			

==== District 12 ====
Incumbent Republican state senator Kevin Avard had represented the New Hampshire's 12th State Senate District since 2014. He won reelection against Democrat Peggy Gilmour.

2016 New Hampshire State Senate election, District 12
Party	Candidate	Votes	%
Republican	Kevin Avard (incumbent)	15,942	51.3
Democratic	Peggy Gilmour	15,120	48.7
Total votes		31,062	100
Republican hold			

==== District 13 ====
Incumbent Republican state senator Bette Lasky had represented the New Hampshire's 13th State Senate District since 2012. She won reelection against Republican Joan Donahue.

2016 New Hampshire State Senate election, District 13
Party	Candidate	Votes	%
Democratic	Bette Lasky (incumbent)	14,619	59.6
Republican	Joan Donahue	9,897	40.4
Total votes		24,516	100
Democratic hold			

==== District 14 ====
Incumbent Republican state senator Sharon Carson had represented the New Hampshire's 14th State Senate District since 2008. She won reelection against Democrat Richard Leonard.

2016 New Hampshire State Senate election, District 14
Primary election
Party	Candidate	Votes	%
Republican	Sharon Carson (incumbent)	3,139	72.3
Republican	Ludwig Haken	1,204	27.7
Total votes		4,343	100
General election
Republican	Sharon Carson (incumbent)	17,793	64.1
Democratic	Richard Leonard	9,989	35.9
Total votes		27,782	100
Republican hold			

==== District 15 ====
Incumbent Democratic state senator Dan Feltes had represented the New Hampshire's 15th State Senate District since 2014. He won reelection against Republican Jeff Newman.

2016 New Hampshire State Senate election, District 15
Party	Candidate	Votes	%
Democratic	Dan Feltes (incumbent)	17,658	61.8
Republican	Jeff Newman	10,913	38.2
Total votes		28,571	100
Democratic hold			

==== District 16 ====
Incumbent Republican state senator David Boutin had represented the New Hampshire's 16th State Senate District since 2010. He did not run for reelection in 2016. The open seat was won by Democrat Scott McGilvray against Republican state representative Joe Duarte.

2016 New Hampshire State Senate election, District 16
Primary election
Party	Candidate	Votes	%
Democratic	Scott McGilvray	2,399	81.1
Democratic	Kolawole Ernest Adewumi	558	18.9
Total votes		2,957	100
Republican	Joe Duarte	4,456	96.3
Republican	Donald Winterton	170	3.7
Total votes		4,626	100
General election
Democratic	Scott McGilvray	15,118	51.0
Republican	Joe Duarte	14,503	49.0
Total votes		29,621	100
Democratic gain from Republican			

==== District 17 ====
Incumbent Republican state senator John Reagan had represented the New Hampshire's 17th State Senate District since 2012. He won reelection against Democrat Nancy R.B. Fraher.

2016 New Hampshire State Senate election, District 17
Party	Candidate	Votes	%
Republican	John Reagan (incumbent)	18,252	61.3
Democratic	Nancy R.B. Fraher	11,522	38.7
Total votes		29,774	100
Republican hold			

==== District 18 ====
Incumbent Democratic state senator Donna Soucy had represented the New Hampshire's 18th State Senate District since 2012. She won reelection against Republican Ross Terrio.

2016 New Hampshire State Senate election, District 18
Primary election
Party	Candidate	Votes	%
Republican	Ross Terrio	1,253	36.7
Republican	George Lambert	1,242	36.3
Republican	Ralph Boehm	924	27.0
Total votes		3,419	100
General election
Democratic	Donna Soucy (incumbent)	13,299	55.0
Republican	Ross Terrio	10,869	45.0
Total votes		24,168	100
Democratic hold			

==== District 19 ====
Incumbent Republican state senator Regina Birdsell had represented the New Hampshire's 19th State Senate District since 2014. She won reelection against Democrat Kristi St. Laurent.

2016 New Hampshire State Senate election, District 19
Party	Candidate	Votes	%
Republican	Regina Birdsell (incumbent)	16,505	58.3
Democratic	Kristi St. Laurent	11,825	41.7
Total votes		28,330	100
Republican hold			

==== District 20 ====
Incumbent Democratic state senator Lou D'Allesandro had represented the New Hampshire's 20th State Senate District since 1998. He won reelection against Republican Carla Gericke.

2016 New Hampshire State Senate election, District 20
Party	Candidate	Votes	%
Democratic	Lou D'Allesandro (incumbent)	13,187	60.3
Republican	Carla Gericke	8,695	39.7
Total votes		21,882	100
Democratic hold			

==== District 21 ====
Incumbent Democratic state senator Martha Fuller Clark had represented the New Hampshire's 21st State Senate District since 2012. She won reelection against Republican Peter Macdonald.

2016 New Hampshire State Senate election, District 21
Party	Candidate	Votes	%
Democratic	Martha Fuller Clark (incumbent)	20,883	66.3
Republican	Peter Macdonald	10,607	33.7
Total votes		31,490	100
Democratic hold			

==== District 22 ====
Incumbent Republican state senator Chuck Morse had represented the New Hampshire's 22nd State Senate District since 2010. He won reelection against Democrat Richard O'Shaughnessy.

2016 New Hampshire State Senate election, District 22
Party	Candidate	Votes	%
Republican	Chuck Morse (incumbent)	18,717	62.4
Democratic	Richard O'Shaughnessy	11,270	37.6
Total votes		29,987	100
Republican hold			

==== District 23 ====
Incumbent Republican state senator Russell Prescott had represented the New Hampshire's 23rd State Senate District since 2010. He did not run for reelection in 2016. The open seat was won by Republican Bill Gannon against Democratic state representative Alexis Simpson.

2016 New Hampshire State Senate election, District 23
Primary election
Party	Candidate	Votes	%
Republican	Bill Gannon	1,850	37.6
Republican	Bob Goodman	1,358	27.6
Republican	Maureen Barrows	923	18.8
Republican	Nancy Steenson	788	16.0
Total votes		4,919	100
General election
Republican	Bill Gannon	17,337	56.5
Democratic	Alexis Simpson	13,343	43.5
Total votes		30,680	100
Republican hold			

==== District 24 ====
Incumbent Republican state senator Nancy Stiles had represented the New Hampshire's 24th State Senate District since 2010. She did not run for reelection in 2016. The open seat was won by Republican Daniel Innis against Democratic state representative Tom Sherman.

2016 New Hampshire State Senate election, District 24
Primary election
Party	Candidate	Votes	%
Republican	Daniel Innis	1,895	35.0
Republican	Ray Tweedie	1,632	30.1
Republican	Stephen Kenda	1,470	27.2
Republican	Jim Maggiore	418	7.7
Total votes		5,415	100
General election
Republican	Daniel Innis	17,844	52.2
Democratic	Tom Sherman	16,373	47.8
Total votes		34,217	100
Republican hold			

== See also ==
- List of New Hampshire General Courts
