= 2024 New Hampshire Senate election =

- November 5, 2024

All 24 seats in the New Hampshire Senate 13 seats needed for a majority
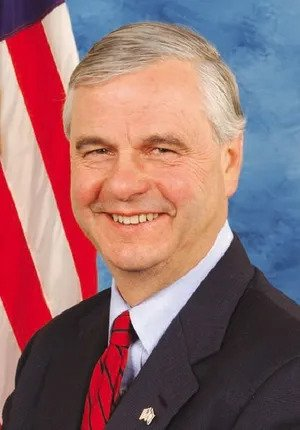

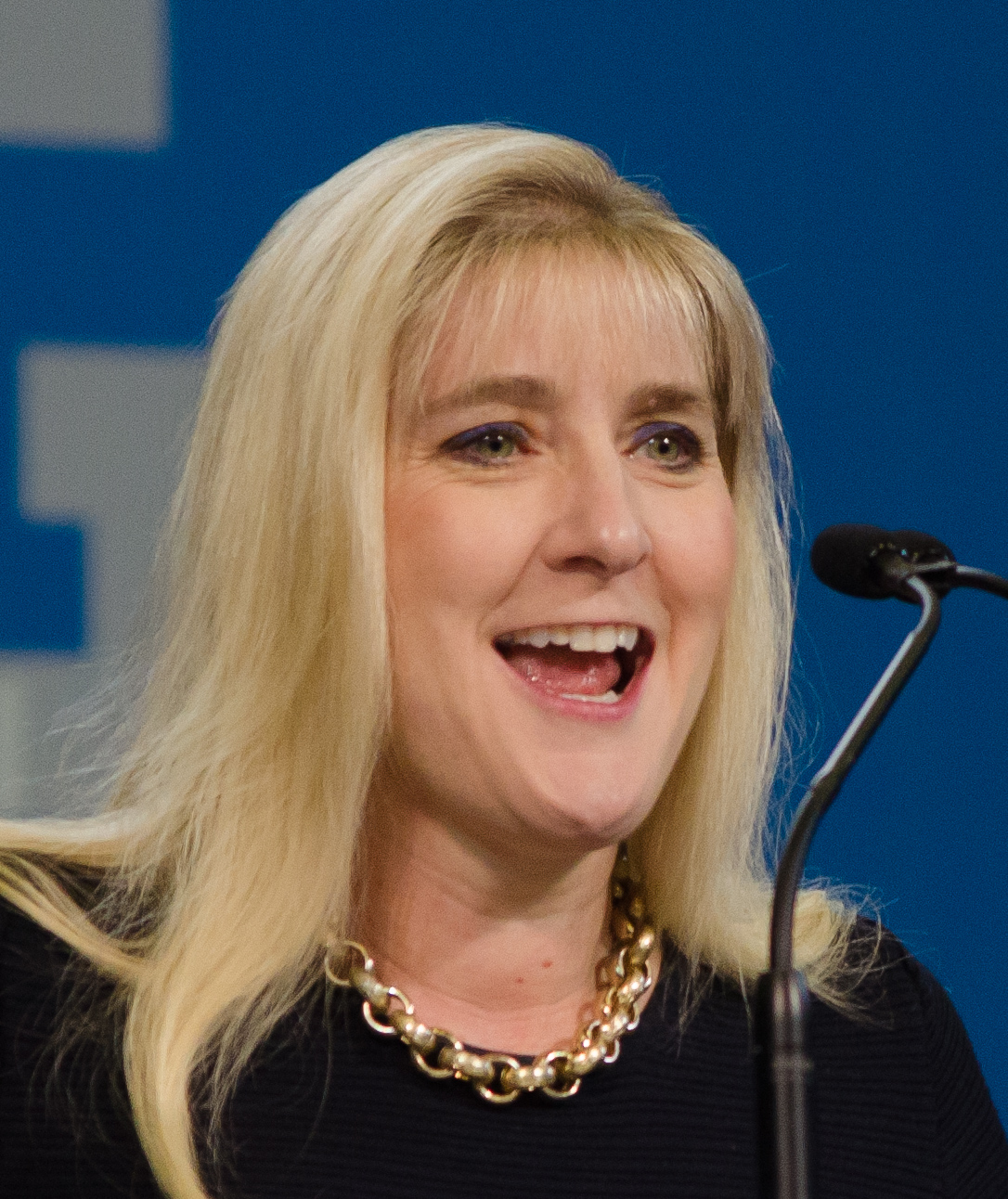
	Majority party	Minority party
Leader	Jeb Bradley (retired)	Donna Soucy (lost re-election)
Party	Republican	Democratic
Leader's seat	3rd District	18th District
Last election	14	10
Seats won	16	8
Seat change	▲2	▼2
Popular vote	403,116	381,716
Percentage	51.33%	48.60%
- Results: Republican gain Republican hold Democratic hold Vote share: 50–60% 60–70% 50–60% 60–70%
President before election
Jeb Bradley
Republican
Elected President
Sharon Carson
Republican

The 2024 New Hampshire Senate elections were held on November 5, 2024, to elect all 24 seats in the New Hampshire Senate. Primary elections were held on September 10, 2024. The elections coincided with the Presidential, U.S. House, and State House elections.

Republicans expanded on their 14-10 majority and earned a 16-8 supermajority after the elections.

== Retirements ==
Four incumbents did not seek re-election.

=== Democrats ===
- District 15: Becky Whitley is retiring.
- District 20: Lou D'Allesandro is retiring.

=== Republicans ===
- District 1: Carrie Gendreau is retiring.
- District 3: Jeb Bradley is retiring.

== Predictions ==
Source	Ranking	As of
Sabato's Crystal Ball	Lean R	October 23, 2024

== Results ==
=== Election ===
2024 New Hampshire Senate election General election — November 5, 2024
New Hampshire House of Representatives 2022
Party	Votes	Percentage	Seats	+/–
Republican	403,116	51.33	16	▲2
Democratic	381,716	48.60	8	▼2
Write-in	568	0.07	0	
**Totals**	**785,400**	**100**	**400**	—

Italics denote an open seat held by the incumbent party; bold text denotes a gain for a party.

State Senate District	Incumbent	Party	Elected Senator	Outcome
1st	Carrie Gendreau	Rep	David Rochefort	Rep Hold
2nd	Timothy Lang	Rep	Timothy Lang	Rep Hold
3rd	Jeb Bradley	Rep	Mark McConkey	Rep Hold
4th	David H. Watters	Dem	David H. Watters	Dem Hold
5th	Suzanne M. Prentiss	Dem	Suzanne M. Prentiss	Dem Hold
6th	James P. Gray	Rep	James P. Gray	Rep Hold
7th	Daniel Innis	Rep	Daniel Innis	Rep Hold
8th	Ruth Ward	Rep	Ruth Ward	Rep Hold
9th	Denise Ricciardi	Rep	Denise Ricciardi	Rep Hold
10th	Donovan Fenton	Dem	Donovan Fenton	Dem Hold
11th	Shannon E. Chandley	Dem	**Tim McGough**	**Rep Gain**
12th	Kevin A. Avard	Rep	Kevin A. Avard	Rep Hold
13th	Cindy Rosenwald	Dem	Cindy Rosenwald	Dem Hold
14th	Sharon M. Carson	Rep	Sharon M. Carson	Rep Hold
15th	Becky Whitley	Dem	Tara Reardon	Dem Hold
16th	Keith Murphy	Rep	Keith Murphy	Rep Hold
17th	Howard Pearl	Rep	Howard Pearl	Rep Hold
18th	Donna Soucy	Dem	**Victoria Sullivan**	**Rep Gain**
19th	Regina M. Birdsell	Rep	Regina M. Birdsell	Rep Hold
20th	Lou D'Allesandro	Dem	Pat Long	Dem Hold
21st	Rebecca Perkins Kwoka	Dem	Rebecca Perkins Kwoka	Dem Hold
22nd	Daryl Abbas	Rep	Daryl Abbas	Rep Hold
23rd	Bill Gannon	Rep	Bill Gannon	Rep Hold
24th	Debra Altschiller	Dem	Debra Altschiller	Dem Hold

== District 1 ==
1st District Democratic primary details

Declared

- Rusty Talbot, Business owner

Democratic Primary, 1st District
Party	Candidate	Votes	%
Democratic	Rusty Talbot	Unopposed	
Total votes		4,247	100.0

1st District Republican primary details

Declared

- David Rochefort, State Representative

Declined

- Carrie Gendreau, Incumbent

Republican Primary, 1st District
Party	Candidate	Votes	%
Republican	David Rochefort	Unopposed	
Total votes		4,951	100.0

New Hampshire's 1st Senate District
Party	Candidate	Votes	%
Republican	David Rochefort	17,613	56.82
Democratic	Rusty Talbot	13,371	43.14
Write-in		12	0.04
Total votes		30,996	100.0
Republican hold			

== District 2 ==
2nd District Democratic primary details

Declared

- Carlos Cardona, Former Campaign Manager for Marianne Williamson’s 2024 Presidential Campaign and 2010, 2018, and 2020 candidate for State Representative

Endorsements

Carlos Cardona

U.S. Representatives

- Ro Khanna, California's 17th congressional district

Democratic Primary, 2nd District
Party	Candidate	Votes	%
Democratic	Carlos Cardona	Unopposed	
Total votes		4,582	100.0

2nd District Republican primary details

Potential

- Timothy Lang Sr., Incumbent

Republican Primary, 2nd District
Party	Candidate	Votes	%
Republican	Timothy Lang Sr.	Unopposed	
Total votes		6,056	100.0

2024 New Hampshire Senate election, 2nd District
Party	Candidate	Votes	%
Republican	Timothy Lang Sr. (Incumbent)	20,117	58.28
Democratic	Carlos Cardona	14,372	41.64
Write-in		28	0.08
Total votes		34,517	100.0
Republican hold			

== District 3 ==
3rd District Democratic primary details

Declared

- William Marsh, Former State Representative and candidate for the district in 2022

Declined

- Thomas Buco, State Representative
- Anita Burroughs, State Representative
- Jerry Stringham, State Representative
- Jerry Knirk, Surgeon and former State Representative

Democratic Primary, 3rd District
Party	Candidate	Votes	%
Democratic	William Marsh	Unopposed	
Total votes		4,857	100.0

3rd District Republican primary details

Declared

- Mark McConkey, State Representative and Chair of the House Public Works and Highways Committee

Declined

- Jeb Bradley, Incumbent
- Glenn Cordelli, State Representative and Vice Chair of the House Education Committee
- Katy Peternel, State Representative
- Michael Granger, State Representative
- Jonathan Smith, State Representative

Republican Primary, 3rd District
Party	Candidate	Votes	%
Republican	Mark McConkey	Unopposed	
Total votes		6,313	100.0

2024 New Hampshire Senate election, 3rd District
Party	Candidate	Votes	%
Republican	Mark McConkey	21,058	56.70
Democratic	Bill Marsh	16,066	43.25
Write-in		19	0.05
Total votes		37,143	100.0
Republican hold			

== District 4 ==
4th District Democratic primary details

Declared

- David H. Watters, Incumbent

Democratic Primary, 4th District
Party	Candidate	Votes	%
Democratic	David H. Watters (Incumbent)	Unopposed	
Total votes		5,219	100.0

4th District Republican primary details

Declared

- Shawn Mickelonis, Former Democratic State Representative

Republican Primary, 4th District
Party	Candidate	Votes	%
Republican	Shawn Mickelonis	Unopposed	
Total votes		3,160	100.0

2024 New Hampshire Senate election, 4th District
Party	Candidate	Votes	%
Democratic	David H. Watters (Incumbent)	19,666	60.45
Republican	Shawn Mickelonis	12,847	39.50
Write-in		15	0.05
Total votes		32,528	100.0
Democratic hold			

== District 5 ==
5th District Democratic primary details

Declared

- Suzanne Prentiss, Incumbent
  Democratic Primary, 5th District
  Party	Candidate	Votes	%
  Democratic	Suzanne Prentiss (Incumbent)	Unopposed	
  Total votes		7,411	100.0

5th District Republican primary details

Declared

- John McIntyre, Radiologist

Republican Primary, 5th District
Party	Candidate	Votes	%
Republican	John McIntyre	Unopposed	
Total votes		2,769	100.0

2024 New Hampshire Senate election, 5th District
Party	Candidate	Votes	%
Democratic	Suzanne Prentiss (Incumbent)	23,028	66.21
Republican	John J. McIntyre	11,709	33.67
Write-in		42	0.12
Total votes		34,779	100.0
Democratic hold			

== District 6 ==
6th District Democratic primary details

Declared

- John Ceskavich

Democratic Primary, 6th District
Party	Candidate	Votes	%
Democratic	John Ceskavich	Unopposed	
Total votes		3,249	100.0

6th District Republican primary details

Declared

- James Gray, Incumbent

Republican Primary, 6th District
Party	Candidate	Votes	%
Republican	James Gray (Incumbent)	Unopposed	
Total votes		4,887	100.0

2024 New Hampshire Senate election, 6th District
Party	Candidate	Votes	%
Republican	James P. Gray (Incumbent)	18,561	59.77
Democratic	John Ceskavich	12,483	40.19
Write-in		13	0.04
Total votes		31,057	100.0
Republican hold			

== District 7 ==
7th District Democratic primary details

Democratic Primary, 7th District
Party	Candidate	Votes	%
Democratic	Stu Green	Unopposed	
Total votes		4,681	100.0

7th District Republican primary details

Declared

- Daniel Innis, Incumbent

Republican Primary, 7th District
Party	Candidate	Votes	%
Republican	Daniel Innis (Incumbent)	Unopposed	
Total votes		5,260	100.0

2024 New Hampshire Senate election, 7th District
Party	Candidate	Votes	%
Republican	Daniel Innis (Incumbent)	17,888	55.48
Democratic	Stu Green	14,337	44.47
Write-in		17	0.05
Total votes		32,242	100.0
Republican hold			

== District 8 ==
8th District Democratic primary details

Democratic Primary, 8th District
Party	Candidate	Votes	%
Democratic	David Trumble	Unopposed	
Total votes		4,368	100.0

8th District Republican primary details

Republican Primary, 8th District
Party	Candidate	Votes	%
Republican	Ruth Ward (Incumbent)	Unopposed	
Total votes		5,292	100.0

2024 New Hampshire Senate election, 8th District
Party	Candidate	Votes	%
Republican	Ruth Ward (Incumbent)	18,463	58.25
Democratic	David Trumble	13,178	41.63
Write-in		12	0.04
Total votes		31,653	100.0
Republican hold			

== District 9 ==
9th District Democratic primary details

Declared

- Matthew McLaughlin, Veteran and candidate for the district in 2022

Democratic Primary, 9th District
Party	Candidate	Votes	%
Democratic	Matthew McLaughlin	Unopposed	
Total votes		4,681	100.0

9th District Republican primary details

Potential

- Denise Ricciardi, Incumbent

Republican Primary, 9th District
Party	Candidate	Votes	%
Republican	Denise Riccardi (Incumbent)	Unopposed	
Total votes		5,597	100.0

2024 New Hampshire Senate election, 9th District
Party	Candidate	Votes	%
Republican	Denise Ricciardi (Incumbent)	17,235	51.49
Democratic	Matthew McLaughlin	16,211	48.43
Write-in		25	0.08
Total votes		33,471	100.0
Republican hold			

== District 10 ==
10th District Democratic primary details

Declared

- Donovan Fenton, Incumbent

Democratic Primary, 10th District
Party	Candidate	Votes	%
Democratic	Donovan Fenton (Incumbent)	Unopposed	
Total votes		7,015	100.0

10th District Republican primary details

Republican Primary, 10th District
Party	Candidate	Votes	%
Republican	Rich Merkt	Unopposed	
Total votes		3,007	100.0

2024 New Hampshire Senate election, 10th District
Party	Candidate	Votes	%
Democratic	Donovan Fenton (Incumbent)	20,841	63.12
Republican	Rick Merkt	12,166	36.85
Write-in		11	0.03
Total votes		33,018	100.0
Democratic hold			

== District 11 ==
11th District Democratic primary details

Potential

- Shannon Chandley, Incumbent

Democratic Primary, 11th District
Party	Candidate	Votes	%
Democratic	Shannon Chandley (Incumbent)	Unopposed	
Total votes		4,774	100.0

11th District Republican primary details

Declared

- Tim McGough, State Representative

Republican Primary, 11th District
Party	Candidate	Votes	%
Republican	Tim McGough	Unopposed	
Total votes		5,565	100.0

2024 New Hampshire Senate election, 11th District
Party	Candidate	Votes	%
Republican	Tim McGough	18,440	50.90
Democratic	Shannon Chandley (Incumbent)	17,767	49.05
Write-in		17	0.05
Total votes		36,224	100.0
Republican gain from Democratic			

== District 12 ==
12th District Democratic primary details

Declared

- Ben Ming, State Representative

Declined

- Melanie Levesque, Former State Senator and candidate for this district in 2022 (ran for Executive Council)

Democratic Primary, 12th District
Party	Candidate	Votes	%
Democratic	Ben Ming (Incumbent)	Unopposed	
Total votes		4,495	100.0

12th District Republican primary details

Declared

- Kevin Avard, incumbent

Republican Primary, 12th District
Party	Candidate	Votes	%
Republican	Kevin Avard (Incumbent)	Unopposed	
Total votes		5,693	100.0

2024 New Hampshire Senate election, 12th District
Party	Candidate	Votes	%
Republican	Kevin Avard (Incumbent)	19,841	55.88
Democratic	Ben Ming	15,643	44.06
Write-in		21	0.06
Total votes		35,505	100.0
Republican hold			

== District 13 ==
13th District Democratic primary details

Potential

- Cindy Rosenwald, Incumbent

Democratic Primary, 13th District
Party	Candidate	Votes	%
Democratic	Cindy Rosenwald (Incumbent)	Unopposed	
Total votes		3,190	100.0

13th District Republican primary details

Declared

- Stephen Scaer, Candidate for this district in 2022

Republican Primary, 13th District
Party	Candidate	Votes	%
Republican	Stephen Scaer	Unopposed	
Total votes		2,573	100.0

2024 New Hampshire Senate election, 13th District
Party	Candidate	Votes	%
Democratic	Cindy Rosenwald (Incumbent)	14,334	56.72
Republican	Stephen Scaer	10,913	43.19
Write-in		23	0.09
Total votes		25,270	100.0
Democratic hold			

== District 14 ==
14th District Democratic primary details

Democratic Primary, 14th District
Party	Candidate	Votes	%
Democratic	Kara Roy	Unopposed	
Total votes		3,072	100.0

14th District Republican primary details

Declared

- Sharon Carson, New Hampshire Senate Majority Leader

Republican Primary, 14th District
Party	Candidate	Votes	%
Republican	Sharon Carson (Incumbent)	Unopposed	
Total votes		5,175	100.0

2024 New Hampshire Senate election, 14th District
Party	Candidate	Votes	%
Republican	Sharon Carson (Incumbent)	19,429	58.76
Democratic	Kara Roy	13,611	41.17
Write-in		24	0.07
Total votes		33,064	100.0
Republican hold			

== District 15 ==
15th District Democratic primary details

Declared

- Angela Brennan, State Representative and Bow, New Hampshire Selectwoman
- Rebecca McWilliams, State Representative
- Tara Reardon, Merrimack County, New Hampshire Commissioner

Declined

- Becky Whitley, Incumbent (Ran for Congress)

Democratic Primary, 15th District
Party	Candidate	Votes	%
Democratic	Tara Reardon	3,544	40.80
Democratic	Rebecca McWilliams	3,179	36.60
Democratic	Angela Brennan	1,963	22.60
Total votes		8,686	100.00

15th District Republican primary details

Declared

- Pamela Ean, 2020 and 2010 candidate for State Representative and candidate for this district in 2018

Republican Primary, 15th District
Party	Candidate	Votes	%
Republican	Pamela Ean	Unopposed	
Total votes		3,554	100.0

2024 New Hampshire Senate election, 15th District
Party	Candidate	Votes	%
Democratic	Tara Reardon	20,272	62.89
Republican	Pamela Ean	11,912	36.95
Write-in		53	0.16
Total votes		32,237	100.0
Democratic hold			

== District 16 ==
16th District Democratic primary details

Democratic Primary, 16th District
Party	Candidate	Votes	%
Write-In	Mike York	Unopposed	
Total votes		802	100.0

16th District Republican primary details

Declared

- Keith Murphy, Incumbent

Republican Primary, 16th District
Party	Candidate	Votes	%
Republican	Keith Murphy (Incumbent)	Unopposed	
Total votes		5,452	100.0

2024 New Hampshire Senate election, 16th District
Party	Candidate	Votes	%
Republican	Keith Murphy (Incumbent)	18,435	56.63
Democratic	Michael York	14,080	43.25
Write-in		39	0.12
Total votes		32,554	100.0
Republican hold			

== District 17 ==
17th District Democratic primary details

Democratic Primary, 17th District
Party	Candidate	Votes	%
Democratic	Kelly Roberts	Unopposed	
Total votes		4,689	100.0

17th District Republican primary details

Republican Primary, 17th District
Party	Candidate	Votes	%
Republican	Howard Pearl (Incumbent)	Unopposed	
Total votes		6,490	100.0

2024 New Hampshire Senate election, 17th District
Party	Candidate	Votes	%
Republican	Howard Pearl (Incumbent)	19,762	57.72
Democratic	Kelly Roberts	14,456	42.23
Write-in		16	0.05
Total votes		34,234	100.0
Republican hold			

== District 18 ==
18th District Democratic primary details

Potential

- Donna Soucy, Incumbent

Democratic Primary, 18th District
Party	Candidate	Votes	%
Democratic	Donna Soucy (Incumbent)	Unopposed	
Total votes		3,234	100.0

18th District Republican primary details

Declared

- Victoria Sullivan, Former State Representative and candidate for mayor of Manchester in 2021 and 2019

Republican Primary, 18th District
Party	Candidate	Votes	%
Republican	Victoria Sullivan	Unopposed	
Total votes		3,777	100.0

2024 New Hampshire Senate election, 18th District
Party	Candidate	Votes	%
Republican	Victoria Sullivan	13,289	51.42
Democratic	Donna Soucy (Incumbent)	12,541	48.52
Write-in		16	0.06
Total votes		25,848	100.0
Republican gain from Democratic			

== District 19 ==
19th District Democratic primary details

Democratic Primary, 19th District
Party	Candidate	Votes	%
Democratic	Michelle Moge	Unopposed	
Total votes		2,774	100.0

19th District Republican primary details

Republican Primary, 19th District
Party	Candidate	Votes	%
Republican	Regina Birdsell (Incumbent)	Unopposed	
Total votes		5,077	100.0

2024 New Hampshire Senate election, 19th District
Party	Candidate	Votes	%
Republican	Regina Birdsell (Incumbent)	19,505	60.76
Democratic	Michelle Moge	12,556	39.11
Write-in		41	0.13
Total votes		32,102	100.0
Republican hold			

== District 20 ==
20th District Democratic primary details

Declared

- Patrick Long, State Representative
- Sean Parr, Manchester, New Hampshire School Committee member

Declined

- Jerome Duval, Lawyer and 2020 Executive Council candidate
- Lou D'Allesandro, Incumbent
- Patricia Cornell, State Representative (ran for reelection)

Democratic Primary, 20th District
Party	Candidate	Votes	%
Democratic	Pat Long	2,565	68.99
Democratic	Sean Parr	1,153	31.01
Total votes		3,718	100.00

20th District Republican primary details

Republican Primary, 20th District
Party	Candidate	Votes	%
Republican	Brittany Ping	Unopposed	
Total votes		2,531	100.0

2024 New Hampshire Senate election, 20th District
Party	Candidate	Votes	%
Democratic	Pat Long	13,159	56.05
Republican	Brittany Ping	10,290	43.83
Write-in		27	0.12
Total votes		23,476	100.0
Democratic hold			

== District 21 ==
21st District Democratic primary details

Democratic Primary, 21st District
Party	Candidate	Votes	%
Democratic	Rebecca Perkins Kwoka (Incumbent)	Unopposed	
Total votes		7,329	100.0

21st District Republican primary details

Republican Primary, 21st District
Party	Candidate	Votes	%
Republican	Don Cardinale	Unopposed	
Total votes		2,707	100.0

2024 New Hampshire Senate election, 21st District
Party	Candidate	Votes	%
Democratic	Rebecca Perkins Kwoka (Incumbent)	22,700	66.98
Republican	Don Cardinale	11,155	32.91
Write-in		38	0.11
Total votes		33,893	100.0
Democratic hold			

== District 22 ==
22nd District Democratic primary details

Democratic Primary, 22nd District
Party	Candidate	Votes	%
Democratic	Wayne Haubner	Unopposed	
Total votes		2,630	100.0

22nd District Republican primary details

Republican Primary, 22nd District
Party	Candidate	Votes	%
Republican	Daryl Abbas (Incumbent)	Unopposed	
Total votes		5,920	100.0

2024 New Hampshire Senate election, 22nd District
Party	Candidate	Votes	%
Republican	Daryl Abbas (Incumbent)	22,892	63.94
Democratic	Wayne Haubner	12,899	36.03
Write-in		9	0.03
Total votes		35,800	100.0
Republican hold			

== District 23 ==
23rd District Democratic primary details

Democratic Primary, 23rd District
Party	Candidate	Votes	%
Democratic	Brenda Oldak	Unopposed	
Total votes		3,491	100.0

23rd District Republican primary details

Republican Primary, 23rd District
Party	Candidate	Votes	%
Republican	Bill Gannon (Incumbent)	5,782	67.02
Republican	Emily Phillips	2,845	32.98
Total votes		8,627	100.00

2024 New Hampshire Senate election, 23rd District
Party	Candidate	Votes	%
Republican	Bill Gannon (Incumbent)	22,670	62.36
Democratic	Brenda Oldak	13,648	37.54
Write-in		36	0.10
Total votes		36,354	100.0
Republican hold			

== District 24 ==
24th District Democratic primary details

Potential

- Debra Altschiller, incumbent

Democratic Primary, 24th District
Party	Candidate	Votes	%
Democratic	Debra Altschiller (Incumbent)	Unopposed	
Total votes		6,296	100.0

24th District Republican primary details

Declared

- Patrick Abrami, Former State Representative

Republican Primary, 24th District
Party	Candidate	Votes	%
Republican	Patrick Abrami	Unopposed	
Total votes		5,281	100.0

2024 New Hampshire Senate election, 24th District
Party	Candidate	Votes	%
Democratic	Debra Altschiller (Incumbent)	20,497	54.74
Republican	Patrick Abrami	16,926	45.22
Write-in		14	0.04
Total votes		37,437	100.0
Democratic hold			

== See also ==
- List of New Hampshire General Courts
