= New Hampshire's 3rd State Senate district =

American legislative district

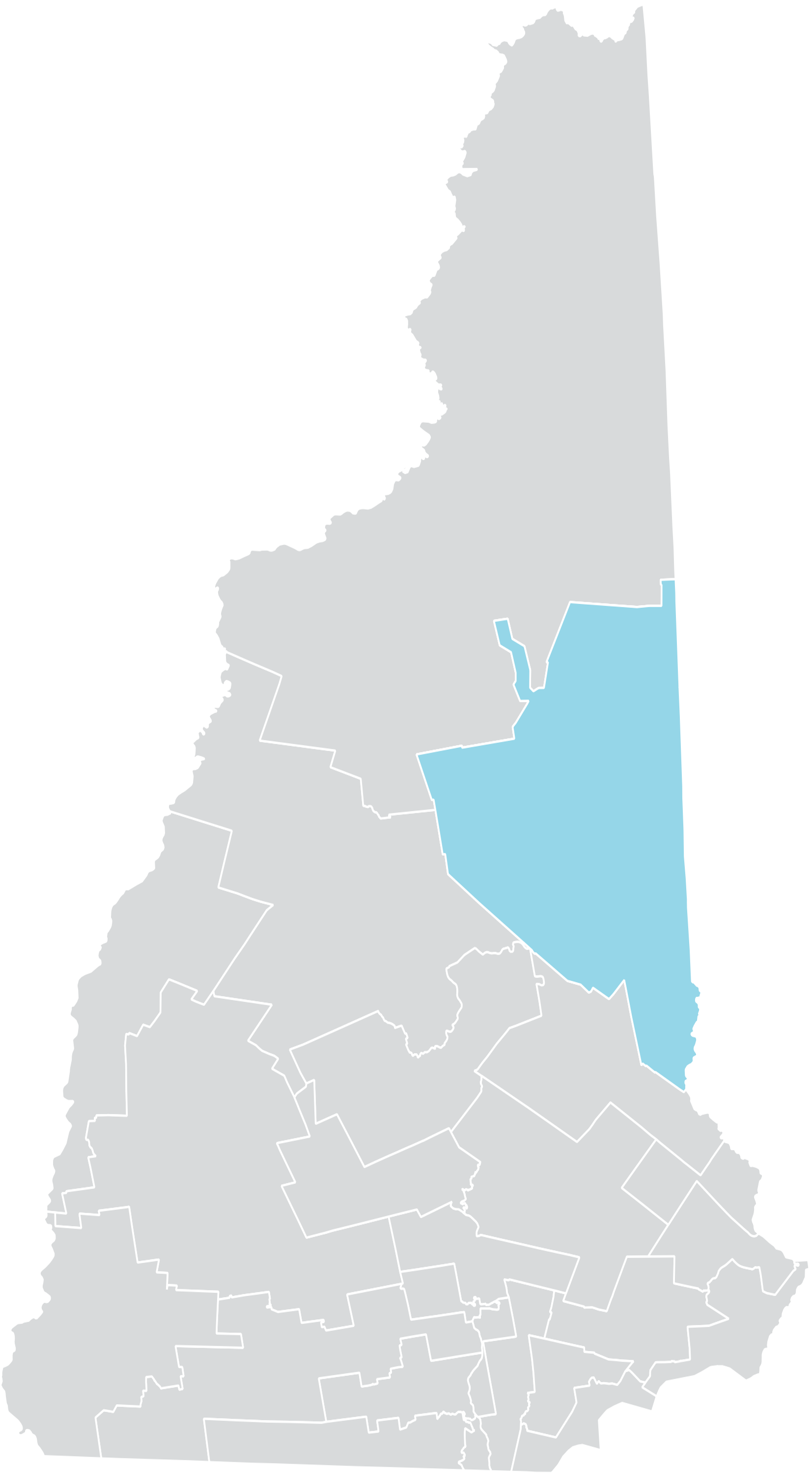
Senator
Mark McConkey; R–Freedom
- Registration: 32.9% Republican; 22.9% Democratic; 44.2% No party preference
- Demographics: 95.9% White; 0.5% Black; 1.4% Hispanic; 0.6% Asian
- Population (2019) • Citizens of voting age: 54,727; 44,764

New Hampshire's 3rd State Senate district is one of 24 districts in the New Hampshire Senate. It has been represented by Republican Mark McConkey since 2024.

== Geography ==
District 3 covers all of Carroll County as well as small portions of Coos, Grafton and Strafford Counties in the central-eastern portion of the state. It includes the towns of Albany, Bartlett, Brookfield, Chatham, Conway, Eaton, Effingham, Freedom, Hale's Location, Hart's Location, Jackson, Madison, Moultonborough, Ossipee, Sandwich, Tamworth, Tuftonboro, Wakefield, and Wolfeboro in Carroll County; Waterville Valley in Grafton County; and Middleton and Milton in Strafford County. It also comprises a few mostly uninhabited and unincorporated townships in souther Coos County.

The district is located almost entirely within New Hampshire's 1st congressional district, with a small portion extending into the 2nd congressional district. It borders the state of Maine.

== Recent election results ==
=== 2024 ===
2024 New Hampshire State Senate election, District 3
Party	Candidate	Votes	%
Republican	Mark McConkey	21,058	56.70
Democratic	Bill Marsh	16,066	43.25
Write-in		19	0.05
Total votes		37,143	100.0
Republican hold			

=== 2022 ===
2022 New Hampshire State Senate election, District 3
Party	Candidate	Votes	%
Republican	Jeb Bradley (incumbent)	17,336	58.48
Democratic	William Marsh	12,309	41.52
Total votes		29,645	100.0

=== 2020 ===
2020 New Hampshire State Senate election, District 3
Party	Candidate	Votes	%
Republican	Jeb Bradley (incumbent)	22,086	61.5
Democratic	Theresa Swanick	13,826	38.5
Total votes		35,912	100
Republican hold			

=== 2018 ===
2018 New Hampshire State Senate election, District 3
Primary election
Party	Candidate	Votes	%
Republican	Jeb Bradley (incumbent)	4,326	77.4
Republican	Steven Steiner	1,262	22.6
Total votes		5,588	100
General election
Republican	Jeb Bradley (incumbent)	14,841	56.6
Democratic	Christopher Meier	10,895	41.5
Libertarian	Tania Butler	506	1.9
Total votes		26,242	100
Republican hold			

=== 2016 ===
2016 New Hampshire State Senate election, District 3
Party	Candidate	Votes	%
Republican	Jeb Bradley (incumbent)	20,091	64.4
Democratic	John White	11,111	35.6
Total votes		31,202	100
Republican hold			

=== 2014 ===
2014 New Hampshire State Senate election, District 3
Party	Candidate	Votes	%
Republican	Jeb Bradley (incumbent)	14,409	64.4
Democratic	John White	7,950	35.6
Total votes		22,359	100
Republican hold			

=== 2012 ===
2012 New Hampshire State Senate election, District 3
Party	Candidate	Votes	%
Republican	Jeb Bradley (incumbent)	18,152	60.9
Democratic	Jeffery Ballard	11,650	39.1
Total votes		29,802	100
Republican hold			

=== Federal and statewide results ===
Year	Office	Results
2020	President	Trump 49.5 – 49.2%
2016	President	Trump 51.2 – 43.8%
2014	Senate	Shaheen 50.4 – 49.6%
2014	Governor	Havenstein 50.4 – 49.6%
2012	President	Romney 49.9 – 49.1%
2012	Governor	Hassan 51.6 – 46.0%
