= Kenneth Dahlberg =

Kenneth Dahlberg may refer to:

- Kenneth A. Dahlberg, American political scientist
- Kenneth C. Dahlberg, American engineer and businessman
- Kenneth H. Dahlberg (1917–2011), American World War II fighter ace and businessman who was involved in the Watergate scandal
