= Gendreau =

Gendreau may refer to:

== People with the surname ==
- Alan Gendreau (born 1989), American former college football player
- Carrie Gendreau, American politician from New Hampshire

== Other ==
- USS Gendreau

== See also ==
- Gender and authoritarianism
