= New Hampshire's 19th State Senate district =

American legislative district

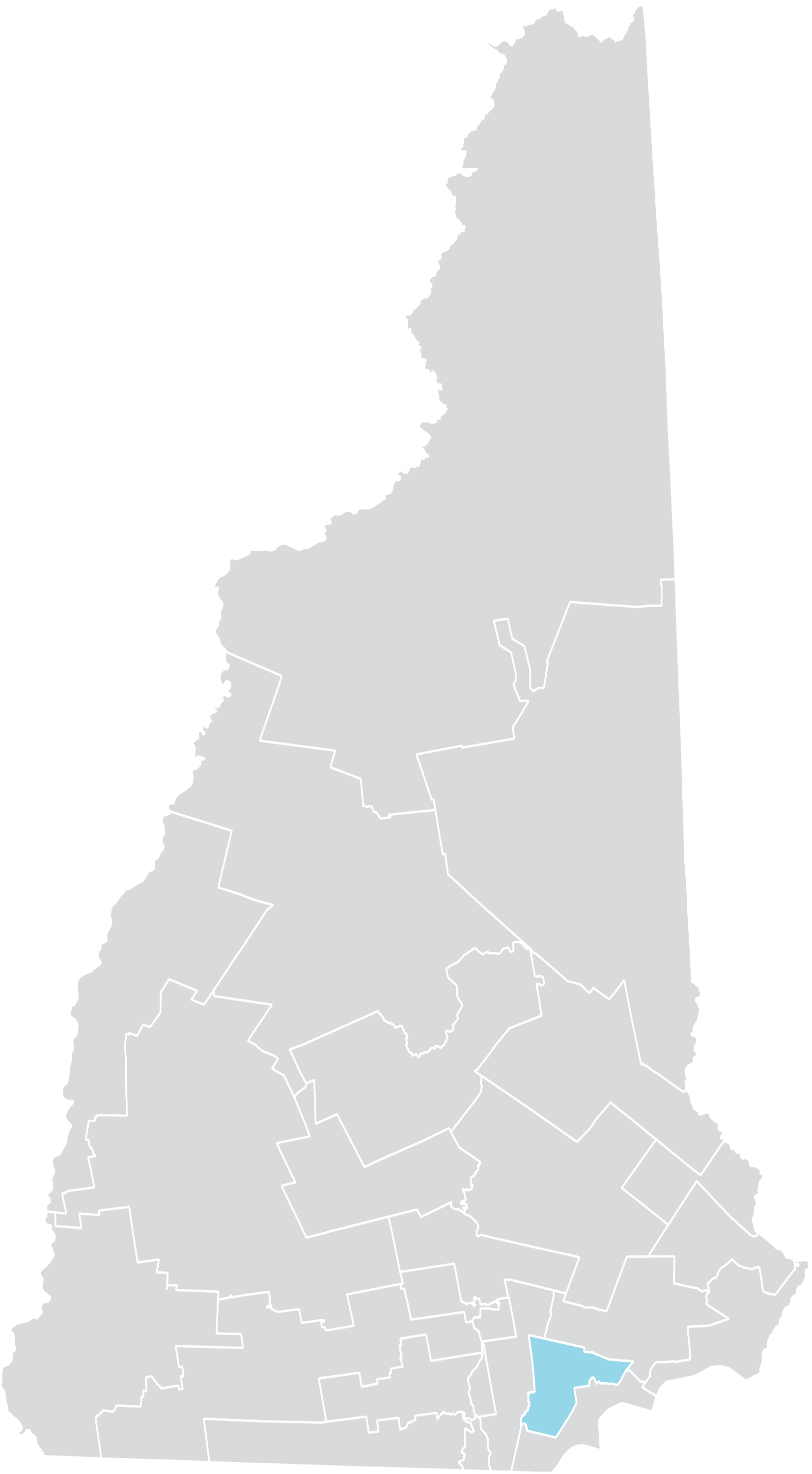
Senator
Regina Birdsell; R–Hampstead
- Registration: 35.2% Republican; 25.8% Democratic; 38.8% No party preference
- Demographics: 92.2% White; 0.8% Black; 3.7% Hispanic; 1.8% Asian
- Population (2019) • Citizens of voting age: 56,679; 42,945

New Hampshire's 19th State Senate district is one of 24 districts in the state Senate of the U.S. state of New Hampshire. It has been represented by Republican Regina Birdsell since 2014, succeeding fellow Republican Jim Rausch.

== Geography ==
District 19 covers the Rockingham County towns of Derry, Hampstead, and Windham.

The district overlaps with both New Hampshire's 1st congressional district and New Hampshire's 2nd congressional district.

== Recent election results ==
=== 2024 ===
2024 New Hampshire State Senate election, District 19
Party	Candidate	Votes	%
Republican	Regina Birdsell (Incumbent)	19,505	60.76
Democratic	Michelle Moge	12,556	39.11
Write-in		41	0.13
Total votes		32,102	100.0
Republican hold			

=== 2022 ===
2022 New Hampshire State Senate election, District 19
Party	Candidate	Votes	%
Republican	Regina Birdsell (incumbent)	15,143	100.0
Total votes		15,253	100.0

=== 2020 ===
2020 New Hampshire State Senate election, District 19
Party	Candidate	Votes	%
Republican	Regina Birdsell (incumbent)	18,263	57.5
Democratic	Joshua Bourdon	13,477	42.5
Total votes		31,740	100
Republican hold			

=== 2018 ===
2018 New Hampshire State Senate election, District 19
Party	Candidate	Votes	%
Republican	Regina Birdsell (incumbent)	12,192	56.8
Democratic	Kristina Durocher	9,269	43.2
Total votes		21,461	100
Republican hold			

=== 2016 ===
2016 New Hampshire State Senate election, District 19
Party	Candidate	Votes	%
Republican	Regina Birdsell (incumbent)	16,505	58.3
Democratic	Kristi St. Laurent	11,825	41.7
Total votes		28,330	100
Republican hold			

=== 2014 ===
2014 New Hampshire State Senate election, District 19
Primary election
Party	Candidate	Votes	%
Republican	Regina Birdsell	1,980	40.0
Republican	Jim Foley	1,527	30.8
Republican	Frank Sapareto	1,447	29.2
Total votes		4,954	100
General election
Republican	Regina Birdsell	11,561	61.4
Democratic	Kristi St. Laurent	7,275	38.6
Total votes		18,836	100
Republican hold			

=== 2012 ===
2012 New Hampshire State Senate election, District 19
Primary election
Party	Candidate	Votes	%
Republican	Jim Rausch (incumbent)	15,927	60.3
Democratic	Christopher Reisdorf	10,473	39.7
Total votes		26,400	100
Republican hold			

=== Federal and statewide results ===
Year	Office	Results
2020	President	Trump 53.2 – 45.4%
2020	Senate	Shaheen 49.2 – 48.7%
2016	President	Trump 55.5 – 39.6%
2014	Senate	Brown 60.8 – 39.2%
2014	Governor	Havenstein 57.5– 42.5%
2012	President	Romney 56.5 – 42.3%
2012	Governor	Lamontagne 50.9 – 46.1%
