= Brian Gallagher (disambiguation) =

Brian Gallagher (born 1959) is an American nonprofit executive.

Brian Gallagher may also refer to:

- Brian Gallagher (footballer, born 1938) (1938–2011), English footballer, see List of Bury F.C. players
- Brian Gallagher (footballer) (born 1945), Scottish footballer
- Brian S. Gallagher, American politician

== See also ==
- Bryan Gallagher (1911–1982), Australian Roman Catholic bishop
- Brian Gallacher (born 1958), Scottish footballer
