= Matthew McLaughlin =

American politician

Member-elect of the New Hampshire Senate from the 9th district
- Assuming office December 2026
- Succeeding: Denise Ricciardi

Personal details
- Party: Democratic

Matthew McLaughlin is an American politician. A member of the Democratic Party, he is the member-elect for the 9th district of the New Hampshire Senate.
