= Ben Tilton =

American politician (born 1953)

Member of the New Hampshire House of Representatives from the Cheshire 12 district
- In office 2014–2016

Personal details
- Born: 1953 (age 72–73)
- Party: Democratic
- Education: Keene State College

Benjamin Tilton (born 1953) is an American politician. A Democrat, he was a member of the New Hampshire House of Representatives and represented Cheshire 12th district from 2014 to 2016. In the 2016 New Hampshire Senate election, he was a primary candidate for District 10. In 2024, he was a candidate for Cheshire County Commission, District 1.
