= Harold F. French =

American politician

Harold French

Member of the New Hampshire Senate from the 7th district
- In office December 7, 2016 – December 7, 2022
- Preceded by: Andrew Hosmer
- Succeeded by: Daniel Innis

Member of the New Hampshire House of Representatives from the Merrimack 2nd district
- In office December 3, 2014 – December 7, 2016
- Preceded by: Scott Burns
- Succeeded by: Dave Testerman

Personal details
- Born: November 5, 1955 (age 70)
- Party: Republican
- Profession: Auctioneer, real estate broker
- Website: haroldfrench.com

Harold F. French (born November 5, 1955) is an American politician and a Republican member of the New Hampshire Senate who represented the 7th district between 2016 and 2022.

French attended Plymouth State University. French was elected to the New Hampshire Senate in 2016, defeating incumbent Democrat Andrew Hosmer. From 2014 to 2016 French was a member of the New Hampshire House of Representatives.

== Electoral history ==
New Hampshire's 7th Senate District election, 2020
Party	Candidate	Votes	%
Republican	Harold French	17,801	58.32
Democratic	Philip Spagnuolo Jr.	12,907	43.68

New Hampshire's 7th Senate District election, 2018
Party	Candidate	Votes	%
Republican	Harold French	11,616	53.40
Democratic	Mason Donovan	10,141	46.60

New Hampshire's 7th Senate District election, 2016
Party	Candidate	Votes	%
Republican	Harold French	13,880	50.03
Democratic	Andrew Hosmer	13,863	49.97

New Hampshire House of Representatives 2nd Merrimack District, 2014
Party	Candidate	Votes	%
Republican	Harold French	844	50.08
Democratic	Scott Burns (Incumbent)	841	49.92

New Hampshire House of Representatives 7th Merrimack District Republican Primary, 2012
Party	Candidate	Votes	%
Republican	Susan Olsen	250	53.3
Republican	Harold French	219	46.7
