= Andy Sanborn =

American politician

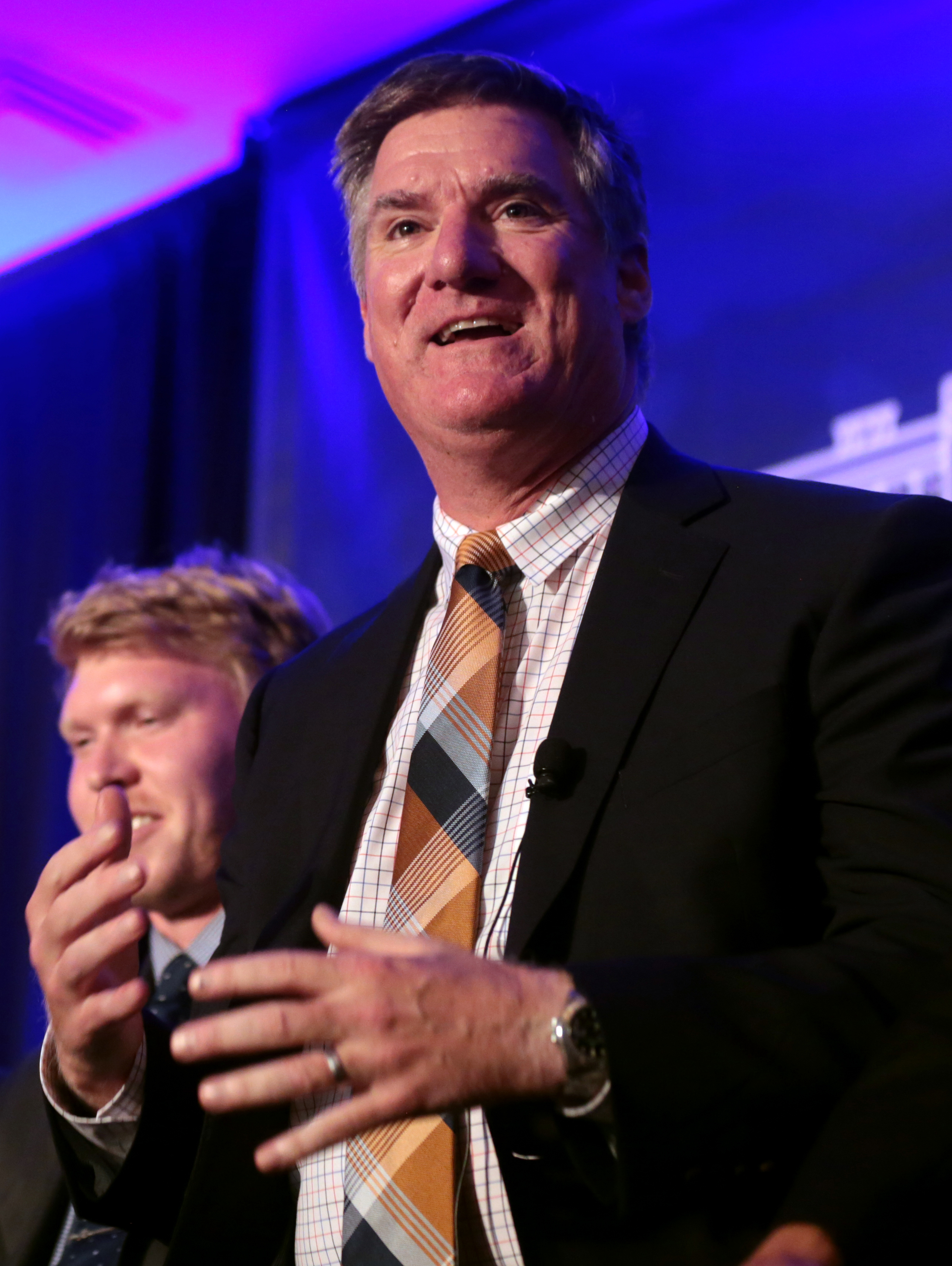

Member of the New Hampshire Senate from the 9th district
- In office December 5, 2012 – December 5, 2018
- Preceded by: Ray White
- Succeeded by: Jeanne Dietsch

Member of the New Hampshire Senate from the 7th district
- In office December 1, 2010 – December 5, 2012
- Preceded by: Harold Janeway
- Succeeded by: Andrew J. Hosmer

Personal details
- Born: Lebanon, New Hampshire
- Party: Republican
- Spouse: Laurie Sanborn
- Education: New England College

Andy Sanborn is a former Republican member of the New Hampshire Senate, representing the 9th district.

== Early life, education and career ==
Sanborn was born in Lebanon, New Hampshire. He studied marketing, finance, and economics at New England College. He worked in commercial lending for 15 years and was employed by an international leasing company in Chicago. Sanborn owns The Draft sports bar in Concord and is on the board of the New Hampshire Lodging and Restaurant Association.

Sanborn also owns and leases real estate. His tenants at Phat Stuff, a head shop in Keene, were raided by the DEA in 2014.

== Conviction ==
In August 2023, shortly after he submitted plans to build a larger casino across town in Concord, Sanborn was placed under investigation by the State of New Hampshire on allegations of covid-relief fraud due to reports that he had used relief funds to purchase luxury vehicles and personal finances. Sanborn denied these claims and his lawyers have said that the funds were used for business expenses, including the expansion of his downtown Concord casino. State officials indicated at the time of the announcement in August that they were investigating criminal charges. In October 2024 he was charged with felony theft for using $900,000 of federal COVID-19 loans and spending it on luxury cars as well as failing to mention has business was Concord Casino.

== Positions ==
Sanborn had consistently been rated one of the most conservative members of the New Hampshire State Senate. He touts himself as the "Conservative conscience" of the New Hampshire Senate. In 2017 he passed six new bills into law.

=== Marijuana legalization ===
In January 2014, Sanborn was the subject of a public controversy regarding a contentious email exchange with a constituent over the issue of marijuana legalization. An email from a constituent supporting marijuana legalization received a heated response from Sanborn, who opposes legalization, including legislation making its way through the state legislature. Sanborn wrote in the email, "I’m thinking if I call the [organization you received a scholarship from] and ask their opinion on legalization, they may have a different opinion (not to mention may be asking you for their scholarship money back…)."

The constituent was believed to be a college freshman and a recipient of a scholarship, information that Sanborn declined to say how it was obtained. Sanborn responded to the controversy thus: "My e-mail was not a suggestion that I could or would work to revoke any scholarship, only to highlight that those involved with awarding him those funds may have made a different decision had he expressed similar pro-marijuana legalization efforts to them when applying."

=== Health care ===
Sanborn is opposed to the Patient Protection and Affordable Care Act and compared it to the crash of Asiana Airlines Flight 214. He also opposed the creation of a state-run exchange under the act.

== Electoral history ==
Sanborn made an unsuccessful run for the District 7 seat in the New Hampshire Senate in 2008. He ran again in 2010, this time successfully. After redistricting, he ran in District 9, defeating Lee C. Nyquist in the 2012 general election. Sanborn considered running for governor in the 2014 elections, but announced he would no longer be seeking the Republican nomination on September 27, 2013. He was reelected in 2014 and again in 2016. In the 2016 election he was the top vote getter inside his district beating his opponent by eight points while Hillary Clinton also won the district.

New Hampshire's 9th Senate District election, 2016
| Party | Candidate | Votes | % |
|---|---|---|---|
| Republican | Andy Sanborn | 17,073 | 53.62 |
| Democratic | Lee C. Nyquist | 14,727 | 46.26 |
| Write-In | Scattered | 38 | 0.12 |

New Hampshire's 9th Senate District election, 2014
| Party | Candidate | Votes | % |
|---|---|---|---|
| Republican | Andy Sanborn | 12,310 | 53.18 |
| Democratic | Lee C. Nyquist | 10,804 | 46.68 |
| Write-In | Scattered | 32 | 0.14 |

New Hampshire's 9th Senate District election, 2012
| Party | Candidate | Votes | % |
|---|---|---|---|
| Republican | Andy Sanborn | 15,454 | 50.35 |
| Democratic | Lee C. Nyquist | 15,241 | 49.65 |

New Hampshire's 7th Senate District election, 2010
| Party | Candidate | Votes | % |
|---|---|---|---|
| Republican | Andy Sanborn | 10,816 | 54.83 |
| Democratic | Michelle L. Tremblay | 8,887 | 45.05 |
| Write-In | Scattered | 25 | 0.12 |

New Hampshire's 7th Senate District election, 2008
| Party | Candidate | Votes | % |
|---|---|---|---|
| Democratic | Harold Janeway | 14,153 | 51.93 |
| Republican | Andy Sanborn | 13,076 | 47.98 |
| Write-In | Scattered | 26 | 0.10 |

== Legislative committees ==
Sanborn was a member of the following committees:

- Ways & Means Committee (chair)
- Election Law & Internal Affairs

== Personal life ==
Sanborn is married to Laurie Sanborn, a representative for Hillsborough 41 in the New Hampshire House of Representatives. Was arrested 10/16/2024 for fraud theft by deception in connection with nearly $190,000 in pandemic aid that was paid out in 2020.

New Hampshire Senate
| Preceded by Harold Janeway | Member of the New Hampshire Senate from the 7th district 2010–2012 | Succeeded by Andrew J. Hosmer |
| Preceded by Ray White | Member of the New Hampshire Senate from the 9th district 2012–2018 | Succeeded by Jeanne Dietsch |
