= New Hampshire's 20th State Senate district =

American legislative district

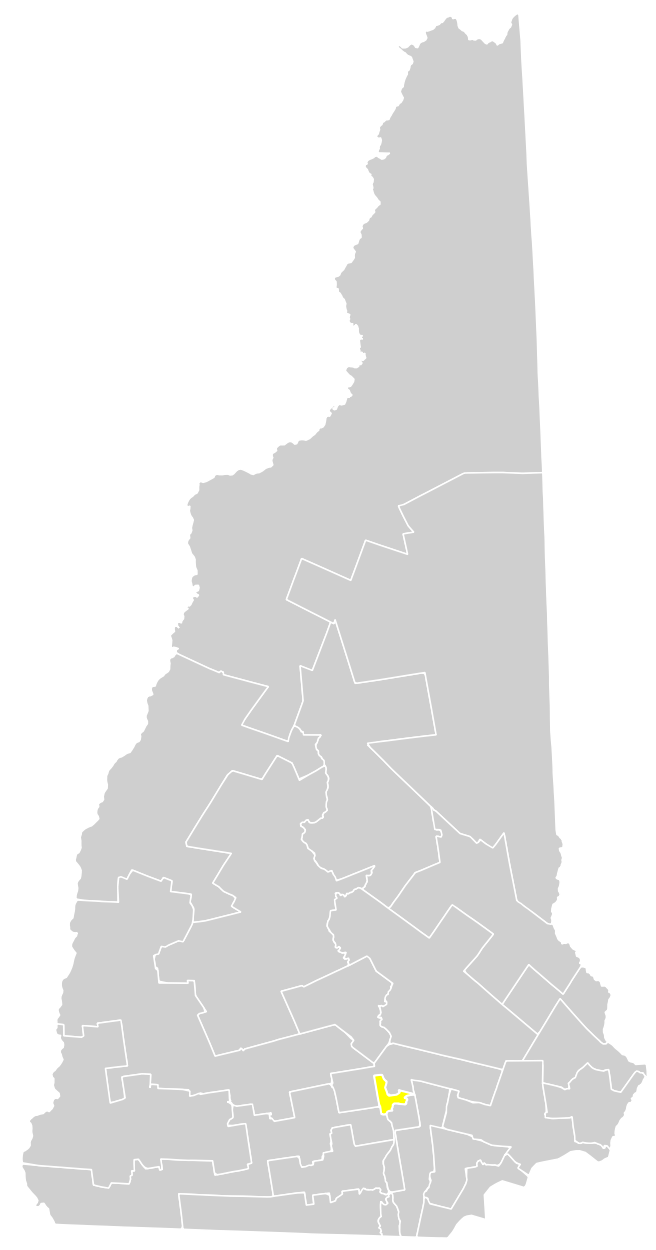
Senator
Patrick Long; D–Manchester
- Registration: 30.3% Democratic; 27.4% Republican; 42.3% No party preference
- Demographics: 74% White; 9% Black; 11% Hispanic; 5% Asian
- Population (2020): 57,841

New Hampshire's 20th State Senate district is one of 24 districts in the New Hampshire Senate. It has been represented by Democrat Patrick Long since 2024.

== Geography ==
The district is based in Manchester, including the city's 2nd, 3rd, 4th, 10th, 11th & 12th wards, in Hillsborough County. The district is located entirely within New Hampshire's 1st congressional district.

=== Federal and statewide results ===
Results are of elections held under 2022 district lines.

Year	Office	Results
2022	Senate	Hassan 60 – 40%
2022	Governor	Sununu 54 - 46%

== Recent election results ==
2024 New Hampshire State Senate election, District 20
Party	Candidate	Votes	%
Democratic	Pat Long	13,159	56.05
Republican	Brittany Ping	10,290	43.83
Write-in		27	0.12
Total votes		23,476	100.0
Democratic hold			

2022 New Hampshire State Senate election, District 20
Party	Candidate	Votes	%
Democratic	Lou D'Allesandro (incumbent)	9,859	57.9
Republican	Richard Girard	7,172	42.1
Total votes		17,031	100
Democratic hold			

== Historical election results ==
The following result occurred prior to 2022 redistricting, and thus were held under different district lines.

=== 2020 ===
2020 New Hampshire State Senate election, District 20
Primary election
Party	Candidate	Votes	%
Republican	Carla Gericke	1,785	50.2
Republican	Jack Kenny	1,759	49.4
Total votes		3,558	100
General election
Democratic	Lou D'Allesandro (incumbent)	13,548	56.4
Republican	Carla Gericke	10,479	43.6
Total votes		24,027	100
Democratic hold			

=== 2018 ===
2018 New Hampshire State Senate election, District 20
Party	Candidate	Votes	%
Democratic	Lou D'Allesandro (incumbent)	9,903	58.4
Republican	Carla Gericke	7,047	41.6
Total votes		16,950	100
Democratic hold			

=== 2016 ===
2016 New Hampshire State Senate election, District 20
Party	Candidate	Votes	%
Democratic	Lou D'Allesandro (incumbent)	13,187	60.3
Republican	Carla Gericke	8,695	39.7
Total votes		21,882	100
Democratic hold			

=== 2014 ===
2014 New Hampshire State Senate election, District 20
Party	Candidate	Votes	%
Democratic	Lou D'Allesandro (incumbent)	7,973	57.9
Republican	Eileen Landies	5,787	42.1
Total votes		13,760	100
Democratic hold			

=== 2012 ===
2012 New Hampshire State Senate election, District 20
Party	Candidate	Votes	%
Democratic	Lou D'Allesandro (incumbent)	13,264	63.1
Republican	Phil Greazzo	7,754	36.9
Total votes		21,018	100
Democratic hold			
