= Richard Brown (New Hampshire politician) =

American politician

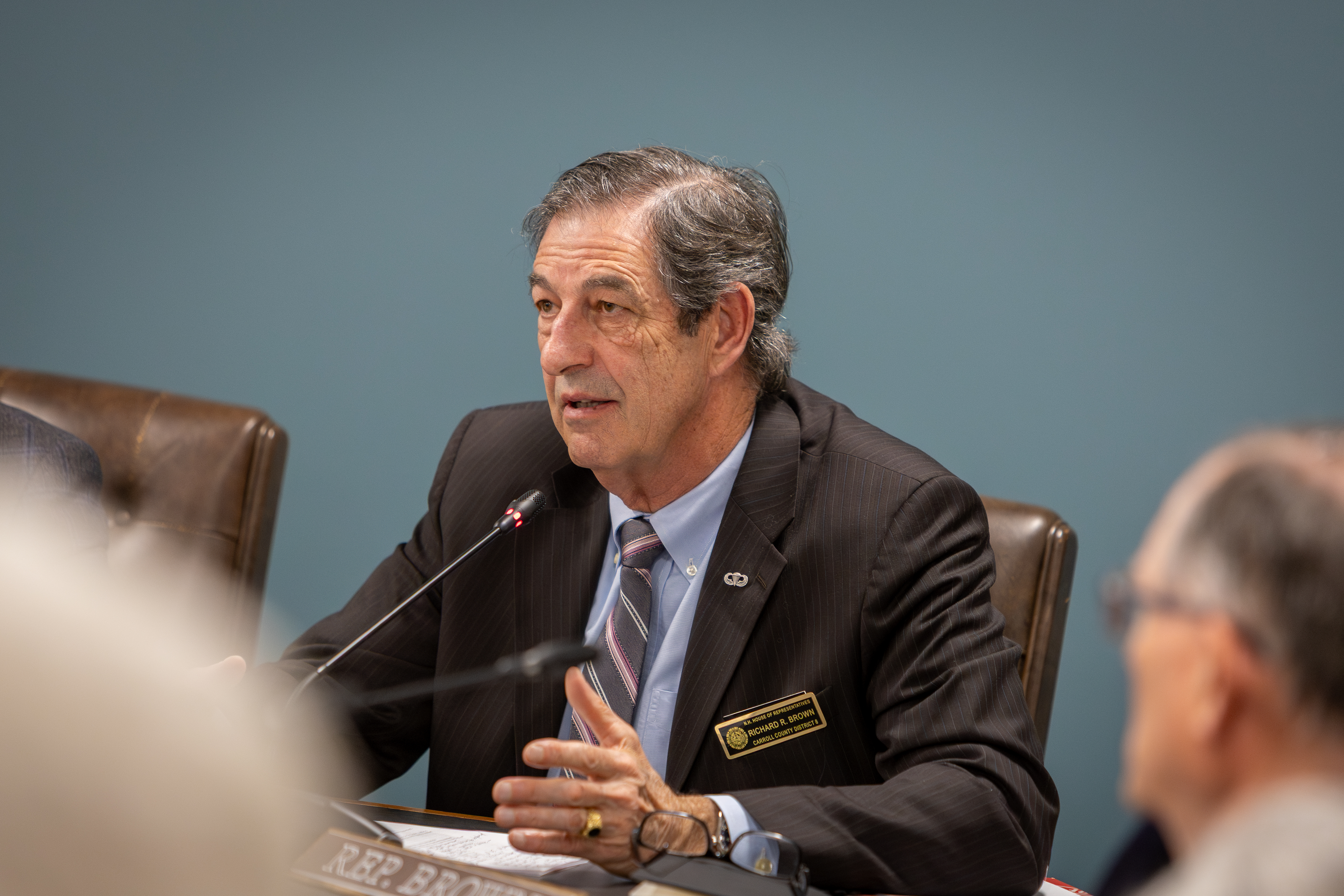
- Brown in 2026

Member of the New Hampshire House of Representatives from the Carroll 8th district
- Incumbent
- Assumed office December 4, 2024
- Preceded by: Mark McConkey
- Succeeded by: George Randell (elect)

Member of the New Hampshire House of Representatives from the Carroll 3rd district
- In office December 7, 2022 – December 4, 2024
- Preceded by: Mark McConkey
- Succeeded by: Joseph Hamblen

Personal details
- Party: Republican

Richard R. Brown is an American politician. He serves as a Republican member for the Carroll 8th district of the New Hampshire House of Representatives, previously serving as a member for the Carroll 3rd district from 2022 to 2024

He was re-elected in the 2024 New Hampshire House of Representatives election.
