= William Marsh (New Hampshire politician) =

American politician

Member of the New Hampshire House of Representatives from the 8th Carroll district
- In office December 7, 2016 – December 7, 2022
- Preceded by: Ted Wright
- Succeeded by: Mark McConkey; Michael Costable

Personal details
- Born: March 28, 1958 (age 68) Pennsylvania, U.S.
- Party: Democratic (2021–present)
- Other political affiliations: Republican (until 2021)
- Spouse: Stefanie
- Children: 5
- Education: Dartmouth College (AB, MD)

William M. Marsh (born March 28, 1958) is an American politician formerly serving as a member of the New Hampshire House of Representatives from the Carroll 8th district. He was first elected to the State House in 2016 as a Republican.

== Early life ==
Marsh was born in Pennsylvania and he graduated from Shady Side Academy in 1976. He graduated from Dartmouth College in 1979 and Dartmouth Medical School in 1982.

== Career ==
On September 14, 2021, Marsh, an ophthalmologist and the Brookfield health officer, switched parties from Republican to Democratic because his Republican colleagues had organized a rally against the Biden administration's new vaccine mandates (see COVID-19 vaccination in the United States § September 2021).

In February 2022, Marsh announced that he was going to retire from the State House in order to challenge Jeb Bradley in the New Hampshire Senate. However, he lost the general election.

Marsh ran for the State Senate again in 2024. However, he lost the general election to Mark McConkey.
