= Mark McConkey =

American politician

Member of the New Hampshire Senate from the 3rd district
- Incumbent
- Assumed office December 4, 2024
- Preceded by: Jeb Bradley

Member of the New Hampshire House of Representatives from the Carroll 8th district
- In office December 7, 2022 – December 4, 2024
- Preceded by: William Marsh
- Succeeded by: Richard R. Brown; Brian R. Taylor

Member of the New Hampshire House of Representatives from the Carroll 3rd district
- In office December 2, 2020 – December 7, 2022
- Preceded by: Susan Ticehurst
- Succeeded by: Karel Crawford; Richard R. Brown
- In office December 1, 2004 – December 5, 2018
- Preceded by: district created
- Succeeded by: Susan Ticehurst

Member of the New Hampshire House of Representatives from the Carroll 6th district
- In office December 4, 2002 – December 1, 2004
- Preceded by: Joseph Kenney
- Succeeded by: district abolished

Personal details
- Party: Republican
- Education: Springfield College

Mark E. McConkey is an American politician. He serves as a Republican member for the Carroll 8th district of the New Hampshire House of Representatives. He was elected to the New Hampshire Senate in 2024.

McConkey owns McConkey Construction, a construction business specializing in septic systems. He also owns M&V Convenience Store, a gas station and shop in Ossipee, New Hampshire.

== Political career ==
In 2025, Governor Kelly Ayotte appointed McConkey to the Commission on Government Efficiency or "COGE", a commission tasked with cutting spending by the New Hampshire government. COGE is modeled on the Department of Government Efficiency, which does similar work at the federal level.
