= Todd Milliken =

American politician

Member-elect of the New Hampshire House of Representatives from the Carroll 3rd district
- Assuming office December 2026
- Succeeding: Joseph Hamblen

Personal details
- Party: Democratic

Todd Milliken is an American politician. A member of the Democratic Party, he is the member-elect for the Carroll 3rd district of the New Hampshire House of Representatives.
