= New Hampshire's 9th State Senate district =

American legislative district

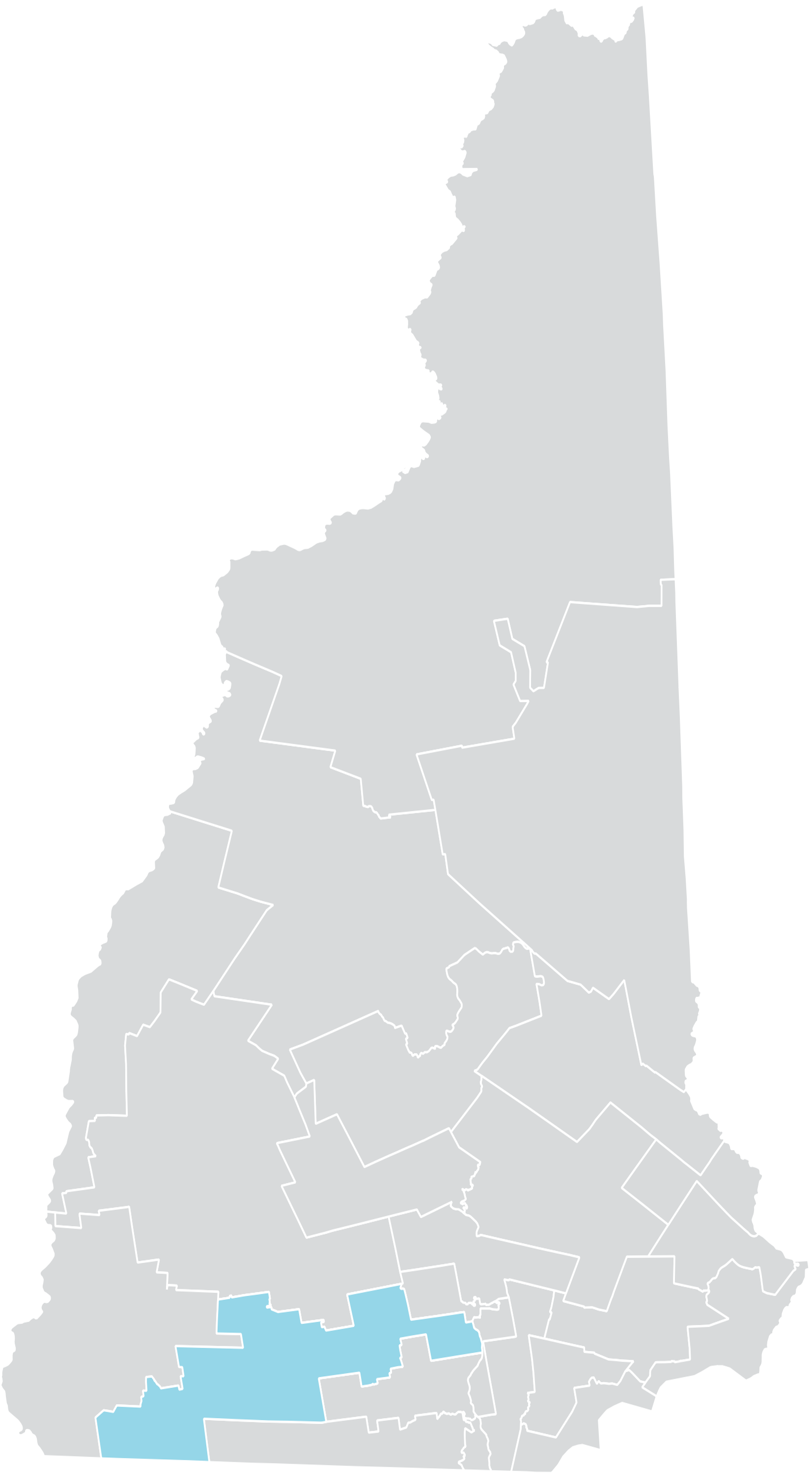
Senator
Denise Ricciardi; R–Bedford
- Registration: 34.4% Republican; 29.9% Democratic; 35.5% No party preference
- Demographics: 94.0% White; 0.4% Black; 2.2% Hispanic; 1.8% Asian
- Population (2019) • Citizens of voting age: 56,632; 43,289

New Hampshire's 9th State Senate district is one of 24 districts in the New Hampshire Senate. It has been represented by Republican Denise Ricciardi since 2020, following her defeat of incumbent Democrat Jeanne Dietsch.

== Geography ==
District 9 currently comprises the southernmost towns of Cheshire and portions of Hillsborough Counties outside of Manchester. The town list includes Bedford, Fitzwilliam, Greenfield, Hinsdale, Jaffrey, Lyndeborough, Mont Vernon, New Boston, Richmond, Sharon, Temple, Troy and Winchester.

The district includes one municipality (Bedford) from New Hampshire's 1st congressional district; every other municipality is within New Hampshire's 2nd congressional district. It borders the state of Massachusetts.

== Recent election results ==
=== 2024 ===
2024 New Hampshire State Senate election, District 9
Party	Candidate	Votes	%
Republican	Denise Ricciardi (Incumbent)	17,235	51.49
Democratic	Matthew McLaughlin	16,211	48.43
Write-in		25	0.08
Total votes		33,471	100.0
Republican hold			

=== 2022 ===
2022 New Hampshire State Senate election, District 9
Party	Candidate	Votes	%
Republican	Denise Ricciardi (incumbent)	13,687	52.2
Democratic	Matthew McLaughlin	12,510	47.7
Total votes		26,211	100.0

=== 2020 ===
2020 New Hampshire State Senate election, District 9
Party	Candidate	Votes	%
Republican	Denise Ricciardi	17,920	50.6
Democratic	Jeanne Dietsch (incumbent)	17,511	49.4
Total votes		35,431	100
Republican gain from Democratic			

=== 2018 ===
2018 New Hampshire State Senate election, District 9
Primary election
Party	Candidate	Votes	%
Democratic	Jeanne Dietsch	3,728	54.6
Democratic	Mark Fernald	2,219	32.5
Democratic	Bruce Fox	884	12.9
Total votes		6,831	100
Republican	Dan Hynes	2,699	53.1
Republican	Terry Wolf	2,382	46.9
Total votes		5,081	100
General election
Democratic	Jeanne Dietsch	14,037	52.4
Republican	Dan Hynes	12,776	47.6
Total votes		26,813	100
Democratic gain from Republican			

=== 2016 ===
2016 New Hampshire State Senate election, District 9
Primary election
Party	Candidate	Votes	%
Democratic	Lee Nyquist	2,105	51.0
Democratic	Jeanne Dietsch	2,026	49.0
Total votes		4,131	100
General election
Republican	Andy Sanborn (incumbent)	17,073	53.7
Democratic	Lee Nyquist	14,727	46.3
Total votes		31,800	100
Republican hold			

=== 2014 ===
2014 New Hampshire State Senate election, District 9
Party	Candidate	Votes	%
Republican	Andy Sanborn (incumbent)	12,310	53.3
Democratic	Lee Nyquist	10,804	46.7
Total votes		23,114	100
Republican hold			

=== 2012 ===
2012 New Hampshire State Senate election, District 9
Primary election
Party	Candidate	Votes	%
Republican	Andy Sanborn	3,732	61.1
Republican	Ken Hawkins	1,738	28.5
Republican	Michael Kenney	634	10.4
Total votes		6,104	100
General election
Republican	Andy Sanborn	15,454	50.3
Democratic	Lee Nyquist	15,241	49.7
Total votes		30,695	100
Republican hold			

=== Federal and statewide results ===
Year	Office	Results
2020	President	Biden 53.6 – 44.8%
2020	Senate	Shaheen 56.3 – 41.8%
2016	President	Clinton 47.8 – 46.8%
2014	Senate	Brown 51.6 – 48.4%
2014	Governor	Havenstein 51.5 – 48.5%
2012	President	Romney 51.1 – 47.7%
2012	Governor	Hassan 49.9 – 48.1%
