= Joe Duarte (politician) =

American politician

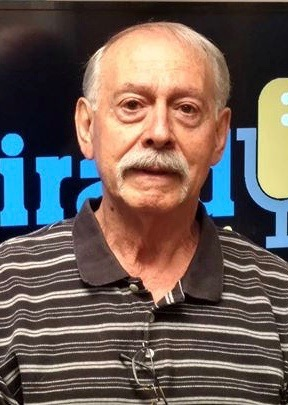

Member of the New Hampshire House of Representatives from the Rockingham 2nd district
- In office January 2011 – January 2017
- Preceded by: Maureen Mann
- Succeeded by: Jim Nasser

Personal details
- Born: November 29, 1941 (age 84) Viana do Castelo, Portugal
- Party: Republican

Joe Duarte (born November 29, 1941) is a former Republican member of the New Hampshire House of Representatives, from Candia. Duarte was born in Viana do Castelo, Portugal. He unsuccessfully ran for the New Hampshire Senate in the 2016 elections. Duarte has nine grandchildren.

For the 2016 United States presidential election, Duarte endorsed Republican nominee Donald Trump.
