= Alan Bershtein =

American politician

Member of New Hampshire House of Representatives for Rockingham 2
- In office December 5, 2018 – December 7, 2022
- Preceded by: Jim Nasser

Personal details
- Party: Republican

Alan Bershtein is an American politician. He was a member of the New Hampshire House of Representatives and represented Rockingham 2nd district.
