= George Randell (politician) =

American politician

Member-elect of the New Hampshire House of Representatives from the Carroll 8th district
- Assuming office December 2026
- Succeeding: Richard Brown

Personal details
- Party: Democratic

George Randell is an American politician. A member of the Democratic Party, he is the member-elect for the Carroll 8th district of the New Hampshire House of Representatives.
