= Joseph Hamblen =

American politician

Member of the New Hampshire House of Representatives from the Carroll 3rd district
- Incumbent
- Assumed office December 4, 2024
- Preceded by: Richard Brown
- Succeeded by: Todd Milliken (elect)

Personal details
- Party: Republican

Joseph Hamblen is an American politician. He serves as a Republican member for the Carroll 3rd district of the New Hampshire House of Representatives.
