= Susan Ticehurst =

American politician

Member of the New Hampshire House of Representatives from the Carroll 3rd district
- In office December 5, 2018 – December 2, 2020
- Preceded by: Mark McConkey
- Succeeded by: Mark McConkey
- In office December 5, 2012 – December 7, 2016
- Succeeded by: Jerry Knirk

Personal details
- Party: Democratic

Susan Ticehurst is a New Hampshire politician.

== Career ==
Ticehurst served in one of the New Hampshire House of Representatives seats representing the Carroll 3 district from December 5, 2012, to December 7, 2016. She lost the general election on November 8, 2016. On November 6, 2018, Ticehurst was again elected to the New Hampshire House of Representatives where she represents the Carroll 3 district. She assumed office on December 5, 2018. She is a Democrat.

== Personal life ==
Ticehurst resides in Tamworth, New Hampshire.
