= New Hampshire's 7th State Senate district =

American legislative district

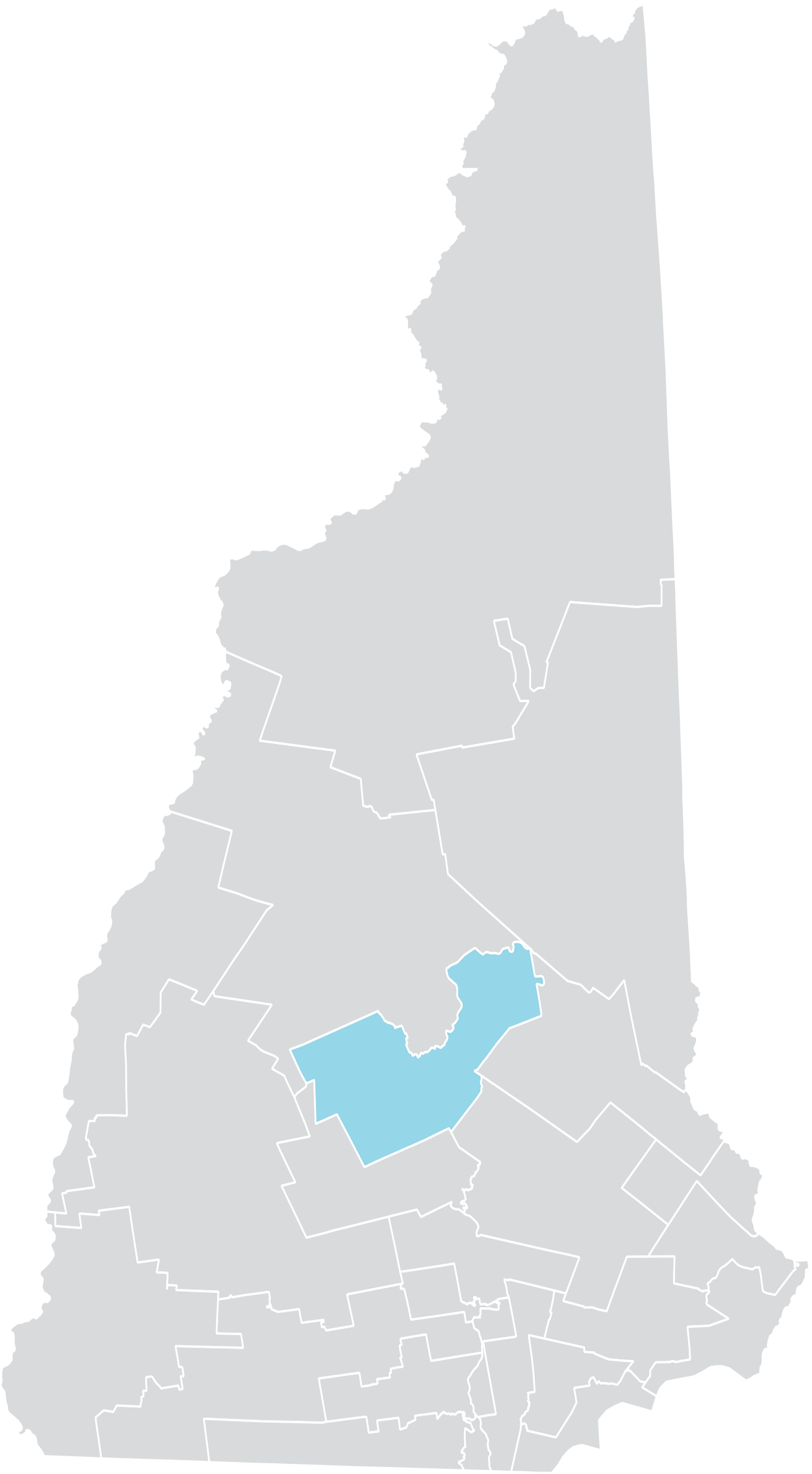
Senator
Daniel Innis; R–Bradford
- Registration: 33.6% Republican; 25.0% Democratic; 41.4% No party preference
- Demographics: 95.5% White; 0.6% Black; 1.8% Hispanic; 1.0% Asian
- Population (2019) • Citizens of voting age: 56,790; 45,068

New Hampshire's 7th State Senate district is one of 24 districts in the New Hampshire Senate. It has been represented by Republican Daniel Innis since 2022.

== Geography ==
District 7 currently comprises portions of Grafton, Merrimack Counties and a single town each in Belknap, Hillsborough and Sullivan. The district includes the towns of Alexandria, Andover, Bradford, Bridgewater, Bristol, Boscawen, Danbury, Franklin, Goshen, Grafton, Hebron, Henniker, Hill, Hillsboro, Orange, Salisbury, Sutton, Warner, Webster and Wilmot.

The district is located entirely within New Hampshire's 2nd congressional district.

== Recent election results ==
=== 2024 ===
2024 New Hampshire State Senate election, District 7
Party	Candidate	Votes	%
Republican	Daniel Innis (Incumbent)	17,888	55.48
Democratic	Stu Green	14,337	44.47
Write-in		17	0.05
Total votes		32,242	100.0
Republican hold			

=== 2022 ===
2022 New Hampshire State Senate election, District 7
Primary election
Party	Candidate	Votes	%
Republican	Daniel Innis	3,509	63.2
Republican	Thomas Dunne Jr.	2,044	36.8
Total votes		5,553	100
General election
Republican	Daniel Innis	13,413	54.6
Democratic	Richard Lobban	11,146	45.4
Total votes		24,559	100
Republican hold			

Elections prior to 2022 were held under different district lines.

== Historical election results ==
=== 2020 ===
2020 New Hampshire State Senate election, District 7
Party	Candidate	Votes	%
Republican	Harold French (incumbent)	17,801	58.0
Democratic	Philip Spagnuolo Jr.	12,907	42.0
Total votes		30,708	100
Republican hold			

=== 2018 ===
2018 New Hampshire State Senate election, District 7
Party	Candidate	Votes	%
Republican	Harold French (incumbent)	11,616	53.4
Democratic	Mason Donovan	10,141	46.6
Total votes		21,757	100
Republican hold			

=== 2016 ===
2016 New Hampshire State Senate election, District 7
Party	Candidate	Votes	%
Republican	Harold French	13,880	50.03
Democratic	Andrew Hosmer (incumbent)	13,863	49.97
Total votes		27,743	100
Republican gain from Democratic			

=== 2014 ===
2014 New Hampshire State Senate election, District 7
Party	Candidate	Votes	%
Democratic	Andrew Hosmer (incumbent)	9,578	50.3
Republican	Kathleen Lauer-Rago	9,423	49.5
Total votes		19,025	100
Democratic hold			

=== 2012 ===
2012 New Hampshire State Senate election, District 7
Primary election
Party	Candidate	Votes	%
Republican	Joshua Youssef	2,752	53.2
Republican	William Grimm	2,422	46.8
Total votes		5,174	100
General election
Democratic	Andrew Hosmer	15,573	59.1
Republican	Joshua Youssef	10,768	40.9
Total votes		26,341	100
Democratic hold			

=== Federal and statewide results ===
Year	Office	Results
2020	President	Trump 52.7 – 45.7%
2016	President	Trump 53.8 – 41.2%
2014	Senate	Shaheen 51.4 – 48.6%
2014	Governor	Hassan 51.4 – 48.6%
2012	President	Obama 51.7 – 47.2%
2012	Governor	Hassan 54.5 – 42.7%
