= Andrew Hosmer =

American politician

City Manager of Lebanon, New Hampshire
- Incumbent
- Assumed office 2025

Mayor of Laconia, New Hampshire
- In office January 2020 – August 2025
- Preceded by: Edward J. Engler

Member of the New Hampshire Senate from the 7th district
- In office December 5, 2012 – December 7, 2016
- Preceded by: Andy Sanborn
- Succeeded by: Harold French

Personal details
- Born: March 1964 (age 62)
- Party: Democratic
- Occupation: Businessman

Andrew Hosmer (born March 1964) is an attorney, businessman and Democratic politician who previously served as the mayor of Laconia, New Hampshire, United States. He previously served two terms (2012-2016) in the New Hampshire Senate representing Senate District 7. In the Senate, Hosmer served on the Commerce, Ways & Means, and Finance Committees. In his final Senate term (2015-2016), he was the Democratic Caucus Leader. Hosmer is also the general manager of AutoServ, his family's automotive business and is the father of four children.
