= Jim Nasser =

American politician

Member of New Hampshire House of Representatives for Rockingham 2
- In office 2016 – December 5, 2018
- Succeeded by: Alan Bershtein

Personal details
- Party: Republican

Jim Nasser is an American politician. He was a member of the New Hampshire House of Representatives and represented Rockingham 2nd district.
