= Shawn Mickelonis =

American politician

Member of the New Hampshire House of Representatives from the Strafford 1st district
- In office 2006–2008

Personal details
- Party: Democratic; Republican

Shawn Mickelonis is a former Democratic member of the New Hampshire House of Representatives, representing the Strafford 1st District from 2006 to 2008. He failed to win re-election in November 2008.
