= Kenneth C. Dahlberg =

American businessman

Kenneth C. Dahlberg is an American engineer and corporate executive. Dahlberg was CEO, chairman of the board, and president of Science Applications International Corporation (SAIC). He became CEO on November 3, 2003 and chairman of the board on July 16, 2004.

Dahlberg majored in electrical engineering at Drexel University and the University of Southern California, where he received his bachelor's and master's degrees in 1967 and 1969, respectively.

In 1967 he started his career with Hughes Aircraft, where he held various engineering, program management and leadership positions and served successively as president of three different corporate divisions. After Raytheon acquired Hughes in 1997, he became president and chief operating officer of Raytheon Systems Company. In 2000, he became executive vice president for business development and president of Raytheon International.

Before joining SAIC, he was a vice president at General Dynamics.

On June 23, 2009, Dahlberg announced that he would step down as CEO of SAIC on September 20, 2009. His departure is in accordance with SAIC's mandatory retirement policy for executives. He said that he would remain Chairman of the Board until June 2010. It was announced that Walter P. Havenstein would succeed Dahlberg as CEO. Havenstein was formerly CEO of BAE Systems.

In July 2011, Motorola Solutions Inc. announced that Kenneth C. Dahlberg has been elected to its board of directors.
