= Jeanne Dietsch =

American politician and technology entrepreneur (born 1952)

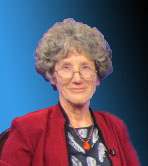

Member of the New Hampshire Senate from the 9th district
- In office December 6, 2018 – December 2, 2020
- Preceded by: Andy Sanborn
- Succeeded by: Denise Ricciardi

Personal details
- Born: April 16, 1952 (age 74) Kenton, Ohio, U.S.
- Party: Democratic
- Spouse: Bill Kennedy
- Children: 2
- Education: Western Michigan University (BS)

Jeanne Dietsch (born April 16, 1952) is an American former politician and businesswoman who served as a Democratic member of the New Hampshire Senate, representing the 9th district from 2018 to 2020.

== Early life and career ==
Dietsch was born in Kenton, Ohio, and grew up in Marion, Ohio.

Before entering politics, Dietsch worked in the technology sector and later became involved in a local sub-committee in Peterborough, NH. Dietsch co-founded a robotics company and conducting internet market research, including early articles pertaining to e-commerce.

== Government service ==
Dietsch unsuccessfully ran for State Senate in New Hampshire in 2016, losing in the primary to Lee Nyquist.

In 2018, Dietsch won 54% of votes in the Democratic primary. She later won the general election against Republican Dan Hynes, 14,037 to 12,776. Dietsch served as Vice Chair of the Senate Education and Workforce Development Committee and Chair of the Commission on the Environmental and Health Impacts of Perfluorinated Chemicals.

=== Political positions ===
Dietsch has been a proponent of an income tax. In 2019, Dietsch was the sponsor for a last minute amendment, to an unrelated bill dealing with using cell phones while driving, which would have added a 6.2% payroll tax.

In June 2020, Dietsch was quoted on comments made at a House Education Committee Meeting while debating a bill on school choice, where she stated “this idea of parental choice, that’s great if the parent is well-educated. There are some families that’s perfect for. But to make it available to everyone? No. I think you’re asking for a huge amount of trouble.”

Dietsch's bill to establish Telecommunications Districts, in order to ease rural broadband expansion, became law in 2020.
