= Jerry Knirk =

American politician

Member of the New Hampshire House of Representatives from the Carroll 3rd district
- In office December 7, 2016 – December 7, 2022
- Preceded by: Susan Ticehurst

Personal details
- Party: Democratic
- Education: Michigan State University (BA); Harvard Medical School (MD)

Jerry Knirk is a New Hampshire physician and politician who served in the New Hampshire House of Representatives.
