= Patrick Long (New Hampshire state senator) =

American politician

Member of the New Hampshire Senate from the 20th district
- Incumbent
- Assumed office December 4, 2024
- Preceded by: Lou D'Allesandro

Member of the Manchester Board of Aldermen from Ward 3
- In office January 7, 2020 – January 6, 2026
- Preceded by: Tim Baines
- Succeeded by: Dana Dexter
- In office January 5, 2010 – January 2, 2018
- Preceded by: Peter M. Sullivan
- Succeeded by: Tim Baines

Member of the New Hampshire House of Representatives from Hillsborough County
- In office December 7, 2022 – December 4, 2024
- Constituency: Hillsborough 23rd
- In office December 3, 2014 – December 7, 2022
- Constituency: Hillsborough 10th
- In office December 5, 2012 – December 3, 2014
- Constituency: Hillsborough 42nd
- In office December 6, 2006 – December 5, 2012
- Constituency: Hillsborough 10th

Personal details
- Born: September 20, 1955 (age 70) Manchester, New Hampshire, U.S.
- Party: Democratic
- Spouse: Karen Long

Patrick Long (born September 20, 1955 (Note: The Patch article dated to October 2017 mentioned he was 62 at the time and the second reference has his birthday on September 20, which puts his birth year in 1955.)) is an American politician who has served in the New Hampshire State Senate since 2024, representing the 20th district. A member of the Democratic Party, Long previously served in the New Hampshire House of Representatives from 2006 to 2024 and two stints on the Manchester Board of Aldermen from 2010 to 2018 and from 2020 to 2026.

== Early life, education, and career ==
Long was born and raised in the West Side of Manchester, New Hampshire. At age 3, Long and his family lost access to subsidized housing and experienced homelessness. As a result, Long and his brother Mickey were brought to St. Peter's Orphanage via Catholic Charities USA, whereas his mother was placed in Goffstown's Hillsborough County Farm (Note: The county farm was the site of the New Hampshire State Prison for Women until 2018.) and allowed to visit the children on Sundays. His mother regained custody of the siblings when he was 16 years old. Long attended Manchester High School West, where he earned his GED.

After high school, Long joined an apprenticeship with the Ironworkers Union Local 7. He rose through the union's ranks, ultimately serving as the business manager for 13 years.

== Political career ==
Long served in the New Hampshire House of Representatives from 2006 to 2024, representing Manchester-based districts. He represented Hillsborough's 10th district from 2006 to 2012 and from 2014 to 2022, Hillsborough's 42nd district from 2012 to 2014, and Hillsborough's 23rd district from 2022 to 2024. Long served as vice chair of the Children and Family Law Committee from 2022 to 2024.

Long also served two stints the Manchester Board of Mayor and Alderman, the first from 2010 to 2018 and the second from 2020 to 2026. Long lost re-election in 2017 by six votes but was re-elected in 2019. Throughout his time as an alderman, he represented Ward 3, which includes downtown Manchester. He served as an aldermanic liaison to the Manchester Planning Board and the Manchester Heritage Commission. In July 2025, Long declined to seek re-election for his aldermanic term, citing the time constraints posed by the workload of serving as both alderman and state senator.

Long was elected to the New Hampshire State Senate in 2024, succeeding long-time state senator Lou D'Allesandro. He represents the 20th district, which is based in Manchester. Long is not related to the other Patrick Long, a Democratic state representative from Manchester who shares the same name.

In the 2020 presidential election, Long endorsed Elizabeth Warren for president. In the 2024 presidential primary, Long endorsed the write-in Joe Biden campaign.

== Personal life ==
Long lives in the West Side of Manchester. He is married to Karen, who assists with operating her family's business in Auburn, New Hampshire. He has a child and grandson who reside in California.
