= USS Gendreau =

Buckley-class destroyer escort in the United States Navy

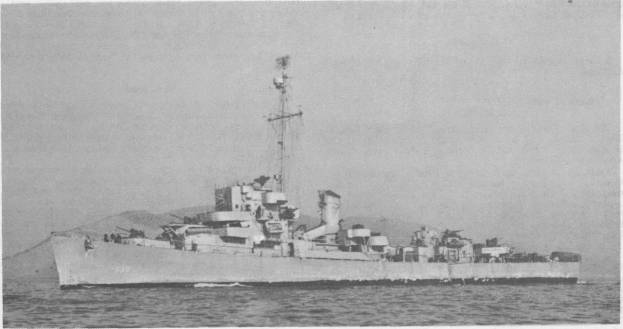
- Gendreau (DE-639) as part of the Pacific Reserve Fleet at San Diego, California in 1959.

History
- Name: USS Gendreau
- Namesake: Elphege Alfred Mailliot Gendreau
- Ordered: 1942
- Builder: Bethlehem Shipbuilding Corporation, San Francisco
- Laid down: 1 August 1943
- Launched: 12 December 1943
- Commissioned: 17 March 1944
- Decommissioned: 13 March 1948
- Stricken: 1 December 1972
- Fate: Sold for scrap, 11 September 1973

General characteristics
- Class & type: Buckley-class destroyer escort
- Displacement: 1,400 long tons (1,422 t) standard; 1,740 long tons (1,768 t) full load
- Length: 306 ft (93 m)
- Beam: 37 ft (11 m)
- Draft: 9 ft 6 in (2.90 m) standard; 11 ft 3 in (3.43 m) full load
- Propulsion: 2 × boilers; General Electric turbo-electric drive; 12,000 shp (8.9 MW); 2 × solid manganese-bronze 3,600 lb (1,600 kg) 3-bladed propellers, 8 ft 6 in (2.59 m) diameter, 7 ft 7 in (2.31 m) pitch; 2 × rudders; 359 tons fuel oil
- Speed: 23 knots (43 km/h; 26 mph)
- Range: 3,700 nautical miles at 15 knots; (6,900 km at 28 km/h; 17 mph); 6,000 nmi at 12 knots; (11,000 km at 22 km/h; 14 mph)
- Complement: 15 officers, 198 men
- Armament: 3 × 3"/50 caliber guns; 1 × quad 1.1"/75 caliber gun; 8 × single 20 mm guns; 1 × triple 21-inch (533 mm) torpedo tubes; 1 × Hedgehog anti-submarine mortar; 8 × K-gun depth charge projectors; 2 × depth charge tracks

USS Gendreau (DE-639) was a Buckley-class destroyer escort in the United States Navy. She was commissioned on 17 March 1944 and decommissioned on 13 March 1948. She served throughout the Pacific during World War II.

== Namesake ==
Elphege Alfred Mailliot Gendreau was born on 29 June 1888 in Canada. He was commissioned Assistant Surgeon, Medical Reserve Corps, with the rank of Lieutenant (junior grade) on 20 August 1915. He served on USS Glacier in Mexican waters during political unrest in that country and on USS Charleston during World War I.

After service in a number of assignments afloat and ashore, he was commissioned Captain on 20 September 1939. During the years 1940 and 1941, he served as Force Surgeon of Battle Force and subsequently on the staff of Admiral Chester W. Nimitz, Commander in Chief, Pacific Fleet. In the summer of 1943, he was on temporary duty in the South Pacific inspecting medical facilities to improve treatment and care of battle casualties. He voluntarily embarked in USS LST-343 to assist in the evacuation of the sick and wounded from Rendova. He was killed in a dive-bombing attack on the LST-343 on 21 July 1943. His dedicated service prompted Admiral Nimitz to recommend that a destroyer be named for him.

== Construction and commissioning ==
Gendreau was laid down on 1 August 1943 by Bethlehem Shipbuilding Co., San Francisco; launched on 12 December 1943, sponsored by Mrs. Josephine Gendreau, widow of Captain E. A. M. Gendreau, with Mrs. Chester W. Nimitz, wife of the Commander in Chief of Pacific Fleet, as matron of honor. Gendreau was commissioned on 17 March 1944.

== Service history ==
=== Convoy escort ===
After shakedown off the California coast, Gendreau departed San Francisco, California, on 23 May 1944 escorting a convoy to Pearl Harbor, arriving six days later. She trained in Hawaiian waters and got underway on 18 June 1944 on the first of two voyages, escorting convoys between Hawaii and the Marshalls. Convoy duty brought her to Eniwetok again and on 26 July 1944. Gendreau returned to Oahu from the second voyage in time to help welcome President Franklin D. Roosevelt to Hawaii. During an ensuing anti-submarine patrol out of Pearl Harbor, the destroyer escort rescued the pilot and crew of an aircraft which had ditched at sea on 31 July 1944; and nine days later in heavy seas saved a downed fighter pilot.

Gendreau departed Pearl Harbor on 8 September 1944, with a convoy for Emirau. On 13 September 1944, she collided with escort carrier Breton (CVE-23) while fueling from her in heavy seas; but efficient emergency repairs allowed Gendreau to proceed with the convoy to Emirau before steaming into Manus on 19 September 1944 for repairs. She sailed from the Admiralties on 1 October 1944 and arrived at Port Purvis on Florida Island, in the Solomons, on 4 October 1944. Following intensive training with PT boats at Tulagi, she sailed on 27 October 1944 for the Russell Islands and rendezvoused with a convoy of landing craft bound for New Georgia Island. Departing on 29 October 1944, the group proceeded to Cape Torokina, Bougainville, where the landing craft debarked troops. Gendreau escorted the landing craft back to the Russells on 1 November 1944, and returned to Port Purvis the next day.

From 17 February through 20 February 1945, Gendreau was in dry dock, being repaired by its seamen and members of the repair ship Tutuila (ARG-4). Lieutenant Martin Victor became captain of Gendreau at this time.

In March 1945, following three months of escort and ASW duty shuttling between islands of the South Pacific, Gendreau rehearsed for the coming Okinawa invasion after which she escorted landing craft to the Russell Islands and Port Purvis, arriving at Port Purvis on 7 March 1945, and returning to the Russells four days later. Underway from the Russells on 12 March 1945, she called at Ulithi on 21 March 1945 for final staging and sortied four days later with a task force for the Ryukyus.

=== Invasion of Okinawa ===
On L-Day, 1 April 1945, Gendreau was off the southeast coast of Okinawa protecting amphibious ships. Before dawn a Japanese plane attacked the DE but was shot down and crashed a few yards to starboard. A few hours later she closed the invasion beaches and delivered the landing craft to their assigned positions well in advance of the final bombardment and initial landings. The next day she was in the destroyer screen when another enemy plane attacked her at dawn, but with the aid of other ships she managed to shoot it down. On 3 April 1945, a plane strafed her and then, on its second pass, tried to crash her, but Gendreau's gunfire blew it out of the air and the plane crashed 25 yards (23 m) away. On 5 April 1945 she joined a hunter-killer group.

On 6 April 1945, a torpedo bomber aimed a torpedo at the DE, but it exploded upon hitting the water. Gendreau shot down the bomber 500 yards (500 m) astern. The following day she destroyed another attacking plane. On 12 April 1945, without warning, a torpedo bomber roared in and released a torpedo which passed just under the bow and exploded some distance beyond. On 16 April 1945, two enemy planes homed in on her, but two American fighters swooped in from behind and shot down the attackers.

Gendreau departed Okinawa on 22 April 1945 with a convoy, touching at Saipan five days later and returning to Okinawa on 2 May 1945. She departed the next day for Ulithi, arriving there on 7 May 1945. Underway again on 23 May 1945 with a mixed convoy, she called at Okinawa on 29 May 1945 and escorted convoys in these waters. On 10 June 1945, while supporting the American troops who were wresting the island from Japan, Gendreau was hit by shellfire from a hidden 150 mm (5.9 in) gun. She lost power and began taking water, but outstanding damage control had her under control in 15 minutes and nearly restored her to normal within two hours. Two men were killed and two others wounded.

=== East China Sea ===
After repairs at Kerama Retto and later at Buckner Bay, Okinawa, she joined Vice Admiral Jesse B. Oldendorf's Task Force on 13 July 1945, for training and minesweeping in the East China Sea. On 26 July 1945 she rescued a friendly fighter pilot who had ditched at sea, picking him up only 32 minutes after the crash. At the end of the month a bad typhoon caused her to roll nearly 60° and buckled steel plating. On 31 July 1945 she escorted damaged battleship Pennsylvania (BB-38) to Guam and returned to Okinawa on 12 September 1945, where four days later, another typhoon parted her port anchor chain. She departed on 22 September 1945 to act as courier ship during the Allied occupation of the Japanese homeland.

Thus, after a short but distinguished war career, Gendreau stood out of Tokyo Bay on 4 November 1945 bound home via Pearl Harbor, arriving at Portland, Oregon on 22 November 1945. Around this time, the departing captain of Gendreau, Lieutenant Commander Martin Victor, gave the following farewell address to the crew:

For the men of Gendreau, returning to peaceful ways of life, the past years will fade into memory, but this story will recall valued shipmates and a life strange and uncongenial to many of us, that of the seafaring man. In regarding it in future years, let us consider the cost of failure to live in peace with the world and, in that light, judge the politicians of the day. We may take pride that we were among those who, with our own hands, defended the country in battle, but let us not for that reason ask privileges as civilians. We shall remember the sometimes irksome but always vital role of military leadership, discipline and planning, all directed toward the objective of defeating the enemy.

Now, as citizens, remember the obligation to question, consider and examine both ideas and men, realizing that the objective itself is not always clear. Beware of popular leaders of the moment, being careful not to follow blindly, but to think and act in the interest of the country. Your recent life in the Pacific with its boredom, dangers and absences from the United States will drive home what it means to be an American.

=== Post-war activities ===
In February 1946 she proceeded to San Diego for training exercises and then departed the following month on a Far Eastern cruise. Gendreau arrived at Shanghai, China, on 14 April 1946, and sailed to Huludao, Manchuria, and then to Qingdao and Qinghuangdao, China. Further patrols brought her to Okinawa and Shanghai again May to June, and on 1 July 1946 she headed for California, arriving at San Diego on 19 July 1946. After training and repairs, she cast off on her last Far Eastern cruise, calling at Pearl Harbor and Guam en route to Japan.

Gendreau arrived in Japan on 19 March 1947. In the spring and summer of 1947, Gendreau stood patrol duty off the Korean coast, calling at Yokosuka, Japan on 21 May 1947, and thence returning to station. On 1 September 1947, she sailed from Japan for Pearl Harbor and San Diego, putting in at the latter port 19 September 1947.

=== Decommissioning and sale ===
Gendreau decommissioned on 13 March 1948 and entered the Pacific Reserve Fleet at San Diego. Gendreau was stricken on 1 December 1972. Gendreau was sold on 11 September 1973 and broken up for scrap.
