= Denise Ricciardi =

American politician (born 1961)

Member of the New Hampshire Senate from the 9th district
- Incumbent
- Assumed office December 2, 2020
- Preceded by: Jeanne Dietsch
- Succeeded by: Matthew McLaughlin (elect)

Personal details
- Born: Denise Crusade; December 16, 1961 (age 64) Philadelphia, Pennsylvania, U.S.
- Party: Republican
- Spouse: Giorgio
- Education: Sam Houston State University

Denise Crusade Ricciardi (born December 16, 1961) is an American politician from New Hampshire. A Republican, she has represented the 9th district of the New Hampshire Senate since 2020, defeating Democratic incumbent Jeanne Dietsch. Ricciardi served on the Bedford town council from 2019 to 2022, and was its vice chair from 2019 to 2021.

In 2024, she received the 2024 Water Advocate Award from the Granite State Rural Water Association.
