= Kenneth A. Dahlberg =

American political scientist

Kenneth Arthur Dahlberg (August 31, 1935 – May 1, 2023) was an American political scientist. He was a professor at Western Michigan University from 1966 to 2001, and led the environmental studies program there from 1998 until his retirement in 2001.

== Biography ==
Dahlberg was born in Denver, Colorado in 1935, and graduated from East High School in 1953. He obtained a BA in mathematics from Northwestern University in 1957, and then served in the United States Army for two years, working in intelligence and stationed in Germany. He obtained an MA from Stanford University in political science in 1961. He completed his PhD in political science at University of Colorado in 1966, after spending time in Belgium as a Fulbright scholar. He joined the political science faulty of Western Michigan University in 1966.

== Awards and honors ==
- 1981 Harold & Margaret Sprout Award for his book "Beyond the Green Revolution"
- 1982 Elected AAAS Fellow
- 1991 Distinguished Faculty Scholar Award, WMU
