= Ben Ming =

American politician

Member of the New Hampshire House of Representatives from the Hillsborough 35th district
- Incumbent
- Assumed office December 7, 2022

Personal details
- Party: Democratic
- Education: George Washington University (BS); Harvard University (ALM); Suffolk Law School (JD)

Ben Ming is an American politician. He serves as a Democratic member for the Hillsborough 35th district of the New Hampshire House of Representatives, comprising the town of Hollis. Ming is the first Chinese American elected to the New Hampshire General Court.
