= Brian S. Gallagher =

American politician

Member of New Hampshire House of Representatives for Belknap 4
- In office 2014–2016

Personal details
- Party: Republican

Brian S. Gallagher is an American politician. He was a member of the New Hampshire House of Representatives and represented Belknap 4th district from 2014 to 2016.

Gallagher is from Sanbornton, New Hampshire. In the 2016 New Hampshire Senate election, he was a candidate for District 2. In 2018 he was a candidate for county commissioner.
