= Lou D'Allesandro =

American politician (born 1938)

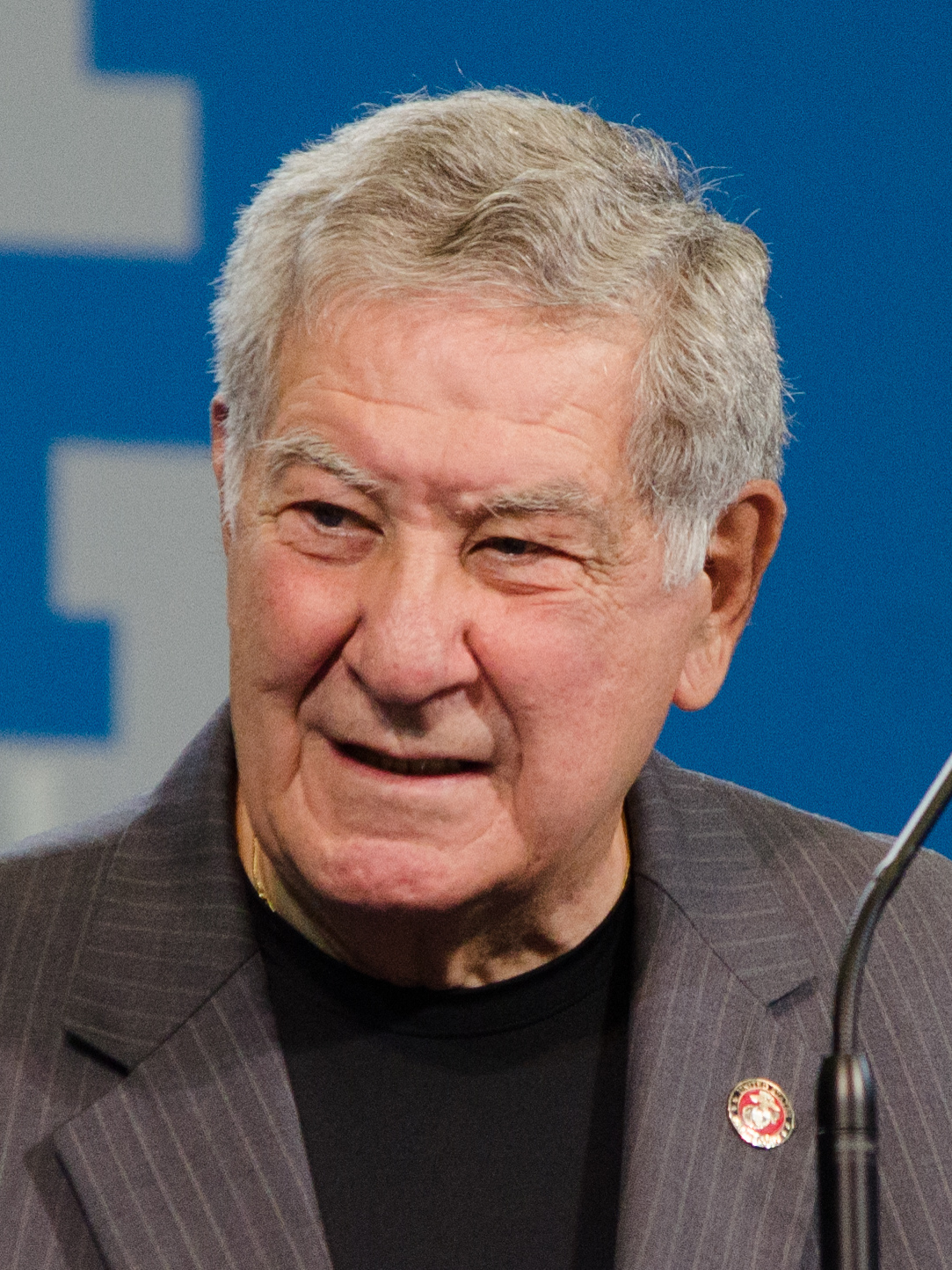
- D'Allesandro in 2016

Member of the New Hampshire Senate from the 20th district
- In office December 2, 1998 – December 4, 2024
- Preceded by: Richard Danais
- Succeeded by: Patrick Long

Member of the New Hampshire House of Representatives from the 46th Hillsborough district
- In office December 4, 1996 – December 2, 1998 Serving with Irene M. Messier, Frank J. Reidy
- Preceded by: John M. White
- Succeeded by: John M. White

Member of the New Hampshire Executive Council from the 4th district
- In office 1975–1981
- Preceded by: John F. Bridges
- Succeeded by: Louis J. Georgopoulos

Member of the New Hampshire House of Representatives from the 34th Hillsborough district
- In office December 6, 1972 – December 4, 1974 Serving with James A. Sweeney, Doris T. Lynch, Robert H. Gillmore
- Preceded by: Multi-member district
- Succeeded by: Gerard H. Belanger

Personal details
- Born: July 30, 1938 (age 88) Boston, Massachusetts, U.S.
- Party: Democratic
- Spouse: Patricia
- Education: University of New Hampshire
- Profession: Retired college administrator and basketball coach

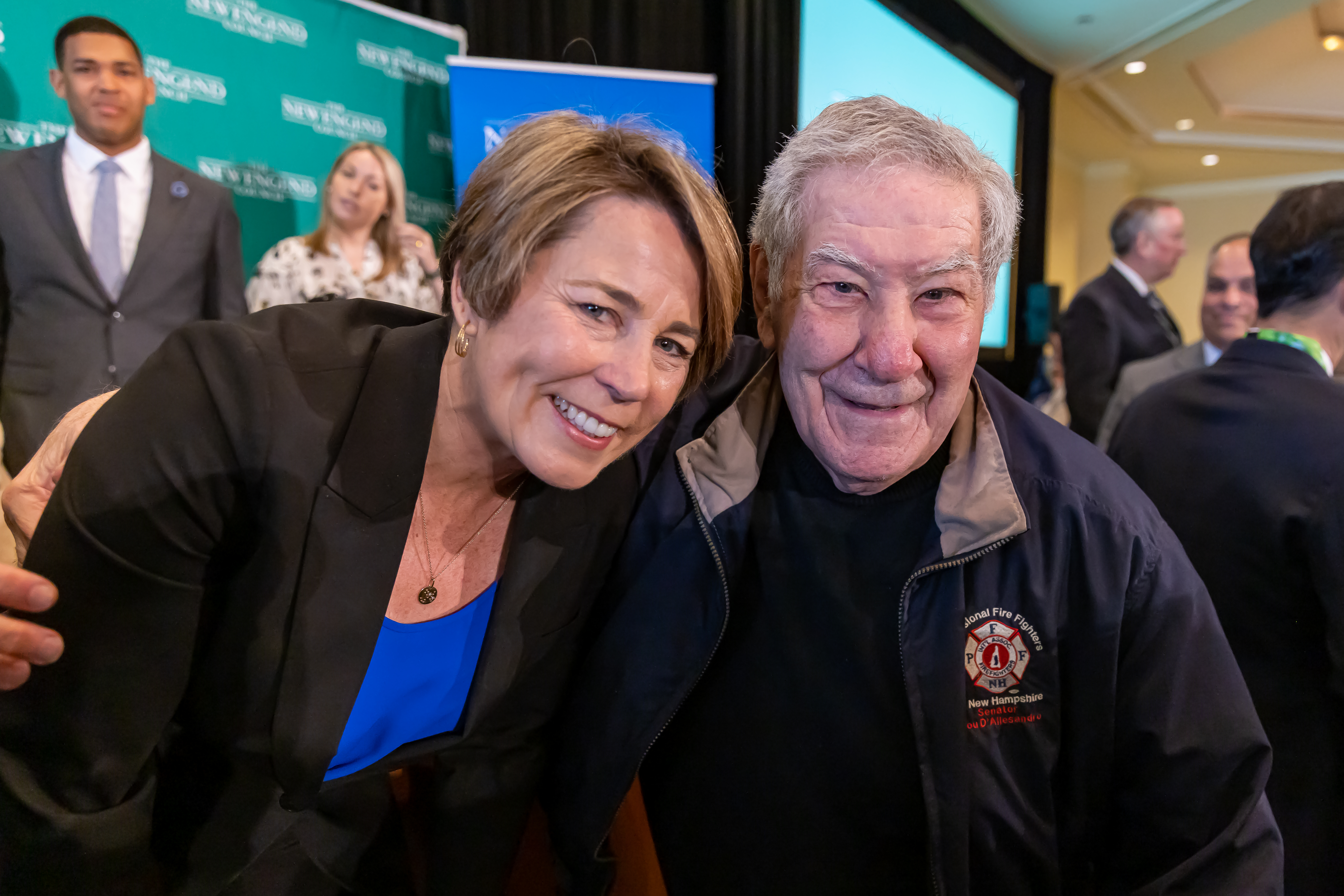
D'Allesandro with Governor Maura Healey at a breakfast hosted by the New England Council in 2023

Lou D'Allesandro (born July 30, 1938) is a former Democratic member of the New Hampshire Senate, representing the 20th district from 1998 to 2024. D'Allesandro served as chair of Senate Finance and vice chair of the Ways & Means and Capital Budget committees. Previously he was a member of the New Hampshire Executive Council from 1975 to 1981 and the New Hampshire House of Representatives from 1996 through 1998 and from 1972 to 1974. D'Allesandro appears frequently on the Paul Westcott Show on WGIR (AM) and WQSO.

A 1956 graduate of Worcester Academy and of the University of New Hampshire (UNH) in 1961, D'Allesandro was a three-year letterman on the football team, and served as the team's co-captain during his senior season in 1960–61. He was also a two-year member of the lacrosse team and played one year of baseball for the Wildcats. While at UNH, he was a member of the Phi Kappa Theta fraternity. He was inducted into the UNH Hall of Fame on September 25, 2010.

In 1963, D'Allesandro became the first athletic director and men's basketball coach at Southern New Hampshire University (known then as New Hampshire College), where he was instrumental in helping the school achieve NCAA status. As head coach, the men's basketball team won three consecutive conference titles from 1964–65 to 1966–67. He was inducted into the SNHU Penmen Hall of Fame in 1970.

A biography of D'Allesandro, Lou D'Allesandro: Lion of the New Hampshire Senate and Thoughts for Presidential Hopefuls, by Mark C. Bodanza, was published in 2018.

D'Allesandro has been most recently linked to his pro-Columbus Day campaign, stating that he felt it is a holiday for Italian-Americans that fought persecution in the 18th century, and should not be changed to Indigenous People's Day, which New Hampshire's governor Sununu confirmed with House Bill 1014 signed on September 10, 2024.

== Early life ==
D'Allessandro was born and raised in East Boston. At three years old, a house fire occurred in his family's tenement, and he was saved by the Boston Fire Department.
