= Philip Spagnuolo Jr. =

American politician (1967 – 2021)

Member of the New Hampshire House of Representatives from the Belknap 3rd district
- In office March 2018 – December 4, 2018

Personal details
- Born: August 30, 1967 Wakefield, Massachusetts, U.S.
- Died: June 22, 2021 (aged 53)
- Party: Democratic
- Education: New Hampshire College

Philip Spagnuolo Jr. (August 30, 1967 – June 22, 2021) was an American politician. He served as a Democratic member for the Belknap 3rd district of the New Hampshire House of Representatives.

== Life and career ==
Spagnuolo was born in Wakefield, Massachusetts. He attended Laconia High School, Wakefield High School and New Hampshire College.

Spagnuolo served in the New Hampshire House of Representatives in 2018.

Spagnuolo died on June 22, 2021, at the age of 53.
