= Regina Birdsell =

American politician

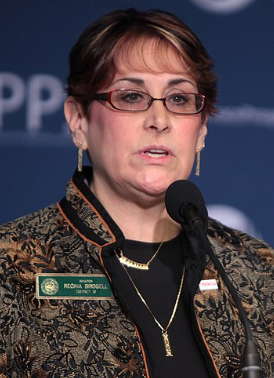

Majority Leader of the New Hampshire Senate
- Incumbent
- Assumed office December 4, 2024
- Preceded by: Sharon Carson

Member of the New Hampshire Senate from the 19th district
- Incumbent
- Assumed office December 3, 2014
- Preceded by: James Rausch

Member of the New Hampshire House of Representatives
- In office December 5, 2012 – December 3, 2014
- Constituency: Rockingham 13th
- In office December 1, 2010 – December 5, 2012
- Constituency: Rockingham 8th

Personal details
- Born: March 4, 1956 (age 70)
- Party: Republican
- Education: Merrimack College (BA)

Regina Birdsell (born Mar 4, 1956) is an American politician who has served in the New Hampshire Senate from the 19th district since 2014. She served in the New Hampshire House of Representatives from 2010 to 2014.

She lives in Hampstead, New Hampshire and earned a bachelor's degree in management from Merrimack College

New Hampshire Senate
Preceded by Sharon Carson	Majority Leader of the New Hampshire Senate; 2024–present	Incumbent
