= Walt Havenstein =

American businessman, engineer, and naval veteran

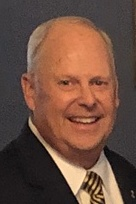

Personal details
- Born: Walter Perry Havenstein; April 24, 1949 (age 77)
- Party: Republican
- Education: United States Naval Academy (BS); Naval Postgraduate School (MS)

Military service
- Allegiance: United States
- Branch/service: United States Marine Corps
- Years of service: 1971–1983(Active); 1984–1999(Reserve)
- Rank: Colonel

Walter Perry Havenstein (born April 24, 1949) is an American businessman, engineer, and former United States Marine. He was the Republican nominee for Governor of New Hampshire in 2014.

== Early life and education ==
Havenstein is the son of Kathryn McKay (Creech) and Paul Lieder Havenstein, CDR, USN. He graduated from the United States Naval Academy with a bachelor's degree in aerospace engineering and received a master's degree in electrical engineering from the Naval Postgraduate School. Havenstein served in the US Marine Corps on active duty from 1971 to 1983.

== Career ==
=== Early career ===
Havenstein began his career in the defense industry at ITT Corporation's Aerospace and Communications Division. Havenstein has held executive roles at Raytheon, including vice president and general manager of the Strategic Systems Division, director of business development for the Communications Manufacturing Division, vice president and general manager of the Surveillance and Control Division, and vice president for Tactical Data Systems.

Havenstein joined BAE Systems in 2000 when the company purchased Lockheed Martin Aerospace Electronic Systems, including its Sanders subsidiary of which he was president. Aerospace Electronic Systems was renamed BAE Systems Information and Electronic Systems Integration, and Havenstein was named president. From 2003 to 2005 Havenstein was executive vice president for BAE Systems North America. In a major reorganization in 2005, BAE Systems North America was renamed BAE Systems Inc., and BAE Systems Information and Electronic Systems Integration was merged into the newly created BAE Systems Electronics and Integrated Solutions. Havenstein became president of this new operating group. As of June 26, 2009, Havenstein resigned as director and chief operating officer of BAE Systems plc and president and CEO of its subsidiary BAE Systems Inc after spending two years at the helm.

Havenstein replaced John Abele as Chairman of the Board of FIRST in 2010.

=== Science Applications International Corporation ===
Effective September 21, 2009, Havenstein succeeded Ken Dahlberg as the CEO of Science Applications International Corporation, a company with over $10 billion in revenue. During Havenstein's tenure as CEO of SAIC, the company was investigated by the United States Attorney in the Southern District of New York for corporate fraud, wire fraud, and tax evasion arising from its administration of its CityTime contract with the City of New York. The case was settled under a deferred prosecution agreement. SAIC paid a $500 million forfeiture to the federal government. The company agreed to independent monitoring to ensure that systemic management problems which enabled the fraud remained in place. Havenstein retired from SAIC for personal reasons shortly after the prosecution of SAIC was deferred. He recently told the Keene Sentinel editorial board that he left his million dollar a year job because the commute from New Hampshire to Washington, DC had become too difficult. As SAIC's CEO, Havenstein was selected to receive the Technology "Good Scout Award" at the annual luncheon on October 19, 2010.

=== Campaign for governor ===
On April 16, 2014, Havenstein announced that he was running for Governor of New Hampshire as a Republican. Immediately upon entering the race, Havenstein faced questions from opponents about his eligibility to run.

RSA 655:5 of New Hampshire law states that, "To hold the office of governor, a person must be qualified as provided in Part 2, Article 42 of the state constitution: at the time of the election, the person must have been an inhabitant of this state for 7 years next preceding, and be of the age of 30 years." Resident and inhabitant is defined in RSA 21:6 as someone "who has, through all of his actions, demonstrated a current intent to designate that place of abode as his principal place of physical presence for the indefinite future to the exclusion of all others".

Havenstein responded to residency questions on April 16. The Concord Monitor reported him saying, "New Hampshire has been his domicile since 1999 and he has not voted in any other state during that time period. He said he is confident that he has met all of his tax obligations in Maryland and elsewhere, but said he would not release his tax information when asked by a reporter."

He won the Republican primary on September 9 and later lost to incumbent Gov. Maggie Hassan (D) in the general election on November 4, 2014.

== Honors and awards ==
In December 2009, Havenstein was honored and recognized as a recipient of the Spirit of Service Award given by the Youth Leadership Foundation, which provides academic tutoring and mentoring to disadvantaged youth in the Washington, DC metro area.

Party political offices
| Preceded by Ovide Lamontagne | Republican nominee for Governor of New Hampshire; 2014 | Succeeded by Chris Sununu |
