= Jeb Bradley =

American politician (born 1952)

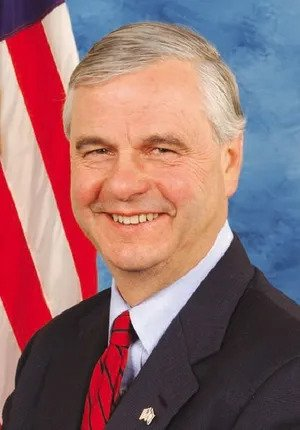

President of the New Hampshire Senate
- In office December 7, 2022 – December 4, 2024
- Preceded by: Chuck Morse
- Succeeded by: Sharon Carson

Majority Leader of the New Hampshire Senate
- In office December 2, 2020 – December 7, 2022
- Preceded by: Dan Feltes
- Succeeded by: Sharon Carson
- In office December 1, 2010 – December 5, 2018
- Preceded by: Maggie Hassan
- Succeeded by: Dan Feltes

Member of the New Hampshire Senate from the 3rd district
- In office April 21, 2009 – December 4, 2024
- Preceded by: Bill Denley
- Succeeded by: Mark McConkey

Member of the U.S. House of Representatives from New Hampshire's 1st district
- In office January 3, 2003 – January 3, 2007
- Preceded by: John Sununu
- Succeeded by: Carol Shea-Porter

Member of the New Hampshire House of Representatives from the 8th Carroll district
- In office December 2, 1992 – December 4, 2002
- Preceded by: Constituency established
- Succeeded by: Lisbeth Olimpio; Bettie Kenney

Member of the New Hampshire House of Representatives from the 6th Carroll district
- In office December 5, 1990 – December 2, 1992 Serving with Mildred Beach
- Preceded by: Russell Chase; Kenneth MacDonald
- Succeeded by: Gordon Wiggin

Personal details
- Born: Joseph Edmund Bradley III; October 20, 1952 (age 74) Rumford, Maine, U.S.
- Party: Democratic (before 1989); Republican (1989–present)
- Spouse(s): Barbara Bradley (divorced) Karen McNiff (m. 2018)
- Education: Tufts University (BA)

Joseph Edmund "Jeb" Bradley III (born October 20, 1952) is an American politician and member of the Republican Party who served in New Hampshire’s State Senate from 2009 to 2024. He was a member of the New Hampshire House of Representatives from 1990 to 2002, and then served as the U.S. representative for New Hampshire's 1st congressional district from 2003 to 2007. He was the Majority Leader of the New Hampshire Senate from 2010 to 2018 and again from 2020 to 2022.

== Early life and education ==
Bradley was born in Rumford, Maine, to Helen Jockers Bradley and Joseph Edmund Bradley, Jr. After graduating from Governor Dummer Academy, he attended Tufts University, graduating in 1974 with a Bachelor of Arts with a major in sociology.

== Career ==
Bradley lived in Switzerland and worked as a street magician, returning in 1981 to New Hampshire, where he later opened an organic grocery called Evergrain Natural Foods. He and his wife sold the natural foods store in 1997. He also ran a painting business, and managed real estate.

Bradley was elected to the Wolfeboro Planning Board in 1986; three years later, he was named to the Budget Committee. He was a registered Democrat until 1989, when he switched to the Republican party.

Bradley won a seat in the New Hampshire House of Representatives in November 1990 and was re-elected five times. In the legislature, he sponsored the Clean Power Act, which set limits on power plant emissions. He was chairman of the Science, Technology and Energy Committee, as well as the Joint Committee on Ethics.

== U.S. House of Representatives ==
=== Elections ===
2002

Bradley was first elected to Congress in 2002, winning the Republican nomination in a field of eight candidates, for the seat left vacant when Republican incumbent John E. Sununu ran for the Senate. He defeated Democrat Martha Fuller Clark in the general election, winning with 58 percent of the vote.

2004

In 2004, Bradley defeated political newcomer Justin Nadeau of Portsmouth to win a second term, receiving 63% of the vote. Bradley outspent Nadeau 3 to 1.

Bradley's chief of staff, Debra J. Vanderbeek, ran his 2004 campaign. Tom Anfinson, the financial administrator in Bradley's government office, said that Vanderbeek was paid 100 percent of her salary until the end of May 2004, 80 percent between June and September, and 50 percent between October and early November. Bradley's re-election committee paid her $13,561 in salary for the campaign, which she failed to report as outside income to the Clerk of the House, plus $3,317 in reimbursements for un-itemized campaign expenses.

2006

Bradley sought a third term in 2006. He defeated Michael Callis in the Republican primary on September 12, 2006, winning 87% of the vote. Bradley faced Democrat Carol Shea-Porter and Libertarian party candidate Dan Belforti in the November 2006 general election. In what was considered an upset, Bradley lost his bid for re-election to Shea-Porter.

Bradley and Shea-Porter met October 24 for a debate sponsored by WMUR-TV and the New Hampshire Union Leader, and debated again on October 31.

2008

In January 2007, Bradley announced his intention to reclaim his former seat. He said he'd made up his mind a few days after his loss. He lost the general election to incumbent Carol Shea-Porter, 52%–46%.

=== Tenure ===
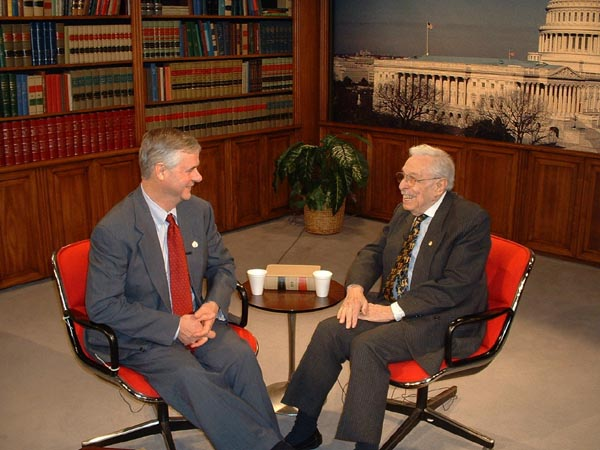
Bradley appearing on Ask Congress with Lester Wolff

Members of the media, colleagues and opponents described Bradley as a moderate in the Republican Party when he was elected in 2002. He sided with his party by supporting the war in Iraq, the reauthorization of the USA Patriot Act, the prohibition of federal funding of overseas abortion, the $5 billion subsidy for the Chinese nuclear program. However, he opposed President Bush's energy bill and supported the Medicare Part D prescription drug subsidy. He has cosponsored bills to loosen regulations on embryonic stem cell research.

Bradley served on the Armed Services, Budget, Veterans' Affairs and Small Business committees.

Bradley has belonged to Christine Todd Whitman's It's My Party Too!, The Republican Main Street Partnership, The Republican Majority For Choice, Republicans For Choice and Republicans for Environmental Protection.

Bradley voted in favor of the 2006 "Same Sex Marriage Resolution", which would have amended the Constitution, requiring that marriage "shall consist only of the union of a man and a woman."

Bradley opposed an increase in the national minimum wage during his time in Congress.

Bradley, who has visited Iraq three times, has been a supporter of the Iraq War. In January 2006 he said "It is not possible to predict exactly when stability in Iraq will occur, but the progress is significant." In June 2006 he said that he did not support a specific timetable for withdrawing American troops from the country, but that he saw signs of progress that the United States would be able to leave "sooner rather than later". In August 2006 he said that Iraq needed a stable government and more security forces before the United States could set a withdrawal date. In October 2006 he said "I look at the fact that Iraq has become central to the war on terror", and "We have got to achieve stability in Iraq and prevent it from becoming a launching pad for terrorists."

He lost his seat in 2006 to an outspokenly antiwar candidate, Carol Shea-Porter. That year (and in 2008), the Democrats swept the state legislature and both U.S. House seats.

== State Senate ==
=== Elections ===
2009

A few weeks into the new legislative session, Bradley's local State Senator, Bill Denley, resigned the seat after being charged with drunk driving for the third time. Bradley won a special election over Willard "Bud" Martin, who had lost to Denley in 2008.

2010

Bradley successfully ran for re-election as a State Senator during the 2010 election cycle. He was unopposed in the September 14 Republican state primary, and faced Democratic candidate Beverly Woods in the November 2 general election.

=== Tenure ===
After the elections, in which the Republican party regained the majority in the State Senate, Bradley was appointed Senate Majority Leader.

Bradley's former Congressional aide, Frank Guinta (also a former mayor of Manchester and former state representative), ran as a Republican for Bradley's old Congressional seat. Bradley did not endorse his former aide in the primary. In mid-August 2010, a month before the primary, Bradley stated that Guinta should consider dropping out of the race if he was unable to explain some possible irregularities in his campaign finance reports. Guinta did not drop out of the race and was elected to Congress.

Bradley has been categorized as anti-choice by NH Choice Tracker, which notes that he "voted to pass a bill that repeals the right of reproductive centers to create protest-free 'buffer zones' outside their clinics," a bill which would greatly impede the ability of members of the public to access reproductive care. He also supported the controversial Education Freedom Account program, which since 2021 has funneled nearly $45 million of public funds toward private schools with no oversight.

In 2024 Bradley fought to radically amend the Senate’s version of HB1163, which would have legalized cannabis and regulated it similarly to alcohol, though he later voted against it anyway. His and others’ edits to the bill were widely blamed for the bill’s ultimate failure in the House, a vote which was decried by ACLU Executive Director Devon Chaffee as a sign “that lawmakers are willing to ignore the will of their own constituents and are okay with continuing to needlessly ensnare over a thousand people – disproportionately Black people – in New Hampshire’s criminal justice system every year.” Ahead of the Senate vote on the bill, Bradley admitted, “I don’t want to see it get out of the Senate, period.”

== Personal life ==
Bradley lives in Wolfeboro. He and his former wife Barbara have four children: Jan, Ramona, Urs and Sebastian. An avid hiker, Bradley has ascended all of New Hampshire's 48 4,000-foot peaks and is a member of the Appalachian Mountain Club's Four Thousand Footer Club. Bradley has completed the GRID which is when every 4,000-foot peak in New Hampshire is ascended in every month of the year. He completed the GRID on Mount Madison on January 14, 2015.

Bradley has a portfolio of stocks and bonds worth over $5 million. In October 2006, he said that putting his personal investments in a blind trust may be a "good idea", and that he was going to look into that option. The point became moot in January 2007, when he became a private citizen again.

Bradley remarried in 2018.

== Electoral history ==
| Year | Office | Election | Subject | Party | Votes | % | Opponent | Party | Votes | % | Opponent | Party | Votes | % |
|---|---|---|---|---|---|---|---|---|---|---|---|---|---|---|
| 2002 | Congress, District 1 | General | Jeb Bradley | Republican | 128,993 | 58 | Martha Fuller Clark | Democratic | 85,426 | 38 | Dan Belforti | Libertarian | 7387 | 3 |
| 2004 | Congress, District 1 | General | Jeb Bradley | Republican | 204,836 | 63 | Justin Nadeau | Democratic | 118,226 | 37 | | | | |
| 2006 | Congress, District 1 | General | Jeb Bradley | Republican | 95,538 | 49 | Carol Shea-Porter | Democratic | 100,837 | 51 | | | | |
| 2008 | Congress, District 1 | General | Jeb Bradley | Republican | 156,338 | 46 | Carol Shea-Porter | Democratic | 176,435 | 52 | Bob Kinsbury | Libertarian | 8100 | 2 |

U.S. House of Representatives
| Preceded by John Sununu | Member of the U.S. House of Representatives from New Hampshire's 1st congressional district 2003–2007 | Succeeded by Carol Shea-Porter |
New Hampshire Senate
| Preceded by Maggie Hassan | Majority Leader of the New Hampshire Senate; 2010–2018 | Succeeded by Dan Feltes |
| Preceded by Dan Feltes | Majority Leader of the New Hampshire Senate; 2020–2022 | Succeeded by Sharon Carson |
Political offices
| Preceded by Chuck Morse | President of the New Hampshire Senate; 2022–2024 | Succeeded by Sharon Carson |
U.S. order of precedence (ceremonial)
| Preceded by Richard N. Swett as Former US Representative | Order of precedence of the United States as Former US Representative | Succeeded by Paul Hodes as Former US Representative |
