= 2016 New Hampshire Republican presidential primary =

- February 9, 2016

23 pledged delegates to the 2016 Republican National Convention
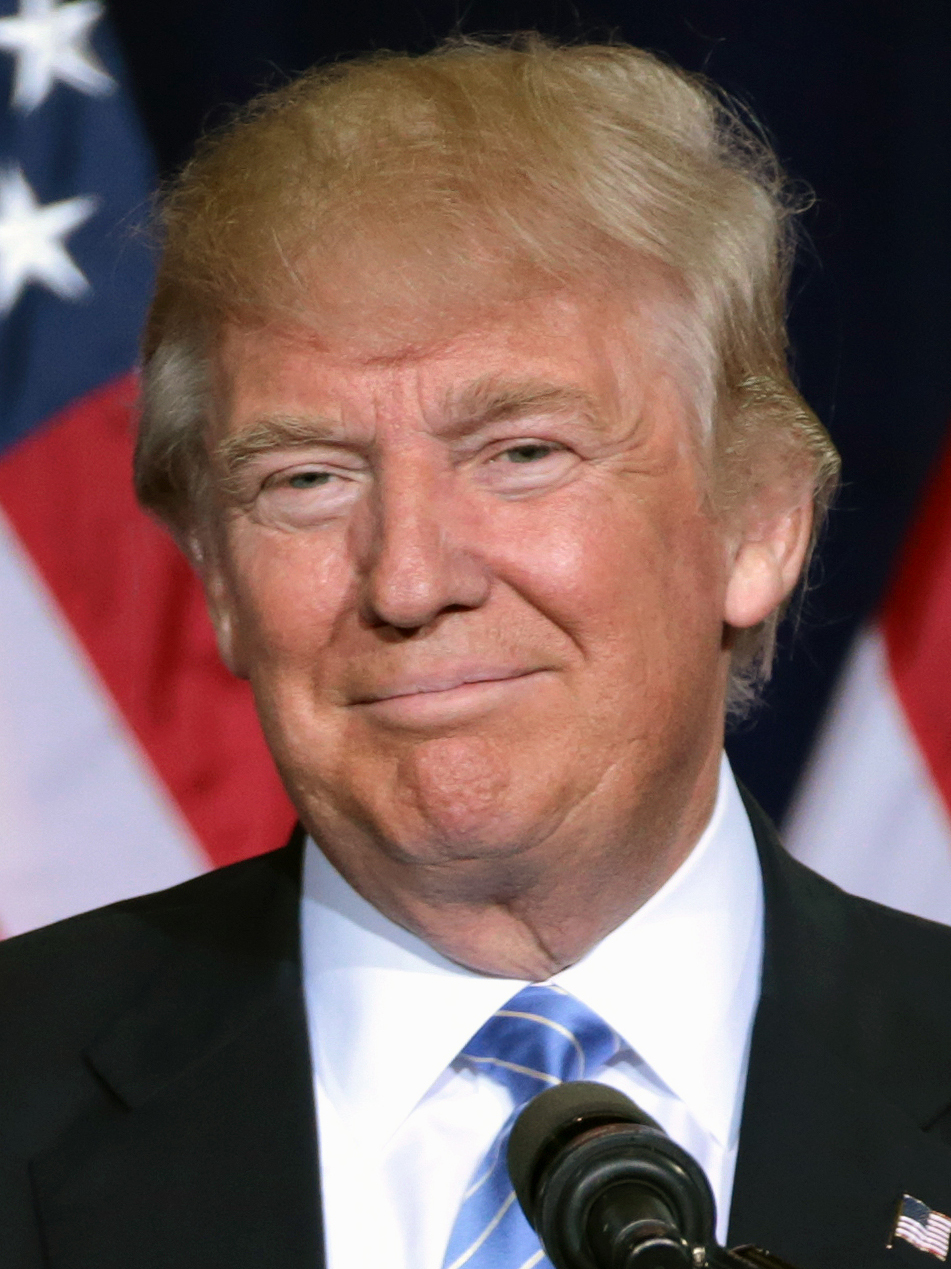

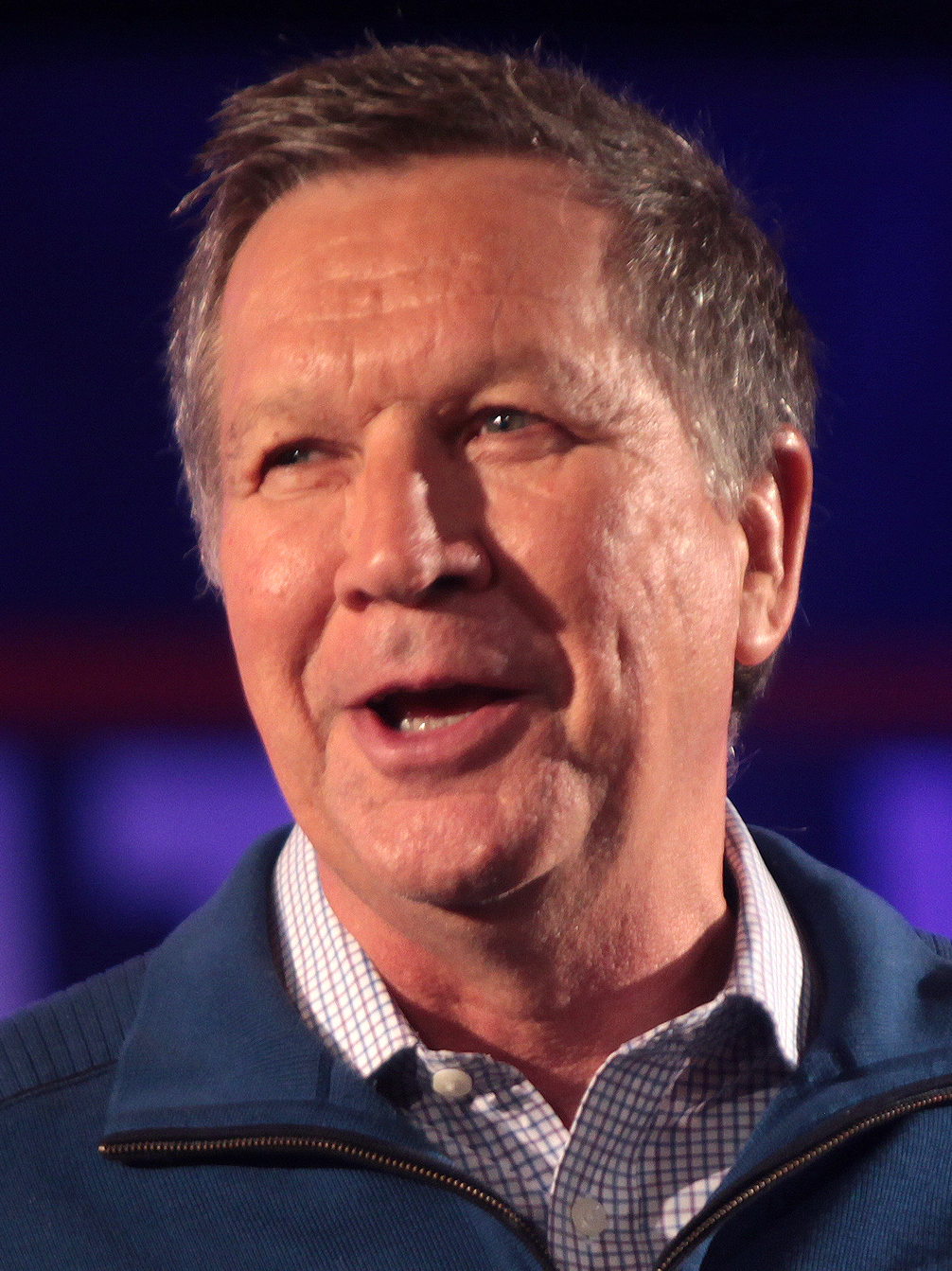

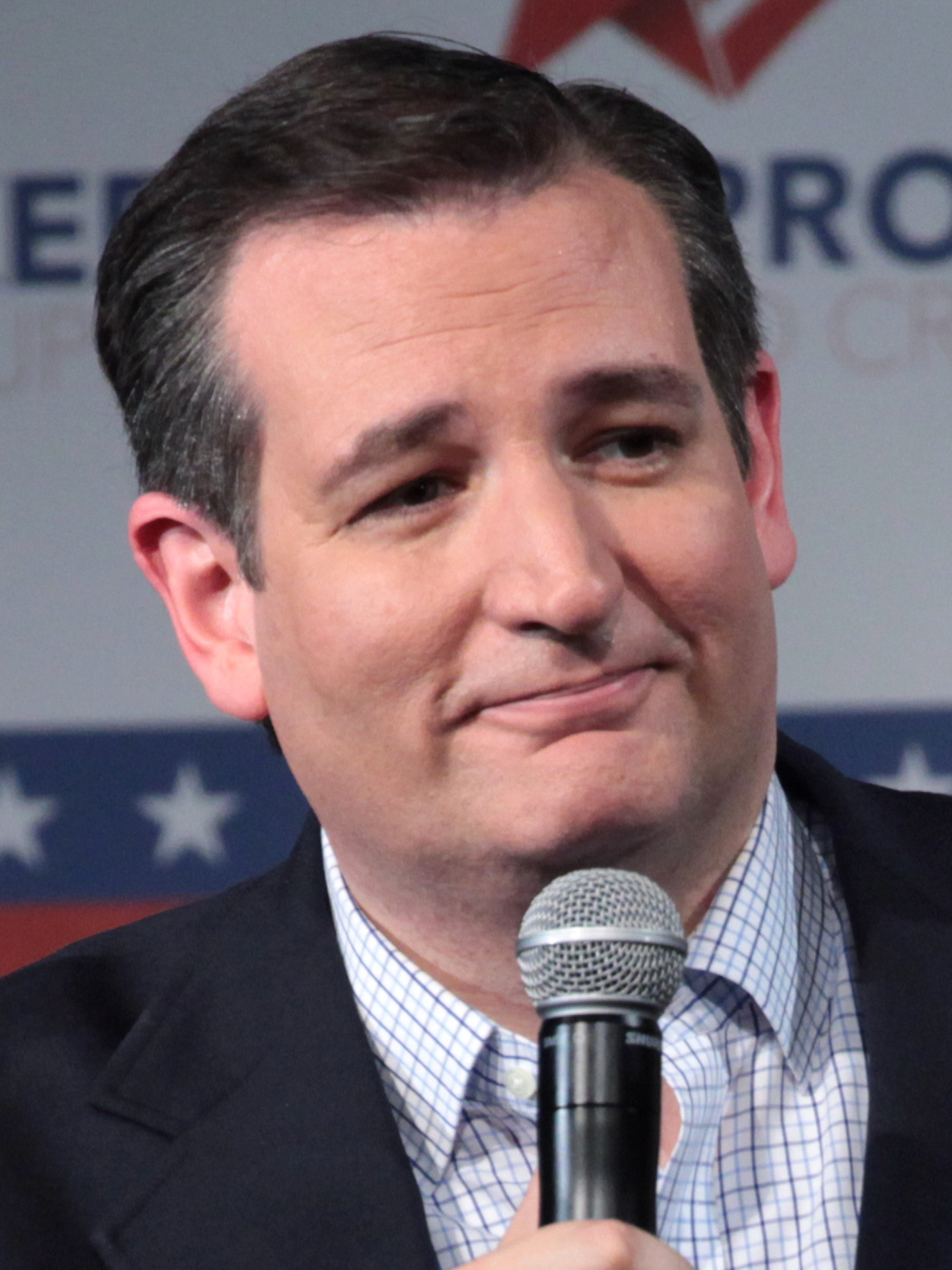

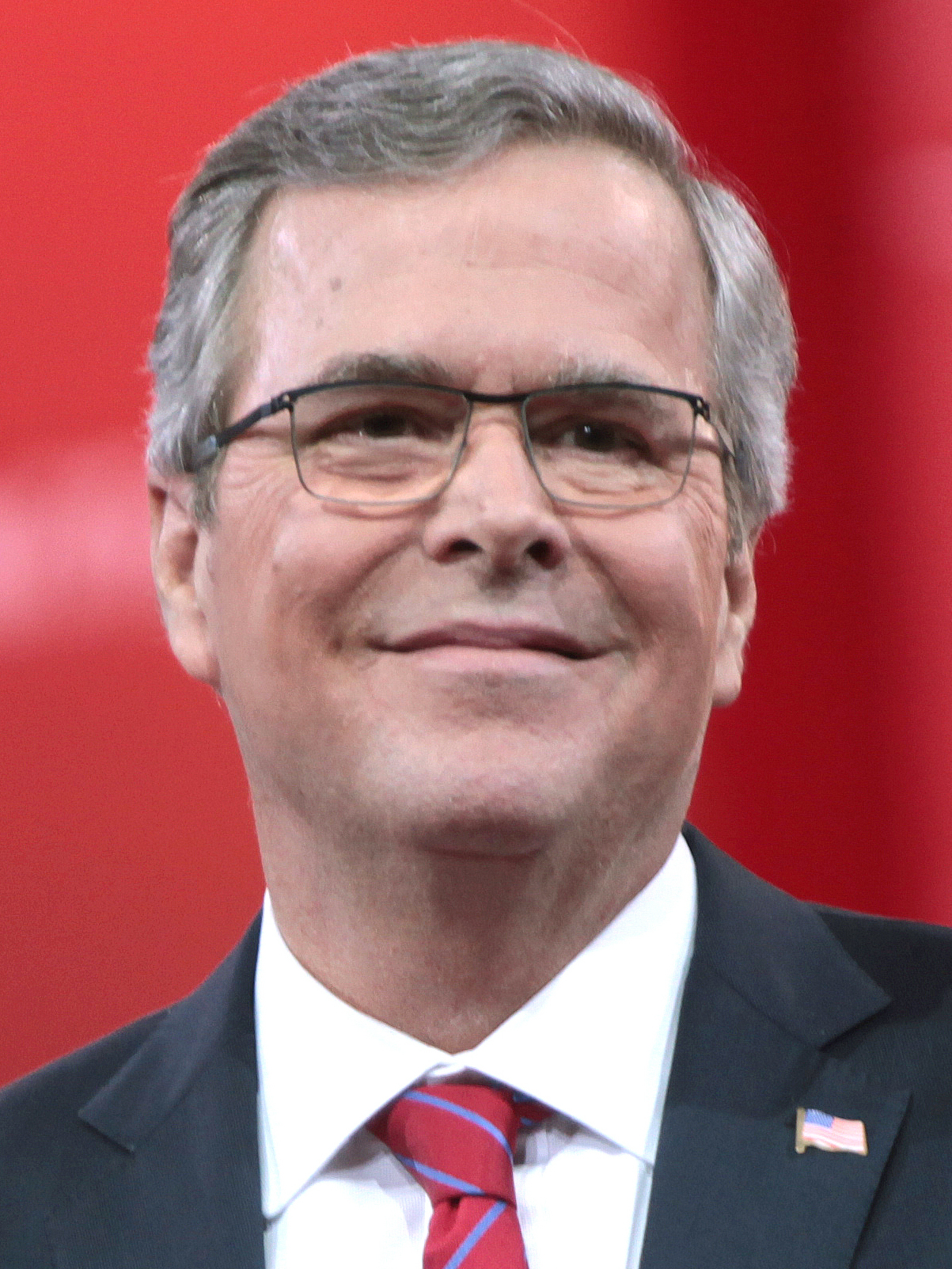

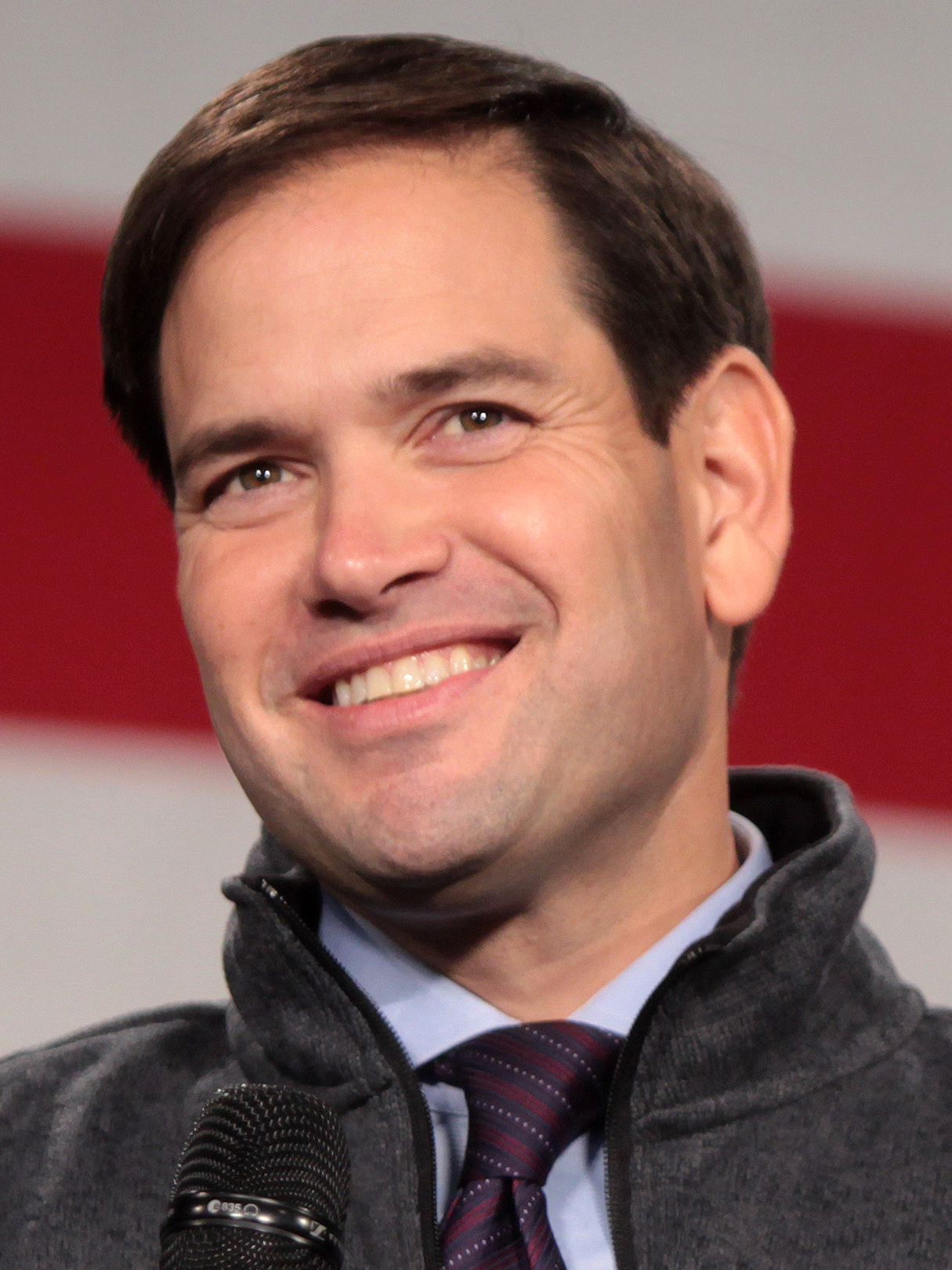

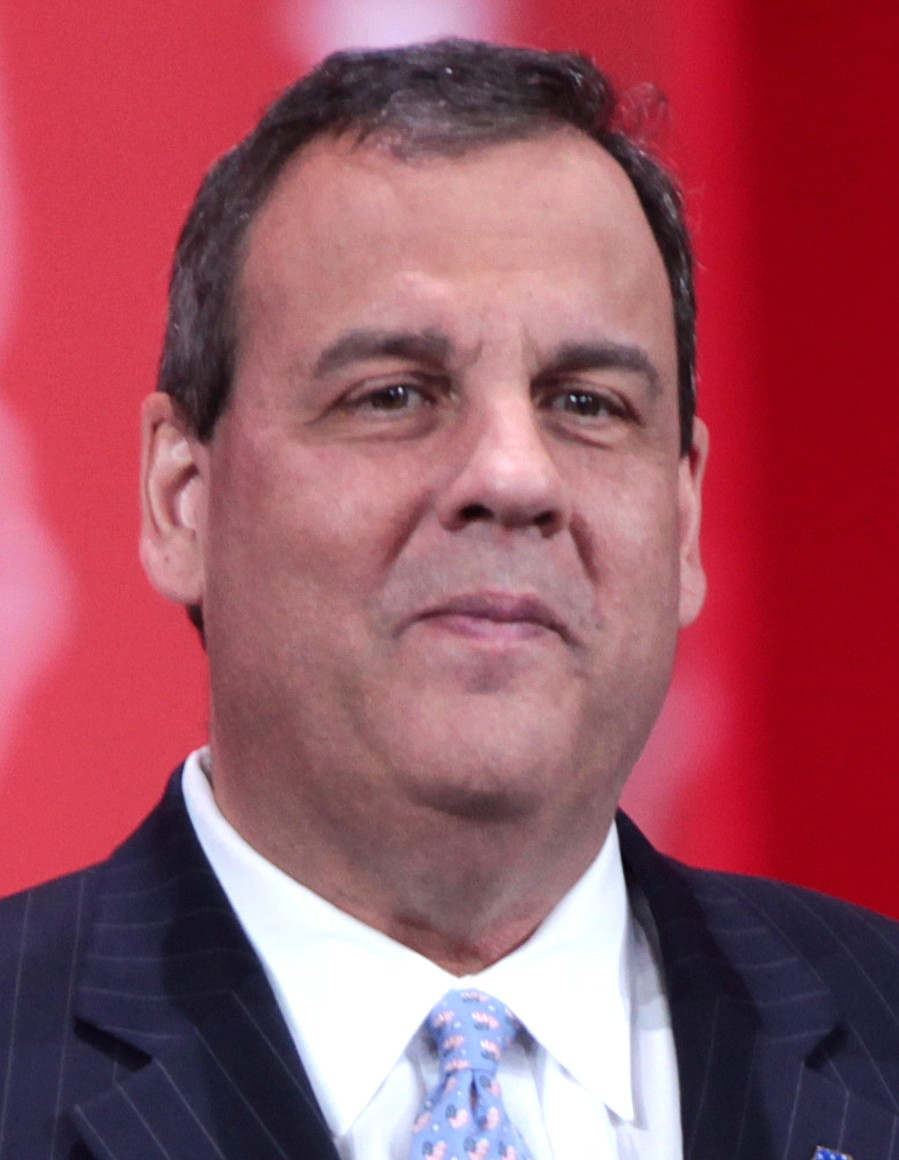
| Candidate | Donald Trump | John Kasich | Ted Cruz |
| Home state | New York | Ohio | Texas |
| Delegate count | 11 | 4 | 3 |
| Popular vote | 100,735 | 44,932 | 33,244 |
| Percentage | 35.23% | 15.72% | 11.63% |
| Candidate | Jeb Bush | Marco Rubio | Chris Christie |
| Home state | Florida | Florida | New Jersey |
| Delegate count | 3 | 2 | 0 |
| Popular vote | 31,341 | 30,071 | 21,089 |
| Percentage | 10.96% | 10.52% | 7.38% |

Donald Trump
20–30%
30–40%
40–50%
50–60%
John Kasich
20–30%
30–40%
40–50%
60–70%
Ted Cruz
50–60%
Tie
No votes

The 2016 New Hampshire Republican presidential primary, which took place on February 9, was the second major vote of the cycle. Donald Trump was declared the winner with 35.2% of the popular vote and picked up 11 delegates, while John Kasich emerged from a pack of candidates between 10 and 20% to capture second place with 15.8% of the vote and picked up four delegates.

Donald Trump swept to victory due to overwhelming 42% support among voters without a college degree. John Kasich managed second place due to his relatively strong support among higher-income Republican voters.

It occurred on the same day as the Democratic primary.

Chris Christie, Carly Fiorina, and Jim Gilmore dropped out of the race after poor showings in the primary.

== Campaign ==
Politico described the 2016 Republican primary in New Hampshire as a "topsy-turvy" campaign that saw "an all-out assault" on "establishment" politics.

Donald Trump dominated the polling results, with Chris Christie, John Kasich, Marco Rubio, and Jeb Bush vying to place second and emerge as the leading mainstream alternative to Trump and to Ted Cruz. In November Chris Christie gained the endorsement of the New Hampshire Union Leader. Candidates receiving the endorsement later received a boost of on average 8 points in the polls, but the endorsed candidate only won a Republican primary in half of the elections from 1980 to 2012. But in late January The Boston Globe and the Concord Monitor endorsed Kasich, leading Politico to dub him the winner of the "newspaper primary."

== Major debates and forums ==
Two major televised gatherings of major candidates took place during the 2015-16 campaign, both took place at the New Hampshire Institute of Politics of Saint Anselm College in Goffstown, New Hampshire.

=== August 3, 2015 – Voters First Presidential Forum ===
The 2016 Voters First Presidential Forum was moderated by Jack Heath of WGIR radio, who asked questions of each of the participating candidates based on a random draw. Candidates each had three opportunities to speak: two rounds of questions, and a closing statement. Topics of discussion during the forum were partially selected based on the results of an online voter survey. The facilities were provided by the New Hampshire Institute of Politics and Political Library of St. Anselm College. The forum was organized in response to the top-ten invitation limitations placed by Fox News and CNN on their first televised debates (see descriptions below).

Eleven of the candidates participated: Senators Ted Cruz, Rand Paul, and Marco Rubio participated in the forum via satellite to avoid missing a vote. Three major Republican candidates who did not participate were Donald Trump (who chose not to attend), Jim Gilmore (who missed the cutoff deadline) and Mike Huckabee (who was invited, but did not respond). Mark Everson did not receive an invitation, albeit after a "serious look."

The Voters First forum was broadcast nationally by C-SPAN as the originating source media entity, beginning at 6:30 p.m. EDT and lasting from 7 to 9 p.m. The event was also simulcast and/or co-sponsored by television stations KCRG-TV in Iowa, New England Cable News in the northeast, WBIN-TV in New Hampshire, WLTX-TV in South Carolina, radio stations New Hampshire Public Radio, WGIR in New Hampshire, iHeartRadio on the internet (C-SPAN is also offering an online version of the broadcast), and newspapers the Cedar Rapids Gazette in Iowa, the Union Leader in New Hampshire, and the Post and Courier in Charleston South Carolina. There was a live audience, with tickets to the event awarded via a lottery.

=== Lesser known candidates forum at Goffstown ===
One of the highlights of the campaign is when the nonrecognized candidates gather together to introduce themselves to the public at this event, which first was held in 1972. Five candidates participated. They were Stephen Comley, Tim Cook, Walter Iwachiw, Andy Martin, and Joe Robinson.

=== February 6, 2016 – Goffstown, New Hampshire ===
| Candidate | Airtime | Polls |
|---|---|---|
| Trump | 15:32 | 33.2% |
| Cruz | 17:34 | 20.7% |
| Rubio | 18:14 | 13.3% |
| Carson | 8:46 | 7.8% |
| Bush | 12:30 | 4.5% |
| Christie | 12:53 | 3.0% |
| Kasich | 10:33 | 2.8% |

The eighth debate was held in New Hampshire, the first state to hold primaries, was organized by ABC News and the Independent Journal Review. It was scheduled to be held in the St Anselm's College Institute of Politics. The eighth debate did not feature an undercard event. David Muir and Martha Raddatz were moderaters, along with WMUR political director Josh McElveen and Mary Katherine Ham.

To participate in the debate, a candidate must either have placed among the top 3 candidates in the popular vote of the Iowa caucus, or placed among the top 6 candidates in an average of New Hampshire or national polls recognized by ABC News. Only polls conducted no earlier than January 1 and released by February 4 were included in the averages.

On February 4, 2016, Jeb Bush, Ben Carson, Chris Christie, Ted Cruz, John Kasich, Marco Rubio, and Donald Trump were invited to the debate. Carly Fiorina and Jim Gilmore were not invited as they did not meet the criteria.

The debate was notable for Rubio's poor performance, where he repeated the same phrase four times, including once while Christie was criticizing him for making "canned" remarks.

== Candidates ==
Twenty-six total candidates were on the ballot in the New Hampshire primary. The following notable candidates were listed in five major polls and participated in authorized debates. U.S. Senator Lindsey Graham of South Carolina and former Governors Bobby Jindal of Louisiana and George Pataki of New York withdrew from the race, but remained on the ballot.

The following were listed in national polls and participated in at least one nationally televised debate.

| Candidate | Résumé | Portrait | popular vote | percentage | Delegates won |
|---|---|---|---|---|---|
| Donald Trump | CEO of The Trump Organization (campaign) | | 100,406 | 35.3% | 11 |
| John Kasich | Governor of Ohio since 2011; U.S. Representative from Ohio 1983–2001; presidential candidate in 2000 (campaign) | | 44,909 | 15.8% | 4 |
| Ted Cruz | U.S. Senator from Texas since 2013; Solicitor General of Texas 2003–2008 (campaign) | | 33,189 | 11.7% | 3 |
| Jeb Bush | Governor of Florida 1999–2007; Florida Secretary of Commerce 1987–1988 (campaign) | | 31,310 | 11% | 3 |
| Marco Rubio | U.S. Senator from Florida since 2011; Florida Speaker of the House 2007–2008 (campaign) | | 30,032 | 10.6% | 2 |
| Chris Christie | Governor of New Jersey since 2010, U.S. Attorney from the district of New Jersey (campaign) | | 21,069 | 7.4% | none |
| Carly Fiorina | Former Hewlett-Packard CEO 1999–2005; nominee for Senate in California in 2010 (campaign) | | 11,706 | 4.1% | none |
| Ben Carson | Author and former Director of Pediatric Neurosurgery at the Johns Hopkins Hospital 1984–2013 (campaign) | | 6,509 | 2.3% | none |
| Jim Gilmore | Presidential candidate in 2008, Governor of Virginia 1998–2002 (campaign) | | 133 | 0.05% | none |

The following were listed in national polls and participated in at least one nationally televised debate, but withdrew their candidacies before the New Hampshire primary.

| Candidate | Résumé | Portrait | popular vote | percentage | Delegates won |
|---|---|---|---|---|---|
| Lindsey Graham | U.S. Senator from South Carolina since 2003; U.S. Representative from South Carolina 1995–2003 (campaign) | | 70 | 0% | none (withdrew from the race earlier) |
| Mike Huckabee | Governor of Arkansas 1996–2007; presidential candidate in 2008 (campaign) | | 215 | 0% | none (withdrew from race after Iowa caucuses) |
| Bobby Jindal | Governor of Louisiana since 2008; U.S. Representative from Louisiana 2005–2008 (campaign) | | 64 | 0% | none (withdrew from race earlier) |
| George Pataki | Governor of New York 1995–2006 (campaign) | | 80 | 0% | none (withdrew from race earlier) |
| Rand Paul | U.S. Senator from Kentucky since 2011 and Ophthalmologist (campaign) | | 1,900 | 0.67% | none (withdrew from race after Iowa caucuses) |
| Rick Santorum | U.S. Senator from Pennsylvania 1995–2007; U.S. Representative from Pennsylvania 1991–1995; presidential candidate in 2012 (campaign) | | 155 | 0% | none (withdrew from race after Iowa caucuses) |

The following candidates have not been listed in major independent polls nor participated in Republican party sanctioned debates:

- Stephen B. Comley Sr., Massachusetts (31 votes)
- Tim Cook, North Carolina (77 votes)
- Brooks A. Cullison, Illinois (54 votes)
- Matt Drozd, Pennsylvania (5 votes)
- J. Daniel Dyas Sr., Alabama (14 votes)
- Kevin Glenn Huey, Colorado (7 votes)
- Walter N. Iwachiw, New York (9 votes)
- Frank Lynch, Florida (47 votes)
- Robert L. Mann, Indiana (5 votes)
- Andy Martin, New Hampshire (169 votes)
- Peter Messina (5 votes)
- Stephen John McCarthy, Ohio (12 votes)
- Chomi Prag, Wisconsin (14 votes)
- Joe Robinson, Massachusetts (44 votes)
- Richard P.H. Witz, Massachusetts (105 votes)

== Endorsements ==
Jeb Bush

U.S. Senators

- Judd Gregg, Senator of New Hampshire (1993–2011)

State Senators

- John Barnes Jr., State Senator of NH-17 (1992-1998) (2000-2012)
- Chuck Morse, State Senator of NH-22 (2002-2006) (2010-Present)
- Russell Prescott, State Senator of NH-23 (2000-2004) (2010-Present)

Newspapers

- The Conway Daily Sun
Chris Christie

U.S. Representatives

- Bill Zeliff, Representative of NH-01 (1991-1997)
- Jeb Bradley, Representative of NH-01 (2003-2007)

State Senators

- Robert Letourneau, State Senator of NH-19 (2004-2010)

Individuals

- Walt Havenstein, Republican Nominee for Governor of New Hampshire in 2014
Ted Cruz

U.S. Senators

- Bob Smith, Senator of New Hampshire (1990–2003)

Executive Council

- Dave Wheeler, Executive Council (2001-2005) (2011-2013) (2015-Present)

State Senators

- Kevin Avard, State Senator of NH-12 (2014-Present)
Carly Fiorina

State Senators

- Jeanie Forrester, State Senator of NH-02 (2010-Present)
- Sharon Carson, State Senator of NH-14 (2008-Present)
- John Reagan, State Senator of NH-17 (2012-Present)

Individuals

- Ovide Lamontagne, Republican Nominee for Governor of New Hampshire in 1996 and 2012
John Kasich

U.S. Senators

- Gordon J. Humphrey, Senator of New Hampshire (1979–1990)
- John E. Sununu, Senator of New Hampshire (2003–2009)

U.S. Representatives

- Charles Bass, Representative of NH-02 (1995–2007) (2011-2013)
- Chuck Douglas, Representative of NH-02 (1989–1991)

State Senators

- David Boutin, State Senator of NH-16 (2010-Present)

Newspapers

- The Portsmouth Herald
- Nashua Telegraph
- Valley News
- Concord Monitor
- The Keene Sentinel
Marco Rubio

Governor

- Craig Benson, Governor of New Hampshire (2003–2005)

State Senators

- Regina Birdsell, State Senator of NH-19 (2014-Present)

=== Withdrawn candidates ===
Jim Gilmore (Withdrawn)

State Senators

- Sam Cataldo, State Senator of NH-06 (2012-Present)
George Pataki (Withdrawn)

State Senators

- Nancy Stiles, State Senator of NH-24 (2010-Present)
Rand Paul (Withdrawn)

State Senators

- Andy Sanborn, State Senator of NH-09 (2012-Present)

== Polling ==
=== Aggregate polls ===
| Source of poll aggregation | Dates administered | Dates updated | Marco Rubio Republican | Donald Trump Republican | Ted Cruz Republican | John Kasich Republican | Margin |
|---|---|---|---|---|---|---|---|
| RealClearPolitics | until February 9, 2016 | February 9, 2016 | 14.0% | 31.2% | 11.8% | 13.5% | Trump +17.2 |
| FiveThirtyEight | until February 9, 2016 | February 9, 2016 | 15.7% | 26.8% | 12.0% | 15.2% | Trump +11.0 |

| Poll source | Date | 1st | 2nd | 3rd | Other |
|---|---|---|---|---|---|
| Primary results | February 9, 2016 | Donald Trump35.23% | John Kasich15.72% | Ted Cruz11.63% | Jeb Bush 10.96%, Marco Rubio 10.52%, Chris Christie 7.38%, Carly Fiorina 4.12%, Ben Carson 2.28%, Rand Paul 0.68%, Mike Huckabee 0.08%, Rick Santorum 0.06%, Jim Gilmore 0.05% |
| ARG Margin of error: ± 5.0% Sample size: 418 | February 7–8, 2016 | Donald Trump; 33% | John Kasich 17% | Marco Rubio 14% | Ted Cruz 10%, Jeb Bush 9%, Chris Christie 8%, Carly Fiorina 3%, Ben Carson 1%, Undecided 6% |
| CNN/UNH/WMUR Margin of error: ± 5.2% Sample size: 362 | February 4–8, 2016 | Donald Trump; 31% | Marco Rubio 17% | Ted Cruz 14% | John Kasich 10%, Jeb Bush 7%, Carly Fiorina 5%, Chris Christie 4%, Ben Carson 3%, Undecided 7% |
| Gravis Marketing/ One America News Margin of error: ± 3.7% Sample size: 705 | February 7, 2016 | Donald Trump; 28% | John Kasich 17% | Marco Rubio 15% | Jeb Bush 14%, Ted Cruz 11%, Chris Christie 6%, Carly Fiorina 5%, Ben Carson 3%, Rand Paul 1%, Rick Santorum 0.5% |
| ARG Margin of error: ± 5.0% Sample size: 427 | February 6–7, 2016 | Donald Trump; 30% | John Kasich 16% | Marco Rubio 16% | Ted Cruz 10%, Jeb Bush 9%, Chris Christie 6%, Carly Fiorina 3%, Ben Carson 1%, Undecided 9% |
| UMass Lowell/7 News Margin of error: ± 5.13% Sample size: 464 | February 5–7, 2016 | Donald Trump; 34% | Marco Rubio 13% | Ted Cruz 13% | Jeb Bush 10%, John Kasich 10%, Chris Christie 5%, Carly Fiorina 4%, Ben Carson 3%, Undecided 9% |
| Emerson College Margin of error: ± 3.7% Sample size: 686 | February 4–7, 2016 | Donald Trump; 31% | Jeb Bush 16% | John Kasich 13% | Marco Rubio 12%, Ted Cruz 11%, Carly Fiorina 7%, Chris Christie 6%, Ben Carson 3%, |
| ARG Margin of error: ± 5.0% Sample size: 422 | February 5–6, 2016 | Donald Trump; 31% | John Kasich 17% | Marco Rubio 17% | Ted Cruz 9%, Jeb Bush 9%, Chris Christie 5%, Carly Fiorina 2%, Ben Carson 1%, Undecided 8% |
| Monmouth University Margin of error: ± 4.4% Sample size: 508 | February 4–6, 2016 | Donald Trump; 30% | John Kasich 14% | Marco Rubio 13% | Jeb Bush 13%, Ted Cruz 12%, Chris Christie 6%, Carly Fiorina 5%, Ben Carson 4%, Other 1%, Undecided 3% |
| UMass Lowell/7 News Margin of error: ± 4.82% Sample size: 516 | February 4–6, 2016 | Donald Trump; 36% | Marco Rubio 14% | Ted Cruz 13% | Jeb Bush 10%, John Kasich 9%, Chris Christie 4%, Carly Fiorina 4%, Ben Carson 3%, Undecided 7% |
| CNN/UNH/WMUR Margin of error: ± 5.2% Sample size: 362 | February 3–6, 2016 | Donald Trump; 33% | Marco Rubio 16% | Ted Cruz 14% | John Kasich 11%, Jeb Bush 7%, Carly Fiorina 6%, Chris Christie 4%, Ben Carson 2%, Someone Else 1%, Not Sure 6% |
| Franklin Pierce University/ RKM/Boston Herald Margin of error: ± 4.7% Sample size: 433 | February 2–6, 2016 | Donald Trump; 31% | Ted Cruz 16% | Marco Rubio 15% | John Kasich 11%, Jeb Bush 10%, Chris Christie 5%, Carly Fiorina 4%, Ben Carson 3%, Other 2%, Unsure 3% |
| ARG Margin of error: ± 5.0% Sample size: 415 | February 4–5, 2016 | Donald Trump; 34% | John Kasich 17% | Marco Rubio 16% | Ted Cruz 9%, Jeb Bush 8%, Chris Christie 5%, Carly Fiorina 2%, Ben Carson 2%, Undecided 6% |
| UMass Lowell/7 News Margin of error: ± 4.86% Sample size: 501 | February 3–5, 2016 | Donald Trump; 35% | Marco Rubio 14% | Ted Cruz 13% | John Kasich 10%, Jeb Bush 10%, Chris Christie 4%, Ben Carson 3%, Carly Fiorina 3%, Undecided 9% |
| Suffolk University/ Boston Globe Margin of error: ± 4.4% Sample size: 500 | February 3–4, 2016 | Donald Trump; 28.8% | Marco Rubio 19.4% | John Kasich 13% | Jeb Bush 9.8%, Ted Cruz 6.6%, Chris Christie 5.2%, Ben Carson 4.4%, Carly Fiorina 3.8%, Other 1%, Undecided 8% |
| ARG Margin of error: ± 5.0% Sample size: 420 | February 3–4, 2016 | Donald Trump; 36% | Marco Rubio 15% | John Kasich 14% | Ted Cruz 12%, Jeb Bush 8%, Chris Christie 6%, Carly Fiorina 2%, Ben Carson 2%, Undecided 6% |
| MassINC/WBUR Margin of error: ± 4.9% Sample size: 410 | February 2–4, 2016 | Donald Trump; 29% | Marco Rubio 12% | Ted Cruz 12% | Jeb Bush 9%, John Kasich 9%, Carly Fiorina 8%, Chris Christie 6%, Ben Carson 4%, Jim Gilmore <1% Other <1%, Won't Vote 1%, Don't Know 5% |
| UMass Lowell/7 News Margin of error: ± 4.8% Sample size: 500 | February 2–4, 2016 | Donald Trump; 34% | Marco Rubio 15% | Ted Cruz 14% | Jeb Bush 8%, John Kasich 8%, Chris Christie 5%, Ben Carson 4%, Carly Fiorina 3%, Other 2%, Undecided 6% |
| CNN/UNH/WMUR Margin of error: ± 6.8% Sample size: 209 | February 2–4, 2016 | Donald Trump; 29% | Marco Rubio 18% | Ted Cruz 13% | John Kasich 12%, Jeb Bush 10%, Chris Christie 4%, Carly Fiorina 4%, Ben Carson 2%, Jim Gilmore 0%, Someone Else 2%, Not Sure 8% |
| NBC News/WSJ/Marist Margin of error: ± 3.8% Sample size: 653 | February 2–3, 2016 | Donald Trump; 30% | Marco Rubio 17% | Ted Cruz 15% | John Kasich 10%, Jeb Bush 9%, Chris Christie 4%, Ben Carson 4%, Carly Fiorina 2%, Other 1%, Undecided 7% |
| ARG Margin of error: ± 5.0% Sample size: 600 | February 2–3, 2016 | Donald Trump; 34% | Marco Rubio 14% | John Kasich 13% | Ted Cruz 12%, Jeb Bush 8%, Chris Christie 4%, Carly Fiorina 4%, Ben Carson 2%, Undecided 8% |
| UMass Lowell/7 News Margin of error: ± 4.87% Sample size: 487 | February 1–3, 2016 | Donald Trump; 36% | Marco Rubio 15% | Ted Cruz 14% | Jeb Bush 8%, John Kasich 7%, Chris Christie 5%, Ben Carson 4%, Carly Fiorina 3%, Other 8% |
| Harper Polling Margin of error: ± 4.75% Sample size: 425 | February 1–2, 2016 | Donald Trump; 31% | Jeb Bush 14% | John Kasich 12% | Marco Rubio 10%, Ted Cruz 9%, Chris Christie 6%, Carly Fiorina 5%, Ben Carson 3%, Rand Paul 3%, Rick Santorum 0%, Mike Huckabee 0%, Jim Gilmore 0%, Undecided 8% |
| UMass Lowell/7 News Margin of error: ± 4.8% Sample size: 502 | January 31– February 2, 2016 | Donald Trump; 38% | Ted Cruz 14% | Marco Rubio 12% | Jeb Bush 9%, John Kasich 7%, Chris Christie 6%, Ben Carson 3%, Carly Fiorina 3%, Rand Paul 2%, Rick Santorum 0%, Other 2%, Unsure 4% |
| UMass Amherst/ WBZ-TV/YouGov Margin of error: ± 7.1% Sample size: 390 | January 29– February 2, 2016 | Donald Trump; 35% | Marco Rubio 15% | John Kasich 11% | Ted Cruz 9%, Jeb Bush 8%, Chris Christie 5%, Ben Carson 4%, Carly Fiorina 3%, Other 8%, Unsure 3% |
| ARG Margin of error: ± 4.0% Sample size: 600 | January 29–31, 2016 | Donald Trump; 34% | John Kasich 16% | Marco Rubio 11% | Ted Cruz 10%, Jeb Bush 9%, Chris Christie 6%, Rand Paul 2%, Carly Fiorina 2%, Ben Carson 2%, Rick Santorum 1%, Mike Huckabee 0%, Undecided 6% |
| UMass Lowell/7 News Margin of error: ± 5.1% Sample size: 461 | January 29–31, 2016 | Donald Trump; 38% | Ted Cruz 12% | John Kasich 9% | Jeb Bush 9%, Marco Rubio 8%, Chris Christie 7%, Rand Paul 3%, Ben Carson 3%, Carly Fiorina 2%, Rick Santorum 1%, Mike Huckabee 0%, Other 2%, Not Sure 5% |
| CNN/UNH/WMUR Margin of error: ± 4.8% Sample size: 409 | January 27–30, 2016 | Donald Trump; 30% | Ted Cruz 12% | Marco Rubio 11% | John Kasich 9%, Chris Christie 8%, Jeb Bush 6%, Carly Fiorina 4%, Rand Paul 3%, Ben Carson 3%, Mike Huckabee 1%, Jim Gilmore 0%, Rick Santorum 0%, Other 3%, Not Sure 10% |
| Franklin Pierce/RKM/ Boston Herald Margin of error: ± 4.7% Sample size: 439 | January 26–30, 2016 | Donald Trump; 38% | Ted Cruz 13% | Jeb Bush 10% | Marco Rubio 10%, John Kasich 8%, Chris Christie 5%, Carly Fiorina 5%, Rand Paul 5%, Ben Carson 3%, Mike Huckabee 1%, Rick Santorum 0%, Other 2%, Unsure 2% |
| Suffolk University Margin of error: ± 4.4% Sample size: 500 | January 25–27, 2016 | Donald Trump; 26.6% | John Kasich 12% | Ted Cruz 11.8% | Jeb Bush 11.2%, Marco Rubio 9.6%, Chris Christie 5.6%, Ben Carson 4.8%, Carly Fiorina 4%, Rand Paul 1.6%, Mike Huckabee 0.4%, Jim Gilmore 0.2%, Rick Santorum 0%, Other 0.4%, Undecided 11.8% |
| Adrian Gray Consulting Margin of error: ± 4% Sample size: 583 | January 25–27, 2016 | Donald Trump; 27% | Marco Rubio 15% | Ted Cruz 13% | John Kasich 12%, Jeb Bush 11%, Chris Christie 6%, Rand Paul 4%, Ben Carson 3%, Carly Fiorina 2%, Mike Huckabee 1%, Rick Santorum 0%, Don't know 5% |
| Emerson College Margin of error: ± 5.0% Sample size: 373 | January 25–26, 2016 | Donald Trump; 35% | Jeb Bush 18% | John Kasich 14% | Marco Rubio 9%, Ted Cruz 8%, Chris Christie 5%, Carly Fiorina 3%, Ben Carson 3%, Rand Paul 3%, Mike Huckabee 1%, Rick Santorum 0%, Jim Gilmore 0%, Other 0%, Undecided 1% |
| ARG Margin of error: ± 4.0% Sample size: 600 | January 23–25, 2016 | Donald Trump; 31% | John Kasich 17% | Ted Cruz 12% | Marco Rubio 9%, Chris Christie 8%, Jeb Bush 8%, Carly Fiorina 3%, Rand Paul 2%, Ben Carson 2%, Mike Huckabee 1%, Rick Santorum 1%, Jim Gilmore 0%, Other 1%, Undecided 6% |
| Franklin Pierce/RKM/Boston Herald Margin of error: ± 4.7% Sample size: 444 | January 20–24, 2016 | Donald Trump; 33% | Ted Cruz 14% | John Kasich 12% | Jeb Bush 9%, Marco Rubio 8%, Chris Christie 7%, Carly Fiorina 5%, Ben Carson 4%, Rand Paul 3%, Mike Huckabee 1%, Rick Santorum 0%, Other 1%, Unsure 3% |
| NBC/WSJ/Marist Margin of error: ± 4.0% Sample size: 612 | January 17–23, 2016 | Donald Trump; 31% | Ted Cruz 12% | Marco Rubio/ John Kasich 11% | Jeb Bush 8%, Chris Christie 7%, Ben Carson 5%, Carly Fiorina 4%, Rand Paul 4%, Mike Huckabee 1%, Other 1%, Undecided 5% |
| Fox News Margin of error: ± 5.0% Sample size: 401 | January 19–21, 2016 | Donald Trump; 31% | Ted Cruz 14% | Marco Rubio 13% | John Kasich 9%, Chris Christie 7%, Jeb Bush 7%, Rand Paul 5%, Ben Carson 5%, Carly Fiorina 3%, Mike Huckabee 1%, None of the above 1%, Don't know 5% |
| CBS/YouGov Margin of error: ± 6.2% Sample size: 476 | January 19–21, 2016 | Donald Trump; 34% | Ted Cruz 16% | Marco Rubio 14% | John Kasich 10%, Chris Christie 7%, Jeb Bush 7%, Ben Carson 5%, Carly Fiorina 4%, Rand Paul 3%, Mike Huckabee 0%, Rick Santorum 0%, Jim Gilmore 0%, No Preference 0% |
| ARG Margin of error: ± 4.0% Sample size: 600 | January 15–18, 2016 | Donald Trump; 27% | John Kasich 20% | Marco Rubio 10% | Ted Cruz 9%, Chris Christie 9%, Jeb Bush 8%, Rand Paul 5%, Carly Fiorina 2%, Ben Carson 2%, Mike Huckabee 1%, Rick Santorum 1%, Jim Gilmore 0%, Other 1%, Undecided 7% |
| CNN/UNH/WMUR Margin of error: ± 4.8% Sample size: 414 | January 13–18, 2016 | Donald Trump; 34% | Ted Cruz 14% | Marco Rubio 10% | Jeb Bush 10%, Rand Paul 6%, Chris Christie 6%, John Kasich 6%, Carly Fiorina 4%, Ben Carson 3%, Mike Huckabee 1%, Rick Santorum 0%, Don't know 6% |
| Mason-Dixon/AARP Margin of error: ± 4.5% Sample size: 503 | January 12–16, 2016 | Donald Trump; 32% | Marco Rubio 14% | John Kasich 13% | Chris Christie 10%, Jeb Bush 9%, Ted Cruz 8%, Carly Fiorina 6%, Ben Carson 2%, Rand Paul 2%, Mike Huckabee 1%, Rick Santorum 0%, Undecided 4% |
| ARG Margin of error: ± 4.0% Sample size: 600 | January 7–10, 2016 | Donald Trump; 25% | Marco Rubio/ John Kasich 14% | Chris Christie 10% | Ted Cruz 9%, Jeb Bush 8%, Rand Paul 4%, Carly Fiorina 3%, Ben Carson 2%, Mike Huckabee 1%, Rick Santorum 1%, Jim Gilmore 0%, Other 0%, Undecided 8% |
| Monmouth University Margin of error: ± 4.8% Sample size: 414 | January 7–10, 2016 | Donald Trump; 32% | John Kasich/ Ted Cruz 14% | Marco Rubio 12% | Chris Christie 8%, Carly Fiorina 5%, Jeb Bush 4%, Rand Paul 4%, Ben Carson 3%, Mike Huckabee 1%, Rick Santorum 0%, Other 0%, Undecided 3% |
| NBC/WSJ/Marist Margin of error: ± 4.1% Sample size: 569 | January 2–7, 2016 | Donald Trump; 30% | Marco Rubio 14% | Chris Christie 12% | Ted Cruz 10%, John Kasich 9%, Jeb Bush 9%, Rand Paul 5%, Ben Carson 4%, Carly Fiorina 3%, Mike Huckabee <1%, Other <1%, Undecided 5% |
| NH1/Reach Margin of error: ± 3.1% Sample size: 1000 | January 7, 2016 | Donald Trump; 31.7% | Jeb Bush 11.9% | John Kasich 11.8% | Chris Christie 11.0%, Ted Cruz 9.7%, Marco Rubio 8.9%, Carly Fiorina 4.6%, Ben Carson 3.8%, Rand Paul 3.0%, Rick Santorum 2.6%, Mike Huckabee 1.0% |
| Fox News Margin of error: ± 3.5% Sample size: 414 | January 4–7, 2016 | Donald Trump; 33% | Marco Rubio 15% | Ted Cruz 12% | Jeb Bush 9%, John Kasich 7%, Rand Paul 5%, Chris Christie 5%, Ben Carson 4%, Carly Fiorina 3%, Mike Huckabee 0%, Rick Santorum 0%, Jim Gilmore 0%, Undecided 4% |
| Public Policy Polling Margin of error: ± 4.3% Sample size: 515 | January 4–6, 2016 | Donald Trump; 29% | Marco Rubio 15% | Chris Christie/ John Kasich 11% | Ted Cruz 10%, Jeb Bush 10%, Carly Fiorina 4%, Ben Carson 4%, Rand Paul 3%, Mike Huckabee 1%, Rick Santorum 1%, Undecided 2% |

== Results ==
New Hampshire Republican primary, February 9, 2016
| Candidate | Votes | Percentage | Actual delegate count | | |
| Candidate | Votes | Percentage | Bound | Unbound | Total |
|---|---|---|---|---|---|
| Donald Trump | 100,735 | 35.23% | 11 | 0 | 11 |
| John Kasich | 44,932 | 15.72% | 4 | 0 | 4 |
| Ted Cruz | 33,244 | 11.63% | 3 | 0 | 3 |
| Jeb Bush | 31,341 | 10.96% | 3 | 0 | 3 |
| Marco Rubio | 30,071 | 10.52% | 2 | 0 | 2 |
| Chris Christie | 21,089 | 7.38% | 0 | 0 | 0 |
| Carly Fiorina | 11,774 | 4.12% | 0 | 0 | 0 |
| Ben Carson | 6,527 | 2.28% | 0 | 0 | 0 |
| Rand Paul (withdrawn) | 1,930 | 0.68% | 0 | 0 | 0 |
| Write-ins | 2,912 | 1.02% | 0 | 0 | 0 |
| Mike Huckabee (withdrawn) | 216 | 0.08% | 0 | 0 | 0 |
| Andy Martin | 202 | 0.07% | 0 | 0 | 0 |
| Rick Santorum (withdrawn) | 160 | 0.06% | 0 | 0 | 0 |
| Jim Gilmore | 134 | 0.05% | 0 | 0 | 0 |
| Richard Witz | 104 | 0.04% | 0 | 0 | 0 |
| George Pataki (withdrawn) | 79 | 0.03% | 0 | 0 | 0 |
| Lindsey Graham (withdrawn) | 73 | 0.03% | 0 | 0 | 0 |
| Brooks Andrews Cullison | 56 | 0.02% | 0 | 0 | 0 |
| Timothy Cook | 55 | 0.02% | 0 | 0 | 0 |
| Bobby Jindal (withdrawn) | 53 | 0.02% | 0 | 0 | 0 |
| Frank Lynch | 47 | 0.02% | 0 | 0 | 0 |
| Joe Robinson | 44 | 0.02% | 0 | 0 | 0 |
| Stephen Bradley Comley | 32 | 0.01% | 0 | 0 | 0 |
| Chomi Prag | 16 | 0.01% | 0 | 0 | 0 |
| Jacob Daniel Dyas | 15 | 0.01% | 0 | 0 | 0 |
| Stephen John McCarthy | 12 | 0% | 0 | 0 | 0 |
| Walter Iwachiw | 9 | 0% | 0 | 0 | 0 |
| Kevin Glenn Huey | 8 | 0% | 0 | 0 | 0 |
| Matt Drozd | 6 | 0% | 0 | 0 | 0 |
| Robert Lawrence Mann | 5 | 0% | 0 | 0 | 0 |
| Peter Messina | 5 | 0% | 0 | 0 | 0 |
| Unprojected delegates: | | | 0 | 0 | 0 |
| Total: | 285,916 | 100.00% | 23 | 0 | 23 |
Source: The Green Papers

Note: Delegates were awarded to candidates who got 10% or more of the vote proportionally. Of the 25 candidate/hopefuls, five candidates garnered delegates.

=== By county ===
2016 New Hampshire Republican primaries (by county)
| County | Donald Trump | | John Kasich | | Ted Cruz | | Jeb Bush | | Marco Rubio | | Chris Christie | | All Other Candidates (Note: Includes the vote totals of Carly Fiorina, Ben Carson, Rand Paul, Mike Huckabee, Rick Santorum, and any other write-in candidates or votes.) | | Total |
| County | # | % | # | % | # | % | # | % | # | % | # | % | # | % | Total |
|---|---|---|---|---|---|---|---|---|---|---|---|---|---|---|---|
| Belknap | 5,508 | 35.16% | 2,464 | 15.73% | 2,019 | 12.89% | 1,741 | 11.11% | 1,511 | 9.64% | 1,002 | 6.40% | 1,422 | 9.07% | 15,667 |
| Carroll | 4,170 | 33.95% | 2,279 | 18.55% | 1,357 | 11.05% | 1,240 | 10.09% | 1,430 | 11.64% | 883 | 7.19% | 925 | 7.54% | 12,284 |
| Cheshire | 4,533 | 33.42% | 2,177 | 16.05% | 1,888 | 13.92% | 1,500 | 11.06% | 1,237 | 9.12% | 754 | 5.56% | 1,473 | 10.87% | 13,562 |
| Coos | 2,184 | 36.99% | 943 | 15.97% | 601 | 10.18% | 562 | 9.52% | 614 | 10.40% | 355 | 6.01% | 645 | 10.93% | 5,904 |
| Grafton | 4,897 | 29.36% | 3,475 | 20.83% | 1,726 | 10.35% | 1,864 | 11.17% | 1,926 | 11.55% | 1,068 | 6.40% | 1,725 | 10.35% | 16,681 |
| Hillsborough | 29,328 | 34.89% | 12,517 | 14.89% | 9,606 | 11.43% | 9,584 | 11.40% | 8,824 | 10.50% | 7,155 | 8.51% | 7,049 | 8.40% | 84,063 |
| Merrimack | 10,959 | 33.02% | 6,178 | 18.61% | 3,781 | 11.39% | 3,814 | 11.49% | 3,062 | 9.23% | 2,376 | 7.16% | 3,022 | 9.11% | 33,192 |
| Rockingham | 28,718 | 38.73% | 10,370 | 13.98% | 7,991 | 10.78% | 7,748 | 10.45% | 8,074 | 10.89% | 5,783 | 7.80% | 5,474 | 7.37% | 74,158 |
| Strafford | 7,358 | 33.40% | 3,195 | 14.50% | 3,324 | 15.09% | 2,444 | 11.10% | 2,505 | 11.37% | 1,225 | 5.56% | 1,976 | 8.97% | 22,027 |
| Sullivan | 3,080 | 36.73% | 1,334 | 15.91% | 951 | 11.34% | 844 | 10.07% | 888 | 10.59% | 488 | 5.82% | 800 | 9.54% | 8,385 |
| Totals | 100,735 | 35.23% | 44,932 | 15.71% | 33,244 | 11.63% | 31,341 | 10.96% | 30,071 | 10.52% | 21,089 | 7.38% | 24,511 | 8.58% | 285,923 |

== Exit polls ==
2016 New Hampshire Republican Primary by demographic subgroup (Edison exit polling)
| Demographic subgroup | Cruz | Trump | Rubio | Kasich | Bush | % of total vote |
|---|---|---|---|---|---|---|
| Total vote | 11.6 | 35.2 | 10.5 | 15.7 | 11.0 | 90% |
Gender
| Men | 12 | 38 | 9 | 16 | 8 | 52% |
| Women | 11 | 33 | 12 | 16 | 14 | 48% |
Age
| 17–29 years old | 17 | 38 | 12 | 11 | 10 | 15% |
| 30–44 years old | 12 | 36 | 18 | 12 | 7 | 17% |
| 45–64 years old | 11 | 36 | 8 | 18 | 11 | 49% |
| 65+ years old | 9 | 31 | 11 | 19 | 15 | 19% |
Income
| Under $30,000 | 14 | 39 | 9 | 7 | 16 | 10% |
| $30,000 - $49,999 | 12 | 40 | 9 | 13 | 9 | 16% |
| $50,000 - $99,999 | 12 | 37 | 10 | 16 | 11 | 33% |
| $100,000 - $199,999 | 10 | 32 | 13 | 19 | 11 | 31% |
| Over $200,000 | 9 | 32 | 12 | 20 | 13 | 10% |
Education
| College Graduate | 11 | 30 | 12 | 19 | 12 | 53% |
| Non-college | 13 | 42 | 10 | 12 | 9 | 47% |
Issue regarded as most important
| Immigration | 21 | 44 | 8 | 5 | 6 | 15% |
| Economy | 6 | 30 | 12 | 24 | 12 | 33% |
| Terrorism | 12 | 28 | 13 | 15 | 14 | 24% |
| Government spending | 13 | 28 | 8 | 15 | 10 | 26% |
Area type
| Urban | 12 | 37 | 9 | 13 | 12 | 10% |
| Suburban | 11 | 37 | 11 | 14 | 11 | 54% |
| Rural | 12 | 33 | 11 | 19 | 11 | 37% |
Religion
| Evangelical | 24 | 28 | 13 | 11 | 11 | 23% |
| Non-Evangelical | 8 | 38 | 10 | 18 | 11 | 77% |
Gun household
| Yes | 12 | 40 | 8 | 13 | 10 | 57% |
| No | 9 | 28 | 15 | 21 | 13 | 43% |

== Analysis ==
According to exit polls by Edison Research, Trump's landslide in New Hampshire could be attributed to strong support from non-college whites and voters holding a moderate political ideology. Trump amassed the largest margin of victory in a New Hampshire Republican primary since 2000, when John McCain upset George W. Bush. In his victory speech, Trump promised, "I am going to be the greatest jobs president that God ever created," and that he will "knock the hell out of ISIS." Trump's tough-on-terror message resonated in the state, where 65% of Republican voters supported his proposed Muslim ban.

== See also ==
- 2016 New Hampshire Democratic presidential primary
- 2016 United States presidential election
