= 2016 Massachusetts Republican presidential primary =

- March 1, 2016

42 pledged delegates to the Republican National Convention
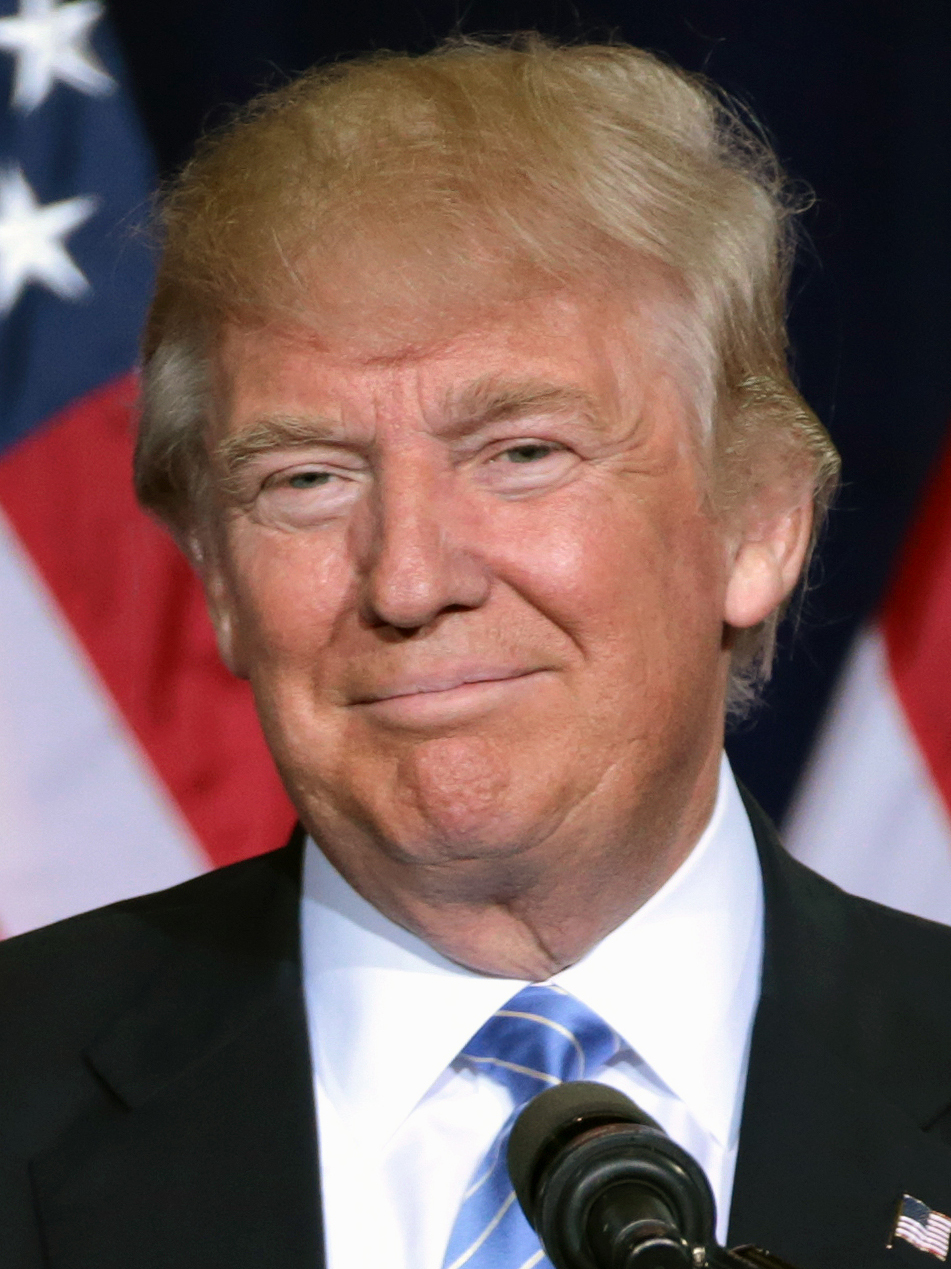

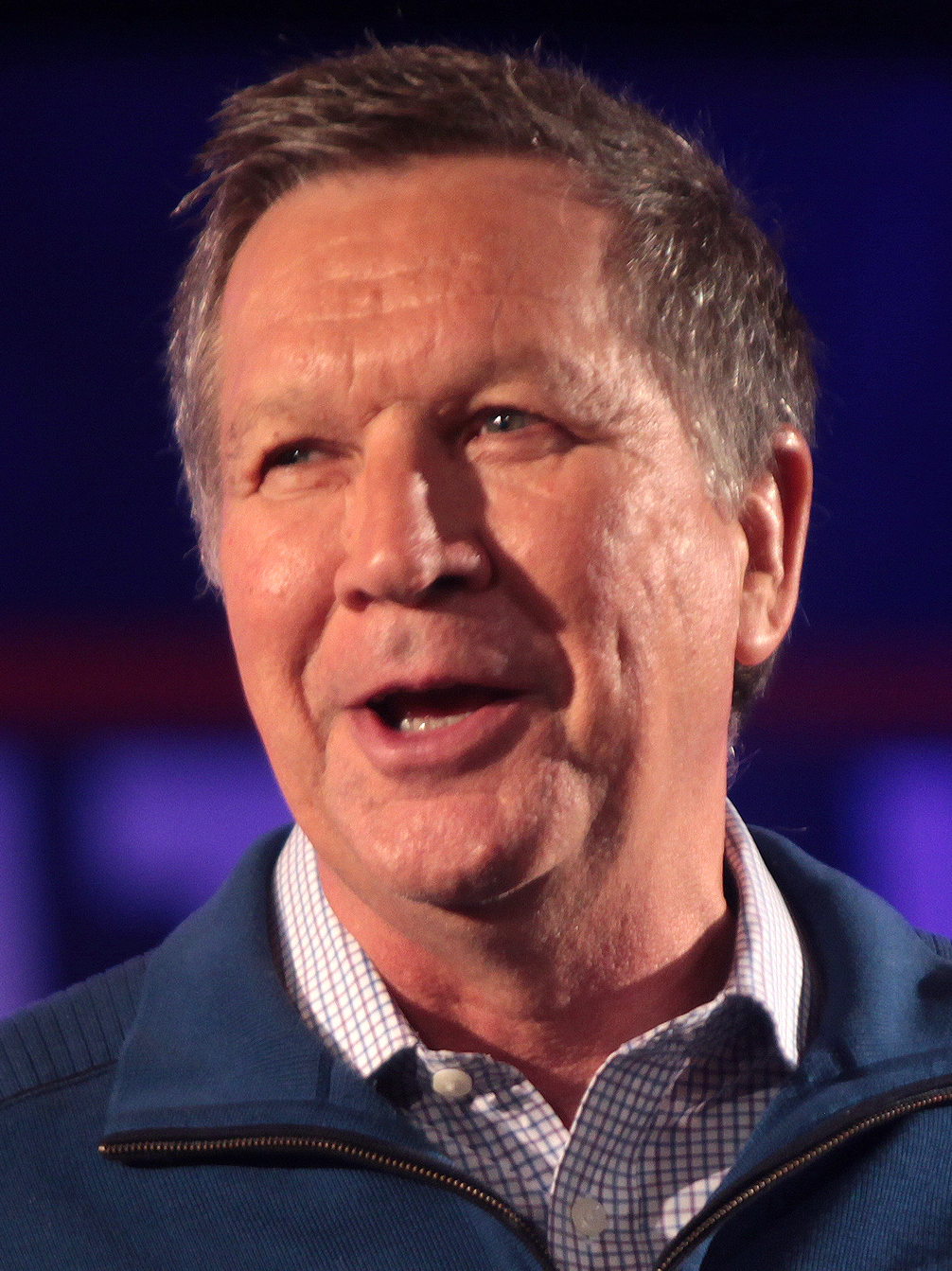

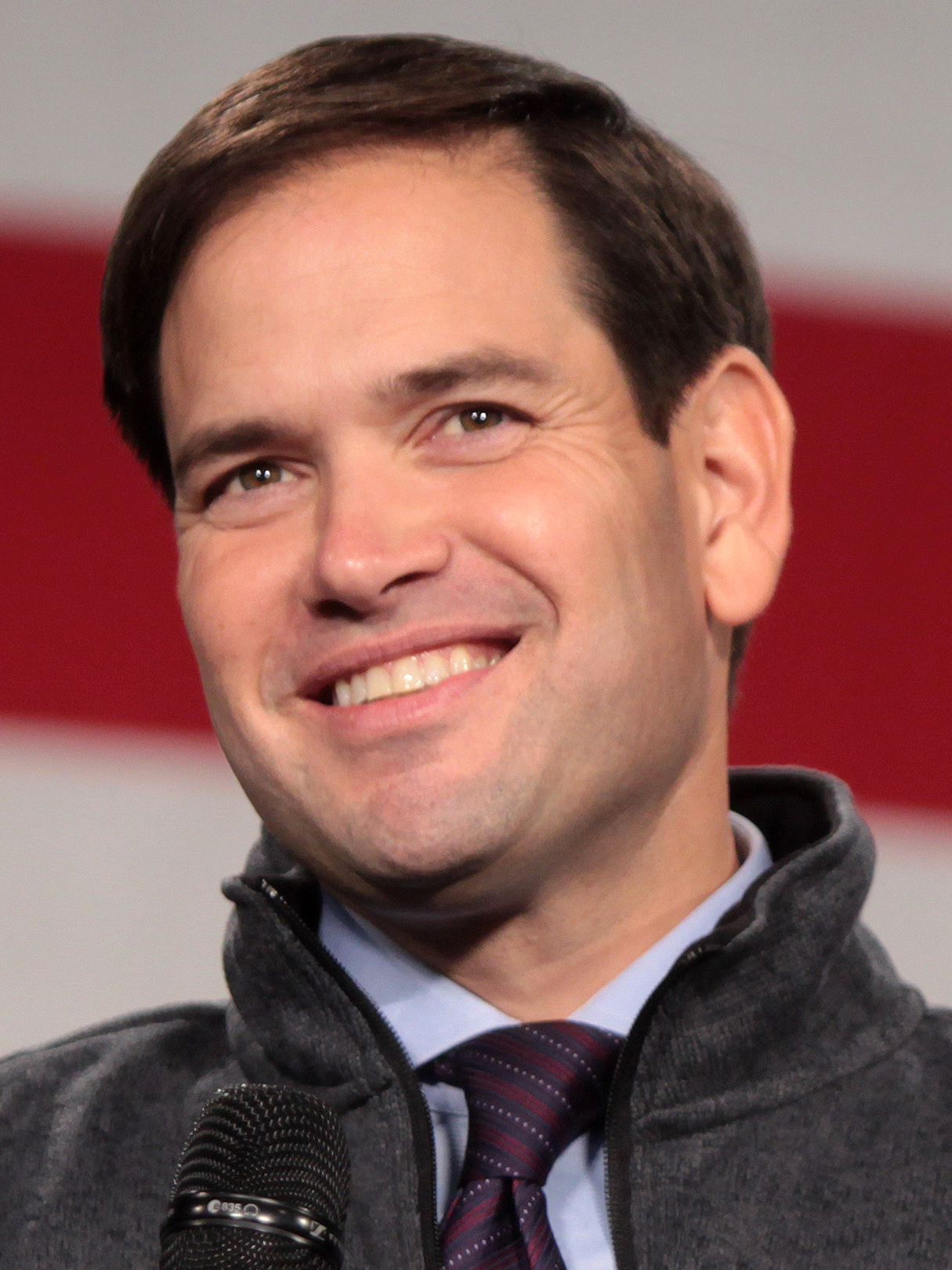

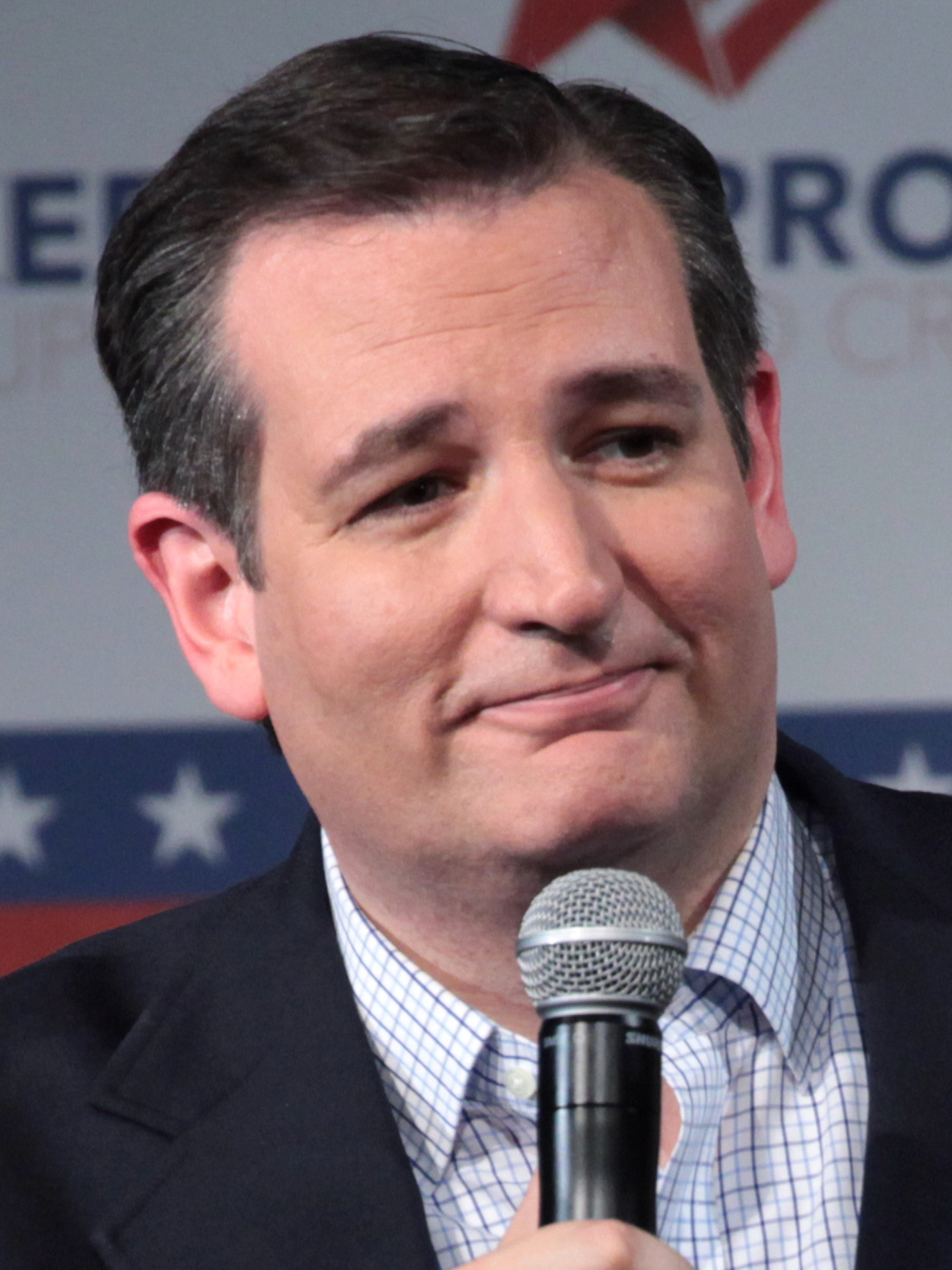
Candidate	Donald Trump	John Kasich
Home state	New York	Ohio
Delegate count	22	8
Popular vote	311,313	113,783
Percentage	49.3%	18.0%
Candidate	Marco Rubio	Ted Cruz
Home state	Florida	Texas
Delegate count	8	4
Popular vote	112,822	60,473
Percentage	17.9%	9.6%

Donald Trump
20–30%
30–40%
40–50%
50–60%
60–70%
70–80%
80-90%
90-100%
John Kasich
20–30%
30–40%
40–50%
50-60%
Marco Rubio
20-30%
30–40%
40-50%
50-60%
60-70%
Ted Cruz
20-30%
30–40%
40-50%
50-60%
60-70%
Tie

The 2016 Massachusetts Republican presidential primary was held on Tuesday March 1, as one of the Republican Party's 2016 presidential primaries. Massachusetts was one of eleven states that held both their Democratic and Republican presidential primaries on that day, dubbed "Super Tuesday". 42 delegates were allocated proportionally to all candidates who received at least 5 percent of the vote in the primary.

== State of the campaign ==
Donald Trump won the Massachusetts primary comfortably, in keeping with polls that had shown him with double-digit leads over his primary rivals in the state. Trump's victory also reflected his relative strength among Republicans in the Northeastern United States. Trump received about 49% of the vote statewide. John Kasich and Marco Rubio came in second and third, respectively, each with about 18% of the vote. Ted Cruz came in fourth with just under 10% of the vote. Of the state's 42 delegates, Trump received 22 of them, Kasich and Rubio each received eight, and Cruz received four.

Donald Trump enjoyed the endorsement of former Senator Scott Brown, who stumped for him in Massachusetts and New Hampshire ahead of the primary.

== Endorsements ==
John Kasich

Newspapers

- The Boston Globe
- Daily Hampshire Gazette (Northampton)
Donald Trump
- Scott Brown, former U.S. Senator

== Polling ==
=== Aggregate polls ===
Source of poll aggregation	Dates administered	Dates updated	Marco Rubio Republican	Donald Trump Republican	Ted Cruz Republican	John Kasich Republican	Margin
RealClearPolitics	until March 1, 2016	March 1, 2016	18.5%	45.3%	11.0%	15.3%	Trump +26.8
FiveThirtyEight	until March 1, 2016	March 1, 2016	19.2%	50.0%	9.9%	15.6%	Trump +30.8

Poll source	Date	1st	2nd	3rd	Other
Primary results	March 1, 2016	Donald Trump48.99%	John Kasich17.94%	Marco Rubio17.75%	Ted Cruz 9.50%, Ben Carson 2.57%, Jeb Bush 1.03%, Chris Christie 0.30%, Rand Paul 0.29%, Carly Fiorina 0.18%, Jim Gilmore 0.12%, Mike Huckabee 0.11%, Mike Huckabee 0.08%, George Pataki 0.08%, Rick Santorum 0.05%
Emerson College Margin of error: ± 4.8% Sample size: 408	February 26–28, 2016	Donald Trump; 51%	Marco Rubio 20%	John Kasich 14%	Ted Cruz 10%, Ben Carson 1%, Undecided 1%
UMass Amherst/WBZ Margin of error: ± 6.3% Sample size: 292	February 24–26, 2016	Donald Trump; 47%	Marco Rubio 15%	Ted Cruz 15%	John Kasich 11%, Ben Carson 2%, Other 7%, Don't Know 3%
Suffolk University Margin of error: ± 4.4% Sample size: 500	February 24–26, 2016	Donald Trump; 42.6%	Marco Rubio 19.8%	John Kasich 17%	Ted Cruz 8.8%, Ben Carson 3.8%, Other 1%, Don't Know 7%
MassINC/WBUR Margin of error: ± 4.9% Sample size: 386	February 21–23, 2016	Donald Trump; 39%	Marco Rubio 18%	John Kasich 17%	Ted Cruz 9%, Ben Carson 5%, Don't Know 12%
Emerson College Margin of error: ± 5.7% Sample size: 289	February 19–21, 2016	Donald Trump; 50%	Marco Rubio 16%	John Kasich 13%	Ted Cruz 10%, Ben Carson 2%
Suffolk University Margin of error: ± ?% Sample size: 134	November 19–22, 2015	Donald Trump; 32%	Marco Rubio 18%	Ted Cruz 10%	Jeb Bush 7%, Ben Carson 5%, Carly Fiorina 4%, Chris Christie 4%, John Kasich 2%, Rand Paul 1%, Mike Huckabee 0%, Rick Santorum 0%, Lindsey Graham 0%, George Pataki 0%, Jim Gilmore 0%, Undecided 14%
Emerson College Margin of error: ± 5.9% Sample size: 271	October 16–18, 2015	Donald Trump; 47.8%	Ben Carson 13.9%	Marco Rubio 11.8%	Jeb Bush 7.1%, Carly Fiorina 6.5%, Ted Cruz 5.1%, John Kasich 2.8%, Chris Christie 2.3%, Lindsey Graham 0.9%, Mike Huckabee 0.4%, Rand Paul 0.1%, Undecided 1.4%
Emerson College Margin of error: ± ? Sample size: 216	March 14–19, 2015	Jeb Bush; 19%	Scott Walker; 19%	Ben Carson 13%	Rand Paul 7%, Chris Christie 6%, Ted Cruz 6%, Mike Huckabee 3%, Other/Undecided 28%
Suffolk University Margin of error: ± 4.9% Sample size: 400	August 21–24, 2014	Chris Christie; 11%	Paul Ryan; 11%	Jeb Bush; 10.75%	Rand Paul 10.5%, Mike Huckabee 7%, Scott Walker 6.75%, Marco Rubio 5.75%, Rick Perry 4.75%, Ted Cruz 4.25%, Bobby Jindal 3.5%, Rick Santorum 2.75%, Jon Huntsman Jr. 1.75%, John Kasich 1%, Undecided 18.25%, Other 0.5%, Refused 0.5%
Suffolk University Margin of error: ± 4.9% Sample size: 400	August 21–24, 2014	Mitt Romney; 48.62%	Chris Christie 7.69%	Paul Ryan 5.54%	Jeb Bush 5.23%, Ted Cruz 3.69%, Jon Huntsman Jr. 3.38%, Bobby Jindal 3.38%, Rand Paul 3.38%, Scott Walker 3.38%, Mike Huckabee 3.08%, Marco Rubio 2.77%, Rick Perry 1.54%, John Kasich 1.23%, Rick Santorum 1.23%, Undecided 4.92%, Refused 0.92%

== Analysis ==
Massachusetts was Trump's best Super Tuesday state. According to exit polls by Edison Research, Trump's base were white non-college voters, whom he swept with 63% of the vote in a five-way contest.

According to Pew Research, Massachusetts has the lowest percentage of Evangelicals of any Super Tuesday contest, but the highest percentage of Catholics.

Aside from a few Kasich-voting towns in the Boston Metro, Trump swept every town in the state.

== Results ==
=== Results by county ===
Donald Trump won a majority or plurality of the vote in every county in Massachusetts.

County	Trump	Kasich	Rubio	Cruz
Barnstable	17,227	5,889	5,248	2,897
Berkshire	3,418	1,303	1,521	1,010
Bristol	25,685	6,048	7,640	4,794
Dukes	692	283	214	137
Essex	43,629	14,779	14,037	7,381
Franklin	2,409	1,359	1,038	597
Hampden	18,700	6,350	5,847	4,636
Hampshire	5,345	2,440	1,936	1,297
Middlesex	69,588	30,515	28,750	12,949
Nantucket	484	149	176	100
Norfolk	35,540	15,838	15,398	6,511
Plymouth	34,849	10,523	10,237	6,018
Suffolk	12,995	5,633	6,031	2,176
Worcester	41,864	13,325	15,097	10,089
Total	312,425	114,434	113,170	60,592

== See also ==
- 2016 Massachusetts Democratic primary
