= Senator Reagan (disambiguation) =

John Henninger Reagan (1818–1905) was a U.S. Senator from Texas from 1887 to 1891. Senator Reagan may also refer to:

- John Reagan (New Hampshire politician) (born 1946), New Hampshire State Senate
- Michele Reagan (born 1969), Arizona State Senate

== See also ==
- Senator Regan (disambiguation)
