= 2016 New Hampshire Democratic presidential primary =

- February 9, 2016

32 Democratic National Convention delegates (24 pledged, 8 unpledged)

Candidate	Bernie Sanders	Hillary Clinton
Home state	Vermont	New York
Delegate count	15	9
Popular vote	152,193	95,355
Percentage	60.14%	37.68%
- Sanders: 40–50% 50–60% 60–70% 70–80% 80–90% >90% Clinton: 50–60% 60–70% No Vote

The 2016 New Hampshire Democratic presidential primary was held on Tuesday February 9. As per tradition, it was the first primary and second nominating contest overall to take place in the cycle.

Bernie Sanders delivered a stinging defeat to Hillary Clinton in New Hampshire, sweeping all demographic cohorts but dominating among voters without a college degree, younger voters and lower-income voters. Sanders claimed 15 delegates to Clinton's 9.

It occurred on the same day as the Republican primary.

== Debates and forums ==
=== December 2015 debate in Goffstown ===
On December 19, 2015, the Democratic Party held their third debate at St. Anselm College in Goffstown, New Hampshire. Hosted by "World News Tonight" anchor David Muir and Chief Global Affairs Correspondent Martha Raddatz, it aired on ABC News. Before the debate, WMUR-TV's co-sponsorship had been revoked by the DNC due to a labor dispute. Participants were Hillary Clinton, Bernie Sanders, and Martin O'Malley.

The topics covered during the debate included Sanders' campaign's breach of Clinton's campaign data, strategy for defeating ISIS, gun control, the issue of whether to depose President Assad of Syria, if Wall Street favored each candidate, stability in the Middle East enforced by dictators and whether regime change was necessary, and the role of the First Spouse.

=== February 2016 forum in Derry ===
A fifth forum, a Town Hall event, was held on February 3, 2016, in Derry, New Hampshire. It aired on CNN.

=== Lesser known candidates forum at Goffstown ===
One of the highlights of the campaign is when the non-recognized candidates gather together to introduce themselves to the public at this event, which first was held in 1972.

Due to the notorious glitter-bombing incident of the previous cycle, Vermin Supreme was pointedly dis-invited, but showed up anyway, and made the national news. Eighteen people showed up: Jon Adams, Eric Elbot, Rocky De La Fuente, Mark Greenstein, Henry Hewes, William McGaughey, Edward O'Donnell, Graham Schwass, Sam Sloan, Edward Sonnino, Michael Steinberg, and several others.

=== February 2016 debate in Durham ===
Unlike in previous years, initially, only a single authorized debate was scheduled to be held in New Hampshire. Initially planned as an unsanctioned debate, a debate on February 4 in Durham, New Hampshire was however later confirmed by the DNC. Hosted by Chuck Todd and Rachel Maddow, it was broadcast by NBC News. While Hillary Clinton, Bernie Sanders, and Martin O'Malley all confirmed their participation, O'Malley eventually came to suspend his campaign prior to the debate.

Commentators of the debate cited the elevated discourse between the candidates. There was discussion on the death penalty (federal versus state), money in politics, and assessing Iran, North Korea and Russia as threats to national security. Clinton demanded that Sanders explain his "artful smears" of Clinton receiving campaign donations. Sanders responded by critiquing the inherently "quid-pro-quo" nature of Wall Street campaign donations. The exchange between the two candidates was called by Eric Levitz one of the best 10-minute exchanges in the history of American political debates.

== Candidates ==
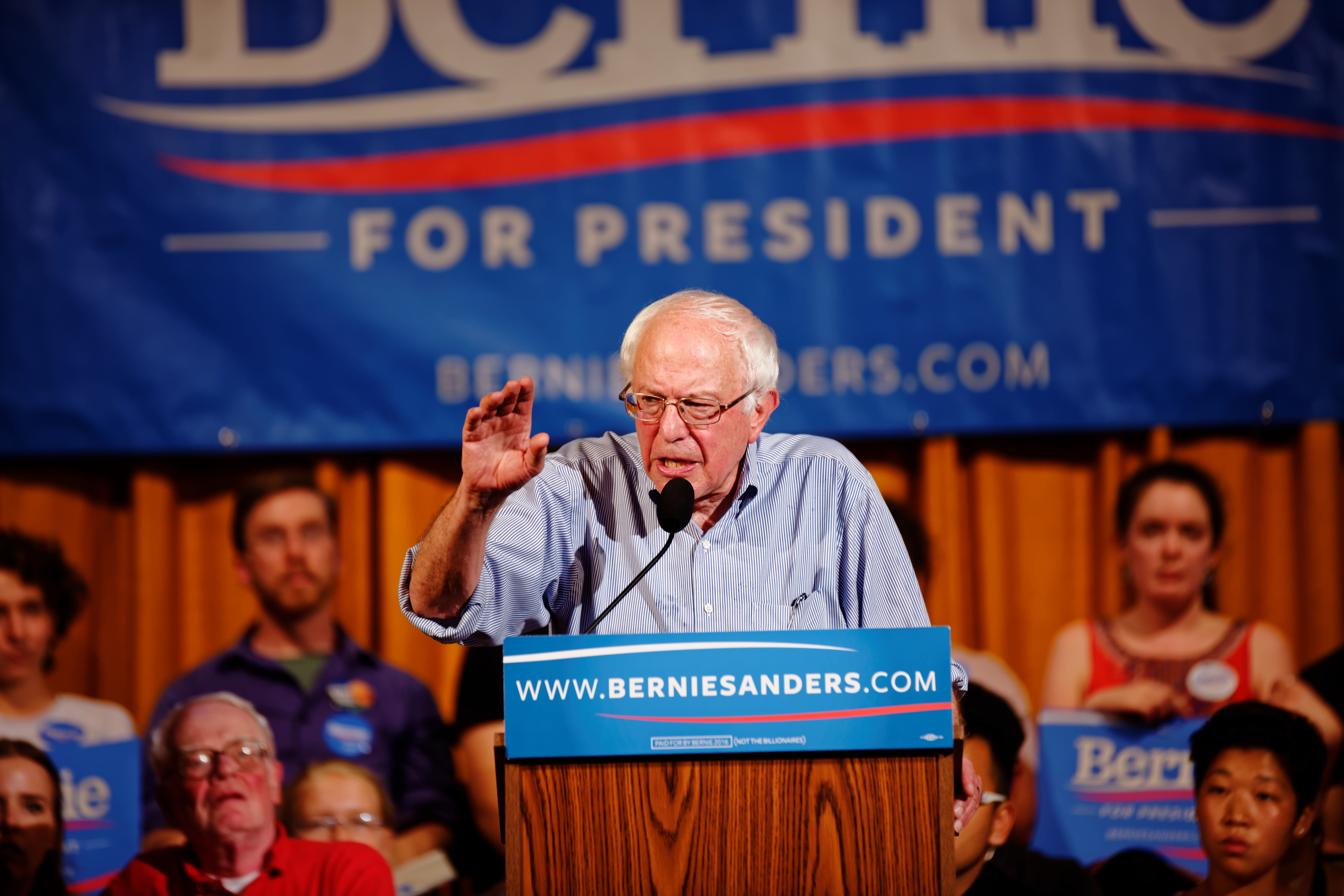
Bernie Sanders in Littleton, New Hampshire, on August 24, 2015

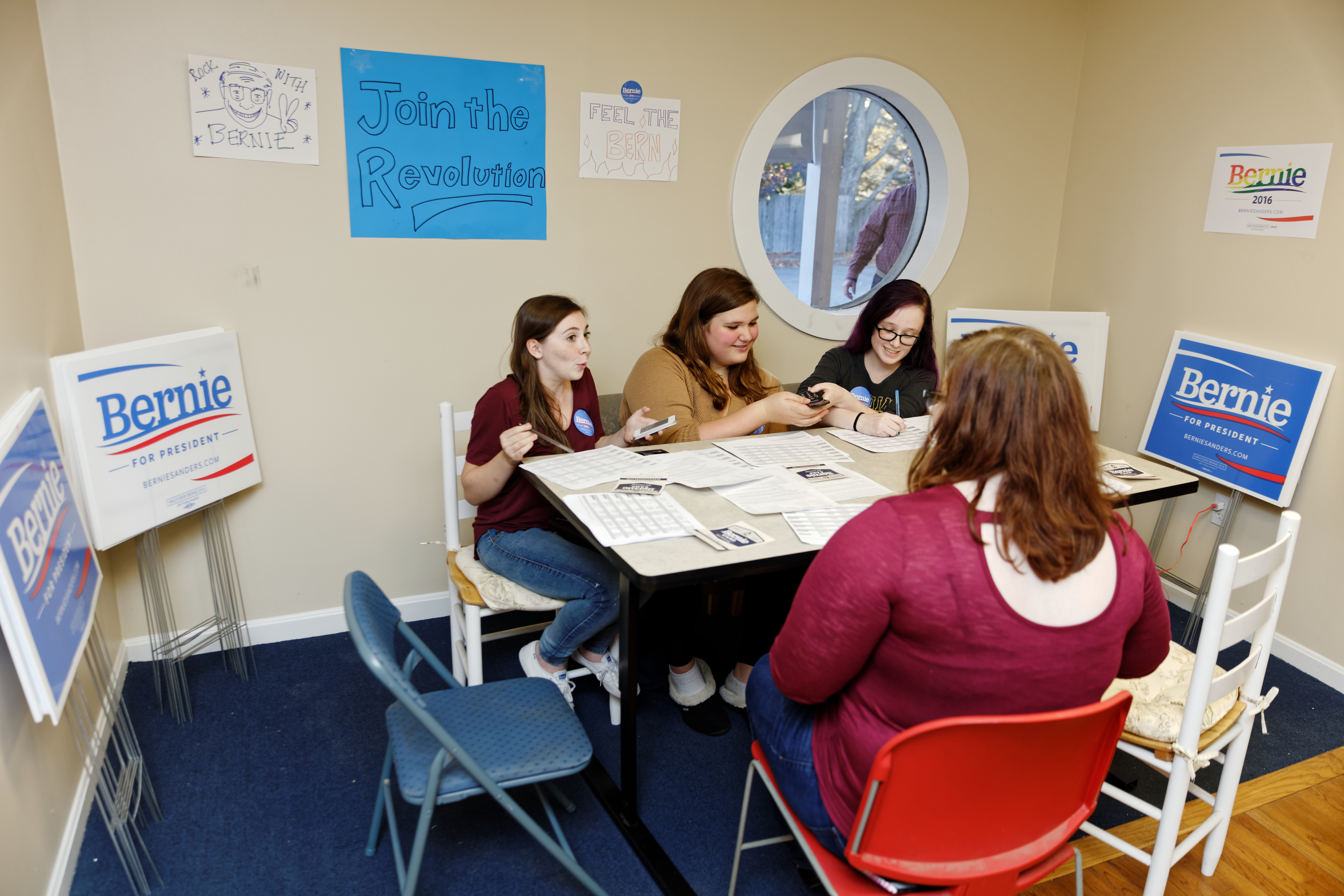
Bernie Sanders Campaign Field Office In Nashua, New Hampshire.

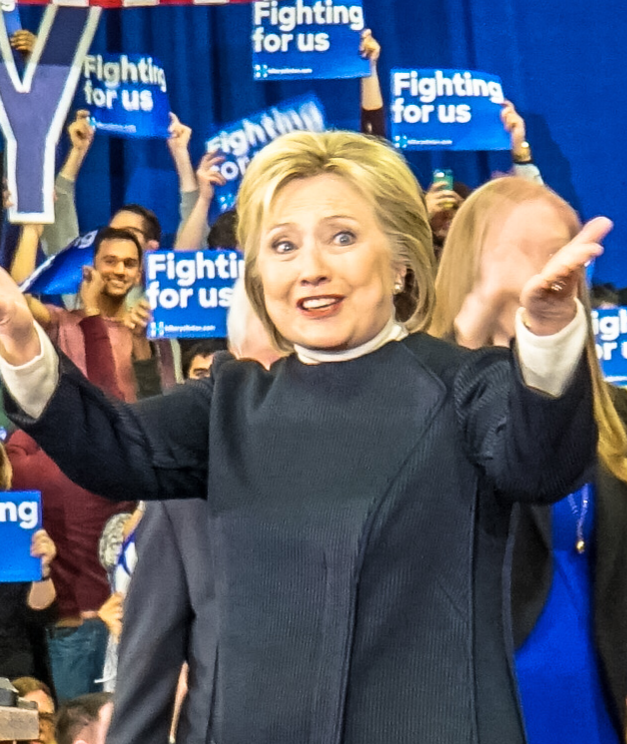
Hillary Clinton at a rally following the 2016 Democratic primary.

This is a list of the candidates on the ballot in the New Hampshire primary.

The following notable candidates had participated in all authorized debates:

- Hillary Clinton of New York (campaign), United States Secretary of State (2009–2013), presidential candidate in 2008, United States Senator from New York (2001–2009), First Lady of the United States (1993–2001)
- Bernie Sanders of Vermont (campaign), United States Senator from Vermont (2007–present), United States Representative from Vermont (1991–2007), Mayor of Burlington (1981–1989)
- Martin O'Malley of Maryland (campaign), Governor of Maryland (2007–2015), Mayor of Baltimore (1999–2007). By this time, O'Malley had withdrawn from the race.

The following candidates have not been invited to any major debates or listed in national polls, but were notable enough to have Wikipedia articles written about them:

- Rocky De La Fuente of California, businessman
- Keith Russell Judd of Texas, perennial candidate
- Sam Sloan of New York, former chess administrator and 2012 Libertarian Party candidate
- Vermin Supreme of Massachusetts, performance artist and perennial candidate
- John Wolfe, Jr. of Tennessee, attorney, Democratic Party nominee for U.S. House of Representatives for Tennessee's 3rd congressional district, 2002, 2004, 2010

In addition to appearing on the New Hampshire primary ballot, the following candidates were on the primary ballot in one or more other state(s):

- Steve Burke, former St. Lawrence County Democratic Committee Chair
- Henry Hewes
- Michael Steinberg, lawyer, candidate U.S. House of Representatives 2006
- Star Locke of Texas, rancher
- James Valentine of Virginia, political philosopher

The following were not listed on the primary ballot in any state(s) other than New Hampshire:

- Jon Adams of New York
- Eric Elbot of Massachusetts
- Bill French of Pennsylvania
- Mark Stewart Greenstein of Connecticut
- Brock C. Hutton of Maryland
- Lloyd Kelso of North Carolina
- Steven Roy Lipscomb of New Mexico
- Robert Lovitt of Kentucky
- William H. McGaughey, Jr. of Minnesota
- Raymond Michael Moroz of New York
- Edward T. O'Donnell, Jr.
- Edward Sonnino
- Graham Schwass
- David John Thistle of New Hampshire
- Richard Lyons Weil of Colorado

== Opinion polling ==
Poll source	Date	1st	2nd	3rd	Other
Official Primary results	February 9, 2016	Bernie Sanders; 60.1%	Hillary Clinton; 37.7%		Others / Uncommitted; 2.2%
American Research Group; Margin of error: ± 5% Sample size: 408	February 6–7, 2016	Bernie Sanders; 53%	Hillary Clinton; 41%		Undecided; 6%
University of Massachusetts-Lowell/7 News survey Margin of error: ± 5.38% Sample size: 428	February 4–6, 2016	Bernie Sanders; 57%	Hillary Clinton; 40%		Others / Undecided; 3%
University of Massachusetts-Lowell/7 News survey Margin of error: ± 5.3% Sample size: 442	January 29–31, 2016	Bernie Sanders; 61%	Hillary Clinton; 30%	Martin O'Malley; 1%	Undecided 6%
CNN/WMUR; Margin of error: ± 5.3% Sample size: 347	January 27–30, 2016	Bernie Sanders; 57%	Hillary Clinton; 34%	Martin O'Malley; 1%	Other, Undecided, or Not Committed 9%
Emerson College Margin of error ± 5.2% Sample Size: 350	January 25–26, 2016	Bernie Sanders; 52%	Hillary Clinton; 44%	Martin O'Malley; 3%	Other 1%
American Research Group Margin of error ± 4% Sample Size: 396	January 23–25, 2016	Bernie Sanders; 49%	Hillary Clinton; 42%	Martin O'Malley; 3%	Other 6%
Franklin Pierce University/Boston Herald Margin of error ± 4.9% Sample Size: 408	January 20–24, 2016	Bernie Sanders; 55%	Hillary Clinton; 39%	Martin O'Malley; 2%	Other 5%
Fox News Margin of error ± 4.5% Sample Size: 400	January 18–21, 2016	Bernie Sanders; 56%	Hillary Clinton; 34%	Martin O'Malley; 3%	Other 7%
CBS News/YouGov Margin of error ± 6.2% Sample Size:	January 18–21, 2016	Bernie Sanders; 57%	Hillary Clinton; 38%	Martin O'Malley; 5%	No preference 0%
Suffolk University Margin of error – Sample Size: 500	January 17–21, 2016	Bernie Sanders; 50%	Hillary Clinton; 41%	Martin O'Malley; 2%	Other/Undecided 7%
American Research Group Margin of error ± 4% Sample Size: 600	January 15–18, 2016	Bernie Sanders; 49%	Hillary Clinton; 43%	Martin O'Malley; 3%	Undecided 5%
Gravis Marketing Margin of error ± 4.5% Sample Size: 472	January 15–18, 2016	Bernie Sanders; 46%	Hillary Clinton; 43%	Martin O'Malley; 2%	Undecided 8%
CNN and WMUR Margin of error ± 4.8% Sample Size: 420	January 13–18, 2016	Bernie Sanders; 60%	Hillary Clinton; 33%	Martin O'Malley; 1%	Undecided 6%
Monmouth University Poll Margin of error ± 4.8% Sample Size: 413	January 7–10, 2016	Bernie Sanders; 53%	Hillary Clinton; 39%	Martin O'Malley; 5%	Undecided 3%
Fox News Margin of error ± 5% Sample Size: 386	January 4–7, 2016	Bernie Sanders; 50%	Hillary Clinton; 37%	Martin O'Malley; 3%	Other 2%, None of the above 5%, Don't know 3%
NBC News/WSJ/Marist Margin of error: ± 4.8% Sample size: 425	January 2–7, 2016	Bernie Sanders; 50%	Hillary Clinton; 46%	Martin O'Malley; 1%	

Polls in 2015

Poll source	Date	1st	2nd	3rd	Other
American Research Group Margin of error ± 4% Sample Size: 600	December 20–22, 2015	Hillary Clinton; 46%	Bernie Sanders; 43%	Martin O'Malley; 3%	Other <0.5%, Undecided 7%
YouGov/CBS News Margin of error ± 5.7% Sample Size: 1091	December 14–17, 2015	Bernie Sanders; 56%	Hillary Clinton; 42%	Martin O'Malley; 1%	No preference 1%
Boston Herald Margin of error ± 4.8% Sample Size: 410	December 13–17, 2015	Bernie Sanders; 48%	Hillary Clinton; 46%	Martin O'Malley; 2%	Undecided 4%
CNN and WMUR Margin of error: ± 5.1% Sample size: 370	November 30 – December 7, 2015	Bernie Sanders; 50%	Hillary Clinton; 40%	Martin O'Malley; 1%	Someone Else/Not Sure 6%
Public Policy Polling Margin of error: ± 4.6% Sample size: 458	November 30 – December 2, 2015	Hillary Clinton; 44%	Bernie Sanders; 42%	Martin O'Malley; 8%	Someone Else/Not Sure 7%
YouGov/CBS News Margin of error: ± 5.2% Sample size: 561	November 15–19, 2015	Bernie Sanders; 52%	Hillary Clinton; 45%	Martin O'Malley 3%	Undecided 0%
Fox News Margin of error: ± 3.5% Sample size: 804	November 15–17, 2015	Bernie Sanders; 45%	Hillary Clinton; 44%	Martin O'Malley 5%	None 1%, Don't Know 5%
Gravis Marketing Margin of error: ± 6.7% Sample size: 214	November 11, 2015	Hillary Clinton; 46%	Bernie Sanders; 25%	Martin O'Malley; 3%	Unsure 26%
Monmouth University Polling Institute Margin of error: ± 4.9% Sample size: 403	October 29 – November 1, 2015	Hillary Clinton; 48%	Bernie Sanders; 45%	Martin O'Malley; 3%	Lawrence Lessig 1%
YouGov/CBS News Margin of error: ± 7.1% Sample size: 499	October 15–22, 2015	Bernie Sanders; 54%	Hillary Clinton; 39%	Martin O'Malley 3%	Lincoln Chafee 0%, Lawrence Lessig 0%, No preference 3%
Public Policy Polling Margin of error: ± 4.9% Sample size: 393	October 16–18, 2015	Hillary Clinton; 41%	Bernie Sanders; 33%	Joe Biden; 11%	Martin O'Malley 4%, Lincoln Chafee 2%, Jim Webb 2%, Lawrence Lessig 0%, Not Sure 7%
Bloomberg/San Anselm Poll Margin of error: ± 4.9% Sample size: 400	October 15–18, 2015	Bernie Sanders; 41%	Hillary Clinton; 36%	Joe Biden; 10%	Jim Webb 1%, Lawrence Lessig 1%, Someone Else 1%, None of the Above 2%, Not Sure 8%
Franklin Pierce-Herald Margin of error: ± 4.9% Sample size: 403	October 14–17, 2015	Bernie Sanders; 38%	Hillary Clinton; 30%	Joe Biden; 19%	Jim Webb 1%, Martin O'Malley 1%, Lincoln Chafee 1%
Boston Globe/Suffolk University Margin of error: ± 4.4% Sample size: 500	October 14–15, 2015	Hillary Clinton; 36.8%	Bernie Sanders; 35.4%	Joe Biden; 11.2%	Jim Webb 2.6%, Martin O'Malley 1.4%, Lincoln Chafee 0.6%, Lawrence Lessig 0.2%, Undecided 11.6%
Gravis Marketing Margin of error: ± 5.1% Sample size: 373	October 5–6, 2015	Bernie Sanders; 32.8%	Hillary Clinton; 30.2%	Joe Biden; 10.6%	Martin O'Malley 1.5%, Jim Webb 0.7%, Lincoln Chafee 0.8%, Undecided 23.3%
NBC News/WSJ/Marist Margin of error: ± 4.9% Sample size: 404	September 23–30, 2015	Bernie Sanders; 42%	Hillary Clinton; 28%	Joe Biden; 18%	Martin O'Malley 2%, Jim Webb 1%, Lincoln Chafee 1%, Undecided 9%
NBC News/WSJ/Marist Margin of error: ± 4.9% Sample size: 404	September 23–30, 2015	Bernie Sanders; 48%	Hillary Clinton; 39%	Lincoln Chafee 2%	Martin O'Malley 2%, Jim Webb 1%, Undecided 9%
UNH/WMUR Margin of error: ± 5.5% Sample size: 314	September 17–23, 2015	Bernie Sanders; 46%	Hillary Clinton; 30%	Joe Biden; 14%	Martin O'Malley 2%, Jim Webb 1%, Lincoln Chafee 0%, Someone else 1%, Don't Know Yet 6%
MassINC/WBUR/NPR Margin of error: ± 4.9% Sample size: 404	September 12–15, 2015	Bernie Sanders; 35%	Hillary Clinton; 31%	Joe Biden; 14%	Jim Webb 2%, Martin O'Malley 1%, Lincoln Chafee 1%, Did not know/refused 10%, Some other candidate 4%, Would not vote 2%
Monmouth University Margin of error: ± 4.9% Sample size: 400	September 10–13, 2015	Bernie Sanders; 43%	Hillary Clinton; 36%	Joe Biden; 13%	Martin O'Malley 2%, Lincoln Chafee 1%, Jim Webb 1%, Lawrence Lessig 1%, other 1%, undecided 3%
YouGov/CBS News Margin of error: ± 7.4% Sample size: 548	September 3–10, 2015	Bernie Sanders; 52%	Hillary Clinton; 30%	Joe Biden; 9%	Martin O'Malley 1%, Lincoln Chafee 0%, Jim Webb 0%, No preference 8%
NBC News/Marist Poll Margin of error: ± 5.2% Sample size: 356	Published September 6, 2015	Bernie Sanders; 41%	Hillary Clinton; 32%	Joe Biden; 16%	Jim Webb 1%, Martin O'Malley 1%, Lincoln Chafee <1%, Undecided 8%
NBC News/Marist Poll Margin of error: ± 5.2% Sample size: 356	Published September 6, 2015	Bernie Sanders; 49%	Hillary Clinton; 38%	Jim Webb; 2%	Lincoln Chafee 1%, Martin O'Malley 1%, Undecided 8%
Public Policy Polling Margin of error: ± 5.1% Sample size: 370	August 21–24, 2015	Bernie Sanders; 42%	Hillary Clinton; 35%	Jim Webb; 6%	Martin O'Malley 4%, Lincoln Chafee 2%, Lawrence Lessig 1%, Not sure 10%
Franklin Pierce University/Boston Herald Margin of error: ± 4.7% Sample size: 442	August 7–10, 2015	Bernie Sanders; 44%	Hillary Clinton; 37%	Joe Biden; 9%	Jim Webb 1%, Martin O'Malley <1%, Lincoln Chafee <1%, Other/Not sure 9%
Gravis Marketing/One; America News Margin of error: ± 4.5% Sample size: 475	July 31 – August 3, 2015	Hillary Clinton; 43%	Bernie Sanders; 39%	Elizabeth Warren; 8%	Joe Biden 6%, Martin O'Malley 2%, Jim Webb 2%, Lincoln Chafee 0%
UNH/WMUR Margin of error: ± 5.9% Sample size: 276	July 22–30, 2015	Hillary Clinton; 42%	Bernie Sanders; 36%	Joe Biden; 5%	Martin O'Malley 1%, Jim Webb 1%, Lincoln Chafee 0%, Someone else 3%, Don't Know Yet 12%
NBC News/Marist Margin of error: ± 5.4% Sample size: 329	July 14–21, 2015	Hillary Clinton; 42%	Bernie Sanders; 32%	Joe Biden; 12%	Martin O'Malley 3%, Lincoln Chafee 2%, Jim Webb 1%, Undecided 10%
CNN/WMUR Margin of error: ± 5.2% Sample size: 360	June 18–24, 2015	Hillary Clinton; 43%	Bernie Sanders; 35%	Joe Biden; 8%	Martin O'Malley 2%, Jim Webb 1%, Lincoln Chafee 0%, Someone else 2%, Not sure 9%
Bloomberg/Saint Anselm Margin of error: ± 4.9% Sample size: 400	June 19–22, 2015	Hillary Clinton; 56%	Bernie Sanders; 24%	Martin O'Malley; 2%	Lincoln Chafee 1%, None of the above 4%, Not sure 12%
Suffolk Margin of error: ± 4.4% Sample size: 500	June 11–15, 2015	Hillary Clinton; 41%	Bernie Sanders; 31%	Joe Biden; 7%	Martin O'Malley 3%, Lincoln Chafee 1%, Jim Webb 1%, Other 0%, Undecided 15%
Morning Consult Margin of error: ± 6% Sample size: 279	May 31 – June 8, 2015	Hillary Clinton; 44%	Bernie Sanders; 32%	Joe Biden; 8%	Martin O'Malley 2%, Jim Webb 1%, Lincoln Chafee 0%, Someone else 0%, Don't know/no opinion 11%
Purple Strategies Margin of error: ± 4.9% Sample size: 400	May 2–6, 2015	Hillary Clinton; 62%	Bernie Sanders; 18%	Joe Biden; 5%	Martin O'Malley 3%, Lincoln Chafee 1%, Jim Webb 1%, Someone else 0%, None of the above 3%, Not sure 8%
UNH/WMUR Margin of error: ± 6.5% Sample size: 229	April 24 – May 3, 2015	Hillary Clinton; 51%	Elizabeth Warren; 20%	Bernie Sanders; 13%	Andrew Cuomo 3%, Joe Biden 2%, Lincoln Chafee 1%, Martin O'Malley 1%, Jim Webb 1%, Undecided 8%
Gravis Marketing Margin of error: ± 5% Sample size: 369	April 21–22, 2015	Hillary Clinton; 45%	Elizabeth Warren; 24%	Bernie Sanders; 12%	Joe Biden 7%, Martin O'Malley 4%, Lincoln Chafee 2%, Jim Webb 2%, Bill de Blasio 0.4%, Undecided 5%
Gravis Marketing Margin of error: ± 5% Sample size: 369	April 21–22, 2015	Hillary Clinton; 54%	Bernie Sanders; 19%	Joe Biden; 10%	Martin O'Malley 5%, Jim Webb 4%, Lincoln Chafee 2%, Bill de Blasio 1%, Undecided 6%
Public Policy Polling Margin of error: ± 5.4% Sample size: 329	April 9–13, 2015	Hillary Clinton; 45%	Elizabeth Warren; 23%	Bernie Sanders; 12%	Joe Biden 7%, Martin O'Malley 3%, Lincoln Chafee 1%, Jim Webb 1%, Other/Undecided 9%
Franklin Pierce University/Boston Herald Margin of error: ± 4.7% Sample size: 417	March 22–25, 2015	Hillary Clinton; 47%	Elizabeth Warren; 22%	Joe Biden; 10%	Bernie Sanders 8%, Andrew Cuomo 4%, Martin O'Malley 1%, Jim Webb <1%, Other 3%, Unsure 5%
Franklin Pierce University/Boston Herald Margin of error: ± 4.7% Sample size: 417	March 22–25, 2015	Hillary Clinton; 41%	Elizabeth Warren; 20%	Al Gore; 16%	Joe Biden 7%, Bernie Sanders 6%, Andrew Cuomo 1%, Martin O'Malley <1%, Jim Webb <1%, Other 2%, Unsure 6%
Gravis Marketing Margin of error: ± 5% Sample size: 427	March 18–19, 2015	Hillary Clinton; 49%	Elizabeth Warren; 20%	Bernie Sanders; 12%	Joe Biden 5%, Martin O'Malley 2%, Jim Webb 2%, Unsure 10%
NBC News/Marist Margin of error: ± 5.6% Sample size: 309	February 3–10, 2015	Hillary Clinton; 69%	Bernie Sanders; 13%	Joe Biden; 8%	Jim Webb 2%, Martin O'Malley <1%, Undecided 7%
Purple Strategies Margin of error: ± 4.9% Sample size: 400	January 31 – February 5, 2015	Hillary Clinton; 56%	Elizabeth Warren; 15%	Joe Biden; 8%	Bernie Sanders 8%, Martin O'Malley 0%, Jim Webb 0%, Someone else 0%, None of the above 2%, Not sure 11%
Gravis Marketing Margin of error: ± 5% Sample size: 384	February 2–3, 2015	Hillary Clinton; 44%	Elizabeth Warren; 25%	Bernie Sanders; 13%	Joe Biden 5%, Martin O'Malley 1%, Jim Webb 1%, Unsure 10%
UNH/WMUR Margin of error: ± 5.7% Sample size: 297	January 22 – February 3, 2015	Hillary Clinton; 58%	Elizabeth Warren; 14%	Joe Biden; 8%	Bernie Sanders 6%, Andrew Cuomo 2%, Martin O'Malley 1%, Jim Webb 1%, Someone else 1%, Don't know yet 9%

Polls in 2014

Poll source	Date	1st	2nd	3rd	Other
Purple Insights Margin of error: ± 4.9% Sample size: 404	November 12–18, 2014	Hillary Clinton; 62%	Elizabeth Warren; 13%	Bernie Sanders; 6%	Joe Biden 5%, Deval Patrick 2%, Martin O'Malley 1%, Someone else 0%, None of the above 2%, Not sure 8%
New England College Margin of error: ± 4.06% Sample size: 583	October 31 – November 1, 2014	Hillary Clinton; 53.1%	Elizabeth Warren; 16.8%	Bernie Sanders; 7%	Joe Biden 5.8%, Martin O'Malley 2.3%, Deval Patrick 1.4%, Andrew Cuomo 1.2%, Kirsten Gillibrand 1.2%, Mark Warner 1.2%, Other 10%
UMass Amherst Margin of error: ± ? Sample size: 204	October 10–15, 2014	Hillary Clinton; 49%	Elizabeth Warren; 16%	Bernie Sanders; 11%	Joe Biden 6%, Andrew Cuomo 3%, Deval Patrick 3%, Martin O'Malley <1%, Cory Booker <1%, Other 11%
WMUR/UNH Margin of error: ± 5.9% Sample size: 275	September 29 – October 5, 2014	Hillary Clinton; 58%	Elizabeth Warren; 18%	Joe Biden; 3%	Martin O'Malley 3%, Bernie Sanders 3%, Andrew Cuomo 1%, Mark Warner <1%, Other 1%, Undecided 13%
CNN/ORC Margin of error: ± 5.5% Sample size: 334	September 8–11, 2014	Hillary Clinton; 60%	Elizabeth Warren; 11%	Joe Biden; 8%	Bernie Sanders 7%, Deval Patrick 4%, Andrew Cuomo 1%, Martin O'Malley 1%, Other 1%, None/No one 2%, No opinion 6%
NBC News/Marist Margin of error: ± 4.5% Sample size: 479	July 7–13, 2014	Hillary Clinton; 74%	Joe Biden; 18%	Undecided 8%	
WMUR/UNH Margin of error: ± 6.1% Sample size: 257	June 19 – July 1, 2014	Hillary Clinton; 59%	Joe Biden; 14%	Elizabeth Warren; 8%	Bernie Sanders 5%, Andrew Cuomo 3%, Mark Warner 1%, Martin O'Malley 0%, Brian Schweitzer 0%, Other 1%, Undecided 9%
WMUR/UNH Margin of error: ± 7.2% Sample size: 184	April 1–9, 2014	Hillary Clinton; 65%	Joe Biden; 6%	Andrew Cuomo; 4%	Mark Warner 2%, Martin O'Malley 0%, Brian Schweitzer 0%, Other 5%, Undecided 18%
WMUR/UNH Margin of error: ± 6.2% Sample size: 252	January 21–26, 2014	Hillary Clinton; 74%	Joe Biden; 10%	Andrew Cuomo; 2%	Mark Warner 1%, Martin O'Malley <1%, Brian Schweitzer <1%, Kirsten Gillibrand 0%, Other 2%, Undecided 10%
Purple Strategies Margin of error: ± 5.4% Sample size: 334	January 21–23, 2014	Hillary Clinton; 68%	Elizabeth Warren; 13%	Joe Biden; 6%	Deval Patrick 2%, Martin O'Malley 1%, Other 2%, None 1%, Undecided 5%
Public Policy Polling Margin of error: ± 4.4% Sample size: 502	January 9–12, 2014	Hillary Clinton; 65%	Joe Biden; 10%	Elizabeth Warren; 8%	Andrew Cuomo 3%, Cory Booker 2%, Kirsten Gillibrand 1%, Martin O'Malley 1%, Brian Schweitzer 0%, Mark Warner 0%, Someone else/Not sure 9%
Public Policy Polling Margin of error: ± 4.4% Sample size: 502	January 9–12, 2014	Joe Biden; 32%	Elizabeth Warren; 21%	Andrew Cuomo; 9%	Cory Booker 4%, Kirsten Gillibrand 4%, Martin O'Malley 2%, Brian Schweitzer 1%, Mark Warner 1%, Someone else/Not sure 26%
Public Policy Polling Margin of error: ± 4.4% Sample size: 502	January 9–12, 2014	Elizabeth Warren; 30%	Andrew Cuomo; 19%	Cory Booker; 9%	Martin O'Malley 5%, Kirsten Gillibrand 4%, Brian Schweitzer 2%, Mark Warner 2%, Someone else/Not sure 28%

Polls in 2013

Poll source	Date	1st	2nd	3rd	Other
WMUR/UNH Margin of error: ± 6.2% Sample size: 252	October 7–16, 2013	Hillary Clinton; 64%	Joe Biden; 6%	Elizabeth Warren; 6%	Andrew Cuomo 2%, Deval Patrick 1%, Evan Bayh <1%, Cory Booker <1%, Martin O'Malley <1%, Mark Warner <1%, Kirsten Gillibrand 0%, John Hickenlooper 0%, Other 2%, Unsure 18%
Public Policy Polling Margin of error: ± 4.6% Sample size: 455	September 13–16, 2013	Hillary Clinton; 57%	Joe Biden; 12%	Elizabeth Warren; 11%	Cory Booker 4%, Andrew Cuomo 2%, Kirsten Gillibrand 1%, Mark Warner 1%, Martin O'Malley 0%, Brian Schweitzer 0%, Someone else/Not sure 11%
Public Policy Polling Margin of error: ± 4.6% Sample size: 455	September 13–16, 2013	Joe Biden; 36%	Elizabeth Warren; 20%	Cory Booker; 9%	Andrew Cuomo 7%, Kirsten Gillibrand 1%, Martin O'Malley 1%, Brian Schweitzer 1%, Mark Warner 1%, Someone else/Not sure 23%
Public Policy Polling Margin of error: ± 4.6% Sample size: 455	September 13–16, 2013	Elizabeth Warren; 33%	Andrew Cuomo; 14%	Cory Booker; 12%	Kirsten Gillibrand 5%, Martin O'Malley 4%, Mark Warner 2%, Brian Schweitzer 1%, Someone else/Not sure 30%
WMUR/UNH Margin of error: ± 7.1% Sample size: 190	July 18–29, 2013	Hillary Clinton; 62%	Joe Biden; 8%	Deval Patrick; 5%	Cory Booker 2%, Andrew Cuomo 1%, Evan Bayh <1%, Kirsten Gillibrand <1%, John Hickenlooper <1%, Martin O'Malley 0%, Mark Warner 0%, Other 2%, Unsure 19%
New England College Margin of error: ± 5.37% Sample size: 333	July, 2013	Hillary Clinton; 65%	Joe Biden; 8%	Jeanne Shaheen; 6%	Andrew Cuomo 1.5%, Martin O'Malley 0.6%, Unsure 19%
New England College Margin of error: ± 5.5% Sample size: 314	May, 2013	Hillary Clinton; 65%	Joe Biden; 10%	Elizabeth Warren; 5%	Andrew Cuomo 4%, Deval Patrick 3%, Martin O'Malley 0%, Unsure 13%
Public Policy Polling Margin of error: ± 5.1% Sample size: 368	April 19–21, 2013	Hillary Clinton; 68%	Joe Biden; 12%	Elizabeth Warren; 5%	Andrew Cuomo 3%, Deval Patrick 2%, Kirsten Gillibrand 1%, Martin O'Malley 1%, Brian Schweitzer 0%, Mark Warner 0%, Someone Else/Undecided 9%
Public Policy Polling Margin of error: ± 5.1% Sample size: 368	April 19–21, 2013	Joe Biden; 44%	Elizabeth Warren; 12%	Andrew Cuomo; 9%	Deval Patrick 9%, Kirsten Gillibrand 2%, Martin O'Malley 1%, Brian Schweitzer 1%, Mark Warner 1%, Someone Else/Undecided 21%
Public Policy Polling Margin of error: ± 5.1% Sample size: 368	April 19–21, 2013	Andrew Cuomo; 23%	Elizabeth Warren; 22%	Deval Patrick; 17%	Kirsten Gillibrand 4%, Martin O'Malley 2%, Brian Schweitzer 1%, Mark Warner 1%, Someone Else/Undecided 30%
WMUR/UNH Margin of error: ± 7.1% Sample size: 188	April 4–9, 2013	Hillary Clinton; 61%	Joe Biden; 7%	Andrew Cuomo; 3%	Deval Patrick 3%, Mark Warner 2%, Evan Bayh 1%, Cory Booker 1%, John Hickenlooper 0%, Martin O'Malley 0%, Brian Schweitzer 0%, Antonio Villaraigosa 0%, Someone Else 2%, Undecided 22%
WMUR/UNH Margin of error: ± 7% Sample size: 201	Jan. 30–Feb. 5, 2013	Hillary Clinton; 63%	Joe Biden; 10%	Andrew Cuomo; 5%	Cory Booker 2%, Evan Bayh 1%, Deval Patrick 1%, Brian Schweitzer 1%, John Hickenlooper <1%, Martin O'Malley <1%, Antonio Villaraigosa <1%, Mark Warner <1%, Someone Else 1%, Undecided 16%

== Results ==
Municipal results of the New Hampshire Democratic primaries, 2016. Bernie Sanders Hillary Clinton Not reported (Note: The Associated Press did not report results from municipalities where there were five or fewer registered voters.)

New Hampshire Democratic primary, February 9, 2016
Candidate	Popular vote		Estimated delegates		
Candidate	Count	Of total	Pledged	Unpledged	Total
Bernie Sanders	152,193	60.14%	15	1	16
Hillary Clinton	95,355	37.68%	9	6	15
Martin O'Malley (withdrawn)	667	0.26%			
Vermin Supreme	268	0.11%			
David John Thistle	226	0.09%			
Graham Schwass	143	0.06%			
Steve Burke	108	0.04%			
Rocky De La Fuente	96	0.04%			
John Wolfe Jr.	54	0.02%			
Jon Adams	53	0.02%			
Lloyd Thomas Kelso	46	0.02%			
Keith Russell Judd	44	0.02%			
Eric Elbot	36	0.01%			
Star Locke	33	0.01%			
William D. French	29	0.01%			
Mark Stewart Greenstein	29	0.01%			
Edward T. O'Donnell	26	0.01%			
James Valentine	24	0.01%			
Robert Lovitt	22	0.01%			
Michael Steinberg	21	0.01%			
William H. McGaughey Jr.	19	0.01%			
Henry Hewes	18	0.01%			
Edward Sonnino	17	0.01%			
Steven Roy Lipscomb	15	0.01%			
Sam Sloan	15	0.01%			
Brock C. Hutton	14	0.01%			
Raymond Michael Moroz	8	0.00%			
Richard Lyons Weil	8	0.00%			
Write-ins (Note: The write-ins include 3,248 votes for these 11 Republican presidential candidates: Trump (1795), Kasich (438), Jeb Bush (263), Christie (216), Marco Rubio (203), Ted Cruz (162), Fiorina (99), Carson (52), Paul (12), Gilmore (6), Huckabee (2).)	3,475	1.37%			
Uncommitted	—N/a		0	1	1
Total	253,062	100%	24	8	32

=== Results by county ===
Sanders won every county.

County	Clinton	Votes	Sanders	Votes
Belknap	35.7%	3,490	61.3%	5,990
Carroll	36.0%	3,230	63.1%	5,655
Cheshire	29.0%	5,166	70.1%	12,471
Coös	35.0%	2,013	63.2%	3,637
Grafton	32.3%	6,918	66.6%	14,258
Hillsborough	41.3%	28,099	56.7%	38,646
Merrimack	39.8%	12,209	59.0%	18,076
Rockingham	41.6%	22,829	56.7%	31,080
Strafford	35.1%	8,801	63.2%	15,865
Sullivan	29.0%	2,497	68.5%	5,906

== Analysis ==
Sanders scored a landslide 22-point routing in the New Hampshire primary, thanks to what The New York Times described as a "harness [of] working-class fury" against the so-called "establishment" candidates like Hillary Clinton, in a state known for its rebellious electorate. Sanders' win was propelled by younger voters, whom he won 74–25, men whom he won 67–32, self-identified Independents whom he won 73–25, and white voters whom he won 61-37 and who comprised 91% of the Democratic electorate in New Hampshire. According to exit polls, a 53–45 majority of voters thought Clinton was not honest or trustworthy, while 89% said Sanders was honest. 61% of voters said they were dissatisfied or angry about the federal government. Sanders swept all income levels and educational attainment levels in New Hampshire, except those who made more than $200k per year.

Sanders swept all of the major cities, including Nashua, Dover, Concord, and Manchester. Sanders won along the seacoast 59–41, in the Manchester/Nashua area 54–44, in Concord/Ct. Valley 64–35, in the south 59–39, and in the north 65–33. Clinton only won three towns: Bedford, Millsfield, and Windham.

Sanders' landslide victory was a clear regression for Clinton from 2008, when she had narrowly beaten Barack Obama in the 2008 New Hampshire primary thanks to support from populous southern New Hampshire. Furthermore, Clinton's win in Iowa but loss in New Hampshire marked a reversal of the 2008 results, where Clinton had scored a "comeback victory" in NH after coming third in Iowa. Both Sanders' percentage of the vote and margin of victory are the largest in a Democratic New Hampshire primary since John F. Kennedy in 1960.

== See also ==
- 2016 New Hampshire Republican presidential primary
