= John Barnes Jr. =

American politician (born 1931)

John S. Barnes Jr.

Member of the New Hampshire Senate from the 17th district
- In office December 6, 2000 – December 5, 2012
- Preceded by: Mary E. Brown
- Succeeded by: John Reagan
- In office December 2, 1992 – December 2, 1998
- Preceded by: Gordon J. Humphrey
- Succeeded by: Mary E. Brown

Member of the New Hampshire House of Representatives from the Rockingham 6th district
- In office December 7, 1988 – December 2, 1992

Personal details
- Born: August 21, 1931 Arlington, Massachusetts, U.S.
- Died: January 11, 2024 (aged 92)
- Party: Republican
- Spouse: Frances
- Profession: Retired business owner

John (Jack) S. Barnes Jr. (August 21, 1931 – January 11, 2024) was an American politician who served in the New Hampshire Senate for the 17th district, from 1992 to 1998 and again from 2000 to 2012. A member of the Republican Party, he previously served as a member of the New Hampshire House of Representatives from 1988 until 1992.

Barnes served in the United States Army. Barnes won the New Hampshire primary for Vice President of the United States in 2008. The following year, he co-sponsored a bill which abolished the vice-presidential preference ballot. The bill passed both houses of the state legislature and took effect in 2012.

Barnes died in January 2024, at the age of 92.
