= Senator Regan =

Senator Regan may refer to:

- Kenneth M. Regan (1891–1959), Texas State Senate
- Mike Regan (politician) (born 1961), Pennsylvania State Senate

== See also ==
- Senator Reagan (disambiguation)
