= Bruce Hodgdon =

American politician

Member of the New Hampshire House of Representatives from the Rockingham 1st district
- In office December 5, 2012 – December 7, 2016
- Preceded by: John Reagan
- Succeeded by: Brian Stone

Personal details
- Party: Republican

Bruce Hodgdon served as a Republican member of the New Hampshire House of Representatives from 2013 until 2017 from Northwood. He was a member of the legislative committee on transportation.
