= 2016 Massachusetts Democratic presidential primary =

- March 1, 2016

| Candidate | Hillary Clinton | Bernie Sanders |
| Home state | New York | Vermont |
| Delegate count | 46 | 45 |
| Popular vote | 606,822 | 589,803 |
| Percentage | 49.73% | 48.33% |
- Clinton: 40-50% 50-60% 60-70% 70-80% Sanders: 40-50% 50-60% 60-70% 70-80%

The 2016 Massachusetts Democratic presidential primary took place on March 1 in the U.S. state of Massachusetts as one of the Democratic Party's primaries ahead of the 2016 presidential election.

On the same day, dubbed "Super Tuesday," Democratic primaries were held in ten other states plus American Samoa, while the Republican Party held primaries in eleven states including their own Massachusetts primary.

Clinton's win came from urban support in Boston and Springfield. She had the endorsement of then-Boston Mayor Marty Walsh, appearing with the Mayor at the Old South Meeting House in Boston the day before the primary.

== Opinion polling ==
| Poll source | Date | 1st | 2nd | 3rd | Other |
|---|---|---|---|---|---|
| Primary results | March 1, 2016 | Hillary Clinton; 49.7% | Bernie Sanders; 48.3% | | Others / Uncommitted; 2.0% |
| SurveyMonkey Margin of error: ± ? Sample size: 1,224 | February 22–29, 2016 | Hillary Clinton; 48% | Bernie Sanders; 46% | | Others / Undecided; 6% |
| Emerson College Margin of error: ± 3.7% Sample size: 670 | February 26–28, 2016 | Hillary Clinton; 54% | Bernie Sanders; 43% | | Others / Undecided; 3% |
| Suffolk University Margin of error: ± 4.4% Sample size: 500 | February 25–27, 2016 | Hillary Clinton; 50% | Bernie Sanders; 42% | | Others / Undecided; 8% |
| WBZ-UMass Amherst Margin of error: ± 6.5% Sample size: 400 | February 19–25, 2016 | Hillary Clinton; 47% | Bernie Sanders; 44% | | Others / Undecided; 9% |
| WBUR Margin of error: ± 4.9% Sample size: 418 | February 21–23, 2016 | Hillary Clinton; 49% | Bernie Sanders; 44% | | Others / Undecided; 7% |
| Emerson College Margin of error: ± 4.75% Sample size: 417 | February 19–21, 2016 | Hillary Clinton; 46% | Bernie Sanders; 46% | | Undecided 5% |
| Public Policy Polling Margin of error: ± 4.2; Sample Size: 538 | February 14–16, 2016 | Bernie Sanders; 49% | Hillary Clinton; 42% | | Undecided 9% |
| Emerson College Margin of error: ± 6.0% Sample size: 265 | October 16–18, 2015 | Hillary Clinton; 59% | Bernie Sanders; 25% | Jim Webb; 5% | Martin O'Malley 3%, Lincoln Chafee 3%, Other 2%, Undecided 3% |
| Emerson College Margin of error: ± ? Sample size: 430 | March 14–19, 2015 | Hillary Clinton; 43% | Elizabeth Warren; 16% | Joe Biden; 10% | Bernie Sanders 6%, Martin O'Malley 2%, Other/Undecided 24% |
| Gravis Marketing Margin of error: ± 4% Sample size: 358 | January 19–21, 2015 | Hillary Clinton; 46% | Elizabeth Warren; 22% | | Undecided 32% |
| Suffolk University Margin of error: ± 4.9% Sample size: 400 | August 21–24, 2014 | Hillary Clinton; 55% | Elizabeth Warren; 17.25% | Joe Biden; 7.75% | Andrew Cuomo 4.75%, Martin O'Malley 1.5%, Undecided 12.25%, Refused 1.25%, Other 0.25% |
| Public Policy Polling Margin of error: ± 3.8% Sample size: 666 | May 1–2, 2013 | Hillary Clinton; 55% | Joe Biden; 17% | Andrew Cuomo; 4% | Deval Patrick 4%, Elizabeth Warren 4%, Martin O'Malley 1%, Kirsten Gillibrand 0%, Brian Schweitzer 0%, Mark Warner 0%, Someone else/Not sure 14% |

== Results ==
Primary date: March 1, 2016
National delegates: 91

Results of the Massachusetts Democratic primary on March 1, 2016
| Candidate | Popular vote | | Estimated delegates | | |
| Candidate | Count | Percentage | Pledged | Unpledged | Total |
|---|---|---|---|---|---|
| Hillary Clinton | 606,822 | 49.73% | 46 | 21 | 67 |
| Bernie Sanders | 589,803 | 48.33% | 45 | 1 | 46 |
| Martin O'Malley (withdrawn) | 4,783 | 0.39% | 0 | 0 | 0 |
| Rocky De La Fuente | 1,545 | 0.13% | 0 | 0 | 0 |
| No preference | 8,090 | 0.66% | – | 2 | 2 |
| All others | 4,927 | 0.40% | 0 | 0 | 0 |
| Blank votes | 4,326 | 0.35% | – | – | – |
| Total | 1,220,296 | 100% | 91 | 24 | 115 |

=== Results by county ===
| County | Clinton | | Sanders | | O'Malley | | De La Fuente | |
| County | # | % | # | % | # | % | # | % |
|---|---|---|---|---|---|---|---|---|
| Barnstable | 21,889 | 48.7% | 22,456 | 50.0% | 165 | 0.4% | 51 | 0.1% |
| Berkshire | 12,916 | 47.6% | 13,851 | 51.0% | 69 | 0.3% | 36 | 0.1% |
| Bristol | 37,187 | 48.7% | 36,797 | 48.2% | 311 | 0.4% | 111 | 0.1% |
| Dukes | 2,312 | 44.8% | 3,804 | 54.4% | 13 | 0.3% | 1 | 0.0% |
| Essex | 65,679 | 48.7% | 66,797 | 49.3% | 505 | 0.5% | 160 | 0.1% |
| Franklin | 5,485 | 29.0% | 13,286 | 70.2% | 48 | 0.3% | 5 | 0.0% |
| Hampden | 31,766 | 50.3% | 29,699 | 47.0% | 333 | 0.3% | 132 | 0.2% |
| Hampshire | 14,309 | 40.4% | 24,638 | 57.6% | 107 | 0.2% | 37 | 0.1% |
| Middlesex | 170,096 | 51.5% | 154,785 | 46.9% | 1,123 | 0.3% | 384 | 0.1% |
| Nantucket | 979 | 47.5% | 1,060 | 51.5% | 5 | 0.2% | 1 | 0.0% |
| Norfolk | 72,105 | 52.7% | 61,835 | 45.2% | 654 | 0.5% | 180 | 0.1% |
| Plymouth | 39,165 | 48.3% | 40,219 | 49.6% | 336 | 0.4% | 112 | 0.1% |
| Suffolk | 79,314 | 56.6% | 58,134 | 41.5% | 592 | 0.4% | 167 | 0.1% |
| Worcester | 53,610 | 44.8% | 63,745 | 53.2% | 522 | 0.4% | 168 | 0.1% |
| Total | 606,822 | 49.7% | 589,803 | 48.3% | 4,783 | 0.4% | 1,545 | 0.1% |

== Analysis ==
Clinton ran a close race against Bernie Sanders, much closer than her 15-point-win in the state eight years earlier against Barack Obama, but ultimately she came out victorious in Massachusetts. She lost the white vote (85% of the electorate in Massachusetts) narrowly, 50-49, to Bernie Sanders, according to exit polls. She also lost the male vote 58-41. However, she won the non-white vote 59-41, and the votes of women 57-42 (including both married women 59-40, and unmarried women 53-46), which likely put her over the top statewide.

Sanders won among voters who had only a high school diploma or less, while Clinton won more highly educated voters, including postgraduates, who made up a larger proportion of the Massachusetts electorate. And while Sanders won 54-46 among voters under the age of 45, Clinton won 54-45 with those over 45 years of age, including a resounding 59-39 victory among senior citizens. And while Sanders won 55-45 among voters who make less than $100k per year, Clinton won with more affluent voters.

In terms of political party affiliation, Clinton won Democrats (65% of the electorate) 60-40, but lost Independents to Sanders 66-33.

While Sanders carried a majority of counties statewide, Clinton swept most of the major urban areas and cities, as well as the affluent suburbs. She won Boston by a large margin and also emerged victorious in other urban and more moderate towns such as Springfield and Worcester.

The Clinton win in Massachusetts came as a major blow to the Sanders campaign on Super Tuesday, as he had wanted to win a blue, largely white and liberal state like Massachusetts resoundingly in order to stay competitive after disappointing losses across the Southeast.

Following the primary, Elizabeth Warren, the state's senior US senator, was widely criticized by Sanders supporters online for her refusal to endorse him prior to the primary. Supporters of Bernie Sanders have argued that an endorsement from Warren, whose political positions were similar to that of Sanders's, and who was a frequent critic of Hillary Clinton in the past, could have handed Massachusetts to him. Warren though, had made it clear prior to the primary that she would not endorse either candidate until the end of the primary season, in which she eventually endorsed Clinton.

== See also ==
- 2016 Massachusetts Republican presidential primary
