= Economic policy of the Trump administration =

The economic policy of the Trump administration may refer to:

- Economic policy of the first Trump administration
- Economic policy of the second Trump administration
