= John Reagan (New Hampshire politician) =

American politician (born 1946)

Member of the New Hampshire Senate from the 17th district
- In office December 5, 2012 – December 7, 2022
- Preceded by: John Barnes Jr.
- Succeeded by: Howard Pearl

Member of the New Hampshire House of Representatives from the Rockingham 1st district
- In office December 6, 2006 – December 5, 2012
- Preceded by: Multi-member district
- Succeeded by: Bruce Hodgdon

Personal details
- Born: August 5, 1946 (age 79) Westfield, Massachusetts
- Party: Republican

John Reagan (born August 5, 1946) is an American politician who served in the New Hampshire Senate from the 17th district from 2012 to 2022. He previously served in the New Hampshire House of Representatives from the Rockingham 1 district from 2006 to 2012.He endorsed George Pataki in the 2016 Republican primaries.
