= New Hampshire's 17th State Senate district =

American legislative district

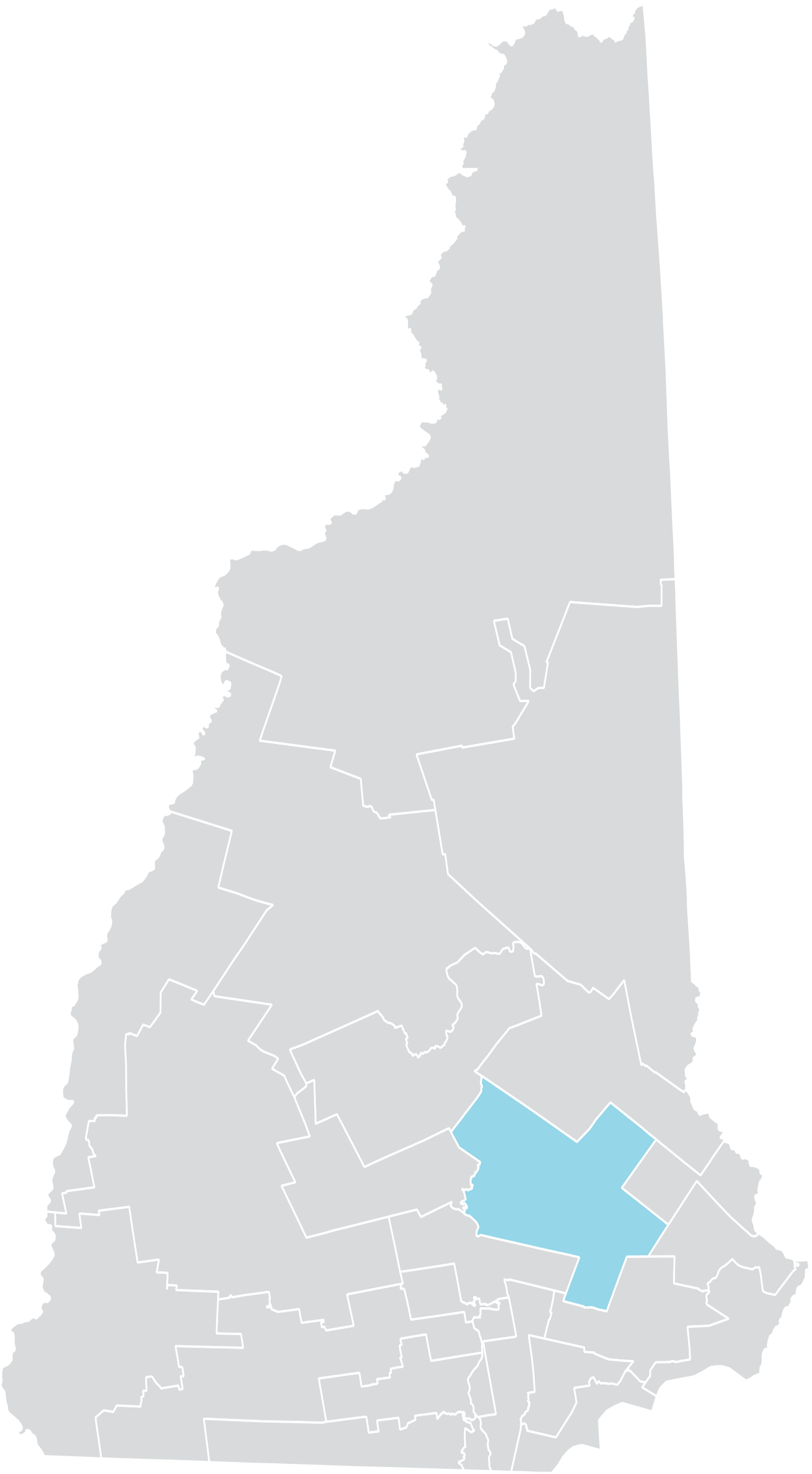
Senator
Howard Pearl; R–Loudon
- Registration: 34.2% Republican; 23.0% Democratic; 42.8% No party preference
- Demographics: 95.5% White; 0.4% Black; 1.9% Hispanic; 0.6% Asian
- Population (2019) • Citizens of voting age: 57,013; 44,667

New Hampshire's 17th State Senate district is one of 24 districts in the New Hampshire Senate. It has been represented by Republican Howard Pearl since 2022.

== Geography ==
District 17 covers parts of Merrimack, Rockingham, and Strafford Counties to the east of Concord, including the towns of Allenstown, Chichester, Deerfield, Epsom, Loudon, Northwood, Nottingham, Pembroke, Pittsfield, Raymond, and Strafford.

The district overlaps with both New Hampshire's 1st congressional district and New Hampshire's 2nd congressional district.

== Recent election results ==
=== 2024 ===
2024 New Hampshire State Senate election, District 17
Party	Candidate	Votes	%
Republican	Howard Pearl (Incumbent)	19,762	57.72
Democratic	Kelly Roberts	14,456	42.23
Write-in		16	0.05
Total votes		34,234	100.0
Republican hold			

=== 2022 ===
2022 New Hampshire State Senate election, District 17
Primary election
Party	Candidate	Votes	%
Republican	Howard Pearl	4,436	69.9
Republican	Scott Bryer	1,906	30.1
Total votes		6,342	100
General election
Republican	Howard Pearl	14,878	56.8
Democratic	Christine Tappan	11,311	43.2
Total votes		26,189	100
Republican hold			

Elections prior to 2022 were held under different district lines.

== Historical election results ==
=== 2020 ===
2020 New Hampshire State Senate election, District 17
Primary election
Party	Candidate	Votes	%
Republican	John Reagan (incumbent)	5,688	82.4
Republican	Janet DelFuoco	1,201	17.4
Total votes		6,900	100
General election
Republican	John Reagan (incumbent)	20,317	60.1
Democratic	Nancy R.B. Fraher	13,488	39.9
Total votes		33,805	100
Republican hold			

=== 2018 ===
2018 New Hampshire State Senate election, District 17
Party	Candidate	Votes	%
Republican	John Reagan (incumbent)	13,172	55.5
Democratic	Christopher Roundy	10,578	44.5
Total votes		23,750	100
Republican hold			

=== 2016 ===
2016 New Hampshire State Senate election, District 17
Party	Candidate	Votes	%
Republican	John Reagan (incumbent)	18,252	61.3
Democratic	Nancy R.B. Fraher	11,522	38.7
Total votes		29,774	100
Republican hold			

=== 2014 ===
2014 New Hampshire State Senate election, District 17
Primary election
Party	Candidate	Votes	%
Republican	John Reagan (incumbent)	4,045	82.9
Republican	Howard Pearl	837	17.1
Total votes		4,882	100
General election
Republican	John Reagan (incumbent)	11,669	58.2
Democratic	Nancy R.B. Fraher	8,382	41.8
Total votes		20,051	100
Republican hold			

=== 2012 ===
2012 New Hampshire State Senate election, District 17
Primary election
Party	Candidate	Votes	%
Republican	John Reagan	2,689	51.2
Republican	Howard Pearl	2,559	48.8
Total votes		5,248	100
General election
Republican	John Reagan	14,672	52.8
Democratic	Nancy R.B. Fraher	13,138	47.2
Total votes		27,810	100
Republican hold			

=== Federal and statewide results ===
Year	Office	Results
2020	President	Trump 53.9 – 44.1%
2020	Senate	Shaheen 49.3 – 47.7%
2016	President	Trump 55.0 – 39.6%
2014	Senate	Brown 51.6 – 48.4%
2014	Governor	Havenstein 51.6– 48.4%
2012	President	Romney 50.0 – 48.6%
2012	Governor	Hassan 51.7 – 45.9%
