= New Hampshire's 8th State Senate district =

American legislative district

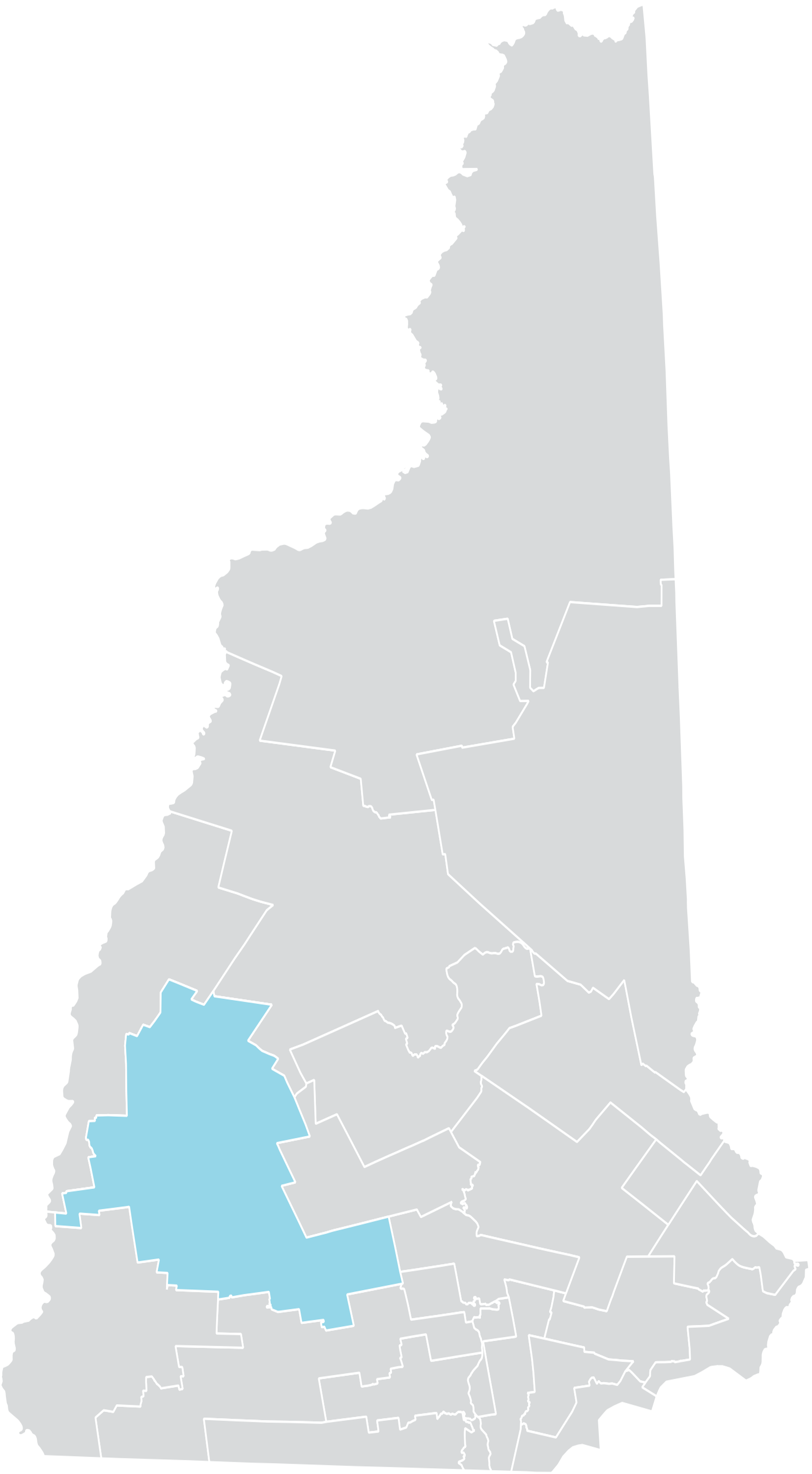
Senator
Ruth Ward; R–Stoddard
- Registration: 32.0% Republican; 24.1% Democratic; 43.9% No party preference
- Demographics: 95.5% White; 0.4% Black; 1.2% Hispanic; 0.5% Asian
- Population (2019) • Citizens of voting age: 55,724; 44,345

New Hampshire's 8th State Senate district is one of 24 districts in the New Hampshire Senate. It has been represented by Republican Ruth Ward since 2016, succeeding fellow Republican Jerry Little.

== Geography ==
District 8 covers parts of Cheshire, Hillsborough, Merrimack, and Sullivan Counties, including the towns of Acworth, Antrim, Bennington, Claremont, New Hampshire, Charlestown, Croydon, Deering, Dunbarton, Francestown, Gilsum, Langdon, Lempster, Marlow, Newport, Stoddard, Sunapee, Washington, Weare and Windsor.

The district is located entirely within New Hampshire's 2nd congressional district. Its western end is very close to the state of Vermont, but does not border it.

== Recent election results ==
=== 2024 ===
2024 New Hampshire State Senate election, District 8
Party	Candidate	Votes	%
Republican	Ruth Ward (Incumbent)	18,463	58.25
Democratic	David Trumble	13,178	41.63
Write-in		12	0.04
Total votes		31,653	100.0
Republican hold			

=== 2022 ===
2022 New Hampshire State Senate election, District 8
Party	Candidate	Votes	%
Republican	Ruth Ward (incumbent)	14,080	57.2
Democratic	Charlene Lovett	10,520	42.7
Total votes		24,610	100.0

=== 2020 ===
2020 New Hampshire State Senate election, District 8
Party	Candidate	Votes	%
Republican	Ruth Ward (incumbent)	18,903	55.6
Democratic	Jenn Alford-Teaster	15,114	44.4
Total votes		34,017	100
Republican hold			

=== 2018 ===
2018 New Hampshire State Senate election, District 8
Party	Candidate	Votes	%
Republican	Ruth Ward (incumbent)	12,859	51.3
Democratic	Jenn Alford-Teaster	12,212	48.7
Total votes		25,071	100
Republican hold			

=== 2016 ===
2016 New Hampshire State Senate election, District 8
Primary election
Party	Candidate	Votes	%
Republican	Ruth Ward	2,618	50.1
Republican	Jim Beard	2,609	49.9
Total votes		5,227	100
General election
Republican	Ruth Ward	16,150	53.1
Democratic	John Garvey	14,289	46.9
Total votes		30,439	100
Republican hold			

=== 2014 ===
2014 New Hampshire State Senate election, District 8
Primary election
Party	Candidate	Votes	%
Republican	Jerry Little	4,100	69.3
Republican	J. P. Marzullo	1,817	30.7
Total votes		5,917	100
General election
Republican	Jerry Little	12,033	55.5
Democratic	Linda Tanner	9,649	44.5
Total votes		21,682	100
Republican hold			

=== 2012 ===
2012 New Hampshire State Senate election, District 8
Party	Candidate	Votes	%
Republican	Bob Odell (incumbent)	17,709	61.4
Democratic	Christopher Wallenstein	11,138	38.6
Total votes		28,847	100
Republican hold			

=== Federal and statewide results ===
Year	Office	Results
2020	President	Trump 49.1 – 49.0%
2016	President	Trump 51.0 – 43.6%
2014	Senate	Shaheen 51.5 – 48.5%
2014	Governor	Hassan 50.9 – 49.1%
2012	President	Obama 51.1 – 47.4%
2012	Governor	Hassan 53.2 – 43.6%
