= Shedd Brook =

- Location within New Hampshire Location within the United States

Location
- Country: United States
- State: New Hampshire
- Counties: Sullivan, Hillsborough
- Towns: Washington, Windsor, Hillsborough

Physical characteristics
- Source: North Outlet, Highland Lake
  - location: Washington
  - coordinates: 43°8′17″N 72°4′53″W
  - elevation: 1,296 ft (395 m)
- Mouth: Beards Brook
  - location: Hillsborough
  - coordinates: 43°7′17″N 71°56′2″W
  - elevation: 630 ft (190 m)
- Length: 11.3 mi (18.2 km)

Basin features
- Tributaries
  - right: White Pond Brook, Black Pond Brook

Shedd Brook is an 11.3-mile-long (18.2 km) stream located in southern New Hampshire in the United States. It is a tributary of Beards Brook, part of the Contoocook River and Merrimack River watersheds.

Shedd Brook begins at the north outlet of Highland Lake in Washington, New Hampshire. The brook flows east, crossing the small town of Windsor and entering Hillsborough. Hillsborough Upper Village is located where Black Pond Brook descends over falls to join Shedd Brook, which ends two miles downstream at Beards Brook.

New Hampshire Route 31 follows Shedd Brook in Washington and Windsor.

== See also ==
- List of rivers of New Hampshire
