= East Lempster, New Hampshire =

Unincorporated community in New Hampshire, United States

- Unincorporated community
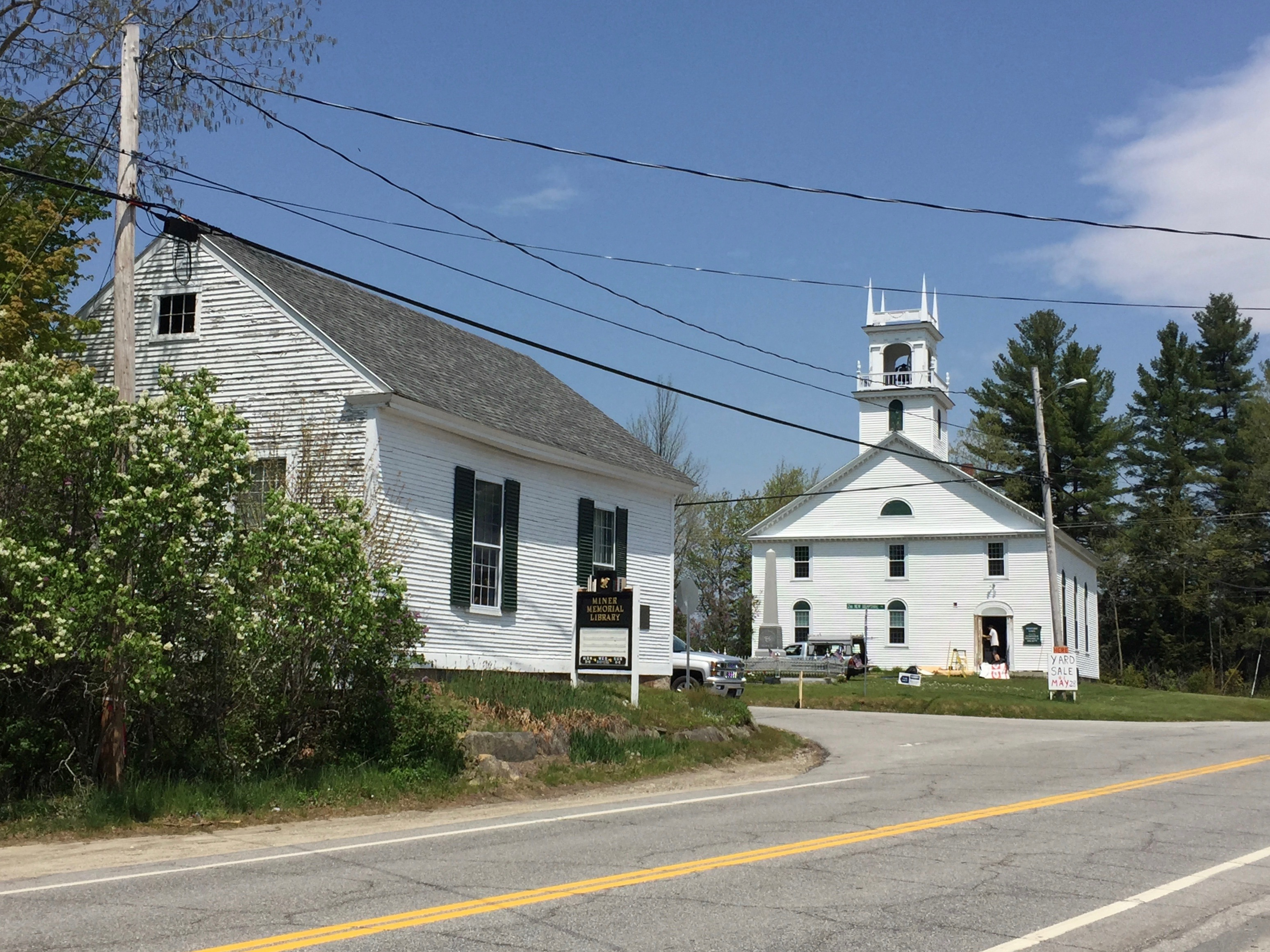
- Miner Library and History Hall in East Lempster

- Location within New Hampshire Location within the United States
- Coordinates: 43°13′30″N 72°10′42″W
- Country: United States
- State: New Hampshire
- County: Sullivan
- Town: Lempster
- Elevation: 1,220 ft (370 m)
- Time zone: UTC-5 (Eastern (EST))
  - Summer (DST): UTC-4 (EDT)
- ZIP code: 03605
- Area code: 603
- GNIS feature ID: 866717

East Lempster is an unincorporated community in the town of Lempster in Sullivan County, New Hampshire, United States.

The village is located at the intersection of New Hampshire Route 10 with the Second New Hampshire Turnpike, a country road leading northwest to Lempster village, the town of Unity, and the city of Claremont. Route 10 connects East Lempster with Newport to the north and Marlow and Keene to the south. Mountain Road, a continuation of Second New Hampshire Turnpike, leads southeast over Lempster Mountain to the town of Washington.
