= Miner Memorial Library =

Historic church in New Hampshire, United States

- First Universalist Chapel
- U.S. National Register of Historic Places
- NH State Register of Historic Places
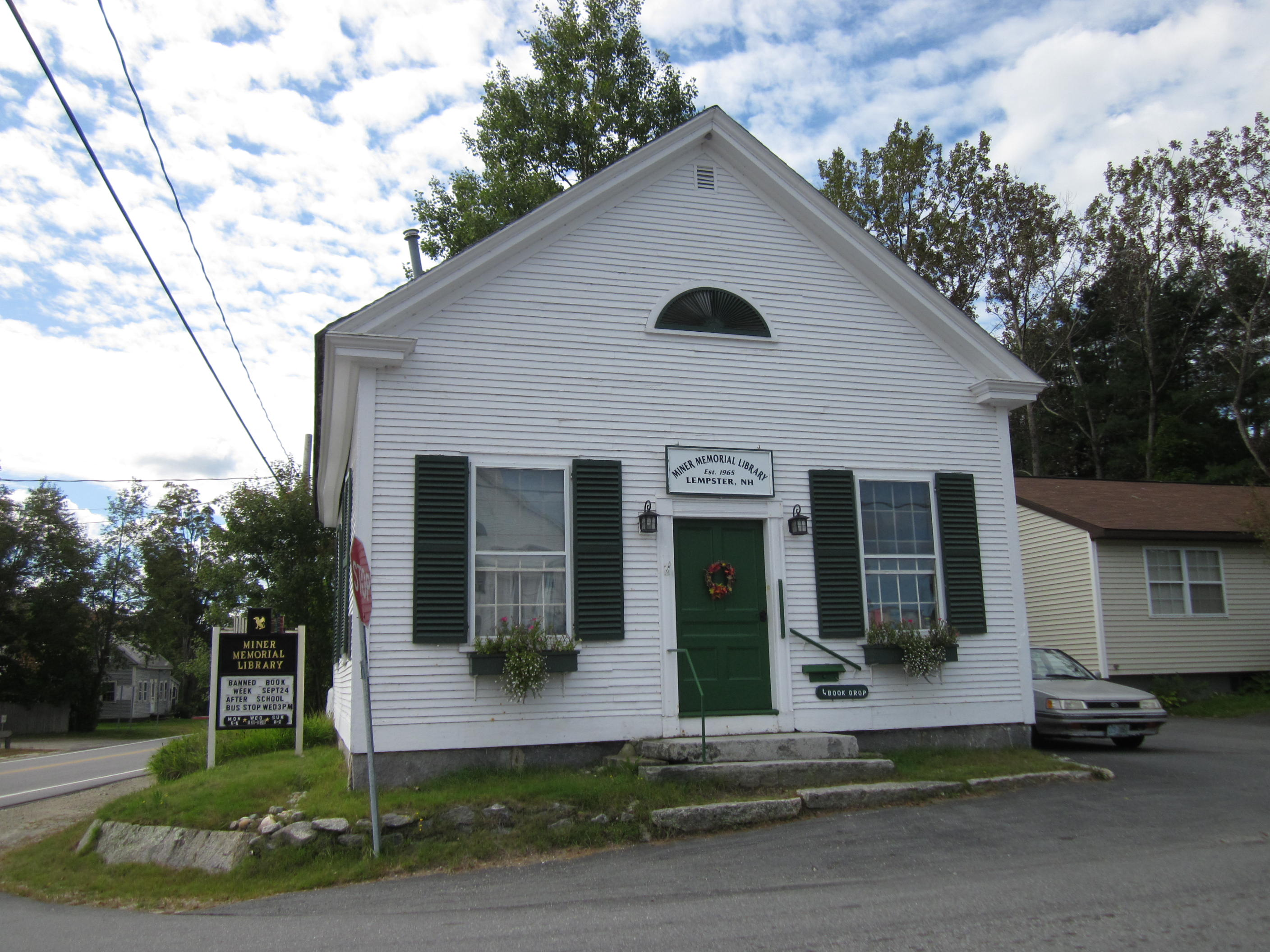

- Location within New Hampshire Location within the United States
- Location: 3 Second New Hampshire Turnpike, Lempster, New Hampshire
- Coordinates: 43°13′33″N 72°10′42″W
- Area: less than one acre
- Built: 1845
- Architect: Parker, William B.
- Architectural style: Mid 19th Century Revival
- NRHP reference No.: 06001130

Significant dates
- Added to NRHP: December 12, 2006
- Designated NHSRHP: January 30, 2006

Miner Memorial Library is the public library of Lempster, New Hampshire, located at 3 Second New Hampshire Turnpike. The library occupies a single-story wood-frame structure built in 1845 as a church for a Universalist congregation. Despite significant alteration for its use as a library, the building remains a fine example of vernacular church architecture in Sullivan County. Under the name First Universalist Chapel, the building was listed on the National Register of Historic Places in December 2006, and the New Hampshire State Register of Historic Places in January 2006.

== Architecture and history ==
The Miner Memorial Library is located in the village center of East Lempster, at the southwest corner of New Hampshire Route 10 and the 2nd New Hampshire Turnpike. It is a 1 1/2-story wood-frame structure, with a gabled roof and clapboarded exterior. It is finely trimmed, but lacking in details that indicate any particular architectural style, other than a Federal style fan in the front gable. The main facade is three bays wide, with a center entrance framed by simple moulding with corner blocks.

The building was constructed in 1845 for a Universalist congregation that had probably existed since the 1830s. During the congregation's ownership, relatively few alterations were made, most notably the addition of some windows and electrification in 1941. The building was formally dedicated in 1927 to the memory of Lempster native Alonzo Ames Miner, a leading Universalist minister and president of Tufts College. By the late 1940s the congregation had shrunk to the point that only summer services were held here, and in 1964 its trustees offered the building to the town.

== See also ==
- National Register of Historic Places listings in Sullivan County, New Hampshire
