= Lovewell Mountain =

Mountain in New Hampshire, United States

Highest point
- Elevation: 2,473 ft (754 m)
- Prominence: 837 ft (255 m)
- Coordinates: 43°12′13″N 72°03′39″W

Naming
- Etymology: John Lovewell

Geography
- Location: Washington, New Hampshire
- Parent range: Sunapee Ridge

Geology
- Rock age: 200-400 million yrs.
- Mountain type: Metamorphic rock

Climbing
- Easiest route: Monadnock-Sunapee Greenway

Lovewell Mountain is a 2,473-foot (754 m) mountain associated with the Sunapee Ridge in southwest New Hampshire. The mountain is traversed by the 50-mile (80 km) Monadnock-Sunapee Greenway and offers vistas from several ledges near its summit. Much of the mountain is wooded with species of the northern hardwood forest type; stands of coniferous red spruce are common on the mountain's higher elevations.

The east side of Lovewell Mountain drains into the Beards Brook watershed, then into the Contoocook River, then the Merrimack River and the Atlantic Ocean. The west side drains into the North Branch watershed via a series of lakes and unnamed streams then joins Beards Brook just before its confluence with the Contoocook River.
