= Sally Rogers (disambiguation) =

Sally Rogers (born 1964) is an English actress.

Sally Rogers may also refer to:

- Sally Rogers (artist) (c. 1790–1813), American painter
- Sally Rogers (character), a character in The Dick Van Dyke Show
- Sally J. Rogers (born 1950), American academic in autism
- Sally Rogers (musician), American singer-songwriter and music educator
