= Pitcher Mountain =

Mountain in New Hampshire, United States

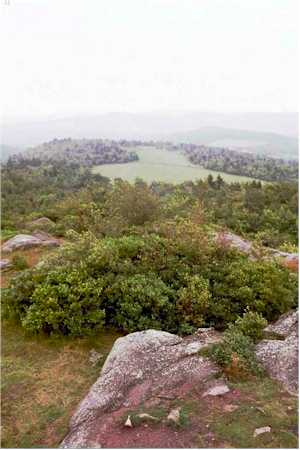
- View from summit; beef livestock farm below.

Highest point
- Elevation: 2,153 ft (656 m)
- Prominence: 657 ft (200 m)
- Coordinates: 43°05′38″N 72°08′06″W

Geography
- Location: Stoddard, New Hampshire

Geology
- Rock age: 200–400 million yrs.
- Mountain type: Metamorphic rock

Climbing
- Easiest route: Monadnock-Sunapee Greenway

Pitcher Mountain is a 2,153 foot (656 m) monadnock located in southwest New Hampshire. The mountain is traversed by the 50 mile (80 km) Monadnock-Sunapee Greenway and offers 360 degree views from its open summit. Lower elevations are wooded with species of the northern hardwood forest type; small stands of coniferous red spruce cling to the upper slopes. A fire tower stands on the summit and a beef livestock farm occupies the east shoulder of the mountain. Pitcher Mountain is part of an extensive area of heath barrens and blueberry fields that continue north over Hubbard Hill and Jackson Hill.

The east and north sides of Pitcher Mountain drain into the Beards Brook watershed, then into the Contoocook River, then the Merrimack River and the Atlantic Ocean. The west and south sides drain into Robinson Brook, thence Otter Brook, "The Branch", the Ashuelot River, then the Connecticut River and Long Island Sound.
