= Martha Ann Honeywell =

American artist

- Born: 1786
- Died: 1856 (aged 69–70)
- Known for: Silhouettes and embroidery

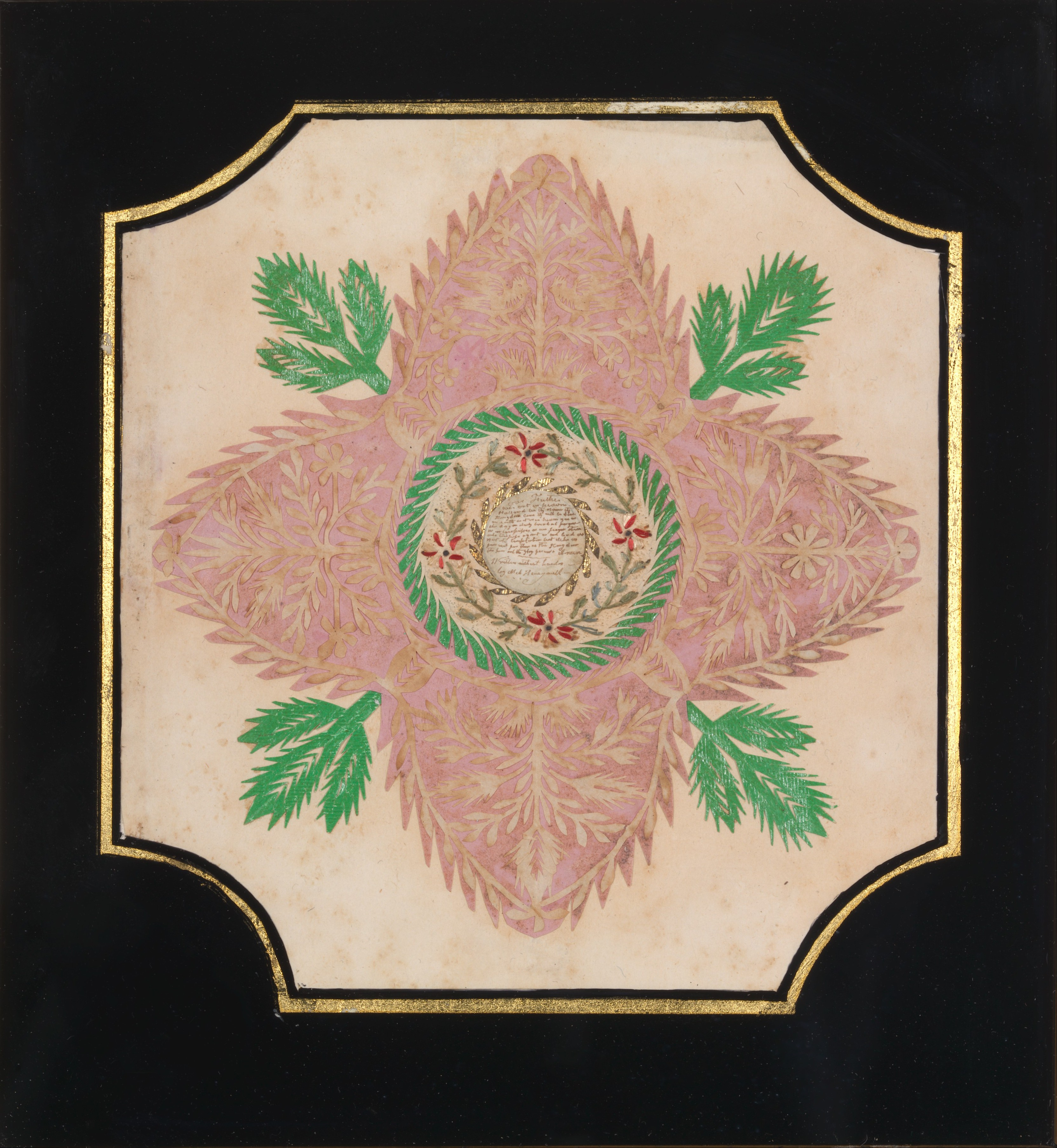
Paper cutout featuring the Lord's Prayer, c. 1830, in the collection of the Metropolitan Museum of Art

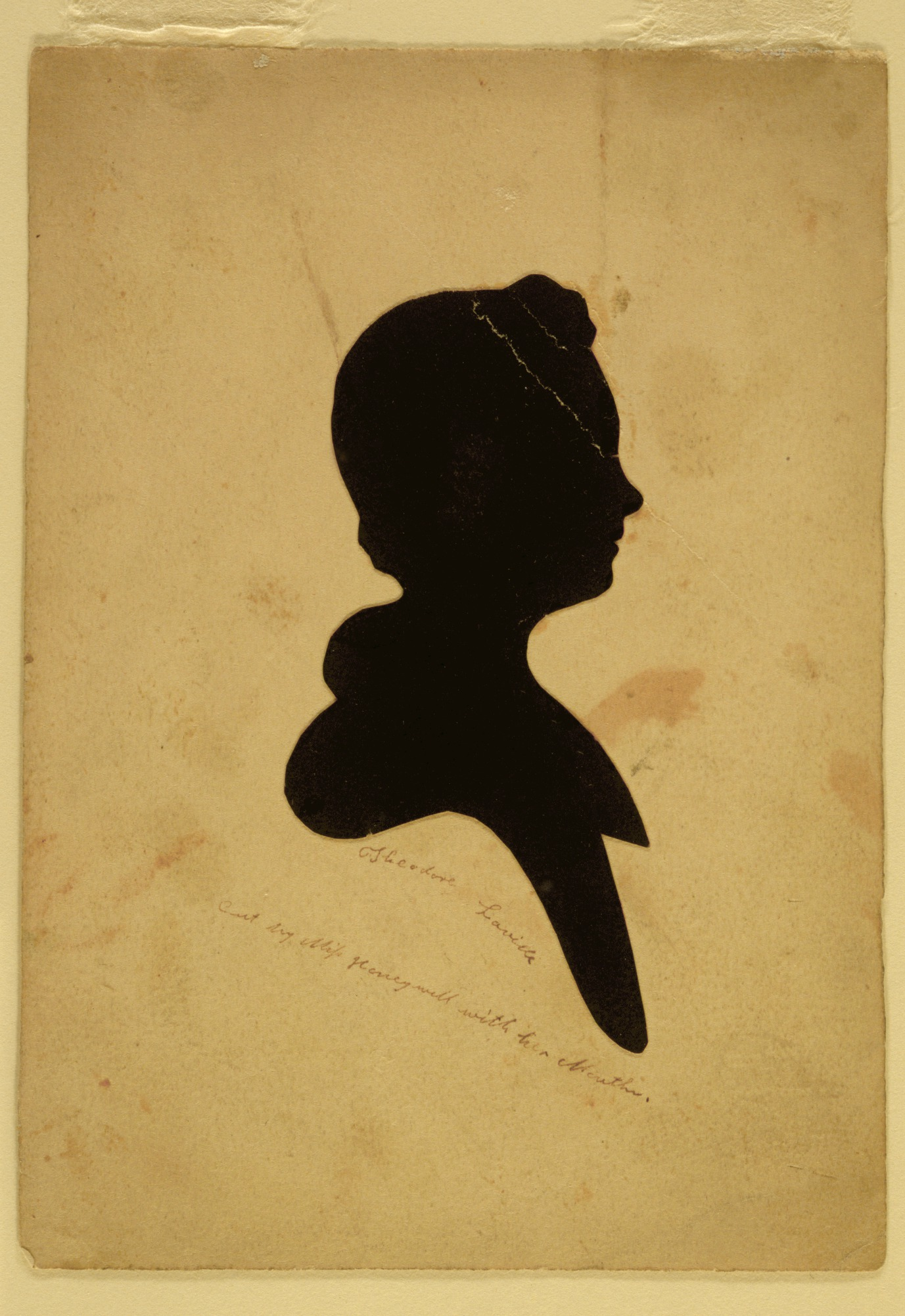
Silhouette of Theodore Laveille, c. 1830, in the collection of the Missouri History Museum

Martha Ann (sometimes Anne) Honeywell (1786–1856) was an American artist with physical disabilities who produced silhouettes and embroidery using only her mouth and her toes, often in public performances.

== Early life ==
A native either of Lempster, New Hampshire, or of Westchester, New York, Honeywell was born without hands or forearms, and had only three toes on one foot. One of her advertisements claimed she stood only three feet tall.

== Career ==
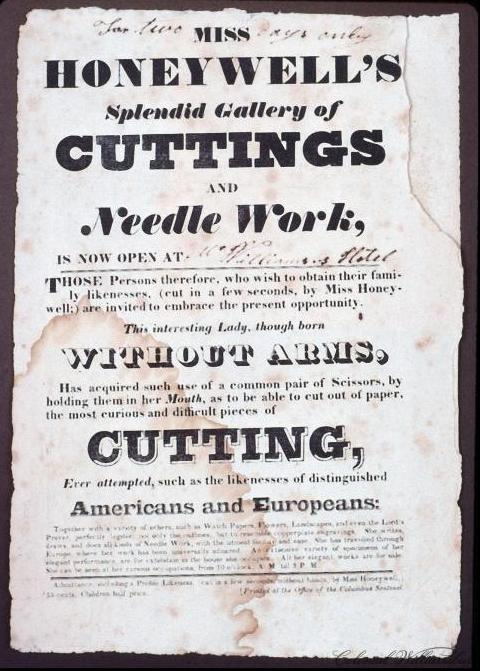
1831 flyer advertising sittings for silhouette cuttings by Martha Ann Honeywell.

Honeywell was known for her silhouettes, paper cutouts, needlework, and penmanship. She became a public performer around the United States, displaying her talents. During one such display, recorded by diarist William Bentley, she threaded a needle and embroidered with her toes and mouth; balanced scissors with her mouth and arm stump to make paper cutouts; and wrote a letter with her toes. Besides silhouettes, another of her specialties was a cutout with a handwritten version of the Lord's Prayer at its center.

Many of her public appearances are documented in newspaper advertisements. According to these she would perform three times a day, each show lasting two hours and costing fifty cents a ticket. One broadside indicates silhouettes would be cut in a few seconds for twenty-five cents, half-price for children. Honeywell appeared in Salem, Massachusetts, in 1806 and 1809; Charleston, South Carolina in 1808 and 1834–5; in New York City in 1829, and in Louisville, Kentucky, in 1839. She was in Boston in 1806. In 1832 she is recorded as having appeared in Richmond, Virginia. A broadside also indicates that she traveled to Europe, where her work was well received. On many occasions, Honeywell appeared in the company of another, similar disabled artist, Sally Rogers.

== Collections ==
A paper cutout by Honeywell featuring the Lord's Prayer, dating to around 1830, is in the collection of the Metropolitan Museum of Art. The New-York Historical Society also has a Lord's Prayer cutout by Honeywell. An undated silhouette of a lady is owned by the Smithsonian American Art Museum. The Abby Aldrich Rockefeller Folk Art Museum owns another cutout with the Lord's Prayer as well as a broadside advertising her work. Two of her silhouettes are owned by Historic Deerfield. A silhouette of E. Tupper is held by the American Antiquarian Society. The historical society of Montgomery County, Pennsylvania owns an example of her work as well. A group of silhouettes by Honeywell were featured in a 2001 exhibit called "Ordinary Folks, Extraordinary Art" at the Macculloch Hall Historical Museum in Morristown, New Jersey.
