= Bob Odell =

Bob Odell may refer to:

- Bob Odell (American football) (1922–2012), American football player and coach
- Bob Odell (politician) (born 1943), Republican member of the New Hampshire Senate
