= Island Pond (Stoddard, New Hampshire) =

Lake in Stoddard, New Hampshire

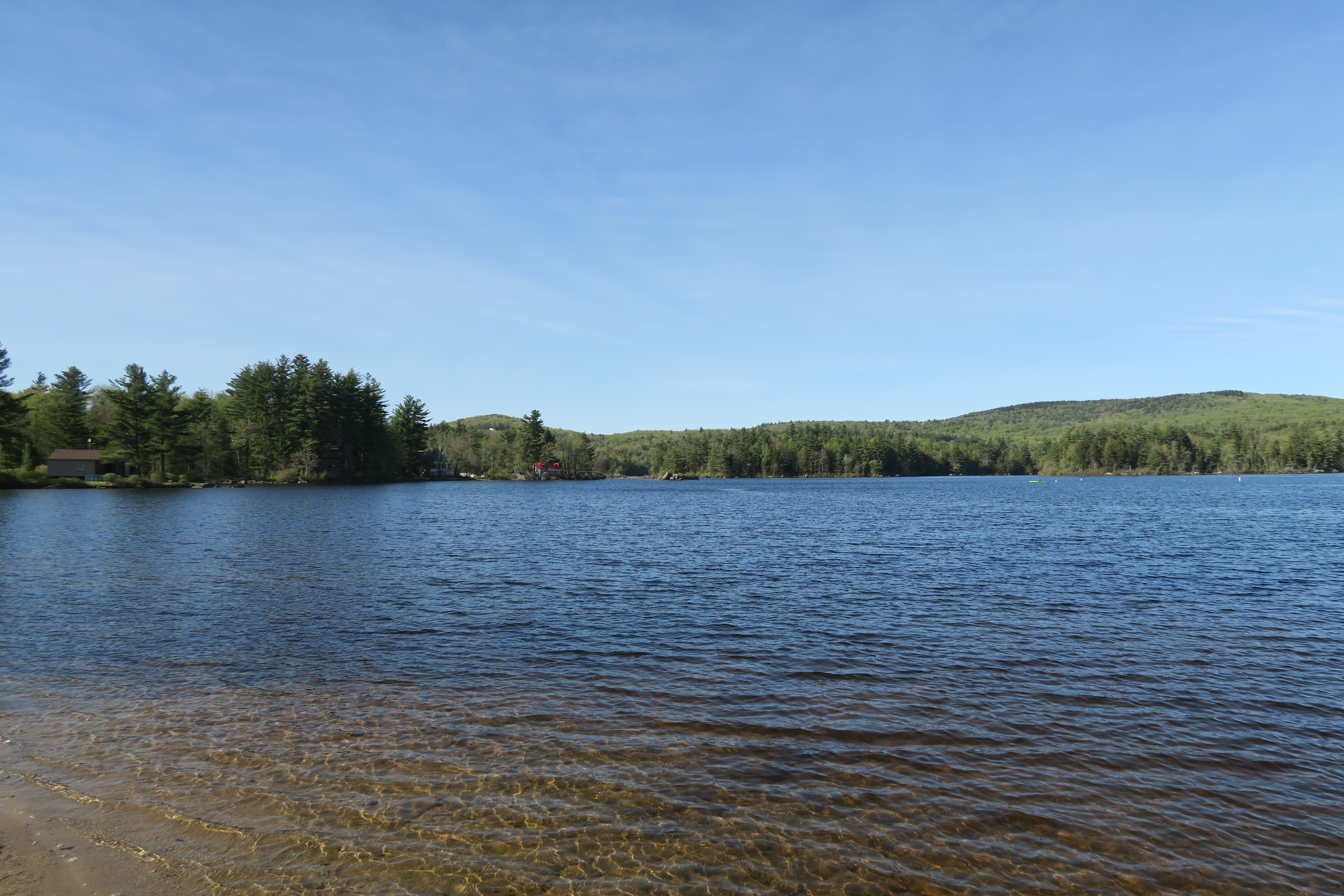
- Island Pond

- Location within New Hampshire Location within the United States
- Location: Cheshire County, New Hampshire
- Coordinates: 43°4′0″N 72°5′3″W
- Primary inflows: Highland Lake
- Primary outflows: tributary of North Branch Contoocook River
- Basin countries: United States
- Max. length: 1.1 mi (1.8 km)
- Max. width: 0.7 mi (1.1 km)
- Surface area: 179 acres (0.7 km^{2})
- Average depth: 8 ft (2.4 m)
- Max. depth: 15 ft (4.6 m)
- Surface elevation: 1,283 feet (391 m)
- Settlements: Stoddard

Island Pond is a 179-acre (0.72 km^{2}) water body located in Cheshire County in southwestern New Hampshire, United States, in the town of Stoddard. It is fed primarily by the outflow from Highland Lake, and its outlet is a tributary of the North Branch Contoocook River, part of the Merrimack River watershed.

The lake is classified as a warmwater fishery and contains largemouth and smallmouth bass, rock bass, yellow perch, pumpkinseed and horned pout.

== See also ==
- List of lakes in New Hampshire
