= Bob Odell (politician) =

American politician

Member of the New Hampshire Senate from the 8th district
- In office December 4, 2002 – December 5, 2014
- Preceded by: George Disnard
- Succeeded by: Jerry Little

Member of the New Hampshire House of Representatives from the 5th Sullivan district
- In office December 6, 2000 – December 4, 2002
- Preceded by: John G. Tuthill
- Succeeded by: Constituency abolished

Personal details
- Born: July 4, 1943 (age 83) Nashua, New Hampshire, U.S.
- Party: Republican
- Spouse: Sandy Odell
- Education: American University

Bob Odell is a Republican former member of the New Hampshire Senate, representing the 8th District from 2002 through 2014. He was a member of the New Hampshire House of Representatives from 2000 until 2002. He resides in Lempster, New Hampshire.
