= Franklin Pierce Lake =

Reservoir in New Hampshire

- Jackman Reservoir
- Location within New Hampshire Location within the United States
- Location: Hillsborough County, New Hampshire
- Coordinates: 43°5′54″N 71°57′10″W
- Type: Reservoir
- Primary inflows: North Branch Contoocook River
- Primary outflows: North Branch Contoocook River
- Basin countries: United States
- Max. length: 2.8 mi (4.5 km)
- Max. width: 0.7 mi (1.1 km)
- Surface area: 483 acres (2.0 km^{2})
- Average depth: 10 ft (3.0 m)
- Max. depth: 30 ft (9.1 m)
- Surface elevation: 764 ft (233 m)
- Settlements: Hillsborough; Antrim

Franklin Pierce Lake, also known as Jackman Reservoir, is a 483-acre (2.0 km^{2}) reservoir located in Hillsborough County in southern New Hampshire, United States, in the towns of Hillsborough and Antrim. It is named for Franklin Pierce, the 14th president of the United States, who was born in Hillsborough in a log cabin, the site of which is now under the lake. The lake impounds the North Branch of the Contoocook River and lies within the Merrimack River watershed.

The lake is classified as a warmwater fishery, with observed species including rainbow trout, brown trout, largemouth bass, smallmouth bass, chain pickerel, horned pout, white perch, northern pike, bluegill, and black crappie.

== See also ==
- List of lakes in New Hampshire
- New Hampshire Historical Marker No. 203: Stone Arch Bridges
