= Osman Cleander Baker =

American biblical scholar and bishop

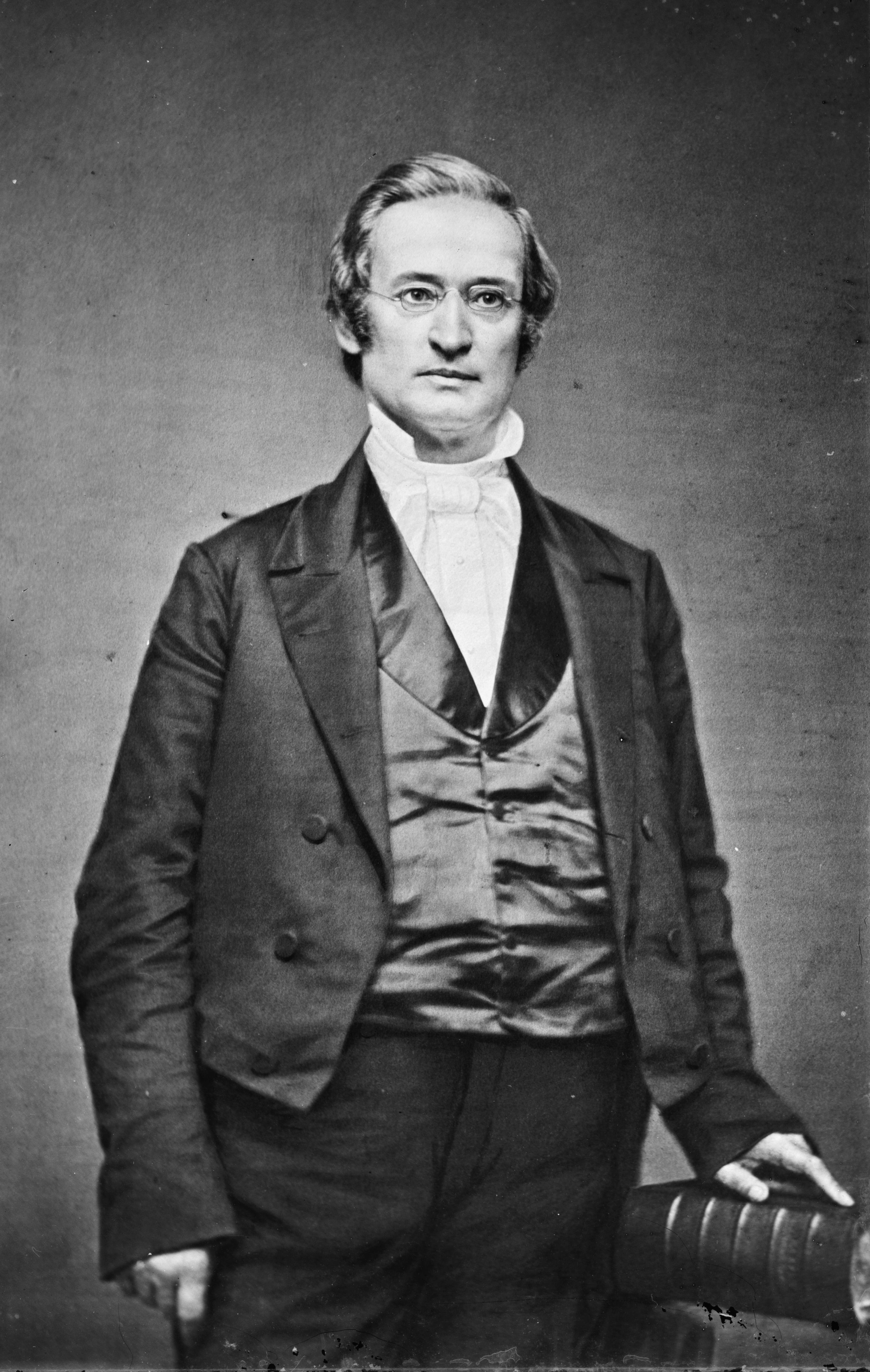
Osmon Cleander Baker, c. 1855–1865

Osmon Cleander Baker (30 July 1812 – 20 December 1871) was an American biblical scholar and bishop of the Methodist Episcopal Church. He was born and educated in New England, where he also served as pastor, principal and bishop.

== Early life ==
Osmon Cleander Baker was born in Marlow, New Hampshire in 1812. He entered the Wilbraham Wesleyan Academy, a preparatory school, at the age of fifteen. Soon after he converted to Christianity and was received into the church by Dr. Wilbur Fisk (who was at that time Principal of the school).

In 1829 Baker was licensed to exhort in his seventeenth year; young, unmarried men were chosen because they were most able to travel among a circuit of communities. In 1830 he entered Wesleyan University. He had successfully completed three years at Wesleyan when he had to leave because of failing health. Yet, while in college he was licensed as a Local Preacher and began to serve in that office.

== Ordained and academic ministry ==
Baker became a teacher in the seminary at Newbury, Vermont in 1834. He was elected principal of this seminary in 1839.

Having resigned the seminary principalship in 1844, the Rev. Mr. Baker was appointed pastor of the M.E. Church in Manchester, New Hampshire. He was appointed presiding elder of the Dover District in 1846.

During the next year he accepted a professorship in the General Biblical Institute in Concord, New Hampshire. This later developed as the Boston University School of Theology. Dr. Baker became a distinguished scholar. He also continued to reside in Concord for the remainder of his life.

== Episcopal ministry ==
The Rev. Dr. Osmon Cleander Baker was elected and consecrated to the episcopacy of the Methodist Episcopal Church by the 1852 General Conference. He served with success until 1866, when he began encountering health problems.

That year Bishop Baker suffered partial paralysis from a stroke while on his way to preside over the Colorado Annual Conference. He reached his destination with great difficulty. He examined and ordained the ordinands in a private room, rather than before the entire conference. He returned home, after having suffered much pain and extreme exhaustion.

With restored health, Bishop Baker presided at a few other annual conferences, and to attended the annual and semi-annual meetings of the Board of Bishops of the M.E. Church for two more years. But his strength again declined, and his voice was greatly affected.

== Death ==
Bishop Baker was no longer able to take a public role in the work of the church. Nevertheless, he continued to attend the various meetings and enjoyed them, up until a short time before his death.

Returning from worship one Sabbath, he fell helpless at his threshold. He suffered a mortal stroke on 8 December 1871, dying 20 December 1871 in Concord, New Hampshire, at the age of fifty-nine.

== Honors ==
- The Rev. Mr. Osmon Cleander Baker was awarded the honorary degree Doctor of Divinity.
- Baker University in Baldwin, Kansas was supported by the Methodist Church and named in his honor. Chartered 12 February 1858, Baker University is the oldest university in the State of Kansas.
- Baker is memorialized in a stained glass window at Marsh Chapel at Boston University.
- The Baker Memorial Church in Concord, New Hampshire, was named for him.

== Bishop Simpson's assessment ==
Matthew Simpson, who was made a bishop at the same General Conference, wrote this of his colleague Osman Cleander Baker:

In his general character he was distinguished for regularity and symmetry. His temperament was even and quiet; he was possessed of sound judgment and retentive memory, and combined calmness with firm religious convictions. As a teacher, he was assiduous; as a preacher, he was persuasive in manner, chastein style, and often his ministrations were attended with divine power. As a Bishop, he was impartial and judicious, and his administration was marked by a clear understanding of the constitution and laws of the church. His published work on the Discipline indicates his thorough knowledge of the administration of the church.

== See also ==
- List of bishops of the United Methodist Church
