= Highland Lake (Stoddard, New Hampshire) =

Freshwater lake in New Hampshire

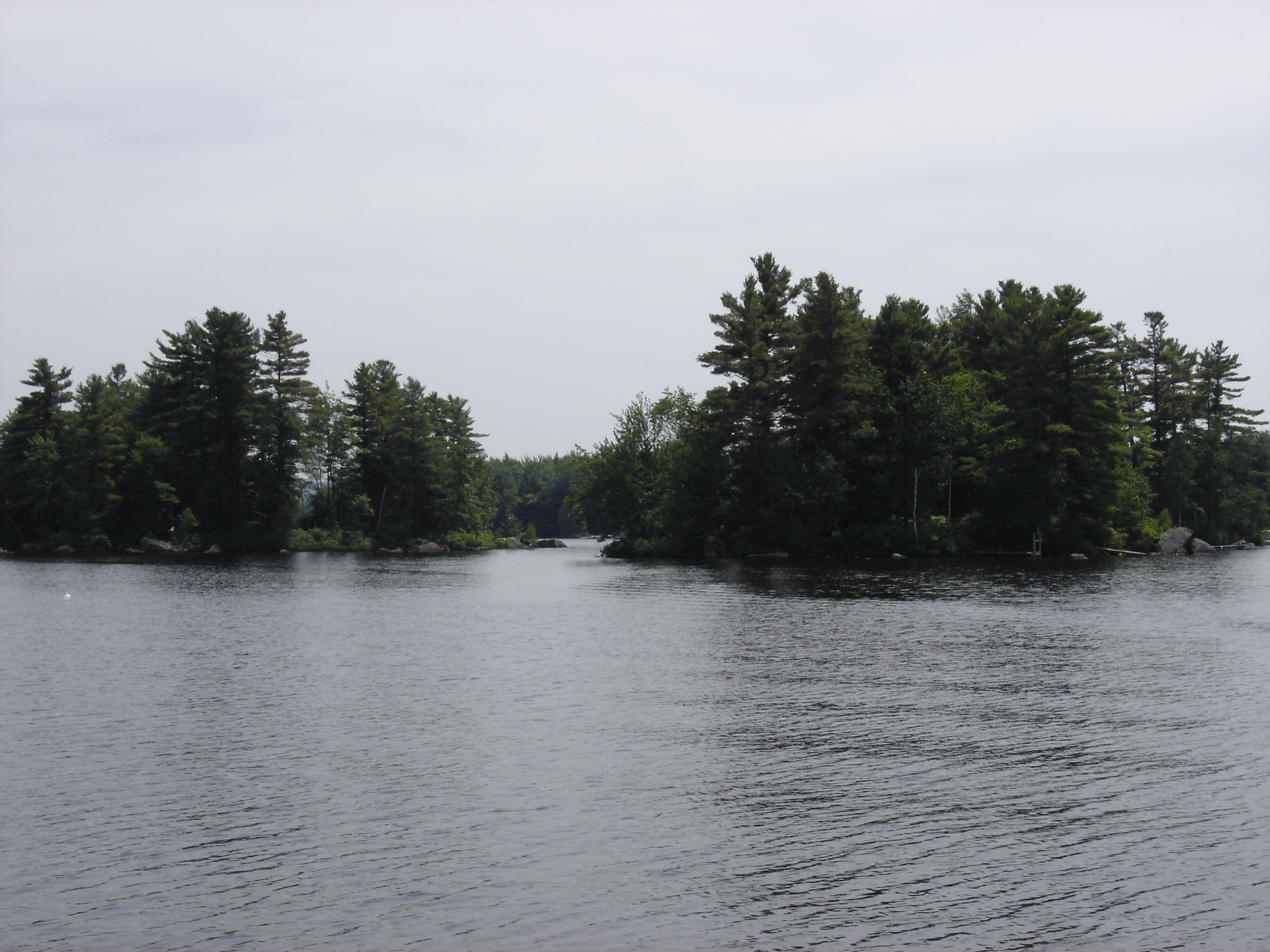
- Islands on the lake

- Location within New Hampshire Location within the United States
- Location: Sullivan County and Cheshire County, New Hampshire
- Coordinates: 43°6′2″N 72°5′22″W
- Primary inflows: Bog Brook
- Primary outflows: Shedd Brook (north outlet); tributary of North Branch Contoocook River (main outlet)
- Basin countries: United States
- Max. length: 6.0 mi (9.7 km)
- Max. width: 0.5 mi (0.80 km)
- Surface area: 697 acres (2.8 km^{2})
- Average depth: 7 ft (2.1 m)
- Max. depth: 30 ft (9.1 m)
- Surface elevation: 1,296 ft (395 m)
- Settlements: Washington; Stoddard (Mill Village)

Highland Lake is a 697-acre (2.82 km^{2}) water body located in Sullivan and Cheshire counties in southwestern New Hampshire, United States, in the towns of Washington and Stoddard. The lake has two outlets. The north outlet feeds Shedd Brook, while the south outlet flows through Island Pond to the North Branch of the Contoocook River. Water from the two outlets rejoins in the town of Hillsborough, approximately 8 miles (13 km) east of Highland Lake and one mile upstream from the Contoocook River. The northern end of the lake is only accessible by boat through a channel approximately 50 feet wide.

The lake has been a popular site for recreational boating during the summer and snowmobiling during the winter since before the 1960s. Waterskiiers are a frequent sight, and sea planes are known to occasionally use the lake. Most of the lakeside real estate has seasonal and year-round residences situated on plots of land smaller than .25 acres. The Highland Lake Marina (the waterway's only such establishment) is located at the end of Shedd Hill Road. It is open during summer weekends, and offers boat storage, docking, and recreational merchandise. There is also a diner attached.

The lake is classified as a warmwater fishery and is home to species such as black crappie, largemouth bass, smallmouth bass, chain pickerel, horned pout, and white perch. The land surrounding Pickerel Cove is owned and protected by the Society for the Protection of New Hampshire Forests.

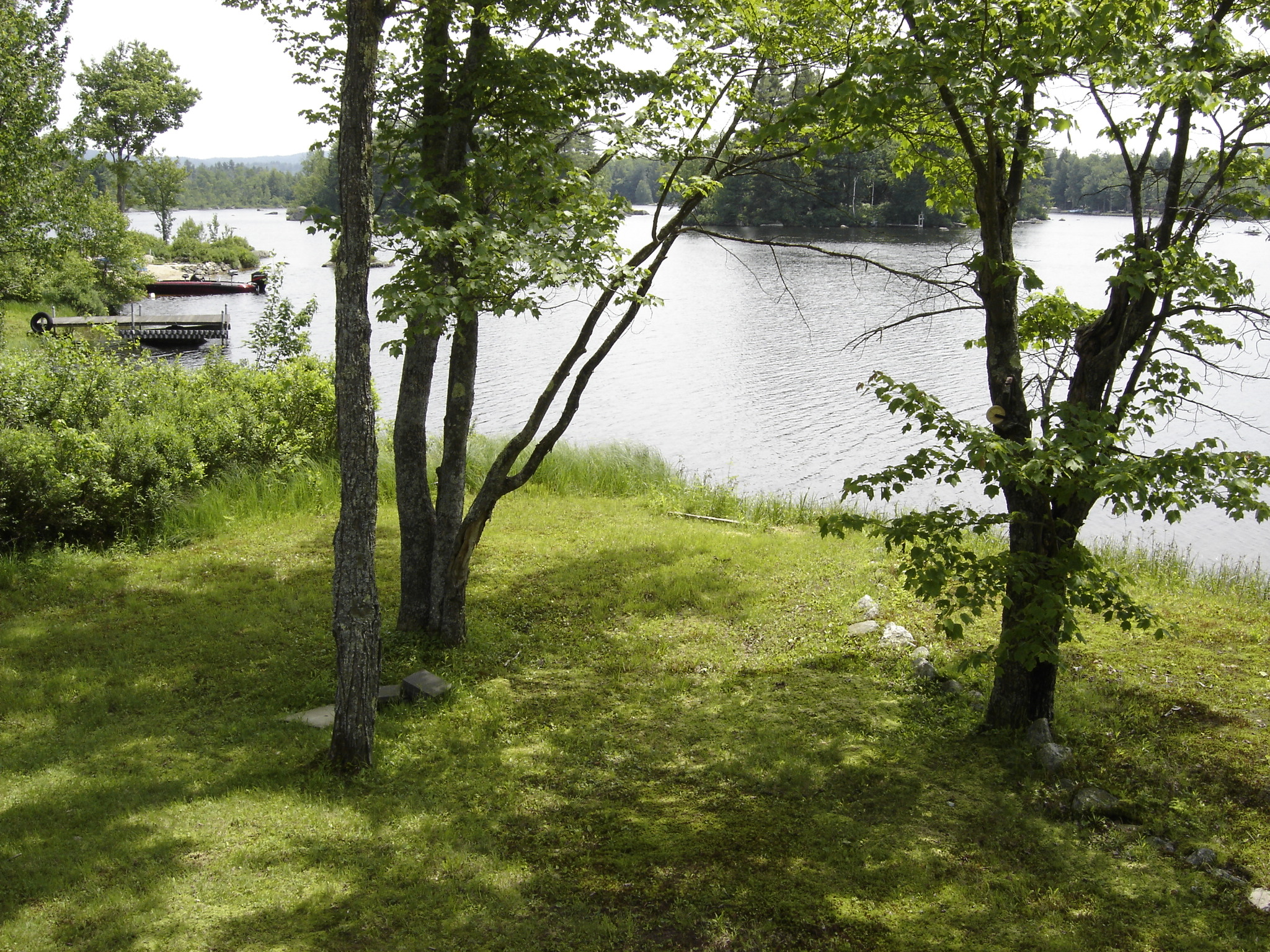
The shores of Highland Lake in the summertime

== See also ==
- List of lakes in New Hampshire
