= Wediko Children's Services =

American organization for children

- Founded: 1934 by Dr. Robert A. Young
- Type: Non-profit; NGO
- Purpose: Providing therapeutic services and programs for children, families, and schools
- Location(s): Windsor, NH; Boston, MA; New York City, NY
- Executive Director: Michael Pearis
- Website: www.wediko.org

Wediko Children's Services was a non-profit organization that provides therapeutic and educational services to children with serious emotional and behavioral problems and their families. It was founded in 1934. In 2020, it merged with The Home for Little Wanderers and now operates as The Wediko School.

== Overview ==
Wediko provides residential treatment, consultation, school-based, and home-based therapeutic services to children and families struggling with complex psychiatric profiles and disruptive behavior. Wediko treats children with disorders that include, but are not limited to, depression, bipolar disorder, anxiety disorder, attention deficit hyperactivity disorder (ADHD), attention deficit disorder (ADD), reactive attachment disorder (RAD), post-traumatic stress disorder (PTSD), Asperger syndrome, and nonverbal learning disorder (NLVD).

== History ==
The Wediko School, formerly known as Wediko Children Services, is a residential treatment program for children struggling with emotional, social, and behavioral disabilities. The Wediko Summer Program was started in 1934 by Dr. Robert A. Young. The initial goal was to provide a "fresh air" experience for children from the city whose behavior negated other summer options. For the next five years, the program ran at any site available for rental in Maine, New Hampshire, and Massachusetts. The program was suspended at the beginning of World War II and was reorganized in 1948. Wediko moved to the present 450-acre (180 ha) campus in Windsor, New Hampshire, in 1954. In 1980 Wediko established its School-Based Services working with students, teachers, and school personnel in schools in Boston and surrounding communities. In 1990 the Wediko School was started as a year-round residential program. In 2020, the Wediko Children Services merged with The Home for Little Wanderers. The Wediko School is now a program within The Home.

== Programs ==
=== Wediko Summer Program ===
The Wediko Summer Program is a 6 week residential treatment program for both boys and girls, ages 8 to 18, struggling with emotional, behavioral, and learning barriers. The Summer Program is located on the Wediko School's 450-acre waterfront campus in Windsor, New Hampshire.

=== School-based services ===
Starting in 1997, Boston Public Schools have contracted with Wediko to run a therapeutic summer school program for special education students. Wediko also offers training seminars and workshops on topics such as positive behavior interventions and supports, trauma-sensitive schools, and whole-school improvement. In September 2011, Wediko expanded to New York City to provide school-based services to children and families in New York City public schools. The Wediko School now works with children, their families, and their schools all over the country. Collaborating with families, schools, and other service providers, clinicians can assist children in all the important contexts in their lives.

=== Wediko School ===
The Wediko School is a year-round residential program that provides therapeutic and educational services to boys ranging from grade 5 to 12, with complex psychiatric, behavioral, and learning issues. The Wediko School day program offers the same support to both males and females in the same educational bracket. These students are transported to and from home, every school day.

=== Publications ===
A varying range of publications, dissertations, and presentations have been based on studies at Wediko, reaching researchers in personality, developmental, and clinical psychology, as well as practitioners in school and mental health settings. Publications have been reprinted in the Year Book of Psychiatry and Applied Mental Health (2003), The Reference Guide to Counseling Children and Adolescents: Prevention, treatment, outcomes (2000), and American Psychological Association journals including the Journal of Consulting and Clinical Psychology, and the Journal of Personality and Social Psychology.

A central theme of the research is that children's behaviors, and more broadly their personalities, cannot be understood without attention to the interpersonal contexts in which they are embedded. Research at Wediko beginning in the late 1980s led investigators to advance a "contextual" model of traits that conceptualizes personality as patterns of "if...then" links between social contexts and children's responses to them.
