= Baker Memorial Church =

Baker Memorial United Methodist Church
- Baker Memorial United Methodist Church
- 43.205°N 71.538°W
- Location: 307 Cedar Avenue, St. Charles, Illinois 60174, USA
- Country: United States
- Denomination: United Methodist
- Tradition: Evangelical

History
- Former name: Baker Memorial Church
- Founded: 1837
- Founder: Rev. John Clark
- Dedicated: 1954

Architecture
- Architect: Unknown
- Style: Gothic Revival
- Completed: 1954

Specifications
- Capacity: 259
- Materials: Limestone

Baker Memorial Church was a Methodist church in Concord, New Hampshire, United States. It organized on October 30, 1874, by Presiding Elder Theodore L. Flood, in response to a request from 100 members of the First Church, who believed the best interests of a growing Methodism could be served best with two societies instead of one.

The church was named in honor of Bishop Osmon C. Baker, a native of New Hampshire and a member of the New Hampshire Annual Conference. It was later demolished.
