= Martin L. Keyes =

- Born: February 19, 1850; Lempster, New Hampshire

Martin L. Keyes (born February 19, 1850) founded the Keyes Fibre Company in 1903.

Obtained a patent for a paper-plate making machine. Defended the patent. The plates were later branded "Chinet", and the company is currently owned by Huhtamäki.
