= Stoddard, New Hampshire =

- Town
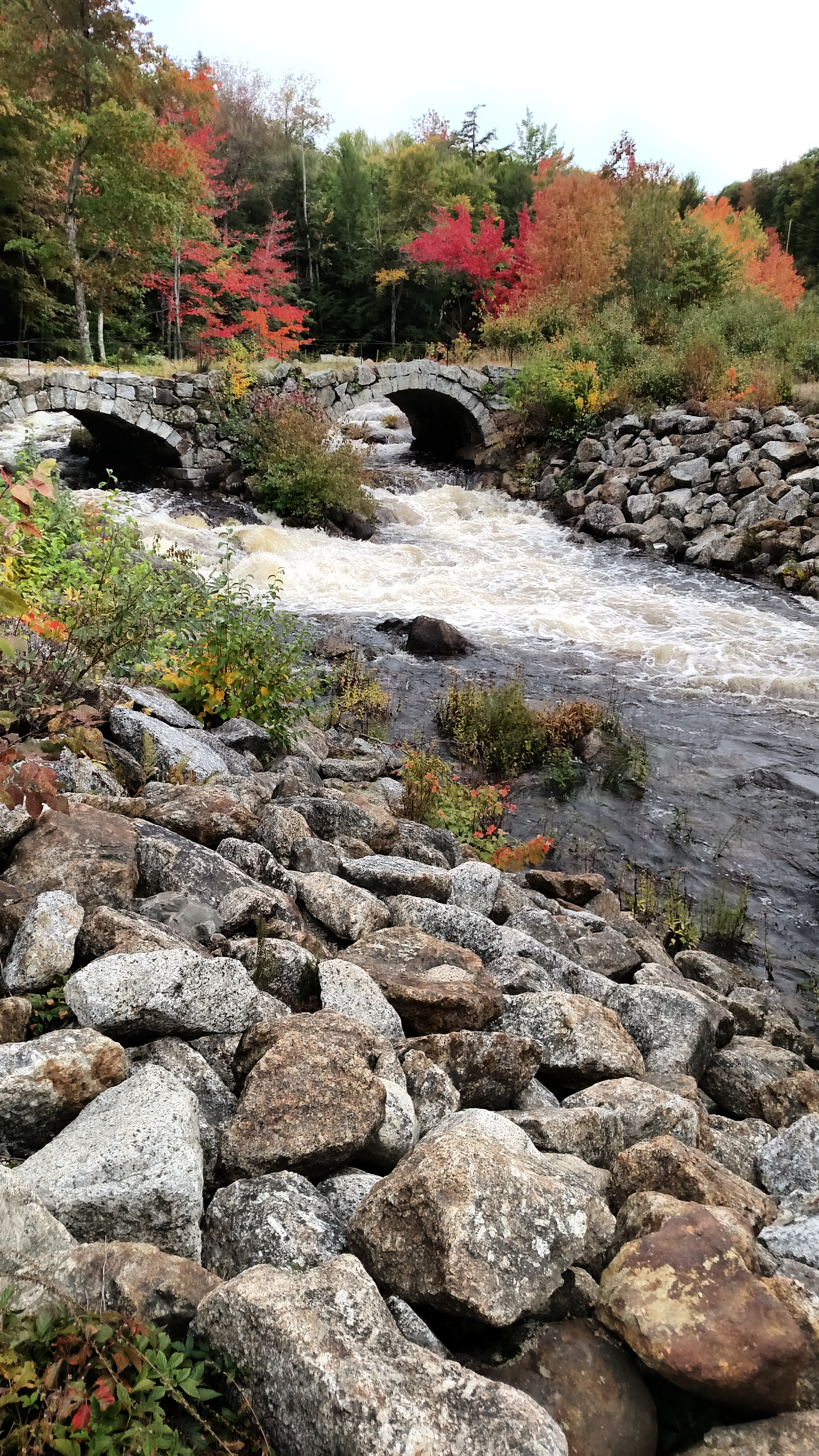
- Stone Arch Bridge

- Seal

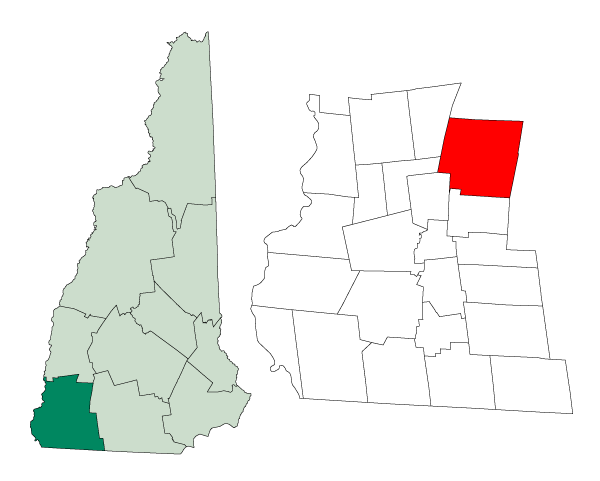
- Location in Cheshire County, New Hampshire
- Coordinates: 43°04′40″N 72°06′54″W
- Country: United States
- State: New Hampshire
- County: Cheshire
- Incorporated: 1774
- Villages: Stoddard; Mill Village

Area
  - Total: 53.1 sq mi (137.4 km^{2})
  - Land: 50.9 sq mi (131.9 km^{2})
  - Water: 2.1 sq mi (5.5 km^{2}) 3.99%
- Elevation: 1,411 ft (430 m)

Population (2020)
  - Total: 1,374
  - Density: 27/sq mi (10.4/km^{2})
- Time zone: UTC-5 (Eastern)
  - Summer (DST): UTC-4 (Eastern)
- ZIP codes: 03464 (Stoddard); 03457 (Nelson)
- Area code: 603
- FIPS code: 33-73700
- GNIS feature ID: 873725
- Website: www.stoddardnh.org

Stoddard is a town in Cheshire County, New Hampshire, United States. The population was 1,374 at the 2020 census, up from 1,232 at the 2010 census, and was an estimated 1,468 in 2025.

Between 1842 and 1873, the town was home to four glass manufacturers. The glass produced by these works, now known as Stoddard glass, is noted for its deep amber colors and design. Stoddard glass products are highly prized by collectors.

== History ==
This territory was first granted in 1752 to Colonel Sampson Stoddard of Chelmsford, Massachusetts, and others as "Monadnock Number 7". It was known locally as "Limerick" before being incorporated as Stoddard in 1774, in honor of Colonel Stoddard.

Colonel Stoddard was appointed to survey southwestern New Hampshire by the colonial government, receiving several land grants for the service. One of his surveying assistants was Benjamin Pierce, father of U.S. President Franklin Pierce. Colonel Stoddard never lived in the town of Stoddard.

The town was first settled in 1768 by John and Martha Taggart, immigrants from Derry, Ireland. Three years later, the Richardson family joined the Taggarts in Stoddard. By 1774, the town had 24 residents.

The first census taken in Stoddard, in 1790, reported 701 residents. The town's first schoolhouses were built in 1792. The first post office was established in 1822; Isaac Duncan was the first Postmaster.

In 1800, Stoddard's 1,148 residents outnumbered those of the nearby county seat of Keene. During Stoddard's glass-manufacturing years, 800 people were employed by the industry. After the Stoddard glass industry ended in the early 1870s, the town's population declined; by 1960, the census recorded 146 residents. As of 2010, the town had 1,232 residents.

=== Stoddard glass ===
Between 1840 and 1873, Stoddard was a center of glass manufacturing, home to four glass factories whose products are prized by collectors today. The town's abundant forests fed the industry's need for the 1,200 °F (650 °C) temperatures necessary to melt sand into glass. Stoddard also had plenty of clear, fine sand. The sand's trace minerals gave Stoddard glass its unique hues: manganese produced the olive green and amber colors most closely associated with Stoddard glass, and oxide of gold created a red-amber glass.

The glass houses were located in two settlements within Stoddard: Joseph Foster's and the South Stoddard Glass Company were located in South Stoddard, which was located near the present-day intersection of state Routes 9 and 123. The Granite Glass Company and the New Granite Glass Works were located in Mill Village, near the present town center.

Among the wide variety of glass pieces turned out by the glass houses were Masonic flasks, containers for liquor and patent medicines, and bottles for mineral water bottled in Saratoga Springs, New York. However, the fame of Stoddard glass does not come primarily from these commercial items, but from the "off-blown" pieces made by glassblowers at the end of the workday using leftover glass. These items, sometimes called "whimseys", could be anything desired by the glassblower, and were the property of the glassblower.

Several factors led to the demise of Stoddard's glass industry in the early 1870s. Other manufacturers had mastered the chemistry needed to create clear glass in quantity; gas and coal were now viable fuels for glassworks, eliminating the need for nearby forests; and improvements in mechanical manufacturing techniques made hand-blown glass economically unviable. The silica in Stoddard's sand prevented its use in making clear glass, which was in high demand after it became viable for bottles and glassware following the Civil War.

== Geography ==
According to the United States Census Bureau, the town has a total area of 53.1 square miles (137.4 km^{2}), of which 50.9 square miles (131.9 km^{2}) are land and 2.1 square miles (5.5 km^{2}) are water, comprising 3.99% of the town. The western portion of the town is drained by tributaries of the Ashuelot River, which flows to the Connecticut River. The central and eastern portions of town drain to the North Branch of the Contoocook River and eventually to the Merrimack River. Major water bodies in the town include Highland Lake and Island Pond in the northeast and Granite Lake on the southern border.

The Monadnock-Sunapee Greenway passes through the western side of the town (near Center Pond) and continues onward toward the highest point in Stoddard, the summit of Pitcher Mountain (at 2,162 feet (659 m) above sea level).

The town is crossed by New Hampshire Route 9 from northeast to southwest, and by New Hampshire Route 123, which passes through the town center, from southeast to northwest.

=== Adjacent municipalities ===
Historical population
Census	Pop.	Note	%±
1790	701		—
1800	1,148		63.8%
1810	1,132		−1.4%
1820	1,203		6.3%
1830	1,159		−3.7%
1840	1,006		−13.2%
1850	1,105		9.8%
1860	944		−14.6%
1870	667		−29.3%
1880	553		−17.1%
1890	400		−27.7%
1900	367		−8.2%
1910	257		−30.0%
1920	213		−17.1%
1930	113		−46.9%
1940	218		92.9%
1950	200		−8.3%
1960	146		−27.0%
1970	242		65.8%
1980	482		99.2%
1990	622		29.0%
2000	928		49.2%
2010	1,232		32.8%
2020	1,374		11.5%
2024 (est.)	1,449		5.5%
U.S. Decennial Census

- Washington (north)
- Windsor (northeast)
- Antrim (east)
- Nelson (south)
- Sullivan (southwest)
- Gilsum (west)
- Marlow (northwest)

== Demographics ==
As of the census of 2000, there were 928 people, 400 households, and 268 families residing in the town. The population density was 18.2 people per square mile (7.0/km^{2}). There were 939 housing units at an average density of 18.5 per square mile (7.1/km^{2}). The racial makeup of the town was 96.88% White, 0.32% African American, 1.29% Native American, 0.43% Asian, 0.11% Pacific Islander, 0.22% from other races, and 0.75% from two or more races. Hispanic or Latino of any race were 0.54% of the population.

There were 400 households, out of which 22.8% had children under the age of 18 living with them, 58.5% were married couples living together, 4.3% had a female householder with no husband present, and 33.0% were non-families. 25.3% of all households were made up of individuals, and 9.3% had someone living alone who was 65 years of age or older. The average household size was 2.32 and the average family size was 2.76.

In the town, the population was spread out, with 20.2% under the age of 18, 4.6% from 18 to 24, 29.5% from 25 to 44, 30.6% from 45 to 64, and 15.1% who were 65 years of age or older. The median age was 43 years. For every 100 females, there were 104.9 males. For every 100 females age 18 and over, there were 102.5 males.

The median income for a household in the town was $37,639, and the median income for a family was $48,125. Males had a median income of $31,343 versus $25,227 for females. The per capita income for the town was $19,617. About 5.3% of families and 8.6% of the population were below the poverty line, including 10.3% of those under age 18 and 10.8% of those age 65 or over.

== Education ==
Residents of Stoddard attending public high and middle schools go to Keene High School and Keene Middle School, respectively, in Keene. Public elementary school students attend James M. Faulkner Elementary School in Stoddard.

== See also ==
- New Hampshire Historical Marker No. 27: Stone Arch Bridge
- New Hampshire Historical Marker No. 52: Stoddard Glass
