= Sally Rogers (artist) =

American painter

Sally Rogers (c. 1790 – 1813) was an early 19th-century painter who worked holding the brush in her mouth, as she was born without arms or legs. She was born in Lempster, New Hampshire to a "poor but respectable" family. In order to earn a living, she became "an itinerant painter and show woman," traveling from her home in 1807 to Northampton, Massachusetts and Hartford, Connecticut on the way to New York City. Edward Savage's Columbian Gallery in New York City, where she was known as Miss Sally Rogers, "the armless paper cutter," exhibited her and her work. It was at this point that the emphasis moved from her as a person needing charity to her talent as an artist, and she stopped using Sally and became known as Sarah Rogers. She also made a second visit to the gallery, when people were able to commission works from her. After New York City, she traveled to Philadelphia, where, in 1811, the Society of Artists in the United States, formed the previous year by Charles Willson Peale and other painters, had their first exhibition. Entry #340 was "Landscape, painted by holding the brush in the mouth, Miss Sarah Rogers." Two years later, the exhibition catalog listed two works by Sarah Rogers, "St. Scholastic (drawing or water color)" and "Mount Sidney, seat of John Barker, Esq., painted without the use of her hands (water color)." William Hamilton, whose estate The Woodlands was in West Philadelphia, purchased and donated to Peale's Philadelphia Museum, a drawing of flowers by Rogers. She also donated works to the museum. After Philadelphia, she continued on to Baltimore, Washington, DC, Alexandria and Norfolk, Virginia, and Charleston, South Carolina, before returning to Philadelphia. She died in Philadelphia in 1813, age 23.
