= Windsor, New Hampshire =

- Town
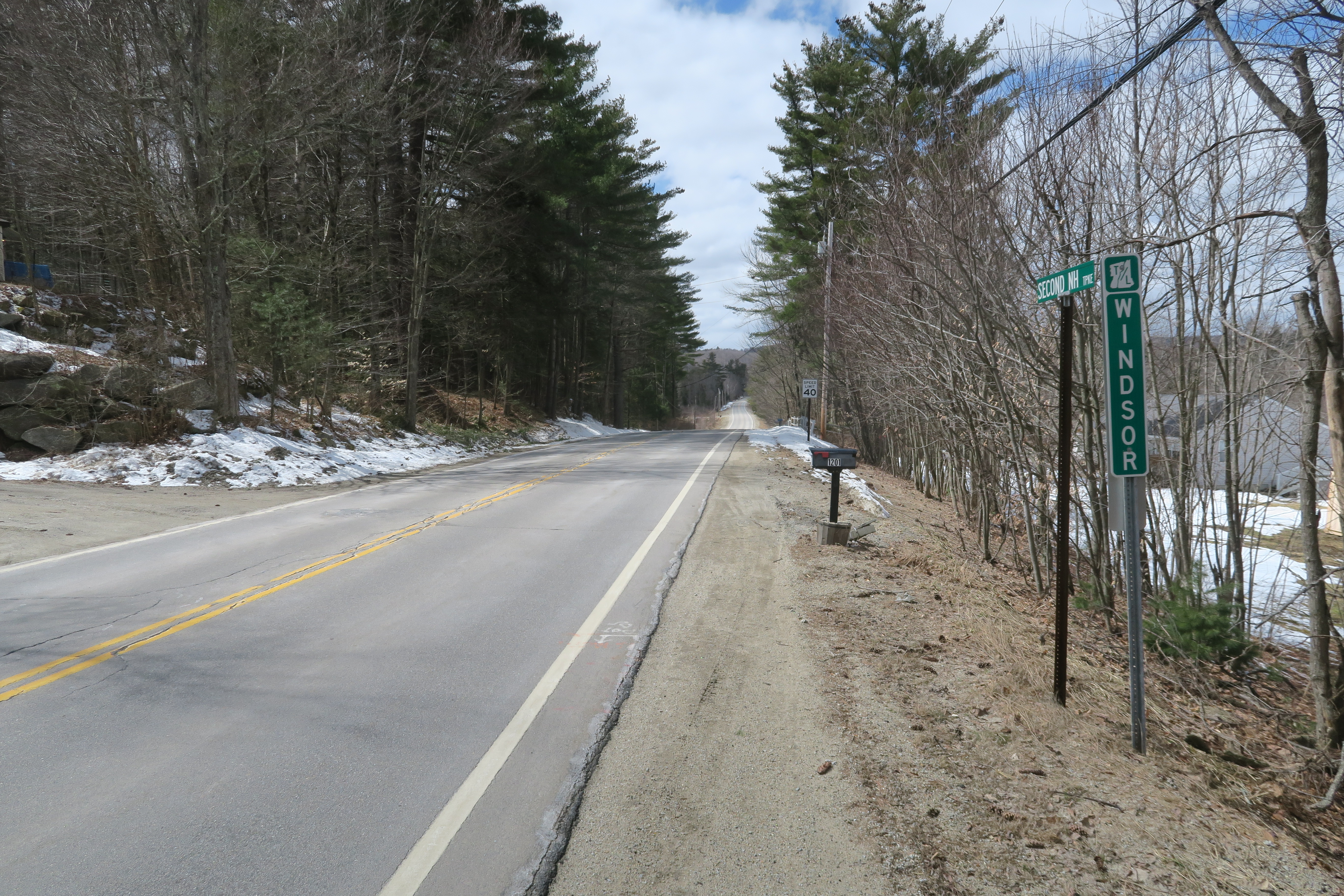
- New Hampshire Route 31 northbound entering Windsor

- Seal

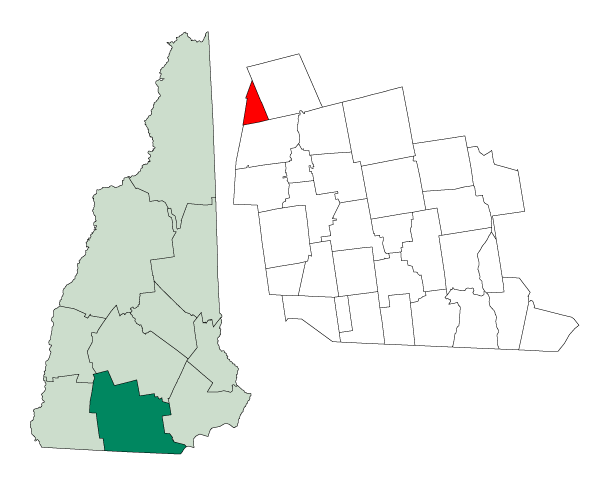
- Location in Hillsborough County, New Hampshire
- Coordinates: 43°08′33″N 72°01′33″W
- Country: United States
- State: New Hampshire
- County: Hillsborough
- Incorporated: 1798

Government
  - Board of Selectmen: Darlene Cuddy, Chair; Gerald Needham; Sean O'Keefe

Area
  - Total: 8.5 sq mi (22.1 km^{2})
  - Land: 8.3 sq mi (21.4 km^{2})
  - Water: 0.27 sq mi (0.7 km^{2}) 3.15%
- Elevation: 974 ft (297 m)

Population (2020)
  - Total: 262
  - Density: 32/sq mi (12.3/km^{2})
- Time zone: UTC-5 (Eastern)
  - Summer (DST): UTC-4 (Eastern)
- ZIP code: 03244
- Area code: 603
- FIPS code: 33-85940
- GNIS feature ID: 0873759
- Website: windsornh.org

Windsor is a town in Hillsborough County, New Hampshire, United States. The population was 262 at the 2020 census. It is the location of the Wediko Children's Services Summer Program and of Windsor Mountain International, a summer adventure and travel camp founded in 1961. It is also the home of Windsor Hills Camp and Retreat Center, a ministry of the Church of the Nazarene.

== History ==
Incorporated in 1798, Windsor takes its name from Windsor, Connecticut, the home town of grantee John Campbell. The town was made from the land that was left over from the surrounding Hillsborough County. Previously, the land was called "Campbell's Gore" as named for the aforementioned John Campbell.

== Geography ==
According to the United States Census Bureau, the town has a total area of 8.5 square miles (22.1 km^{2}), of which 8.3 square miles (21.4 km^{2}) are land and 0.3 square miles (0.7 km^{2}) are water, comprising 3.15% of the town. The highest point is the summit of Windsor Mountain, at 1,604 feet (489 m) above sea level.

=== Adjacent municipalities ===
- Washington (northwest)
- Hillsborough (east)
- Antrim (south)
- Stoddard (southwest)

== Demographics ==
Historical population
Census	Pop.	Note	%±
1790	120		—
1800	249		107.5%
1810	238		−4.4%
1820	237		−0.4%
1830	226		−4.6%
1840	177		−21.7%
1850	172		−2.8%
1860	136		−20.9%
1870	81		−40.4%
1880	420		418.5%
1890	62		−85.2%
1900	38		−38.7%
1910	24		−36.8%
1920	21		−12.5%
1930	22		4.8%
1940	29		31.8%
1950	27		−6.9%
1960	35		29.6%
1970	43		22.9%
1980	72		67.4%
1990	107		48.6%
2000	201		87.9%
2010	224		11.4%
2020	262		17.0%
2024 (est.)	274		4.6%
U.S. Decennial Census

As of the census of 2000, there were 201 people, 58 households, and 37 families residing in the town. The population density was 24.1 people per square mile (9.3/km^{2}). There were 120 housing units at an average density of 14.4 per square mile (5.6/km^{2}). The racial makeup of the town was 97.01% White, 1.49% African American, and 1.49% from two or more races. Hispanic or Latino of any race were 0.50% of the population.

There were 58 households, out of which 29.3% had children under the age of 18 living with them, 53.4% were married couples living together, 3.4% had a female householder with no husband present, and 34.5% were non-families. 25.9% of all households were made up of individuals, and 8.6% had someone living alone who was 65 years of age or older. The average household size was 2.40 and the average family size was 2.89.

In the town, the population was spread out, with 33.8% under the age of 18, 14.4% from 18 to 24, 22.9% from 25 to 44, 23.9% from 45 to 64, and 5.0% who were 65 years of age or older. The median age was 26 years. For every 100 females, there were 187.1 males. For every 100 females age 18 and over, there were 114.5 males.

The median income for a household in the town was $45,750, and the median income for a family was $58,750. Males had a median income of $36,250 versus $13,750 for females. The per capita income for the town was $17,966. About 11.8% of families and 12.3% of the population were below the poverty line, including 32.4% of those under the age of eighteen and none of those 65 or over.

== Government and politics ==
Windsor town presidential vote
Year	Democratic	Republican	Third parties
2024	22.73% 30	77.27% 102	
2020	25.58% 33	70.54% 91	3.88% 5
2016	22.4% 28	75.2% 94	2.4% 3
2012	39.45% 43	60.55% 6	
2008	52.76% 67	46.46% 59	0.79% 1

Windsor is located in New Hampshire's 2nd congressional district represented by Democrat Maggie Goodlander (D-Nashua). In the New Hampshire Senate, Windsor is located within New Hampshire's 8th State Senate district, represented by Republican Ruth Ward (R-Stoddard).

In the New Hampshire House of Representatives, Windsor is located entirely in Hillsborough's 30th district, which is represented by three Republicans: Riché Colcombe, Jim Creighton and Jim Fedolfi.

After backing Barack Obama by 6 points in 2008, when he won with a margin of 8 votes, Windsor has become strongly Republican, becoming New Hampshire's most Republican town (excluding unincorporated locations, grants and townships). In 2012, the town swung 27 percent towards Mitt Romney. The town was Donald Trump's strongest town in the state in all three of his elections, backing him with a 53-point margin in 2016, 45-point margin in 2020 and 54.5-point margin in 2024.
