= North Branch Contoocook River =

North Branch Contoocook River North Branch River
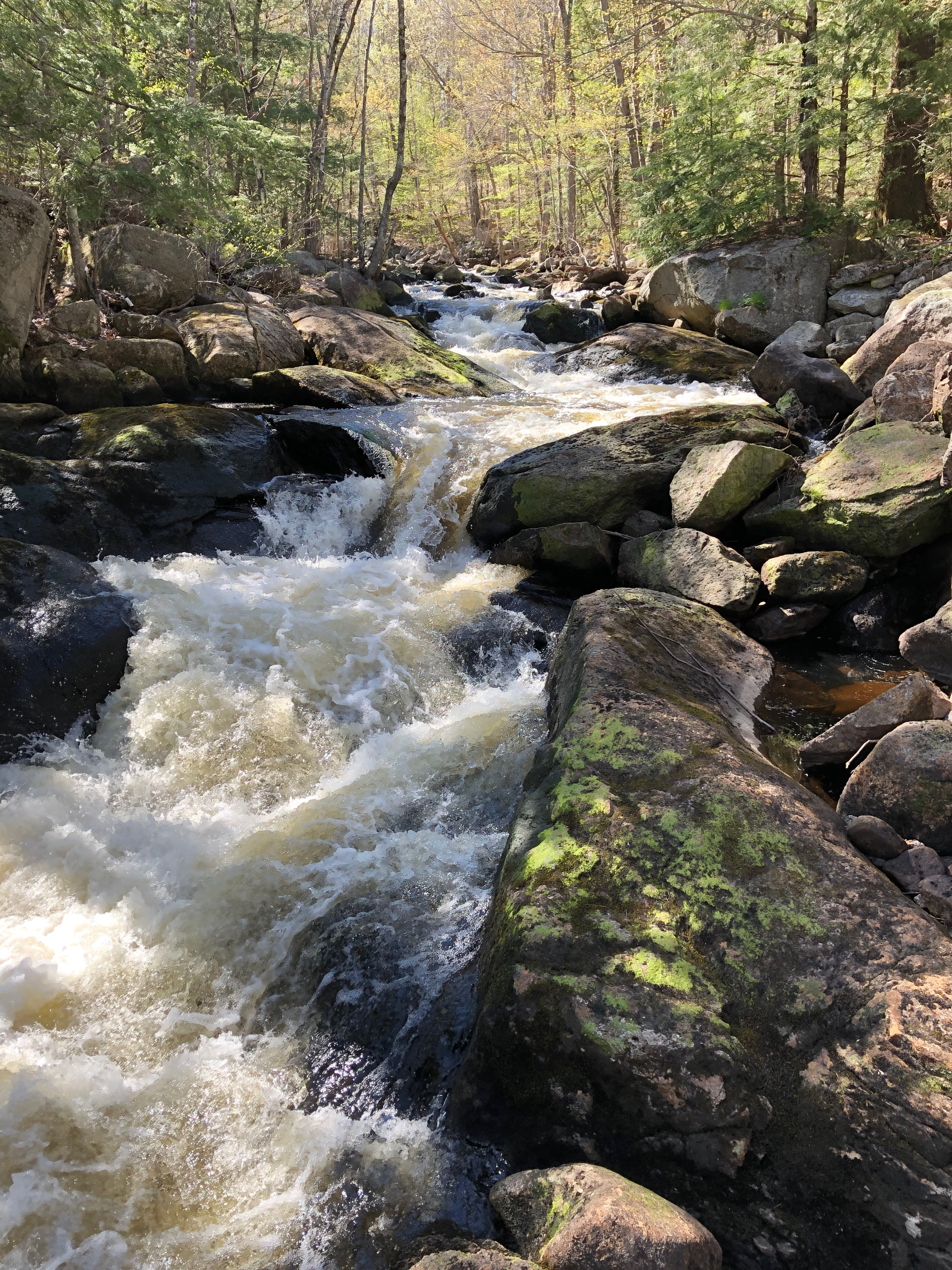
- The North Branch at Loveren's Mill, Antrim, NH

- Location within New Hampshire Location within the United States

Location
- Country: United States
- State: New Hampshire
- Counties: Cheshire, Hillsborough
- Towns: Stoddard, Antrim, Hillsborough

Physical characteristics
- Source: Robb Reservoir
  - location: Stoddard
  - coordinates: 43°2′21″N 72°4′4″W
  - elevation: 1,266 ft (386 m)
- Mouth: Contoocook River
  - location: Hillsborough
  - coordinates: 43°6′27″N 71°54′35″W
  - elevation: 585 ft (178 m)
- Length: 16.8 mi (27.0 km)

Basin features
- Tributaries
  - left: Morse Brook, Beards Brook
  - right: Salmon Brook

The North Branch of the Contoocook River (officially the North Branch River) is a 16.8-mile-long (27.0 km) river in southwestern New Hampshire in the United States. It is a tributary of the Contoocook River, part of the Merrimack River watershed.

The North Branch begins in a highland region of lakes, swamps, and intricate stream networks in the town of Stoddard, New Hampshire. The U.S. Geographic Names Information System places the beginning of the North Branch at the outlet of Robb Reservoir in the southeast corner of Stoddard. Additional significant flow quickly arrives when the outlet of Highland Lake and Island Pond joins from the north. From here to Franklin Pierce Lake, the North Branch consists of a stairstep-like series of flatwater and wetland sections interspersed with sections of whitewater that are popular among New England kayakers. Below Franklin Pierce Lake it is a short distance to the Contoocook River in Hillsborough. Beards Brook enters the North Branch in Hillsborough just upstream of the river's end at the Contoocook.

New Hampshire Route 9 follows the North Branch for most of the river's length.

== See also ==
- List of rivers of New Hampshire
