= Beards Brook =

- Location within New Hampshire Location within the United States

Location
- Country: United States
- State: New Hampshire
- Counties: Sullivan, Hillsborough
- Towns: Washington, Hillsborough

Physical characteristics
- Source: Island Pond
  - location: Washington, Sullivan County
  - coordinates: 43°10′17″N 72°3′33″W
  - elevation: 1,404 ft (428 m)
- Mouth: North Branch Contoocook River
  - location: Hillsborough, Hillsborough County
  - coordinates: 43°6′45″N 71°55′29″W
  - elevation: 598 ft (182 m)
- Length: 12.5 mi (20.1 km)

Basin features
- Tributaries
  - left: Woodward Brook
  - right: Shedd Brook

Beards Brook or Beard Brook is a 12.5-mile-long (20.1 km) stream located in southern New Hampshire in the United States. It is a tributary of the North Branch of the Contoocook River, part of the Merrimack River watershed.

Beards Brook begins at the outlet of Island Pond in the town of Washington, New Hampshire. The brook descends rapidly northeast to the village of East Washington, then turns south and enters Hillsborough. A significant tributary is Shedd Brook, entering from the west in Hillsborough. Beards Brook joins the North Branch of the Contoocook near Hillsborough village, just upstream of the Contoocook River.

== See also ==
- List of rivers of New Hampshire
