= Marlow, New Hampshire =

- Town
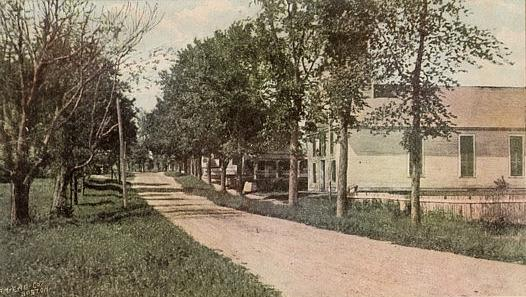
- Main Street in 1907

- Seal

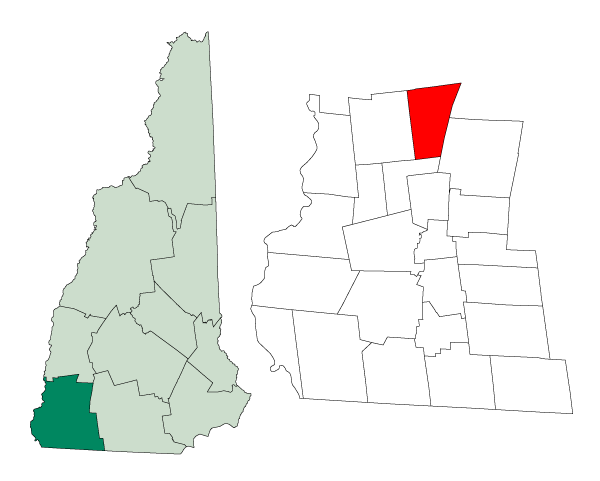
- Location in Cheshire County, New Hampshire
- Coordinates: 43°07′51″N 72°12′54″W
- Country: United States
- State: New Hampshire
- County: Cheshire
- Incorporated: 1761
- Communities: Marlow; Baker Corner; Gee Mill; Marlow Hill; Marlow Junction

Area
  - Total: 26.4 sq mi (68.5 km^{2})
  - Land: 26.0 sq mi (67.3 km^{2})
  - Water: 0.46 sq mi (1.2 km^{2}) 1.78%
- Elevation: 1,342 ft (409 m)

Population (2020)
  - Total: 749
  - Density: 29/sq mi (11.1/km^{2})
- Time zone: UTC-5 (Eastern)
  - Summer (DST): UTC-4 (Eastern)
- ZIP code: 03456
- Area code: 603
- FIPS code: 33-45700
- GNIS feature ID: 873660
- Website: www.marlownh.gov

Marlow is a town in Cheshire County, New Hampshire, United States. The population was 749 at the 2020 census, and an estimated 773 in 2025. Marlow is home to Honey Brook State Forest.

== History ==
The town was first granted in 1753 by colonial Governor Benning Wentworth as "Addison", after Joseph Addison, writer and for a time under-secretary of state for England. Addison had signed the appointment papers making the governor's father, John Wentworth, lieutenant-governor of New Hampshire in 1717. As a result of the French and Indian War, few original grantees settled here, so it was regranted on October 7, 1761, to William Noyes and 69 others, the majority from Lyme, Connecticut. The town was named after Marlow, England, located on the River Thames in Buckinghamshire.

Marlow bears many marks of glacial action, and minerals are still found here. A woodworking industry once used the water power of the Ashuelot River to produce tools, furniture and wooden buckets from lumber cut nearby. By 1859, when the population was 708, there were seven sawmills, a gristmill, a carriage shop, a tin shop, and two tanneries. Although the town's undulating surface is somewhat rocky, farmers produced hay, grain and vegetables.

Marlow was the original home of PC Connection, now just called 'Connection'.

== Geography ==
According to the United States Census Bureau, the town has a total area of 26.4 square miles (68.5 km^{2}), of which 26.0 square miles (67.3 km^{2}) are land and 0.46 square miles (1.2 km^{2}) are water, comprising 1.78% of the town. Marlow is drained by the Ashuelot River, part of the Connecticut River watershed. The town's highest point is in its northeastern corner, at the summit of Huntley Mountain, where the elevation reaches 1,978 feet (603 m) above sea level.

Marlow is served by state routes 10, 123, and a small portion of the northern segment of Route 123A. Route 10 leads north to Newport and south to Keene, Route 123 leads east to Stoddard and west to Alstead, and Route 123A leads northwest from Route 10 into the town of Acworth.

=== Adjacent municipalities ===
- Lempster (north)
- Washington (northeast)
- Stoddard (east)
- Gilsum (south)
- Alstead (west)
- Acworth (northwest)

== Demographics ==
Historical population
Census	Pop.	Note	%±
1790	313		—
1800	543		73.5%
1810	566		4.2%
1820	597		5.5%
1830	645		8.0%
1840	626		−2.9%
1850	708		13.1%
1860	813		14.8%
1870	716		−11.9%
1880	701		−2.1%
1890	584		−16.7%
1900	488		−16.4%
1910	425		−12.9%
1920	401		−5.6%
1930	330		−17.7%
1940	288		−12.7%
1950	330		14.6%
1960	350		6.1%
1970	390		11.4%
1980	542		39.0%
1990	650		19.9%
2000	747		14.9%
2010	742		−0.7%
2020	749		0.9%
2024 (est.)	774		3.3%
U.S. Decennial Census

As of the census of 2000, there were 747 people, 292 households, and 221 families residing in the town. The population density was 28.8 inhabitants per square mile (11.1/km^{2}). There were 396 housing units at an average density of 15.3 per square mile (5.9/km^{2}). The racial makeup of the town was 98.80% White, 0.13% Native American, and 1.07% from two or more races. Hispanic or Latino of any race were 1.07% of the population.

There were 292 households, out of which 33.2% had children under the age of 18 living with them, 67.1% were married couples living together, 5.5% had a female householder with no husband present, and 24.0% were non-families. 17.1% of all households were made up of individuals, and 6.8% had someone living alone who was 65 years of age or older. The average household size was 2.56 and the average family size was 2.89.

In the town, the population was spread out, with 24.9% under the age of 18, 5.9% from 18 to 24, 27.6% from 25 to 44, 28.5% from 45 to 64, and 13.1% who were 65 years of age or older. The median age was 40 years. For every 100 females, there were 105.8 males. For every 100 females age 18 and over, there were 102.5 males.

The median income for a household in the town was $45,000, and the median income for a family was $47,813. Males had a median income of $29,653 versus $22,273 for females. The per capita income for the town was $18,810. About 2.7% of families and 4.1% of the population were below the poverty line, including 5.1% of those under age 18 and 4.9% of those age 65 or over.

== Notable people ==
- Osman Cleander Baker (1812–1871), biblical scholar, bishop
- Stephen Mack (1766–1826), merchant, patriot, politician; brother of Lucy Mack Smith
