= Washington, New Hampshire =

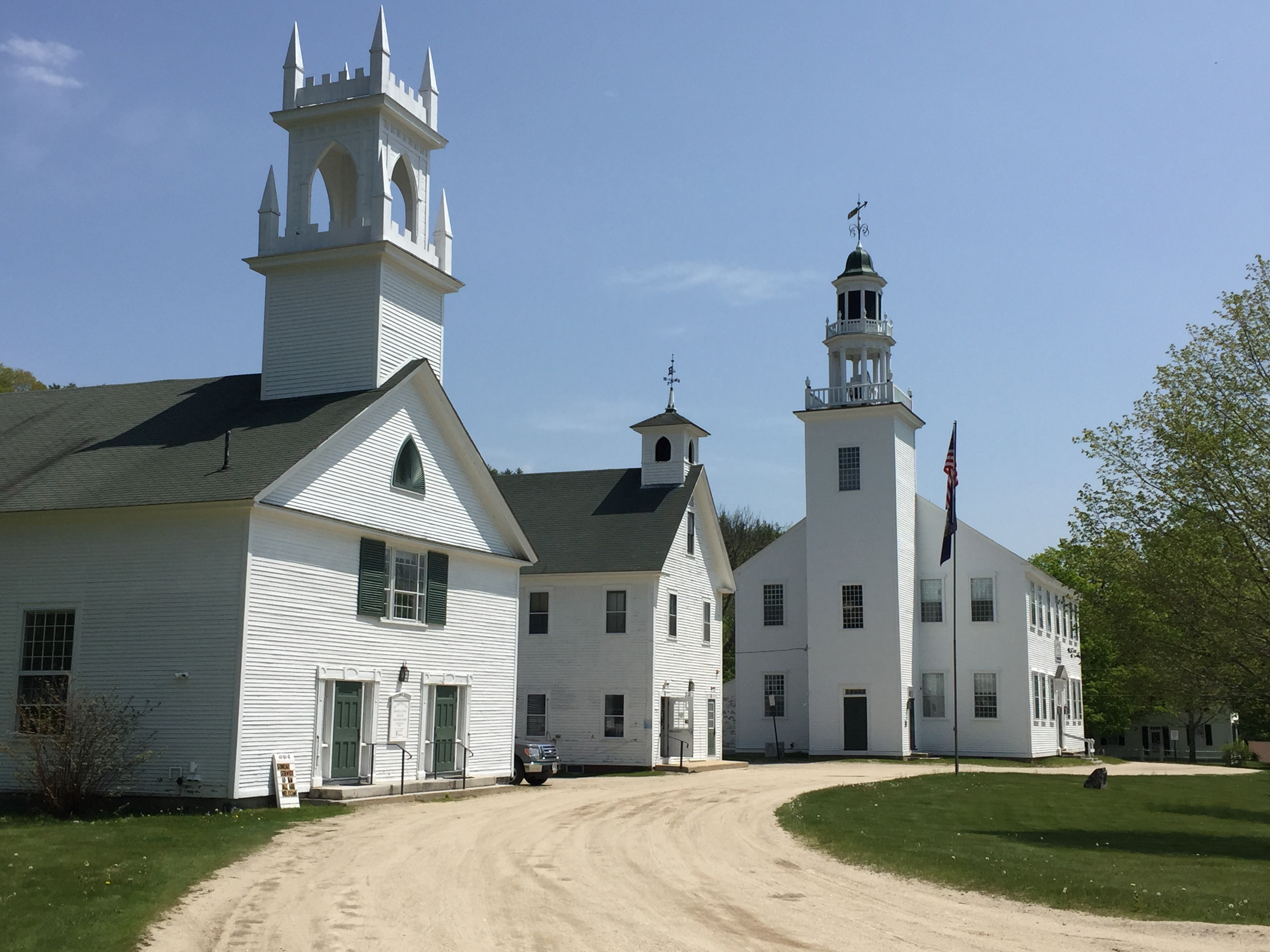
- Washington Congregational Church, Center School, and Town Hall (from left)

- Location in Sullivan County and the state of New Hampshire
- Coordinates: 43°10′35″N 72°05′51″W
- Country: United States
- State: New Hampshire
- County: Sullivan
- Incorporated: 1776
- Villages: Washington; East Washington

Area
  - Total: 47.7 sq mi (123.5 km^{2})
  - Land: 45.7 sq mi (118.4 km^{2})
  - Water: 2.0 sq mi (5.1 km^{2}) 4.16%
- Elevation: 1,507 ft (459 m)

Population (2020)
  - Total: 1,192
  - Density: 26/sq mi (10.1/km^{2})
- Time zone: UTC−5 (Eastern)
  - Summer (DST): UTC−4 (Eastern)
- ZIP code: 03280
- Area code: 603
- FIPS code: 33-78980
- GNIS feature ID: 873747
- Website: www.washington.nh.gov

Washington is a town in Sullivan County, New Hampshire, United States. The population was 1,192 at the 2020 census. Situated in a hilly, rocky, forested area, and with 26 lakes and ponds, Washington is a picturesque resort area. It is home to Pillsbury State Park.

== History ==
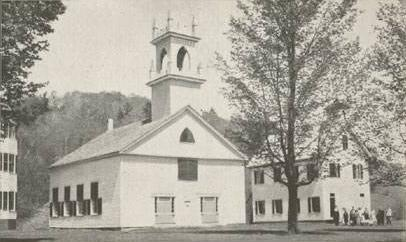
Congregational Church & School c. 1920

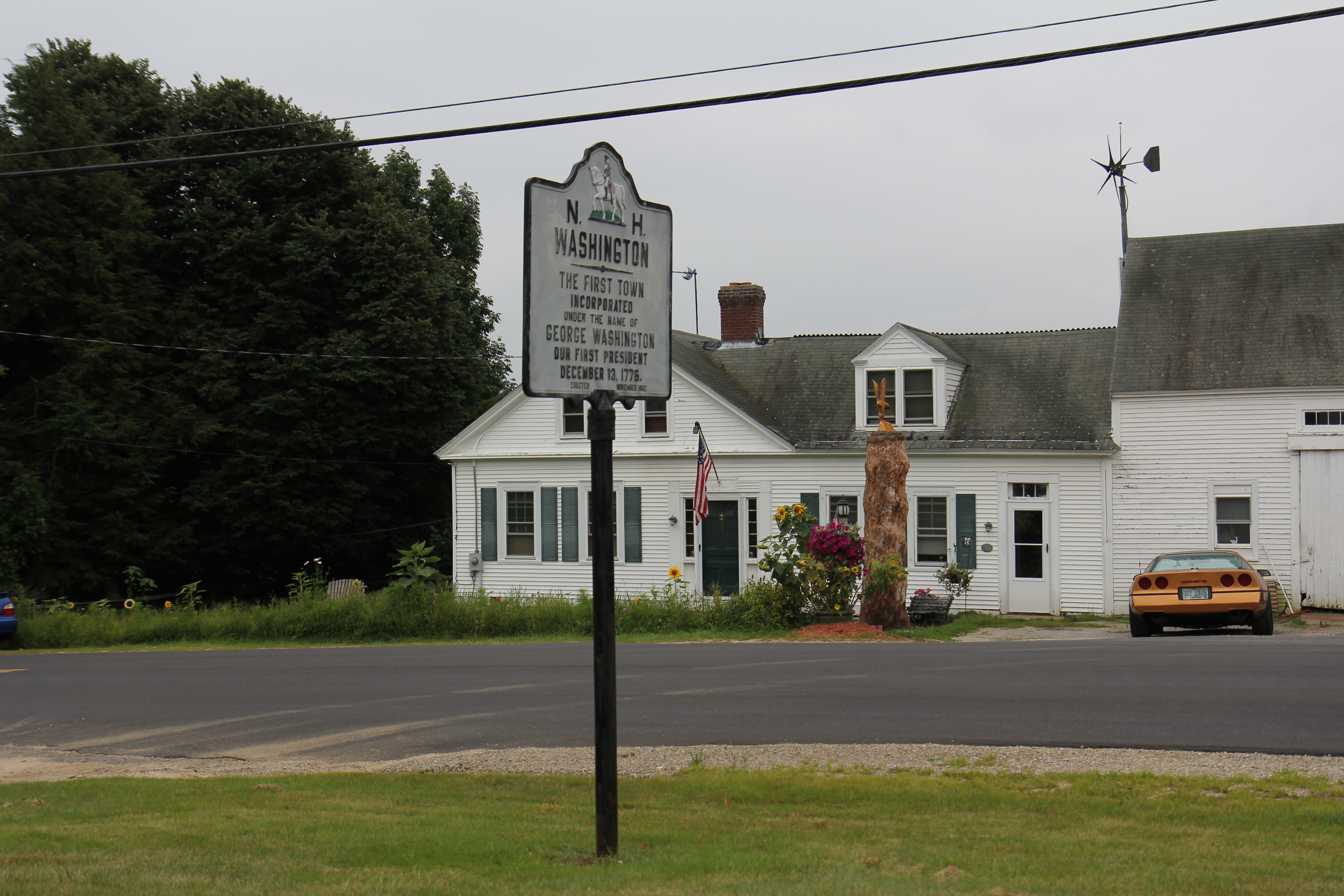
The sign for Washington

Granted in 1735 by colonial governor Jonathan Belcher of Massachusetts, the town was one of the fort towns designated to protect the colonies from Native attack, named "Monadnock Number 8". In 1751, the town was granted by Governor Benning Wentworth as "New Concord". As the grant was never settled, the charter was revoked. Reuben Kidder of New Ipswich acquired the grant, naming it "Camden". The first settlers arrived in 1768 and built log houses. By 1773, the community had 132 inhabitants. On December 13, 1776, the newly established American revolutionary government incorporated the town as "Washington", after George Washington—one of the first named in his honor.

By 1830, the population had grown to 1,135. Using water power from the streams, mills manufactured lumber, barrel staves, shingles, chair parts, bobbins, whip sockets, hosiery, bricks and washboards. Gristmills ground grain. Sheep farms, producing wool and mutton, were an important business. In 1840, there were 200 farms. Tubbs Union Academy was founded in 1849, and although it did not last long, the school once enrolled over 100 students from New Hampshire and beyond. The first Seventh-day Adventist church was established in Washington in 1862. In 1886, the town produced 53 tons of maple sugar.

The railroad era brought tourists, and hotels were built on the lakes and ponds; however, with 19th-century migration to the Midwest, the town's population dwindled. As of 1960, it contained only 162 inhabitants. Washington has since grown, as its scenic environment attracts tourists and retirees. The town contains several examples of early architecture, including the Town Hall, built as a meetinghouse in 1787, the Congregational church built in 1840, and the first Seventh-day Adventist Church built c. 1843.

== Geography ==
According to the United States Census Bureau, Washington has a total area of 47.7 square miles (123.5 km^{2}), of which 45.7 square miles (118.4 km^{2}) are land and 2.0 square miles (5.1 km^{2}) are water, comprising 4.16% of the town. The town sits in a highland area atop a watershed divide. The Ashuelot River, part of the Connecticut River watershed, drains the western side of the town, including Ashuelot Pond in the southwest. Bog Brook drains the center of the town from north to south, flowing into Highland Lake near the southern border. The lake is part of the Contoocook River watershed, as are Beards Brook and Woodward Brook on the eastern side of town, and by the Contoocook River are therefore part of the Merrimack River watershed.

Lovewell Mountain, located northeast of the town center and with an elevation of 2,496 feet (761 m), is the highest point in town. As Edwin A. Charlton writes in New Hampshire As It Is (1855), the mountain "received its name from Captain John Lovewell, who was accustomed to ascend it for the purpose of discovering the wigwams of the Indians, and who, on one occasion, killed seven Indians near its summit." The Washington Town Common, elevation 1,507 feet (459 m), is the highest town center in the state. (The town hall of Clarksville in northern New Hampshire is located at a higher elevation—1,980 feet (600 m)—but there is no other village development there.)

=== Adjacent municipalities ===
- Goshen (north)
- Bradford (northeast)
- Hillsborough (east)
- Windsor (southeast)
- Stoddard (south)
- Marlow (southwest)
- Lempster (northwest)

== Demographics ==
Historical population
Census	Pop.	Note	%±
1790	545		—
1800	819		50.3%
1810	820		0.1%
1820	992		21.0%
1830	1,135		14.4%
1840	1,103		−2.8%
1850	1,053		−4.5%
1860	897		−14.8%
1870	839		−6.5%
1880	682		−18.7%
1890	569		−16.6%
1900	464		−18.5%
1910	360		−22.4%
1920	308		−14.4%
1930	245		−20.5%
1940	278		13.5%
1950	168		−39.6%
1960	162		−3.6%
1970	248		53.1%
1980	411		65.7%
1990	628		52.8%
2000	895		42.5%
2010	1,123		25.5%
2020	1,192		6.1%
U.S. Decennial Census

As of the census of 2000, there were 895 people, 370 households, and 277 families residing in the town. The population density was 19.7 people per square mile (7.6/km^{2}). There were 925 housing units at an average density of 20.4 per square mile (7.9/km^{2}). The racial makeup of the town was 98.21% White, 0.34% Native American, and 1.45% from two or more races. Hispanic or Latino of any race were 1.45% of the population.

There were 370 households, out of which 24.1% had children under the age of 18 living with them, 67.8% were married couples living together, 4.1% had a female householder with no husband present, and 24.9% were non-families. 19.5% of all households were made up of individuals, and 9.5% had someone living alone who was 65 years of age or older. The average household size was 2.42 and the average family size was 2.73.

In the town, the age distribution of the population shows 21.9% under the age of 18, 3.5% from 18 to 24, 24.6% from 25 to 44, 32.2% from 45 to 64, and 17.9% who were 65 years of age or older. The median age was 45 years. For every 100 females, there were 104.8 males. For every 100 females age 18 and over, there were 100.9 males.

The median income for a household in the town was $43,125, and the median income for a family was $50,000. Males had a median income of $34,688 versus $26,333 for females. The per capita income for the town was $20,540. About 3.1% of families and 5.0% of the population were below the poverty line, including 8.1% of those under age 18 and 5.7% of those age 65 or over.

== Notable people ==
- John C. Lord (1805–1877), Presbyterian minister
- Sylvanus Thayer (1785–1872), US Army colonel; known as the "Father of West Point"
- Carroll D. Wright (1840–1909), first US Commissioner of Labor
