= Lempster, New Hampshire =

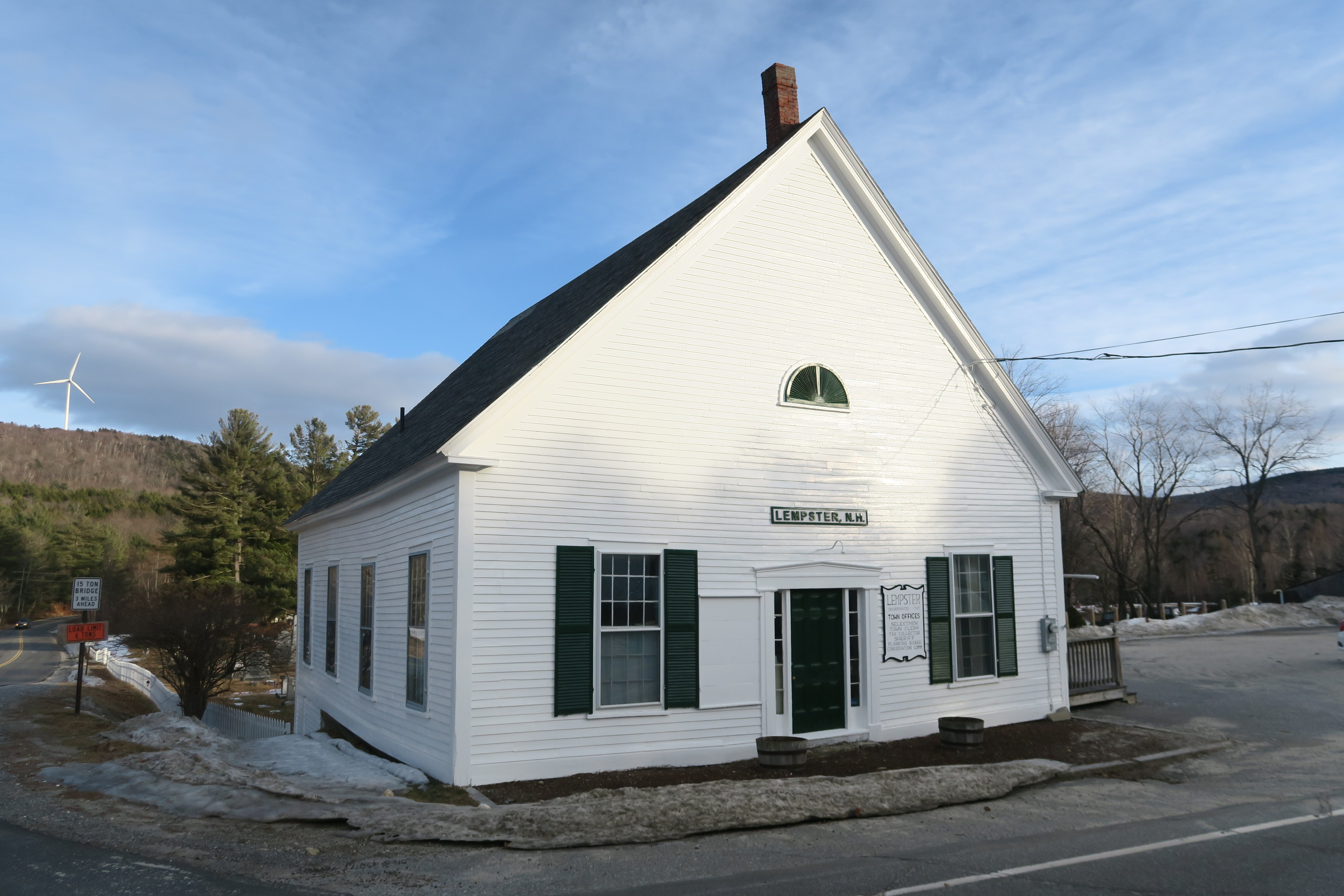
- Lempster town offices

- Seal

- Location in Sullivan County and the state of New Hampshire.
- Coordinates: 43°13′39″N 72°10′53″W
- Country: United States
- State: New Hampshire
- County: Sullivan
- Incorporated: 1772
- Named for: Sir Thomas Fermor, Second Baron Leominster or "Lempster"
- Villages: Lempster; East Lempster

Area
  - Total: 32.7 sq mi (84.8 km^{2})
  - Land: 32.4 sq mi (83.8 km^{2})
  - Water: 0.39 sq mi (1.0 km^{2}) 1.22%
- Elevation: 1,237 ft (377 m)

Population (2020)
  - Total: 1,118
  - Density: 34/sq mi (13.3/km^{2})
- Time zone: UTC-5 (Eastern)
  - Summer (DST): UTC-4 (Eastern)
- ZIP code: 03605
- Area code: 603
- FIPS code: 33-41700
- GNIS feature ID: 873645
- Website: www.lempsternh.org

Lempster is a town in Sullivan County, New Hampshire, United States. The population was 1,118 at the 2020 census. Settlements include the town center (Lempster village) and the village of East Lempster.

== History ==
First granted by colonial governor Jonathan Belcher in 1735 as "Number 9" (ninth in a line of forts to guard against Indian attacks), it was regranted in 1753 as "Dupplin", after Scottish lord Thomas Hay, Viscount Dupplin, by Governor Benning Wentworth. The town was re-granted one final time in 1767 as Lempster, after Sir Thomas Fermor, Second Baron Leominster or "Lempster", and incorporated in 1772.

== Geography ==
According to the United States Census Bureau, the town has a total area of 32.7 square miles (84.8 km^{2}), of which 32.4 square miles (83.8 km^{2}) are land and 0.39 square miles (1.0 km^{2}) is water, comprising 1.22% of the town. The highest point in Lempster is the summit of Bean Mountain, in the eastern part of town at 2,326 feet (709 m) above sea level. Lempster lies entirely within the Connecticut River watershed. The northern section of town is drained by Giles Brook, which flows north to the South Branch of the Sugar River, reaching the Connecticut River at Claremont. The western side of town is drained by the Cold River and its tributary, Dodge Brook, reaching the Connecticut in Walpole. The southeastern part of town is drained by the Ashuelot River, which flows southwest and reaches the Connecticut River at Hinsdale.

New Hampshire Route 10 traverses the town, connecting it with Goshen and Newport to the north and with Marlow, Gilsum, and Keene to the south. The village of East Lempster is located at the intersection of Route 10 and Second New Hampshire Turnpike. The village of Lempster proper is located along Second New Hampshire Turnpike, 2 miles (3 km) to the west.

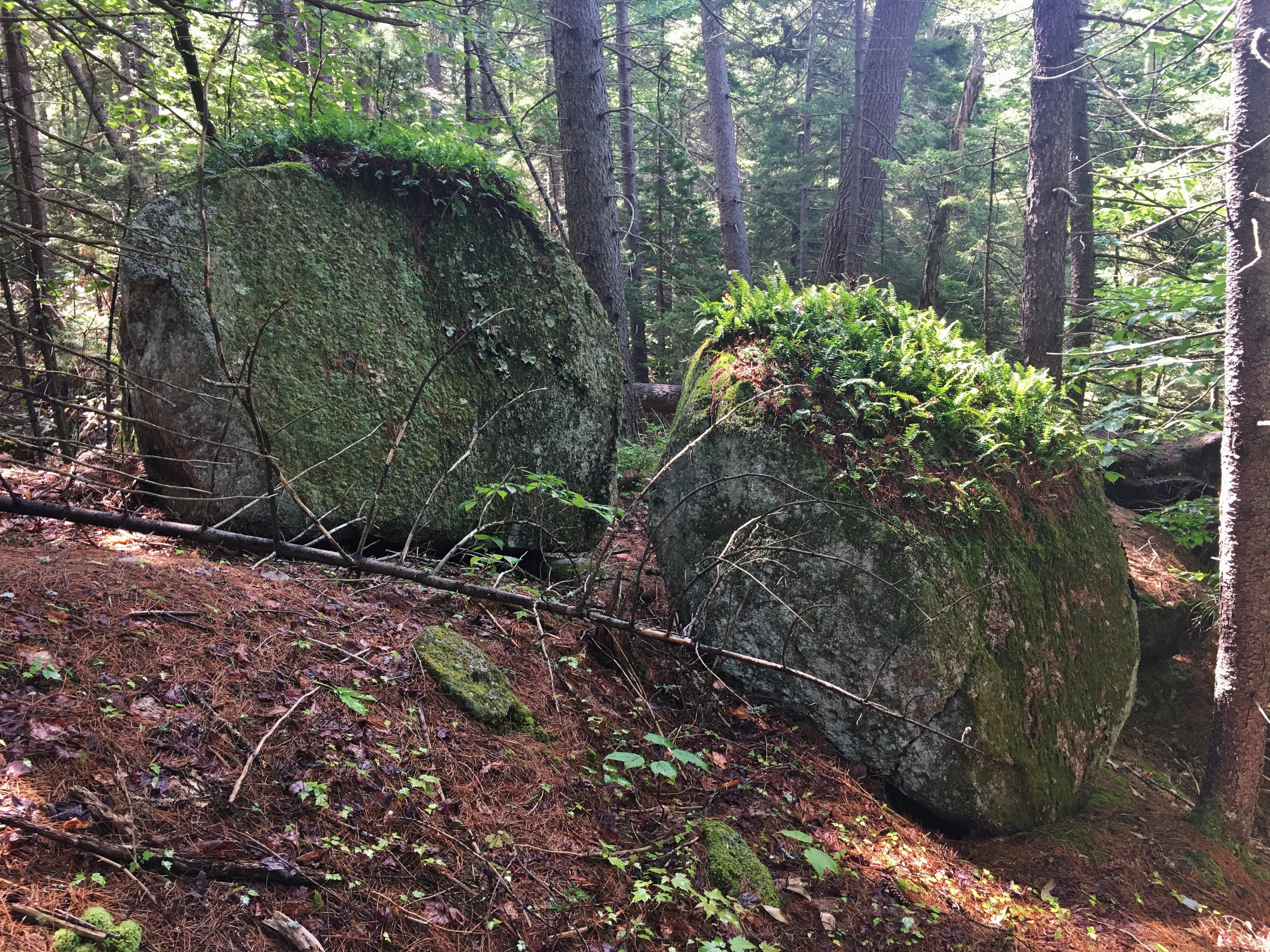
Twin boulders near the community, likely moved by glaciers

=== Adjacent municipalities ===
- Unity (north)
- Goshen (northeast)
- Washington (east)
- Marlow (south)
- Acworth (west)

== Demographics ==
Historical population
Census	Pop.	Note	%±
1790	415		—
1800	729		75.7%
1810	854		17.1%
1820	950		11.2%
1830	999		5.2%
1840	941		−5.8%
1850	906		−3.7%
1860	820		−9.5%
1870	678		−17.3%
1880	602		−11.2%
1890	519		−13.8%
1900	391		−24.7%
1910	383		−2.0%
1920	287		−25.1%
1930	273		−4.9%
1940	312		14.3%
1950	309		−1.0%
1960	272		−12.0%
1970	360		32.4%
1980	637		76.9%
1990	947		48.7%
2000	971		2.5%
2010	1,154		18.8%
2020	1,118		−3.1%
U.S. Decennial Census

As of the census of 2000, there were 971 people, 387 households, and 275 families residing in the town. The 2003 census estimate for the town was 1,044 residents. The population density was 30.0 inhabitants per square mile (11.6/km^{2}). There were 577 housing units at an average density of 17.8 per square mile (6.9/km^{2}). The racial makeup of the town was 97.22% White, 0.10% Native American, 0.10% Asian, 0.10% Pacific Islander, and 2.47% from two or more races. Hispanic or Latino of any race were 0.21% of the population.

There were 387 households, out of which 30.5% had children under the age of 18 living with them, 59.9% were married couples living together, 7.2% had a female householder with no husband present, and 28.7% were non-families. 22.0% of all households were made up of individuals, and 9.6% had someone living alone who was 65 years of age or older. The average household size was 2.51 and the average family size was 2.90.

In the town, the population was spread out, with 24.3% under the age of 18, 5.3% from 18 to 24, 28.4% from 25 to 44, 27.9% from 45 to 64, and 14.1% who were 65 years of age or older. The median age was 41 years. For every 100 females, there were 103.6 males. For every 100 females age 18 and over, there were 105.9 males.

The median income for a household in the town was $40,458, and the median income for a family was $45,385. Males had a median income of $31,484 versus $22,566 for females. The per capita income for the town was $19,172. About 3.2% of families and 7.3% of the population were below the poverty line, including 8.0% of those under age 18 and 5.3% of those age 65 or over.

== Lempster wind farm ==
Lempster is home to New Hampshire's first wind farm, providing a total of 24 MW from 12 turbines, which started operation in 2008. The turbines are located on Bean Mountain, a knob on the north–south ridge of Lempster Mountain (43°14′N 72°09′W).

== Notable people ==
- Martha Ann Honeywell (1786–1856), artist
- Martin L. Keyes (1850–?), founder of Keyes Fibre Company (1903)
- Hosea Washington Parker (1833–1922), lawyer, congressman
- Mary Elizabeth Perley (1863–?), 19th- and 20th-century educator, author
