= Mayoral elections in Manchester, New Hampshire, in the 20th century =

Beginning shortly after the city's incorporation as a city in 1846, elections have been held in the mayor of Manchester, New Hampshire. The following article provides information on the elections for mayor in the city during the 20th century.

== Election laws and history ==
The city of Manchester, New Hampshire, held its first mayoral election in 1846.

Throughout the 20th century, and still today, regularly scheduled elections are for two-year terms. This had been the case since the 1880 election.

The city's mayoral elections are currently are nonpartisan, a change which was adopted before the 1997 election. While, prior to 1997, elections had long been partisan, there had been stretches previous to 1999 in which the city's mayoral elections had been nonpartisan, including the stretch of four elections held from 1953 through 1959.

== 1902 ==
1902 Manchester, New Hampshire, mayoral election
Mayor before election
William C. Clarke
Republican
Elected mayor
Eugene Elliott Reed
Democratic

The 1902 Manchester, New Hampshire, mayoral election was held to elect the mayor of Manchester, New Hampshire. It saw the election of Democratic candidate Eugene Elliott Reed, who defeated Republican candidate Walter M. Fulton, Independent Citizens candidate Murdock A. Weathers and Socialist candidate John E. Mansfield.

== 1904 ==
1904 Manchester, New Hampshire, mayoral election
Mayor before election
Eugene Elliott Reed
Democratic
Elected mayor
Eugene Elliott Reed
Democratic

The 1904 Manchester, New Hampshire, mayoral election was held to elect the mayor of Manchester, New Hampshire. It saw the reelection of Eugene Elliott Reed, who defeated Charles J. Brygger and James E. Reed.

== 1906 ==
1906 Manchester, New Hampshire, mayoral election
Mayor before election
Eugene Elliott Reed
Democratic
Elected mayor
Eugene Elliott Reed
Democratic

The 1906 Manchester, New Hampshire, mayoral election was held to elect the mayor of Manchester, New Hampshire. It saw the reelection of Democratic incumbent Eugene Elliott Reed to a third consecutive term. Reed defeated Republican candidate Charles E. Cox and Socialist candidate Samuel F. Claflin.

== 1908 ==
1908 Manchester, New Hampshire, mayoral election
Mayor before election
Eugene Elliott Reed
Democratic
Elected mayor
Eugene Elliott Reed
Democratic

The 1908 Manchester, New Hampshire, mayoral election was held to elect the mayor of Manchester, New Hampshire. It saw the reelection of Democratic incumbent Eugene Elliott Reed to a fourth consecutive term. Reed defeated Republican candidate Lloyd T. Mead, Socialist candidate John C. Paine, and independent candidate George W. Rief.

== 1910 ==
1910 Manchester, New Hampshire, mayoral election
Candidate	Edward Clarke Smith	James Sullivan
Mayor before election
Eugene Elliott Reed
Democratic
Elected mayor
Edward Clarke Smith
Republican

The 1910 Manchester, New Hampshire, mayoral election was held to elect the mayor of Manchester, New Hampshire. It saw the election of Edward Clarke Smith, who defeated James Sullivan.

== 1912 ==
1912 Manchester, New Hampshire, mayoral election
Mayor before election
Edward Clarke Smith
Republican
Elected mayor
Charles C. Hayes
Democratic

The 1912 Manchester, New Hampshire, mayoral election was held to elect the mayor of Manchester, New Hampshire. It saw the election of Democratic candidate Charles C. Hayes, who defeated Republican candidate Victor W. Roy, Progressive candidate Lloyd T. Mead, Socialist candidate William J. Ryan.

== 1914 ==
1914 Manchester, New Hampshire, mayoral election
- December 8, 1914
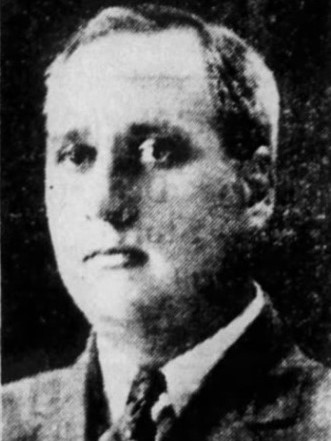

Candidate	Harry W. Spaulding	Charles C. Hayes
Party	Republican	Democratic
Mayor before election
Charles C. Hayes
Democratic
Elected mayor
Harry W. Spaulding
Republican

The 1914 Manchester, New Hampshire, mayoral election was held on December 8, 1914, to elect the mayor of Manchester, New Hampshire. It saw the election of Republican Harry W. Spaulding, who defeated Democratic incumbent Charles C. Hayes and Socialist candidate William J. Ryan. Sapulding won by a margin of 386 votes. The election was considered one of the most hotly contested elections in years.

In the coinciding Board of Aldermen election, the Republican Party won full control of the board, winning seven of the board's nine seats.

== 1915 ==
1915 Manchester, New Hampshire, mayoral election
- November 2, 1915
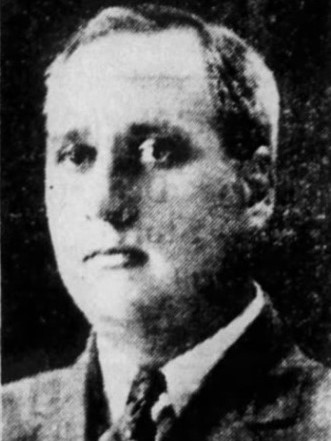

Candidate	Harry W. Spaulding	Charles C. Hayes
Party	Republican	Democratic
Popular vote	5,306	4,284
Mayor before election
Harry W. Spaulding
Republican
Elected mayor
Harry W. Spaulding
Republican

The 1915 Manchester, New Hampshire, mayoral election was held on November 2, 1915, to elect the mayor of Manchester, New Hampshire. It saw the reelection of Republican candidate Harry W. Spaulding, who defeated Democratic candidate Charles C. Hayes (himself a former mayor) and Socialist candidate James E. Dorren. Spaulding's margin of victory was significantly greater than his margin of victory in the previous 1914 mayoral election.

In the coinciding Board of Aldermen election, the Republican Party won ten of the thirteen seats on the board. Also, notably, the Republican incumbent was elected the city's overseer of the poor against a Democratic challenger in that office's coinciding election.

1915 Manchester, New Hampshire, mayoral election results
Party	Candidate	Votes	%
Republican	Harry W. Spaulding (incumbent)	5,306	
Democratic	Charles C. Hayes	4,284	
Socialist	James E. Dorren		
Total votes			100

== 1917 ==
1917 Manchester, New Hampshire, mayoral election
- November 6, 1917

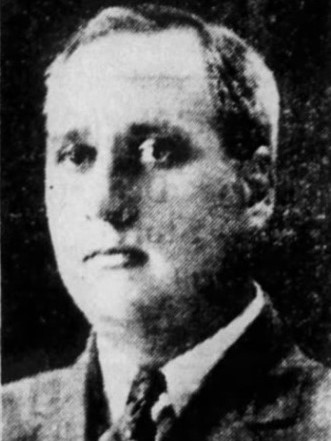
Candidate	Moise Verrette	Harry W. Spaulding
Party	Democratic	Republican
Popular vote	5,440	4,012
Percentage	57.55%	42.45%
Mayor before election
Harry W. Spaulding
Republican
Elected mayor
Moise Verrette
Democratic

The 1917 Manchester, New Hampshire, mayoral election was held on November 6, 1917, to elect the mayor of Manchester, New Hampshire. It saw the election of Democratic candidate Moise Verrette, who unseated Republican incumbent Harry W. Spaulding.

In the municipal elections held in the city on November 6, Democrats won overall control of the city's government for the first time in 42 years. Democrats nearly swept all of the city's elections, winning not just the mayoralty, but also control of all of the city's commissions and public service boards, as well as the offices of auditor, collector, city clerk, engineer, messenger, physician, sealer, solicitor, superintendent of buildings, treasurer, and weigher. Democrats also won numerous municipal clerkships.

1917 Manchester, New Hampshire, mayoral election results
Party	Candidate	Votes	%
Democratic	Moise Verrette	5,440	57.55
Republican	Harry W. Spaulding (incumbent)	4,012	42.45
Total votes		9,452	100

== 1919 ==
1919 Manchester, New Hampshire, mayoral election
Candidate	Moise Verrette	Andrew B. Bunton
Party	Democratic
Mayor before election
Moise Verrette
Democratic
Elected mayor
Moise Verrette
Democratic

The 1919 Manchester, New Hampshire, mayoral election was held to elect the mayor of Manchester, New Hampshire. It saw the reelection of Democratic incumbent Moise Verrette, who defeated Andrew B. Bunton.

=== Democratic primary ===
In the Democratic primary, held on October 23, 1921, incumbent mayor Moise Verrette won renomination over challenger Charles D. Ward by a large margin. More than 3,300 votes were cast in the primary.

=== General election ===
Democratic incumbent Moise Verrette defeated Andrew B. Bunton.

== 1921 ==
1921 Manchester, New Hampshire, mayoral election
- November 8, 1921
Candidate	George E. Trudel	John L. Barry
Party	Republican	Democratic
Mayor before election
Moise Verrette
Democratic
Elected mayor
George E. Trudel
Republican

The 1921 Manchester, New Hampshire, mayoral election was held on November 8, 1921, to elect the mayor of Manchester, New Hampshire. It saw the election of Republican nominee George E. Trudel, who defeated Democratic nominee John L. Barry by a roughly 4,000-vote margin.

This was the first mayoral election in Manchester since the ratification of the Nineteenth Amendment to the United States Constitution, which granted women suffrage across the entire United States. Consequently, it was first Manchester mayoral election in which women voted.

=== Democratic primary ===
The Democratic primary was held October 17, 1921.

=== Republican primary ===
George E. Trudel won the Republican primary, held on October 10, 1921. Trudel was a successful businessman and an incumbent member of the Executive Council of New Hampshire under Governor Albert O. Brown. Trudel had never before run for office. Among those he defeated in the primary was former mayor Edward Clarke Smith.

1921 Manchester, New Hampshire Republican mayoral primary election results
Party	Candidate	Votes	%
Republican	George E. Trudel	2,003	41.80
Republican	Edward Clarke Smith	1,389	28.99
Republican	Aime E. Boisvert	1,265	26.40
Republican	Frank H. Challis	135	2.82
Total votes		4,792	100

=== General election ===
Republican nominee George E. Trudel, defeated Democratic nominee John L. Barry by a roughly 4,000-vote margin.

== 1923 ==
1923 Manchester, New Hampshire, mayoral election
- November 1, 1923
Candidate	George E. Trudel	John L. Barry
Party	Republican	Democratic
Popular vote	10,836	9,618
Percentage	52.98	47.02
Mayor before election
George E. Trudel
Republican
Elected mayor
George E. Trudel
Republican

The 1923 Manchester, New Hampshire, mayoral election was held on November 1, 1923, to elect the mayor of Manchester, New Hampshire. It saw the reelection of Republican incumbent George E. Trudel, who defeated Democratic challenger John L. Barry. The campaign was described by the Groton Times as one of the city's "most stirring" election campaigns in years.

Democratic nominee John L. Barry was a former Manchester alderman, and had been Trudel's opponent in the previous 1921 election. While he again lost to Trudel, Barry did manage to cut Trudel's margin of victory by nearly half compared to the previous election.

In the coinciding Board of Aldermen election, Republicans retained their control of the board. The Republicans also nearly swept the races for citywide offices, with the exception of charity commissioner (which saw a Democratic incumbent reelected).

1923 Manchester, New Hampshire, mayoral election results
Party	Candidate	Votes	%
Republican	George E. Trudel (incumbent)	10,836	52.98
Democratic	John L. Barry	9,618	47.02
Total votes		20,454	100

== 1925 ==
1925 Manchester, New Hampshire, mayoral election
- November 3, 1925
Candidate	Arthur E. Moreau	Timothy F. O'Connor	Adolph Wagner
Party	Republican	Democratic	Independent
Popular vote	'
Mayor before election
George E. Trudel
Republican
Elected mayor
Arthur E. Moreau
Republican

The 1925 Manchester, New Hampshire, mayoral election was held on November 3, 1925, to elect the mayor of Manchester, New Hampshire. It saw the election of Republican nominee Andrew E. Moreau, who defeated Democratic nominee Timothy F. Conner and independent candidate Adolph Wagner.

In the coinciding Board of Aldermen election, Republicans retained their majority of the board, with Republicans winning eight seats and Democrats winning five.

=== Republican caucus ===
In the October 19 caucus for the Republican nomination, Andrew E. Moreau, a member of the New Hampshire Executive Council, won the party's nomination over city alderman Adolph Wagner.

1925 Manchester, New Hampshire Republican mayoral caucus results
Party	Candidate	Votes	%
Republican	Arthur E. Moreau	3,497	60.89
Republican	Adolph Wagner	2,246	39.11
Total votes		5,743	100

=== General election ===
Republican nominee Andrew E. Moreau defeated Democratic nominee Timothy F. Conner and independent candidate Adolph Wagner (the latter of whom had, before becoming an independent candidate, unsuccessfully run for the Republican nomination). Wagner won a strong plurality of the vote.

Democratic nominee Conner was an attorney.

The campaign was later described by the Groton Times as, "one of the most stirring" three-way races "in recent years".

When it was a two-candidate campaign between Moreau and Conner, the general election had originally been seen as a likely victory for Moreau. However, upon the entrance of alderman Adolph Wagner as an independent candidate, the race began to be considered a tossup between Moreau and Conner.

== 1927 ==
1927 Manchester, New Hampshire, mayoral election
- November 8, 1927
Candidate	Arthur E. Moreau	William G. McCarthy
Party	Republican	Democratic
Popular vote	13,775	6,194
Percentage	68.98%	31.02%
Mayor before election
Arthur E. Moreau
Republican
Elected mayor
Arthur E. Moreau
Republican

The 1927 Manchester, New Hampshire, mayoral election was held on November 8, 1927, to elect the mayor of Manchester, New Hampshire. It saw the reelection of Republican incumbent Andrew E. Moreau, who defeated state senator William G. McCarthy, the Democratic nominee.

In the coinciding municipal elections, the Republican nominee won a surprise victory in the race for commissioner of charities, and the Republican Party also increased its majority on the Board of Aldermen by a single seat (now holding nine of the board's ten seats) by unseating a ten-year incumbent.

1927 Manchester, New Hampshire, mayoral election
Party	Candidate	Votes	%
Republican	Arthur E. Moreau (incumbent)	13,775	68.98
Democratic	William G. McCarthy	6,194	31.02
Total votes		19,969	100

== 1929 ==
1929 Manchester, New Hampshire, mayoral election
- November 5, 1929
Candidate	Arthur E. Moreau	C.J. Belanger
Party	Republican	Democratic
Popular vote	12,421	8,695
Percentage	58.82%	41.18%
Mayor before election
Arthur E. Moreau
Republican
Elected mayor
Arthur E. Moreau
Republican

The 1929 Manchester, New Hampshire, mayoral election was held on November 5, 1929, to elect the mayor of Manchester, New Hampshire. It saw the reelection of Republican incumbent Andrew E. Moreau to a third consecutive term. Moreau defeated Democratic nominee C. J. Belanger.

In the city's coinciding Board of Aldermen election, the Republicans won nine of the board's thirteen seats, the same exact majority they had held before the election.

1929 Manchester, New Hampshire, mayoral election
Party	Candidate	Votes	%
Republican	Arthur E. Moreau (incumbent)	12,421	58.82
Democratic	William G. McCarthy	8,695	41.18
Total votes		21,116	100

== 1931 ==
1931 Manchester, New Hampshire, mayoral election
- November 3, 1931
Candidate	Damase Caron	Arthur E. Moreau
Party	Democratic	Republican
Mayor before election
Arthur E. Moreau
Republican
Elected mayor
Damase Caron
Democratic

The 1931 Manchester, New Hampshire, mayoral election was held on November 3, 1931, to elect the mayor of Manchester, New Hampshire. It saw the election of Democratic nominee Damase Caron, who unseated Republican incumbent Arthur E. Moreau by a roughly 1,500-vote margin of victory. Caron's victory was viewed as a landslide victory.

Caron was a local physician.

Coinciding elections in the city, as well as much of the region, saw significant wins for Democrats, proving to be a regional wave election. This included Democrats gaining the majority of the city's Board of Aldermen. Also, a coinciding referendum saw the voters approve limited hours of sports and amusements to take place on Sundays, partially rolling-back the city's blue laws.

== 1933 ==
1933 Manchester, New Hampshire, mayoral election
- November 7, 1933
Candidate	Damase Caron	John Jacobson Jr.
Party	Democratic	Republican
Mayor before election
Damase Caron
Democratic
Elected mayor
Damase Caron
Democratic

The 1933 Manchester, New Hampshire, mayoral election was held on November 7, 1933, to elect the mayor of Manchester, New Hampshire. It saw the reelection of Democratic incumbent Damase Caron, who defeated Republican nominee John Jacobson Jr. by a margin of 2,924 votes.

On the eve of the election, the Portsmouth Herald described the campaign as having been "lively", and wrote that the result was expected to be very close.

In the coinciding municipal elections, the Democratic Party won a majority of eleven of the thirteen seats on the city's Board of Aldermen (with Republicans winning the remaining two), and the Democratic incumbent commissioner of charities won reelection over their Republican opponent by a landslide 7,055 vote margin.

== 1935 ==
1935 Manchester, New Hampshire, mayoral election
- November 5, 1935
Candidate	Damase Caron	Joseph H. Geisel
Party	Democratic	Republican
Mayor before election
Damase Caron
Democratic
Elected mayor
Damase Caron
Democratic

The 1935 Manchester, New Hampshire, mayoral election was held on November 5, 1935, to elect the mayor of Manchester, New Hampshire. It saw the reelection of Democratic incumbent Damase Caron to a third consecutive term. Caron defeated former postmaster Joseph H. Geisel, the Republican nominee, by a margin of roughly 3,300 votes. This was considered a landslide victory. At the time, this margin of victory was the greatest any Democrat had ever won in a Manchester mayoral election.

In the coinciding municipal elections, the Democratic Party won a majority of ten of the thirteen seats on the city's Board of Aldermen.

== 1937 ==
1937 Manchester, New Hampshire, mayoral election
- November 3, 1937
Candidate	Damase Caron	Gerard A. Hamel
Party	Democratic	Republican
Popular vote	15,622	10,765
Percentage	59.20%	40.80%
Mayor before election
Damase Caron
Democratic
Elected mayor
Damase Caron
Democratic

The 1937 Manchester, New Hampshire, mayoral election was held on November 3, 1937, to elect the mayor of Manchester, New Hampshire. It saw the reelection of Democratic incumbent Damase Caron to a fourth consecutive term. Caron defeated Republican nominee Gerard A. Hamel. He won by a vote margin even greater than his previous win, thus, setting a new record for the greatest margin of victory any Democrat had won in terms of vote numbers for a Manchester mayoral election.

In the previous two years, Caron had helped lead the city through turbulent times, being credited with helping to diversify its economy with smaller industrial operations in the aftermath of the bankruptcy of the Amoskeag Manufacturing Company, a major employer in the city.

1937 Manchester, New Hampshire, mayoral election
Party	Candidate	Votes	%
Democratic	Damase Caron (incumbent)	15,622	59.20
Republican	Gerard A. Hamel	10,765	40.80
Total votes		26,387	100

== 1939 ==
1939 Manchester, New Hampshire, mayoral election
- November 7, 1939
Candidate	Damase Caron	Wilfred A. LaFlamme
Party	Democratic	Republican
Mayor before election
Damase Caron
Democratic
Elected mayor
Damase Caron
Democratic

The 1939 Manchester, New Hampshire, mayoral election was held on November 7, 1939, to elect the mayor of Manchester, New Hampshire. It saw the reelection of Democratic incumbent Damase Caron to a fifth consecutive term. Caron defeated Caron defeated Republican nominee Wilfred A. LaFlamme. Caron was the first mayor of the city to win a fifth consecutive term. Caron won by a 903-vote margin of victory, which was significantly smaller than the margins he had won his previous four elections by.

In the initial vote count, Caron won by a 1,009 vote margin of victory. However, on November 22, the city's Board of Aldermen approved a petition by the Republican City Committee to recount the vote in the city's ninth ward, where a discrepancy had the mayoral vote totals exceed the number of ballots cast by 74. The results of this recount were announced on November 29, and saw Caron's margin of victory decreased to 903 votes.

== 1941 ==
1941 Manchester, New Hampshire, mayoral election
- November 4, 1941
Candidate	Wilfred A. LaFlamme	Damase Caron
Party	Republican	Democratic
Mayor before election
Damase Caron
Democratic
Elected mayor
Wildred A. LaFlamme
Republican

The 1941 Manchester, New Hampshire, mayoral election was held on November 4, 1941, to elect the mayor of Manchester, New Hampshire. It saw Republican nominee Wilfred A. LaFlamme unseat five-term Democratic incumbent Damase Caron. The race was a rematch of the previous election.

In the initial count, LaFlamme had a lead of 638 votes. After a recount of the city's municipal elections was held, LaFlamme's final margin of victory over Caron was 618 votes.

== 1943 ==
1943 Manchester, New Hampshire, mayoral election
- November 2, 1943
Candidate	Josephat T. Benoit	Wilfred A. LaFlamme
Party	Democratic	Republican
Mayor before election
Wildred A. LaFlamme
Republican
Elected mayor
Josephat T. Benoit
Democratic

The 1943 Manchester, New Hampshire, mayoral election was held on November 2, 1943, to elect the mayor of Manchester, New Hampshire. It saw Democratic nominee Josephat T. Benoit unseat first-term Republican incumbent Wilfred A. Laflamme. Benoit won election by a 1,229 vote margin of victory. Benoit's win was considered an upset victory.

Before resigning to run for mayor, Benoit had been the editor of the local French language newspaper L'Avenir National.

== 1945 ==
1945 Manchester, New Hampshire, mayoral election
- November 6, 1945
Candidate	Josephat T. Benoit	Leo F. Donnelly
Party	Democratic	Republican
Mayor before election
Josephat T. Benoit
Democratic
Elected mayor
Josephat T. Benoit
Democratic

The 1945 Manchester, New Hampshire, mayoral election was held on November 6, 1945, to elect the mayor of Manchester, New Hampshire. It saw the reelection of Democratic incumbent Josephat T. Benoit, who defeated Republican nominee Leo F. Donnelly. Benoit won by a large margin.

After the coinciding Board of Aldermen election, control of the board belonged to the Democrats. The election also coincided with a school board election.

== 1947 ==
1947 Manchester, New Hampshire, mayoral election
- November 4, 1947
Candidate	Josephat T. Benoit	Albert W. Hamel
Party	Democratic	Republican
Mayor before election
Josephat T. Benoit
Democratic
Elected mayor
Josephat T. Benoit
Democratic

The 1947 Manchester, New Hampshire, mayoral election was held on November 4, 1947, to elect the mayor of Manchester, New Hampshire. It saw the reelection of Democratic incumbent Josephat T. Benoit to a third consecutive term. Benoit defeated Republican nominee Albert W. Hamel.

== 1949 ==
1949 Manchester, New Hampshire, mayoral election
- November 8, 1949
Candidate	Josephat T. Benoit	Edward F. Fitzgerald
Party	Democratic	Republican
Mayor before election
Josephat T. Benoit
Democratic
Elected mayor
Josephat T. Benoit
Democratic

The 1949 Manchester, New Hampshire, mayoral election was held on November 8, 1949, to elect the mayor of Manchester, New Hampshire. It saw the reelection of Democratic incumbent Josephat T. Benoit to a fourth consecutive term. Benoit defeated Republican nominee Edward F. Fitzgerald.

Election forecasters had correctly anticipated a Benoit victory.

Republican nominee Fitzgerald had previously run unsuccessfully for New Hampshire Governor's Council in 1938.

== 1951 ==
1951 Manchester, New Hampshire, mayoral election
- November 6, 1951
Candidate	Josephat T. Benoit	James L. Mahony
Party	Democratic	Republican
Mayor before election
Josephat T. Benoit
Democratic
Elected mayor
Josephat T. Benoit
Democratic

The 1951 Manchester, New Hampshire, mayoral election was held on November 6, 1951, to elect the mayor of Manchester, New Hampshire. It saw the reelection of Democratic incumbent Josephat T. Benoit to a fifth consecutive term. Benoit defeated Republican nominee James L. Mahony.

Election forecasters had anticipated an easy Benoit victory. However, he wound up only winning by a 664 margin.

The election coincided with school board, selectmen, and Board of Aldermen elections in the city.

== 1953 ==
1953 Manchester, New Hampshire, mayoral election
- November 3, 1953

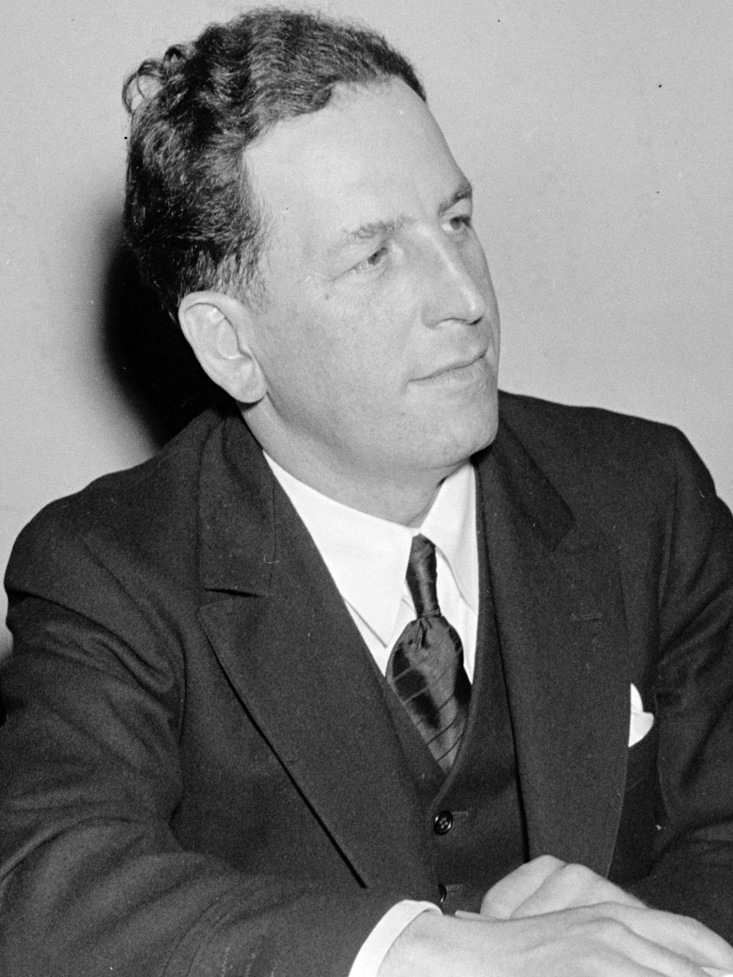
Candidate	Josephat T. Benoit	Alphonse Roy
Party	Nonpartisan	Nonpartisan
Mayor before election
Josephat T. Benoit
Democratic
Elected mayor
Josephat T. Benoit
Democratic

The 1953 Manchester, New Hampshire, mayoral election was held on November 3, 1953, to elect the mayor of Manchester, New Hampshire. It saw the reelection of incumbent mayor Josephat T. Benoit to a sixth consecutive term. Benoit defeated former United States congressman Alphonse Roy. Benoit was the first, and is so far the only, mayor in the city's history to win election to a sixth term.

The election was the first election to be held under new rules which saw municipal elections become nonpartisan.

== 1955 ==
1955 Manchester, New Hampshire, mayoral election
- November 8, 1955
Nominee	Josephat T. Benoit	James B. Sullivan
Party	Nonpartisan	Nonpartisan
Popular vote	15,423	13,336
Percentage	51.42%	44.46%
Mayor before election
Josephat T. Benoit
Democratic
Elected mayor
Josephat T. Benoit
Democratic

The 1955 Manchester, New Hampshire, mayoral election was held on November 7, 1955, to elect the mayor of Manchester, New Hampshire. It saw the reelection of incumbent mayor Josephat T. Benoit to a seventh consecutive term. Benoit defeated James B. Sullivan and Clemens Martell.

The election was formally nonpartisan.

1955 Manchester, New Hampshire, mayoral election
Candidate	Votes	%
Josephat T. Benoit (incumbent)	15,423	51.42
James B. Sullivan	13,336	44.46
Clemens Martell	1,238	4.13
Total votes	29,997	100

== 1957 ==
1957 Manchester, New Hampshire, mayoral election
- November 5, 1957
Candidate	Josephat T. Benoit	Peter Poirier
Party	Nonpartisan	Nonpartisan
Mayor before election
Josephat T. Benoit
Democratic
Elected mayor
Josephat T. Benoit
Democratic

The 1957 Manchester, New Hampshire, mayoral election was held on November 5, 1957, to elect the mayor of Manchester, New Hampshire. It saw the reelection of incumbent mayor Josephat T. Benoit to an eighth consecutive term. Benoit defeated Peter Poirier.

The election was officially nonpartisan.

== 1959 ==
1959 Manchester, New Hampshire, mayoral election
- November 3, 1959
Candidate	Josephat T. Benoit	John C. Mongan
Party	Nonpartisan	Nonpartisan
Popular vote	15,337	14,707
Percentage	51.05%	48.95%
Mayor before election
Josephat T. Benoit
Democratic
Elected mayor
Josephat T. Benoit
Democratic

The 1959 Manchester, New Hampshire, mayoral election was held on November 3, 1959, to elect the mayor of Manchester, New Hampshire. It saw the reelection of incumbent mayor Josephat T. Benoit to a ninth consecutive term. Benoit's challenger, John C. Mongan, a telephone company executive, ran a serious campaign against to him.

The election was officially nonpartisan.

1959 Manchester, New Hampshire, mayoral election
Candidate	Votes	%
Josephat T. Benoit (incumbent)	15,337	51.05
John C. Mongan	14,707	48.95
Total votes	30,044	100

== 1961 ==
1961 Manchester, New Hampshire, mayoral election
- November 7, 1961
Candidate	John C. Mongan	Roger Brassard
Party	Republican	Democratic
Popular vote	17,672	14,396
Percentage	55.11%	44.89%
Mayor before election
Josephat T. Benoit
Democratic
Elected mayor
John C. Mongan
Republican

The 1961 Manchester, New Hampshire, mayoral election was held on November 7, 1961, to elect the mayor of Manchester, New Hampshire. It saw the election of Republican nominee John C. Mongan, who defeated Democratic nominee Roger E. Brassard.

The election was the first to be run by new rules which saw the shift back to partisan municipal elections, after the past four mayoral elections had been nonpartisan.

Mongan had earlier run in the previous 1959 mayoral election.

Mongan's victory was a surprise upset victory. At the time, the city was overwhelmingly Democratic-leaning (with Democrats being believed to outnumber Republicans by a 2–1 margin).

1961 Manchester, New Hampshire, mayoral election
Party	Candidate	Votes	%
Republican	John C. Mongan	17,672	55.11
Democratic	Roger Brassard	14,396	44.89
Total votes		32,068	100

== 1963 ==
1963 Manchester, New Hampshire, mayoral election
- November 5, 1963
Candidate	Roland S. Vallee	John C. Mongan
Party	Democratic	Republican
Mayor before election
John C. Mongan
Republican
Elected mayor
Roland S. Vallee
Democratic

The 1963 Manchester, New Hampshire, mayoral election was held on November 5, 1963, to elect the mayor of Manchester, New Hampshire. It saw the election of Democratic nominee Roland S. Vallee, who defeated incumbent Republican mayor John C. Mongan. Vallee won by a roughly 2,200 vote margin.

== 1965 ==
1965 Manchester, New Hampshire, mayoral election
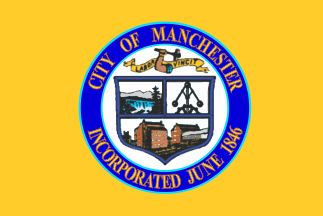
- November 3, 1965
Candidate	Roland S. Vallee	Paul M. Martel
Party	Democratic	Republican
Mayor before election
Roland S. Vallee
Democratic
Elected mayor
Roland S. Vallee
Democratic

The 1965 Manchester, New Hampshire, mayoral election was held on November 3, 1965, to elect the mayor of Manchester, New Hampshire. It saw the reelection of Democratic incumbent Roland S. Vallee, who defeated Republican nominee Paul M. Martel. Vallee won by a 4,838 margin of victory.

== 1967 ==
1967 Manchester, New Hampshire, mayoral election
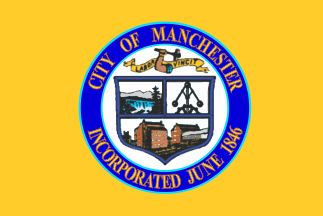
- November 8, 1967
Candidate	John C. Mongan	Roland S. Vallee
Party	Republican	Democratic
Mayor before election
Roland S. Vallee
Democratic
Elected mayor
John C. Mongan
Republican

The 1967 Manchester, New Hampshire, mayoral election was held on November 8, 1967, to elect the mayor of Manchester, New Hampshire. It saw the election of Republican John C. Mongan to a second nonconsecutive term, unseating incumbent two-term Democratic mayor Roland S. Vallee. Mongan's victory was regarded to be an upset.

In the initial count, Mongan won by a merely 37 vote margin, and Vallee requested a recount. After the recount, Mongan's margin of victory increased to 51 votes. Vallee conceded. After the recount, mayor-elect Mongan did admit that he believed that there had been balloting irregularities, but also said that he did not want to "burden the taxpayers with the cost of another recount".

Vallee's loss was attributed to allegations that he had manipulated lower tax assessments on his own buildings.

Mongan and Vallee had previously faced each other four years earlier in the 1963 mayoral race.

== 1969 ==
1969 Manchester, New Hampshire, mayoral election
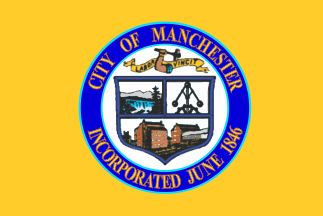
- November 4, 1969
Candidate	Henry J. Pariseau	Roland S. Vallee
Party	Republican	Democratic
Popular vote	19,875	11,202
Percentage	63.95%	36.05%
Mayor before election
John C. Mongan
Republican
Elected mayor
Henry J. Pariseau
Republican

The 1969 Manchester, New Hampshire, mayoral election was held on November 4, 1969, to elect the mayor of Manchester, New Hampshire. It saw the election of Republican Henry J. Pariseau, defeating Democratic nominee Roland S. Vallee (a former mayor of the city). Incumbent Republican mayor John C. Mongan had lost renomination to Pariseau in the Republican primary.

=== Democratic primary ===
Former mayor Roland Vallee was the winner of a three-way race in a Democratic primary election in which 11,000 votes were cast.

=== Republican primary ===
Incumbent mayor John C. Mongan, who was serving his second nonconsecutive term, lost his attempt at renomination in the October 7 Republican primary election to Henry J. Pariseau. Pariseau, a first-time candidate for elected office, was both a businessman and the city's fire commissioner, and had actually been Mongan's campaign manager in the city's 1961 mayoral election.

The primary featured a total of three candidates. Pariseau defeated Mongan by an 883 margin.

=== General election ===
The general election saw Pariseau defeat Vallee. Pariseau led the vote in each of the city's 14 wards.

Despite the state's Tax Commission having, earlier in the year, cleared Vallee of charges that he has manipulated lower tax assessments on his own properties, Pariseau used the allegations in his portrayal of Vallee as someone voters could not trust.

While their mayoral nominee handily lost, the Democratic Party performed well in the coinciding election for Board of Aldermen, increasing their majority by a single seat to hold 12 of the board's 14 seats.

1969 Manchester, New Hampshire, mayoral election
Party	Candidate	Votes	%
Republican	Henry J. Pariseau	19,875	63.95
Democratic	Roland S. Vallee	11,202	36.05
Total votes		31,077	100

== 1971 ==
1971 Manchester, New Hampshire, mayoral election
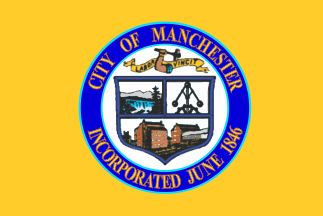
- November 2, 1971
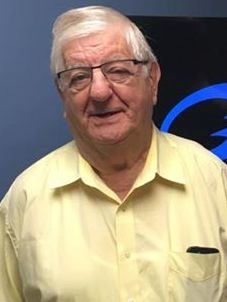

Candidate	Sylvio Dupuis	Frank Wageman
Party	Democratic	Republican
Popular vote	16,260	15,859
Percentage	50.62%	49.38%
Mayor before election
Charles R. Stanton
Democratic
Elected mayor
Sylvio Dupuis
Democratic

The 1971 Manchester, New Hampshire, mayoral election was held on November 2, 1971, to elect the mayor of Manchester, New Hampshire. It saw the election of Democratic nominee Sylvio Dupuis, who defeated Republican alderman Frank Wageman.

Incumbent mayor Charles R. Stanton, who had been appointed by the city's Board of Aldermen after the death in office of Harry Pariseau, did not seek to a full term.

=== Primaries ===
During the October 5 primary elections, three election officials were arrested with charges of "official misconduct". Due to the misconduct, the results of the city's fourth ward were declared void, and the Board of Aldermen and mayor called for a special election in the ward to allow a re-vote. However, both the winners of the initial result of both party's primaries had already won by large enough margins in the other wards that the results of the fourth ward would not change the outcome of the mayoral primary.

In the Democratic primary, optometrist Sylvio Dupuis defeated New Hampshire state senators George Morrissette and William McCarthy, as Alphonse Bledeau, Lloyd Basinow, and Angela Lafond. Dupuis had a 5,353 margin of victory over runner-up Morrissette.

In the Republican primary, longtime alderman and insurance executive Frank Wageman defeated former city Republican Party chairman Gerald Carmen. Wageman won by a 2,047 margin of victory over Carmen.

=== General election ===
While the city was overwhelmingly Democratic (with registered Democrats outnumbering registered Republicans by 2–1), the election was predicted to be close, with Dupuis only having a slight advantage.

1971 Manchester, New Hampshire, mayoral election
Party	Candidate	Votes	%
Democratic	Sylvio Dupius	16,260	50.62
Republican	Frank Wageman	15,859	49.38
Total votes		32,119	100

== 1973 ==
1973 Manchester, New Hampshire, mayoral election
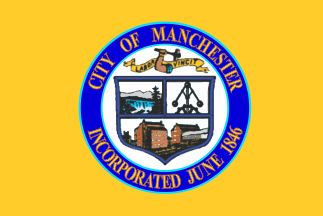
- November 6, 1973
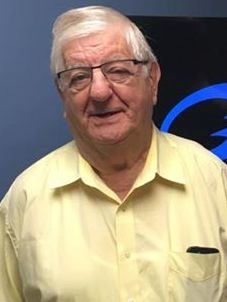

Candidate	Sylvio Dupuis	Frank Wageman
Party	Democratic	Republican
Popular vote	19,874	2,657
Percentage	88.21%	11.79%
Mayor before election
Sylvio Dupuis
Democratic
Elected mayor
Sylvio Dupuis
Democratic

The 1973 Manchester, New Hampshire, mayoral election was held on November 6, 1973, to elect the mayor of Manchester, New Hampshire. It saw the reelection of incumbent Democrat Sylvio Dupuis, who defeated Republican nominee Norman Gauthier in a landslide victory.

=== Primaries ===
Primary elections for the Democratic and Republican parties were held on October 2. Incumbent mayor Sylvio Dupuis ran unopposed in the Democratic primary, while Norman Gauthier defeated Lloyd Basinow in the Republican primary.

=== General election ===
1973 Manchester, New Hampshire, mayoral election
Party	Candidate	Votes	%
Democratic	Sylvio Dupius (incumbent)	19,874	88.21
Republican	Norman Gauthier	2,657	11.79
Total votes		22,531	100

== 1975 ==
1975 Manchester, New Hampshire, mayoral election
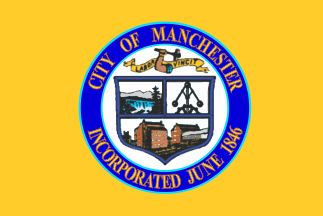
- November 4, 1975
Candidate	Charles R. Stanton	George Lacourse	Lloyd Basinow
Party	Democratic	Republican	Independent
Popular vote	15,044	2,465	2,232
Percentage	76.21%	12.49%	11.31%
Mayor before election
Charles R. Stanton
Democratic
Elected mayor
Charles R. Stanton
Democratic

The 1975 Manchester, New Hampshire, mayoral election was held on November 4, 1975, to elect the mayor of Manchester, New Hampshire. It saw the election of Democratic incumbent Charles R. Stanton, who had been appointed mayor after the resignation of Sylvio Dupuis. Stanton defeated Republican nominee George Lacourse and independent candidate Lloyd Basinow in a landslide victory.

1975 Manchester, New Hampshire, mayoral election
Party	Candidate	Votes	%
Democratic	Charles C. Stanton (incumbent)	15,044	76.21
Republican	George Lacourse	2,465	12.49
Independent	Lloyd Basinow	2,232	11.31
Total votes		19,741	100

== 1977 ==
1977 Manchester, New Hampshire, mayoral election
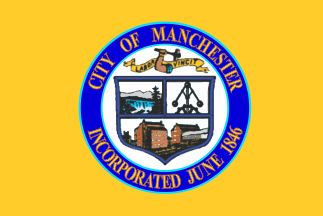
- November 8, 1977
Candidate	Charles R. Stanton	Richard Jacobs
Party	Democratic	Republican
Mayor before election
Charles R. Stanton
Democratic
Elected mayor
Charles R. Stanton
Democratic

The 1977 Manchester, New Hampshire, mayoral election was held on November 8, 1977, to elect the mayor of Manchester, New Hampshire. It saw the reelection of Democratic incumbent Charles R. Stanton, who defeated Republican nominee Richard Jacobs. Stanton won by a 3–1 margin of victory.

Jacobs alleged that Stanton and his mayoral administration were guilty of wrongdoing. This argument was undercut days prior to the election when New Hampshire attorney general David Souter disclosed that an investigation had failed to find any criminal activity.

== 1979 ==
1979 Manchester, New Hampshire, mayoral election
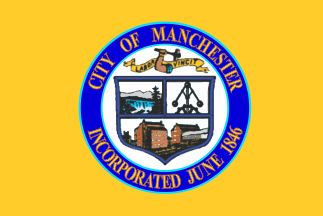
- November 6, 1979
Candidate	Charles R. Stanton	Henry Naro
Party	Democratic	Republican
Mayor before election
Charles R. Stanton
Democratic
Elected mayor
Charles R. Stanton
Democratic

The 1979 Manchester, New Hampshire, mayoral election was held on November 6, 1979, to elect the mayor of Manchester, New Hampshire. It saw the reelection of Democratic incumbent Charles R. Stanton to a third consecutive full term (he had also previously served two partial terms). Stanton defeated New Hampshire state representative Henry Naro Republican nominee.

The city was considered a Democratic stronghold.

Among those who had unsuccessfully sought the Democratic nomination was Robert F. Shaw.

== 1981 ==
1981 Manchester, New Hampshire, mayoral election
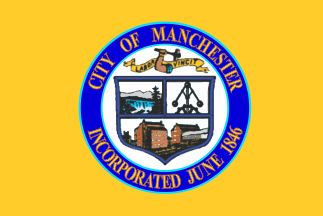
- November 3, 1981
- Turnout: 59.88%
Candidate	Emile Beaulieu	Richard Jacobs
Party	Democratic	Republican
Popular vote	13,429	9,662
Percentage	56.35%	40.54%
Mayor before election
Charles R. Stanton
Democratic
Elected mayor
Emile Beaulieu
Democratic

The 1981 Manchester, New Hampshire, mayoral election was held on November 3, 1981, to elect the mayor of Manchester, New Hampshire. The election was won by city welfare commissioner Emile Beaulieu, the Democratic nominee. Beaulieu defeated publishing executive Richard Jacobs, the Republican nominee. Turnout in the election was significantly higher than recent preceding elections.

While Democrats outnumbered Republicans in the city by a 2–1 margin, in the previous year's presidential election, the Republican ticket of Ronald Reagan and George H. W. Bush had managed to outperform the Democratic ticket of Jimmy Carter and Walter Mondale by a 2–1 margin in the city.

In addition to retaining the mayoralty, Democrats also increased their majority on the city's Board of Aldermen by a seat, now holding 9 out of the 12 seats on the board.

1981 Manchester, New Hampshire, mayoral election
Party	Candidate	Votes	%
Democratic	Emile Beaulieu	13,429	56.35
Republican	Richard Jacobs	9,662	40.54
Total votes		23,831	59.88

== 1983 ==
1983 Manchester, New Hampshire, mayoral election
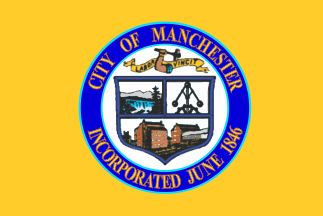
- November 8, 1983
Candidate	Robert F. Shaw	Emile Beaulieu
Party	Republican	Democratic
Popular vote	53%	47%
Mayor before election
Emile Beaulieu
Democratic
Elected mayor
Robert F. Shaw
Republican

The 1983 Manchester, New Hampshire, mayoral election was held on November 8, 1983, to elect the mayor of Manchester, New Hampshire. It saw the election of Republican nominee Robert F. Shaw, who unseated first-term Democratic incumbent Emile Beaulieu by a roughly 1,400 vote margin (53% to 47%). Shaw's win was considered to be a surprise upset victory. Shaw was the first Republican to be elected mayor in the city in twelve years.

Shaw managed to perform strongly in wards of the city the traditionally voted Democratic. He centered his campaign on attacking Beaulieu's spending record. Shaw was a gas station owner with no prior experience in public office. He had previously run unsuccessfully for the Democratic mayoral nomination in 1979.

Before the election, Beaulieu had been perceived as a popular incumbent. Many of the candidates running in the 1984 Democratic Party presidential primaries had been courting his endorsement, with several of their campaigns even having their staff support Bealieu's reelection effort by holding signs outside polling places on election day. Presidential contender Gary Hart even went as far as to attend Beaulieu's election night party.

== 1985 ==
1985 Manchester, New Hampshire, mayoral election
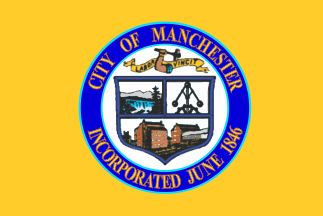
- November 5, 1985
Candidate	Robert F. Shaw	Peter Poirier
Party	Republican	Democratic
Popular vote	11,847	8,028
Percentage	59.61%	40.39%
Mayor before election
Robert F. Shaw
Republican
Elected mayor
Robert F. Shaw
Republican

The 1985 Manchester, New Hampshire, mayoral election was held on November 5, 1985, to elect the mayor of Manchester, New Hampshire. It saw the reelection of Republican incumbent Robert F. Shaw, who defeated Democratic nominee Peter Poirier. The election was considered to have had good voter turnout.

While, in its lead up, the election had failed to garner much attention from local voters, the election was treated by the state's Democratic Party as a paramount contest. In 1984, New Hampshire had seen the Democratic Party have what was considered its worst statewide election performance since at least the year 1900, with Republicans sweeping all of the top offices (winning the governorship, both United States House of Representatives seats, a United States Senate seat, and all five seats on the Executive Council), and with Republicans also winning the largest majority their party had won in the New Hampshire House of Representatives since 1900. At the time, some political analysts even predicted the state might be trending away from being a swing state, and instead towards being a state dominated by the Republican party. With the Democratic Party hoping to stage a comeback in the state, they wanted a win in the state's largest city, which could at least act as a morale boost to the state's Democratic faithful. The Democrats promoted the race as the prospective launching pad for their comeback in the state. Quite unusually for a local election, the state party fundraised for it. Poirier himself portrayed his performance in the election as "vitally important" to the state's Democratic Party. In late October, Michael Kranish of the Boston Globe wrote, "While a Democratic victory in this blue-collar city would hardly sway the political winds in the rest of the state, it would at least be a psychological boost for the party faithful. There are even those who fear a Democratic Party defeat might damage the party beyond repair."

State Democratic leadership was not alone in putting value on the election, with state Republican leaders also putting value on it, including having governor John Sununu hold a fundraiser for Shaw's reelection campaign. John Burns, the executive director of the Republican Party of New Hampshire, publicly admitted that he believed, "it would be a setback of sorts if we lost the race."

At the time of the election, the city's electorate was strongly Democratic by registration, with roughly 24,000 registered Democrats, 13,000 registered Republicans, and 13,000 independents. The city had, before to Shaw's 1983 victory, been considered reliable territory for Democrats to win the mayoralty.

In addition to being the incumbent mayor, Shaw was the owner of a gas station. Poirier was a teacher and basketball coach of twenty years who had never before held public office. He had previously run unsuccessfully for the New Hampshire Executive Council (which his own father had once been a member of). In his unsuccessful bid for the state's Executive Council, he had managed to carry the vote of the city of Manchester.

During the general election, both candidates stated they were anticipating a close race.

During the general election, both candidates made criticisms and negative accusations of their opponent in media advertisements. Poirier portrayed Shaw as being an ill-tempered autocrat that intended on increasing property taxes without making improvements to city services. In the final week of the campaign, Shaw ran a full-page newspaper advertisement which accused Shaw of using his office to secure a $100,000 profit in a real estate deal. Shaw accused Poirier of practicing "slime" politics with this attack, and said he would sue him for it.

In an inverse of the traditional positions seen in New Hampshire elections at the time, in this election the Republican was in support of a hike in property taxes while the Democrat pledged against making any tax increase. While Shaw had made a 1983 pledge not to raise taxes, he supported a tax increase in 1985, saying, "I could not in good conscience produce a political budget just to win this election."

1985 Manchester, New Hampshire, mayoral election
Party	Candidate	Votes	%
Democratic	Robert F. Shaw (incumbent)	11,847	59.61
Republican	Richard Jacobs	8,028	40.39
Total votes		19,875	100

== 1987 ==
1987 Manchester, New Hampshire, mayoral election
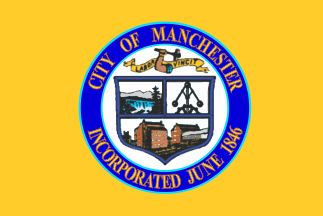
- November 3, 1987

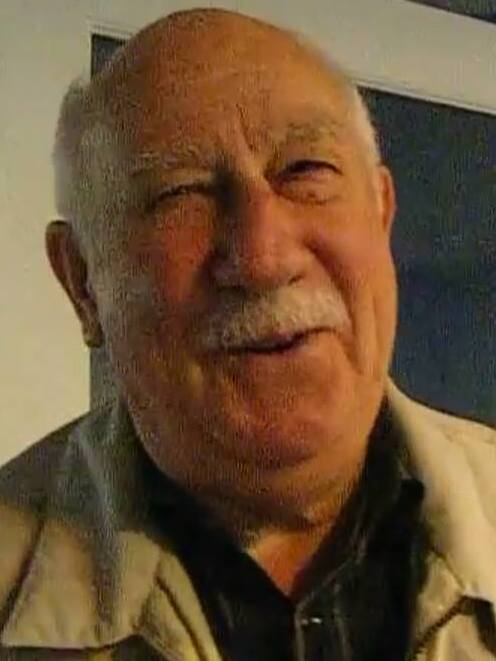
Candidate	Emile Beaulieu	Raymond Wieczorek
Party	Democratic	Republican
Popular vote	10,194	9,835
Percentage	50.90%	49.10%
Mayor before election
Robert F. Shaw
Republican
Elected mayor
Emile Beaulieu
Democratic

The 1987 Manchester, New Hampshire, mayoral election was held on November 2, 1971, to elect the mayor of Manchester, New Hampshire. It saw voters return former mayor Emile Beaulieu, a Democrat, to office for a second nonconsecutive term. Beaulieu narrowly defeated Republican nominee Raymond Wieczorek by a margin of 359 votes.

Two-term incumbent Republican mayor Robert F. Shaw declined to seek reelection to instead focus on his candidacy for the Republican nomination in the 1988 New Hampshire gubernatorial election.

=== Primary elections ===
Primary elections were held on September 15.

==== Democratic primary ====
In the Democratic primary, former mayor Emile Beaulieu defeated alderman Fernand Gelinas.

Bealieu had successfully damaged Gelinas candidacy after alleging that a supporter of Gelinas of campaign irregularities, filing a complaint with the attorney general's office. While the attorney general's office would find no wrongdoing, this conclusion came long after the primary election had already taken place.

1987 Manchester, New Hampshire, mayoral Democratic primary
Party	Candidate	Votes	%
Democratic	Emile Beaulieu	4,241	53.54
Democratic	Fernand Gelinas	3,680	46.46
Total votes		7,921	100

==== Republican primary ====
Raymond Wieczorek, a former insurance salesman and United Way chairman, ran unopposed in the Republican primary.

=== General election ===
The election campaign was considered to be relatively uneventful and low-key.

Beaulieu ran on his record in government, and proclaimed, "I support an open, honest government, with an open-door policy". Beaulieu's top issues were providing adequate police and fire protection, and enabling the city's departments and boards to operate with minimal interference from his mayoral administration. In the time since his previous term as mayor had ended, Beaulieu had served as president and board member of the Easter Seal Society and Goodwill Industries. He had also been the incorporator of the New Hampshire Workshop for the Blind and a member of the New Hampshire Right to Life Committee (an anti-abortion group). Bealieu also worked in the business of carpet sales. Beaulieu's past political experience in state and local government were seen as giving him an advantage in the election.

Wieczorek, an insurance businessman, ran on the idea that the city should be run like a business. He argued that Manchester would have better fiscal management if the city government's individual departments were given annual goals to achieve, and if they worked together towards a shared goal. Contrary to the hands-off approach Beaulieu was proposing to take with the city's departments and boards if elected, Wieczorek stated that he planned to have an active role in the operations of them. Wieczorek stated that, as mayor, he would work to develop a nonadversarial working relationship with the city's Board of Aldermen. He proposed, for the year 1989, having a tax cap of 3% and total budget expenditures of 5%. Wieczorek also placed an emphasis on addressing the population growth the city was undergoing, primarily the increases in services that would be demanded by this growth. Wieczorek had served as both president of the Manchester Housing Authority and president of United Way of Great Manchester, in addition to being involved in the Greater Manchester Human Services Council and Manchester Exchange Club.

The election was considered surprisingly narrow for a city in which registered Democrats significantly outnumbered registered Republicans. The city had more than 23,000 registered Democrats, 13,500 registered Republicans, and 9,401 registered independents. Manchester was considered to be the sole Democratic stronghold in what was, at the time, considered to be a solidly Republican state.

The election coincided with other municipal elections, including those for welfare commissioner, Board of Aldermen, and school board. In the coinciding election, Democrats secured a 9 to 12 majority over Democrats on the Board of Aldermen.

1987 Manchester, New Hampshire, mayoral election
Party	Candidate	Votes	%
Democratic	Emile Beaulieu	10,194	50.90
Republican	Raymond Wieczorek	9,835	49.10
Total votes		20,029	100

== 1989 ==
1989 Manchester, New Hampshire, mayoral election
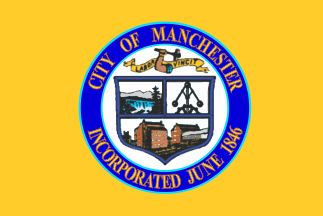
- November 7, 1989
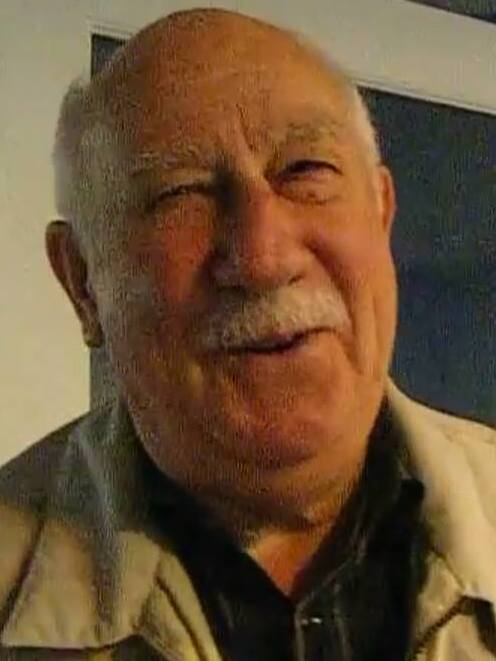

Candidate	Raymond Wieczorek	Emile Beaulieu	Fernand Gelinas
Party	Republican	Democratic	Independent
Mayor before election
Emile Beaulieu
Democratic
Elected mayor
Raymond Wieczorek
Republican

The 1989 Manchester, New Hampshire, mayoral election was held on November 7, 1989, to elect the mayor of Manchester, New Hampshire. It saw the election of Republican nominee Raymond Wieczorek, who unseated Democratic incumbent Emile Beaulieu by margin of 1,639 votes. The election was a rematch of the 1987 contest between the two. Additionally, Fernand Gelinas ran as an independent candidate.

=== Primaries ===
Primary elections were held on September 19.

==== Democratic primary ====
In the Democratic primary, incumbent Emile Beaulieu narrowly won renomination, with a mere 60 vote margin over alderman and New Hampshire State Representative Leona Dykstra, the closest of his two challengers in the primary.

Dykstra strongly attacked Beaulieu for the city's property tax increase. Bealieu blamed his Republican predecessor, Robert F. Shaw, for the increase. Bealieu's defense came despite the fact that he actually supported the 1988 budget that led to a 17.7% property tax increase during the first year of his term, and that, before leaving office, his predecessor Shaw was actually going to veto this budget.

Dystra pledged to implement zero-based budgeting if elected mayor, which was the method already used by the state government in which it made departments prove claims that they needed more funding. Dykstra also supported charging developers impact fees for infrastructure improvements demanded by their developments.

In the lead up to the election, Bealieu and Dykstra found themselves taking positions on opposing sides of a number of matters. For instance, Dykstra had, around the time of her campaign, she cast a vote against the Board of Alderman allowing the city to potentially issue a $13 million bond to fund an underground parking garage for the controversial proposed Market Square development. Since her vote caused a tie, Bealieu cast a tiebreaking vote, voting in favor of giving the city the option to issue this bond. This vote put them on record as siding on opposite sides of this matter

Despite rainy weather (a drizzle), the primary managed to see roughly 35% turnout among the city's registered Democrats. Turnout had been particularly strong in the city's 6th ward, which was Dkystra's own ward (Dykstra carried that ward by a strong margin).

==== Republican primary ====
In the Republican primary, Raymond Wieczorek, who had been the party's nominee in 1987 (which he narrowly lost to Beaulieu) ran unopposed. Wieczorek was an insurance salesman and the former chairman of the city Republican Party. He had previously served as the head of the Manchester Housing Authority.

=== General election ===
Throughout the general election, incumbent Beaulieu was seen as facing a very strong challenge from Wieczorek.

The increase in property taxes continued to be a damaging issue for Bealieu. Other subjects discussed by the candidates included include waste disposal, a potential expansion of the city's airport, and development in the city's downtown.

Beaulieu attacked Wieczorek by alleging that, during Wieczorek's three-year tenure as head of the Manchester Housing Authority, the agency saw its budget increase by 28%.

Democrat Fernand Gelinas ran as an independent candidate. He was seen as a potential spoiler for Democrats, and won 2,384 votes (which, indeed, was greater than the margin by which Bealieu had lost) by. Gelinas ran a low-key low-budget campaign, but was very active in appearing on the campaign trail. He had good name recognition.

Wieczorek defeated Beaulieu by a margin of 1,639 votes.

== 1991 ==
1991 Manchester, New Hampshire, mayoral election
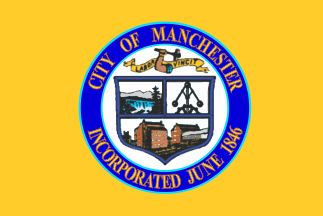
- November 5, 1991
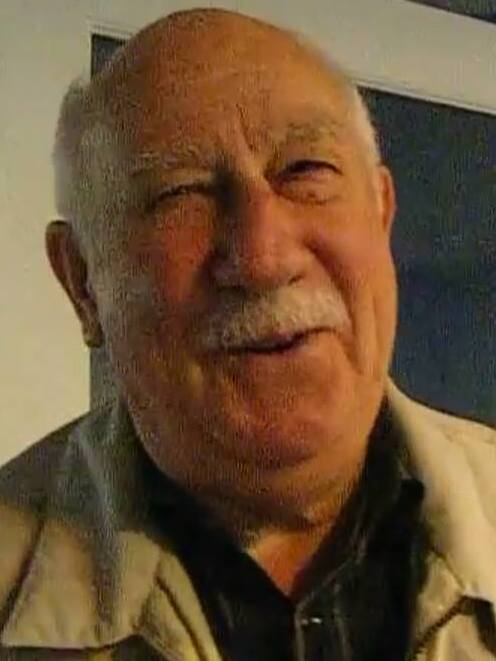

Candidate	Raymond Wieczorek	John J. McDonough
Party	Republican	Democratic
Popular vote	12,960	7,542
Percentage	63.21%	36.79%
Mayor before election
Raymond Wieczorek
Republican
Elected mayor
Raymond Wieczorek
Republican

The 1991 Manchester, New Hampshire, mayoral election was held on November 5, 1991, to elect the mayor of Manchester, New Hampshire. It saw the reelection of Republican incumbent Raymond Wieczorek, who won a landslide victory over Hillsborough County commissioner John J. McDonough, who was the Democratic nominee.

=== Primaries ===
Primary elections were held on September 17. A combined 27% of voters cast votes in the primaries, which was approximately 5% lower than the average of recent previous elections.

Hillsborough County commissioner John J. McDonough ran unopposed in the Democratic primary, and incumbent mayor Raymond Wieczorek ran unopposed in the Republican primary.

=== General election ===
The impacts of the early 1990s recession on the city were seen as being a drag on Weiczorek's reelection hopes. Accordingly, McDonough attacked Weizcorek on the economic downturn in the city. While Weiczorek claimed to have made some economic progress, McDonnough claimed this was untrue.

Both candidates had signed an agreement not to use negative campaign tactics. When McDonough's campaign both accused Wieczorek of having "lied to the voters" and ran an ad which accused Weiczorek of pushing to delay the distribution of tax bills until after election day to aid his reelection chances (which Weiczorek refuted as being a "blatant lie"), Wieczorek registered a complaint with the League of Women Voters, accusing McDonough of having violated this agreement. McDonough denied that he was engaging in negative campaigning.

Weiczorek admitted to his failure to actualize his plan to cut the city budget and identify cost savings had been unsuccessful, but defended himself by saying, "I certainly tried through." He characterized the budget he had been left by his Democratic predecessor Emile Beaulieu as having been a "political one" with sizeable gaps in spending that required resolving, and with labor contracts he lacked the power to change without the consent of the Democratic-majority Board of Aldermen.

Weiczorek pledged to provide more police protection to areas suffering from crime. He also took credit for increasing the size of the police force by 17 officers. McDonough called into question whether that was an accurate number. McDonough laid blame for an increase in crime with Wieczorek.

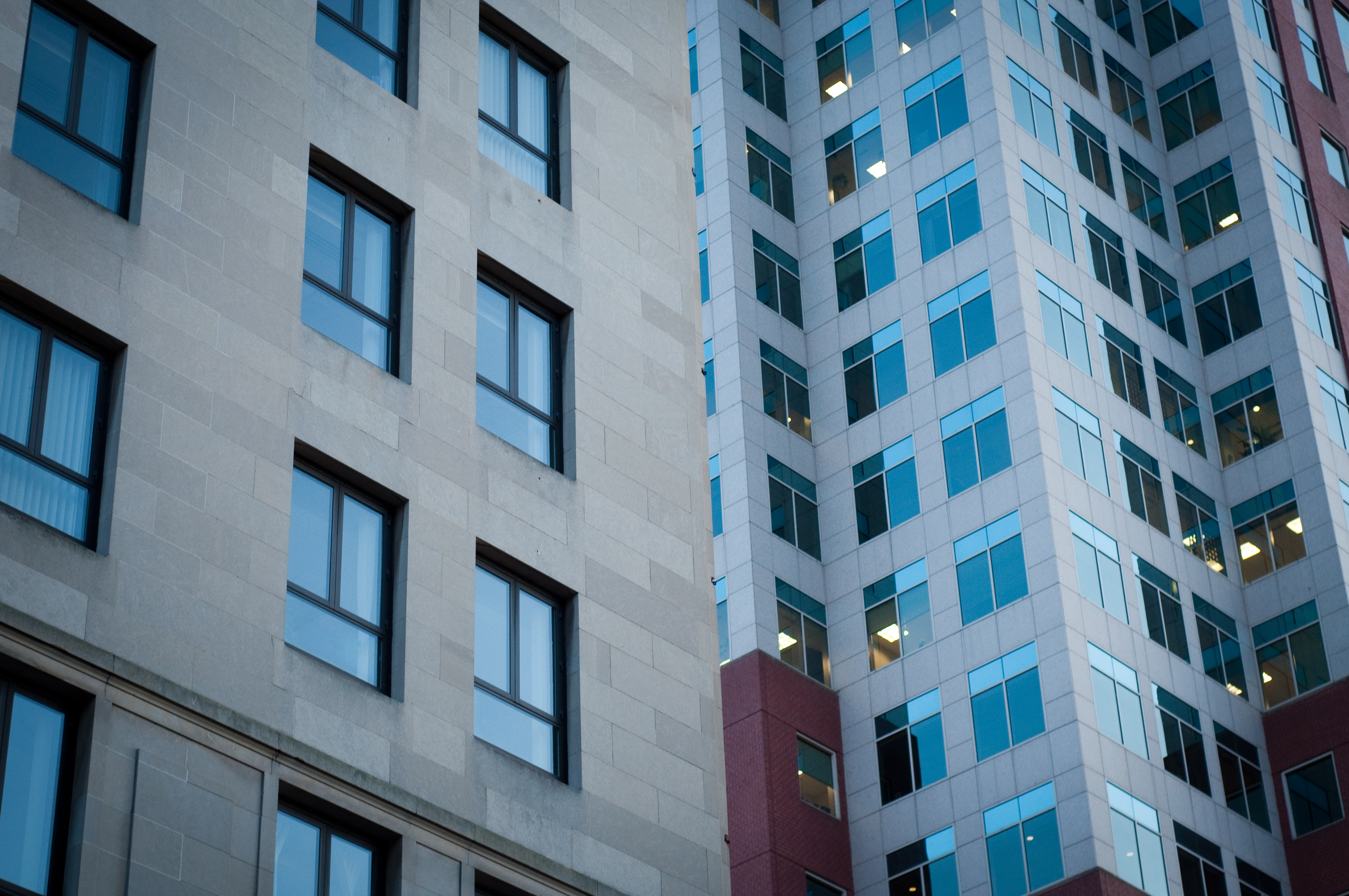
Weiczorek credited himself for the construction of the city's NYNEX building (right)

Weiczorek claimed responsibility for helping convince some employers to remain in the city's downtown, and gave himself credit for the construction of a new industrial park and of the 20-floor NYNEX office building being constructed in the city. McDonough, however, asserted that the mayor did not have anything to do with the NYNEX building, and instead argued that the credit lied with Wieczorek's Democratic predecessor. Wieczorek pledged to keep the city's tax rate stable. McDonough blamed Wieczorek for a rise in city taxes.

Weiczorek proposed a five-year capital plan to fund upgrades and reconstruction of roads, bridges, sewers, and water systems.

McDonough promised to lobby companies to move to the city. His plans included hiring a new coordinator in charge of the recruitment of new business and industry to the city, a job which he said had been vacant for over a year. However, McDonough spent the bulk of his campaign assailing Wieczorek's record, rather than focusing on his own plans for the city. He derided the record of accomplishments that Wieczorek claimed to have as, "phony".

Wieczorek criticized McDonough's record as a county commissioner, including attacking McDonough for supporting a $1.7 million pay increase for employees of the county, and for supporting additions to the county budget which Wieczorek characterized as, "skyrocketing".

Manchester was regarded to be a Democratic Party stronghold.

Weiczorek's reelection was considered to be a landslide victory.

1991 Manchester, New Hampshire, mayoral election results
Party	Candidate	Votes	%
Republican	Raymond Wieczorek (incumbent)	12,960	63.21
Democratic	John J. McDonough	7,542	36.79
Total votes		20,502	100

== 1993 ==
1993 Manchester, New Hampshire, mayoral election
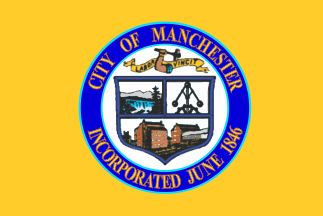
- November 2, 1993
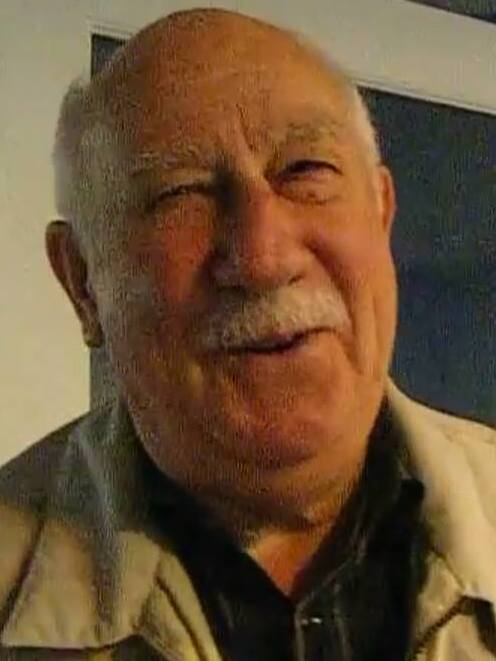

Candidate	Raymond Wieczorek	Robert H. Dennis
Party	Republican	Democratic
Mayor before election
Raymond Wieczorek
Republican
Elected mayor
Raymond Wieczorek
Republican

The 1993 Manchester, New Hampshire, mayoral election was held on November 2, 1993, to elect the mayor of Manchester, New Hampshire. It saw the reelection of Republican incumbent Raymond Wieczorek to a third consecutive term. Wieczorek won a landslide 2–1 victory over alderman Robert H. Dennis, who was the Democratic nominee.

=== Primaries ===
Primary elections were held on September 21.

Two-term alderman Robert H. Dennis defeated 1991 Democratic nominee John J. McDonough in the Democratic primary, and incumbent mayor Raymond Wieczorek ran unopposed in the Republican primary.

=== General election ===
Raymond Wieczorek defeated Robert H. Dennis by a 2–1 margin.

In the coinciding election for the city's Board of Aldermen, for the first time in over six decades, the Republican Party won majority control of the board. Wieczorek, who had battled with the Democratic-majority Board of Aldermen over his two terms as mayor, encouraged city voters to support Republican candidates for the board.

== 1995 ==
1995 Manchester, New Hampshire, mayoral election
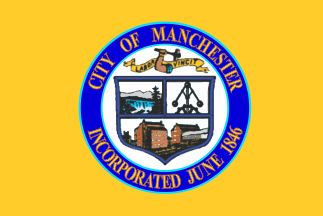
- November 7, 1995
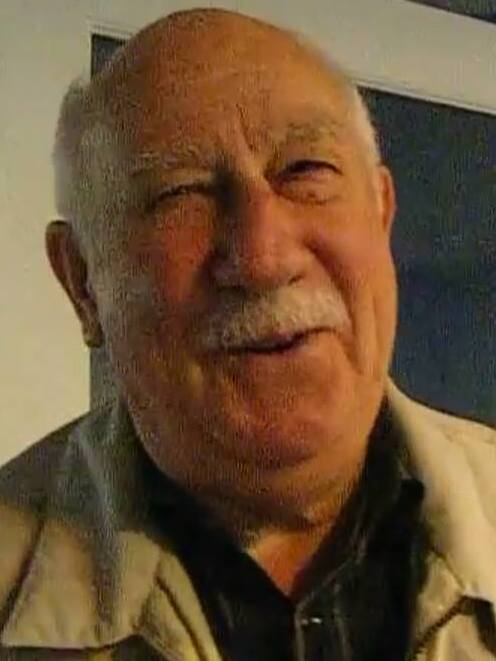

Nominee	Raymond Wieczorek	Robert F. Shaw
Party	Republican	Democratic
Popular vote
Percentage	59.8%	37.7%
Mayor before election
Raymond Wieczorek
Republican
Elected mayor
Raymond Wieczorek
Republican

The 1995 Manchester, New Hampshire, mayoral election was held on November 7, 1995, to elect the mayor of Manchester, New Hampshire. It saw the reelection of incumbent Republican Raymond Wieczorek to a fourth consecutive term. Wieczorek defeated Democratic nominee Robert F. Shaw (who had formerly been a Republican mayor of the city from 1984 through 1987) and Libertarian nominee Robert Howe.

This was the final partisan mayoral election in the city.

=== General election ===
1995 Manchester, New Hampshire, mayoral election
Party	Candidate	Votes	%
Republican	Raymond J. Wieczorek (incumbent)		59.8
Democratic	Robert Shaw		37.7
Libertarian	Robert Howe		2.2
Total votes			100

== 1997 ==
1997 Manchester, New Hampshire, mayoral election
- November 4, 1997
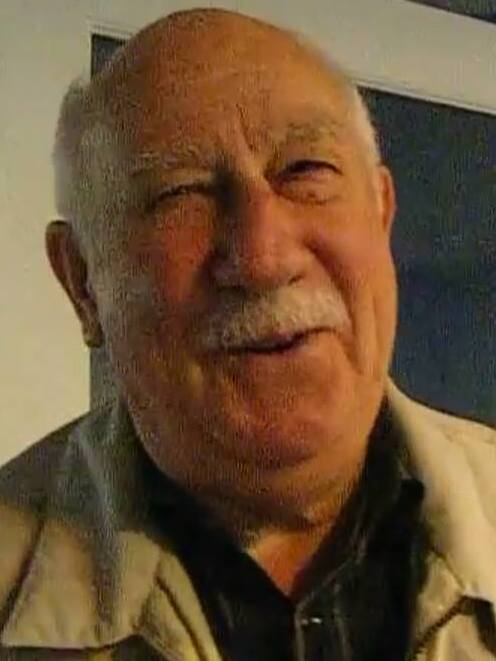

Nominee	Raymond Wieczorek	Robert F. Shaw
Party	Nonpartisan	Nonpartisan
Popular vote	12,441	7,821
Percentage	61.40%	38.60%
Mayor before election
Raymond Wieczorek
Republican
Elected mayor
Raymond Wieczorek
Republican

The 1997 Manchester, New Hampshire, mayoral election was held on November 4, 1997, to elect the mayor of Manchester, New Hampshire. It saw the reelection of Raymond Wieczorek to a fifth consecutive term.

The election was the first to be held under new rules in which the election was formally nonpartisan.

Before the general election, a nonpartisan primary election was held in September to determine the two candidates who would appear on the general election ballot. The general and primary elections both coincided with those for the Manchester Board of Aldermen and the city's school board.

Wieczorek and Shaw had also faced each other in the previous election.

=== Candidates ===
- Robert F. Shaw, former mayor (1984–1987), candidate for the Republican nomination in the 1988 New Hampshire gubernatorial election, and Democratic nominee in the 1995 mayoral election
- Raymond J. Wieczorek, mayor since 1990

While the election was nonpartisan, some candidates had publicly known partisan affiliations. Shaw was a known Democrat. Wieczorek was a known Republican.

=== Results ===
Primary election
Robert F. Shaw and Raymond Wieczorek won the primary.

General election

1997 Manchester, New Hampshire, mayoral election
Candidate	Votes	%
Raymond J. Wieczorek (incumbent)	12,441	61.40
"Bob" Shaw	7,821	38.60
Total votes	20,262	100

== 1999 ==
1999 Manchester, New Hampshire, mayoral election
- November 2, 1999

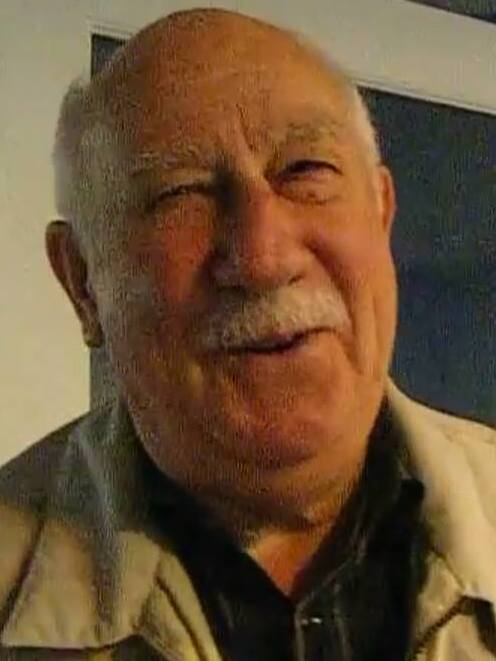
Nominee	Robert A. Baines	Raymond Wieczorek
Party	Nonpartisan	Nonpartisan
Popular vote	12,159	11,327
Percentage	51.77%	48.23%
Mayor before election
Raymond Wieczorek
Republican
Elected mayor
Robert A. Baines
Democratic

The 1999 Manchester, New Hampshire, mayoral election was held on November 2, 1999, to elect the mayor of Manchester, New Hampshire. It saw the election of Robert A. Baines, who unseated fifth-term incumbent mayor Raymond Wieczorek.

The election was formally nonpartisan.

Before the general election, a nonpartisan primary election was held on September 21, 1999, to determine the two candidates who would appear on the general election ballot. The general and primary elections both coincided with those for the Manchester Board of Aldermen. The general election also coincided with the election for welfare commissioner, a school board election. and a ballot question.

=== Candidates ===
- Robert A. Baines, principal of Manchester High School West
- Donna M. Soucy, member of the New Hampshire House of Representatives (1992–1996)
- Raymond J. Wieczorek, mayor since 1990

While the election was nonpartisan, all three candidates had publicly known partisan affiliations. Baines and Soucy were both known Democrats. Wieczorek was a Republican.

=== Results ===
Primary election

1999 Manchester, New Hampshire, mayoral primary election
Candidate	Votes	%
Raymond J. Wieczorek (incumbent)	5,112	35.51
Robert A. Baines	4,945	34.35
Donna M. Soucy	4,340	30.15
Total votes	14,397	100

General election

1999 Manchester, New Hampshire, mayoral election
Candidate	Votes	%
Robert A. Baines	12,159	51.77
Raymond J. Wieczorek (incumbent)	11,327	48.23
Total votes	23,486	100
