= Eugene Reed =

Eugene Reed may refer to:

- Eugene E. Reed (1866–1940), U.S. representative from New Hampshire
- Eugene T. Reed (1923–2002), American dentist and civil rights leader
