= 1968 United States Senate election in New Hampshire =

- November 5, 1968
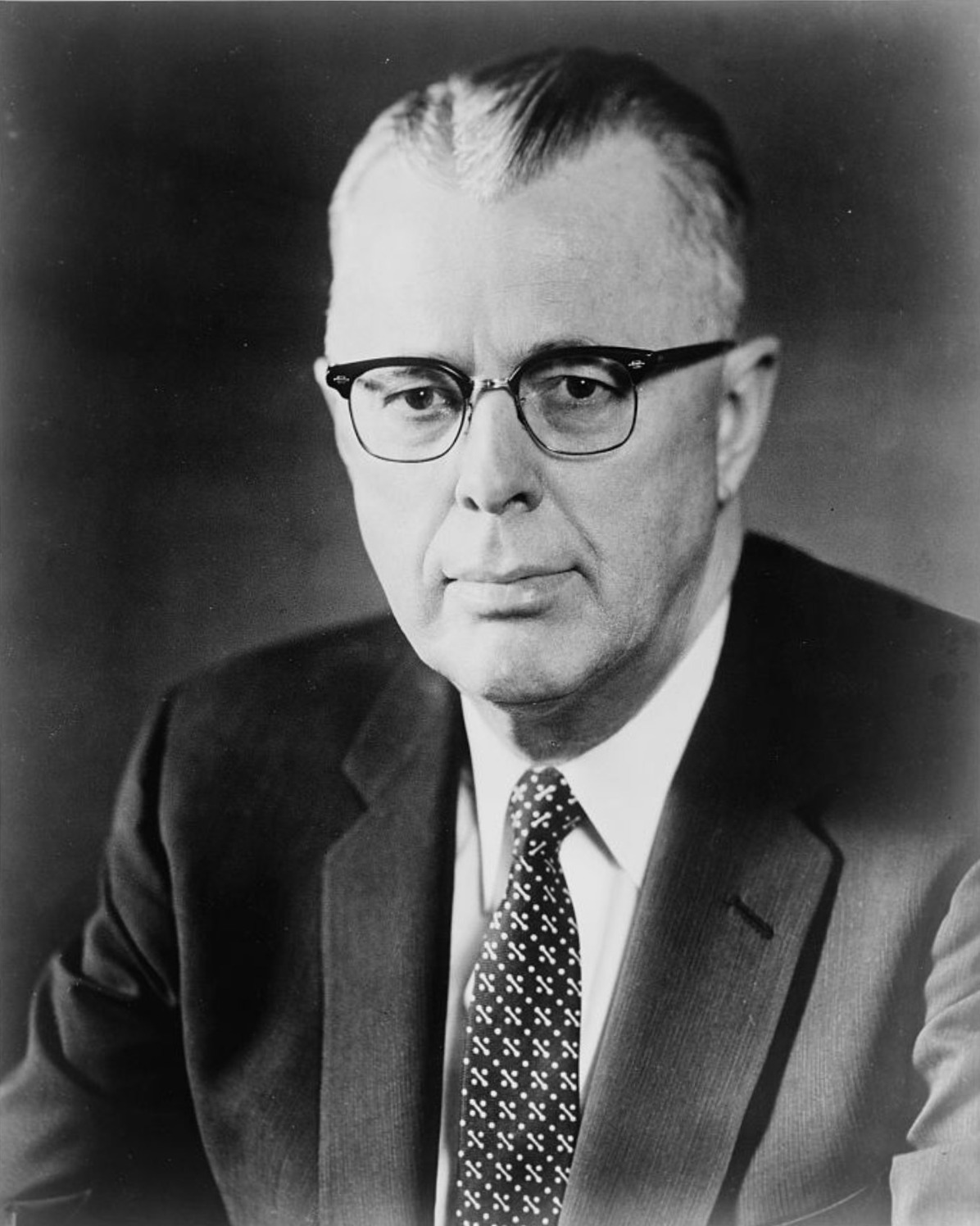

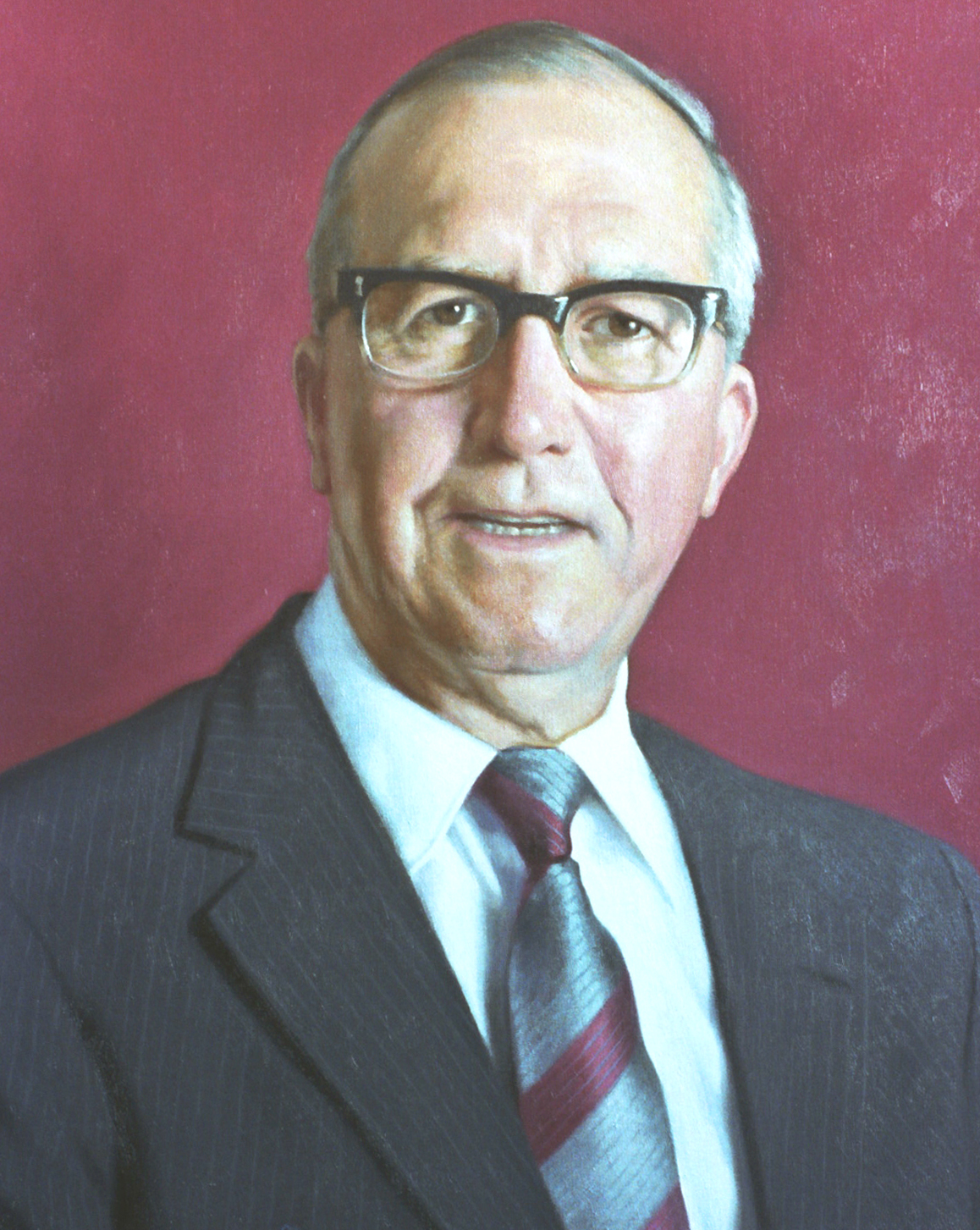
Nominee	Norris Cotton	John W. King
Party	Republican	Democratic
Popular vote	170,163	116,816
Percentage	59.29%	40.70%
- Cotton: 50–60% 60–70% 70–80% 80–90% >90% King: 50–60% 60–70%
U.S. senator before election
Norris Cotton
Republican
Elected U.S. Senator
Norris Cotton
Republican

The 1968 United States Senate election in New Hampshire took place on November 5, 1968. Incumbent Republican Senator Norris Cotton won re-election to a third full term.

== Primary elections ==
Primary elections were held on September 10, 1968.

=== Democratic primary ===
==== Candidates ====
- John W. King, incumbent Governor of New Hampshire

==== Results ====
Democratic primary results
Party	Candidate	Votes	%
Democratic	John W. King	30,593	98.18
Democratic	Write-ins	566	1.82
Total votes		31,159	100.00

=== Republican primary ===
==== Candidates ====
- Norris Cotton, incumbent United States Senator
- John C. Mongan, former Mayor of Manchester, New Hampshire

==== Results ====
Republican primary results
Party	Candidate	Votes	%
Republican	Norris Cotton (incumbent)	78,058	92.39
Republican	John C. Mongan	6,279	7.43
Republican	Write-ins	147	0.17
Total votes		84,484	100.00

== General election ==
=== Results ===
1968 United States Senate election in New Hampshire
Party	Candidate	Votes	%
Republican	Norris Cotton (Incumbent)	170,163	59.29
Democratic	John W. King	116,816	40.70
Write-in		10	0.00
Majority		53,347	18.59
Turnout		286,989	
Republican hold			

== See also ==
- 1968 United States Senate elections

== Bibliography ==
- Congressional Elections, 1946-1996. Washington, D.C.: Congressional Quarterly Inc. 1998. ISBN 1-56802-248-4.
- Stark, Robert L., ed. (1969). Manual for the General Court of New Hampshire. Vol. 41. Concord, NH: Department of State, New Hampshire.
- Scammon, Richard M., ed. (1970). America Votes 8: a handbook of contemporary American election statistics, 1968. Washington, D.C.: Governmental Affairs Institute.
