= 1998 New Hampshire gubernatorial election =

- November 3, 1998
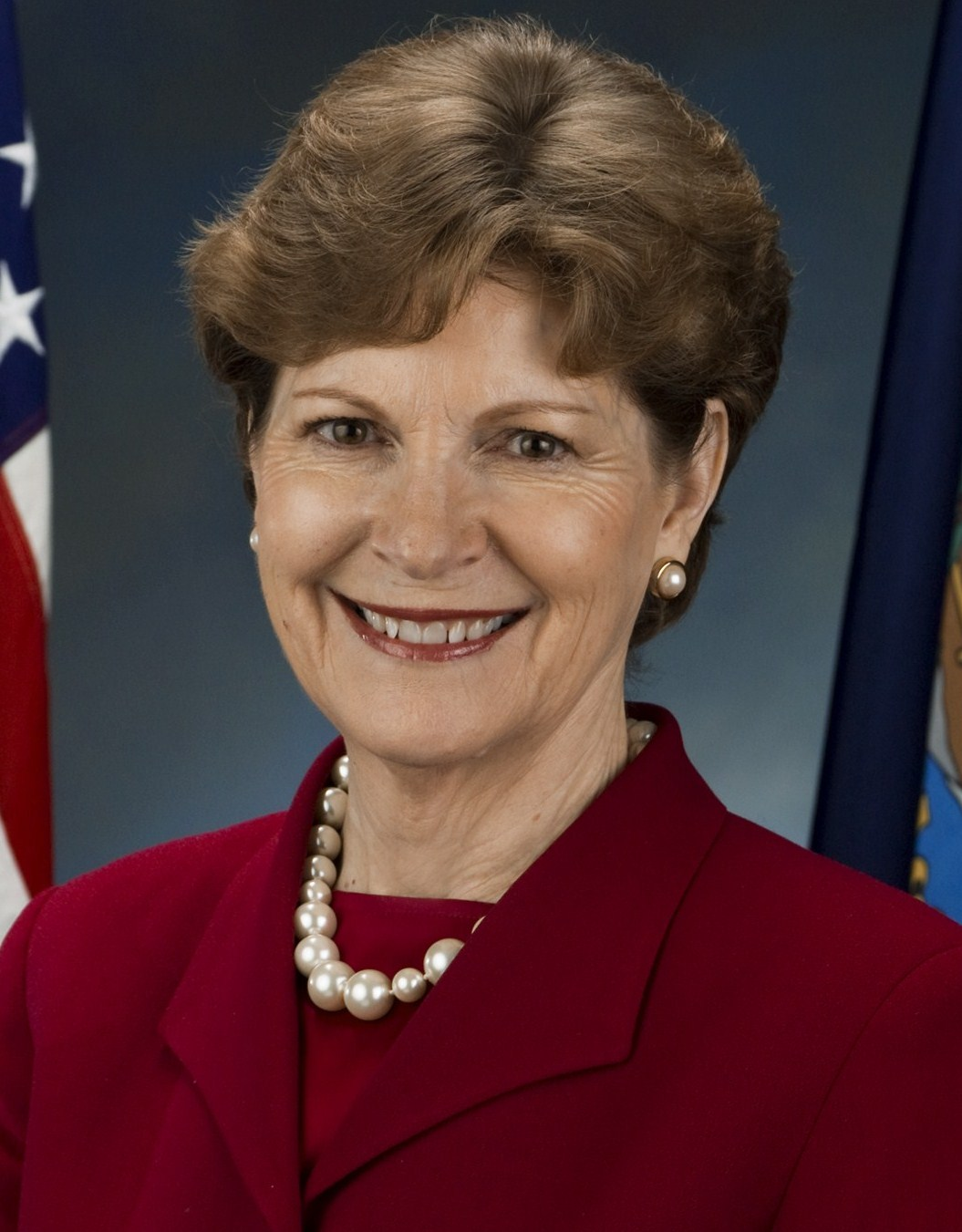

Nominee	Jeanne Shaheen	Jay Lucas
Party	Democratic	Republican
Popular vote	210,769	98,473
Percentage	66.08%	30.88%
- Shaheen: 40–50% 50–60% 60–70% 70–80% 80–90% >90% Lucas: 40–50% 50–60%
Governor before election
Jeanne Shaheen
Democratic
Elected Governor
Jeanne Shaheen
Democratic

The 1998 New Hampshire gubernatorial election took place on November 3, 1998 to elect the governor of New Hampshire. Democratic incumbent Jeanne Shaheen was re-elected to a second term in office over Jay Lucas in a landslide.

== Republican primary ==
=== Candidates ===
- Emile Beaulieu, former mayor of Manchester
- Jim Rubens, state senator from Hanover
- Jay Lucas

== General election ==
=== Candidates ===
- Ken Blevens (Libertarian)
- Jay Lucas (Republican)
- Jeanne Shaheen, incumbent governor since 1997 (Democratic)

=== Polling ===
Poll source	Date(s) administered	Sample size (Note: Key: A – all adults RV – registered voters LV – likely voters V – unclear)	Margin of error	Jeanne Shaheen (D)	Jay Lucas (R)	Undecided
Becker Institute	October 16–18, 1998	355 (LV)	± 5.0%	67%	22%	11%
Mason-Dixon Polling & Strategy	September 28–29, 1998	627 (LV)	± 4.0%	54%	34%	12%
American Research Group	September 9–10, 1998	634 (LV)	± 4.0%	53%	35%	12%
RKM Research	September 9–10, 1998	494 (RV)	± 4.4%	65%	24%	11%
Mason-Dixon Polling & Strategy	June 29–30, 1998	621 (LV)	± 4.0%	57%	22%	21%
RKM Research	June 26–28, 1998	489 (RV)	± 4.0%	61%	21%	18%

=== Results ===
New Hampshire gubernatorial election, 1998
Party	Candidate	Votes	%	±%
Democratic	Jeanne Shaheen (inc.)	210,769	66.08%	+8.91%
Republican	Jay Lucas	98,473	30.88%	−8.62%
Libertarian	Ken Blevens	8,655	2.71%	+1.51%
Write-ins		1,043	0.33%	
Majority		112,296	35.21%	+17.53%
Turnout		318,940		
Democratic hold		Swing		
