= Mayor of Manchester =

Mayor of Manchester may refer to:

== England ==
- List of lord mayors of Manchester, ceremonial mayor of the City of Manchester
- Mayor of Greater Manchester, directly elected mayor of Greater Manchester

== United States ==
- List of mayors of Manchester, New Hampshire, United States
