= Emile Beaulieu =

American politician, twice Mayor of Manchester, New Hampshire

49th and 51st Mayor of Manchester, New Hampshire
- In office 1988–1989
- Preceded by: Robert F. Shaw
- Succeeded by: Raymond Wieczorek
- In office 1982–1983
- Preceded by: Dick Stanton
- Succeeded by: Robert F. Shaw

Manchester Welfare Commissioner
- In office 1974–1981

Member of the New Hampshire House of Representatives
- In office 1973–1974

Personal details
- Born: Emile Dorilas Beaulieu Jr. April 2, 1931 Nashua, New Hampshire
- Died: December 30, 2016 (aged 85) Manchester, New Hampshire
- Party: Republican (since 1995)
- Other political affiliations: Democratic (before 1995)
- Spouse(s): Pauline Leclerc (?–1994; her death); Laurette Beaulieu (?–2016; his death)

Emile Dorilas Beaulieu Jr. (April 2, 1931 – December 30, 2016) was an American politician who served two nonconsecutive terms as the Mayor of Manchester, New Hampshire, from 1982 until 1983 and again from 1988 until 1989.

== Biography ==
=== Early and personal life ===
Beaulieu was born in Nashua on April 2, 1931, the son of Emile Dorilas Beaulieu, Sr. and Albina Claveau Beaulieu. His parents, who struggled to financially support a large family, sent him to live at St. Joseph's Orphanage twice during his childhood. He left school after sixth grade to work.

One of Beaulieu's earliest jobs was at McElwain Shoes, where he met his first wife, the former Pauline Leclerc. The couple had six children during their marriage, which lasted until Pauline Beaulieu's death in 1994. Beaulieu's daughter, Jane Beaulieu, was a Democratic member of the New Hampshire House of Representatives.

Beaulieu later married his second wife, Laurette Fournier; their marriage lasted until his death in December 2016.

He owned and operated Beaulieu Floor Coverings, Inc. He served in the New Hampshire National Guard from 1948 until 1968, including during the Korean War and the Berlin Crisis of 1961.

=== Early political career ===
Beaulieu's political career began with his election to the New Hampshire House of Representatives in 1973. In 1974, he was elected the Manchester city Welfare Commissioner, a position he held until he was elected mayor in 1981.

=== Mayor of Manchester ===
In 1981, Beaulieu, a Democrat, challenged and defeated four-term incumbent mayor Dick Stanton, who was seeking re-election in the city's mayoral election. During his first term, Beaulieu partnered with city coordinator John Hoben to spearhead to construct and open the Center of New Hampshire. The center, which includes a hotel and convention center, has been credited with redeveloping Manchester's downtown business district. Beaulieu also promoted the Amoskeag Millyard Urban Renewal Project and the development of Arms Park and Bass Island. Riverfest, an annual community festival, was revitalized during Beaulieu's tenure.

Despite the economic benefits of the Center of New Hampshire, the project may have hurt Beaulieu politically, according to Sylvio Dupuis, another former Manchester mayor. Beaulieu lost his re-election after one term to Republican Robert F. Shaw in the 1983 Manchester mayoral race.

Beaulieu later made a political comeback by winning the mayoral election for second term in 1987, serving again from 1988 to 1989. During this term, he and other city officials traveled to Neustadt an der Weinstraße, West Germany, and Taichung, Taiwan, to establish sister city relationships during the 1980s. He also approved the creation of Manchester Community Television in 1989.' During his second tenure as mayor, he made a successful effort at stopping the movie The Last Temptation of Christ from being shown in theaters in the city, and an unsuccessful appearance to stop the band Metallica from appearing in the city.

The Manchester city government passed a double-digit property tax increase during his second term, which hurt his popularity. He was defeated for election by Republican Raymond Wieczorek in 1989.

=== Later Civic and political career ===
In 1995, Beaulieu switched his party affiliation from Democratic to Republican, citing his pro-life stances.

He announced his candidacy for governor of New Hampshire in the 1998 gubernatorial election, but lost the Republican primary.

Beaulieu's community involvement over the years has been extensive. He was the founder and past president of Big Brothers Big Sisters of Greater Manchester. Beaulieu has served on the board of directors of several organizations, including the State Employment Training Council and the Child Health Services.

He remained active in the city's Republican Party and worked on Mayor Frank Guinta's 2005 election campaign. On Thursday, May 31, 2007, Beaulieu was named honorary co-chairman of Guinta's re-election campaign, despite the fact that his daughter, Jane Beaulieu, a Democrat and New Hampshire state representative, was considering a potential campaign for mayor against Guinta.

=== Later life ===
Beaulieu suffered a stroke in 2016. He died at Catholic Medical Center in Manchester, New Hampshire, on December 30, 2016, at the age of 85. He was survived by his second wife of 25 years, Laurette Beaulieu; his five children, three step-children, 13 grandchildren and 10 great-grandchildren.

== Political positions ==
Bealieu supported anti-abortion organizations, including being a member of the New Hampshire Right to Life Committee.

== See also ==
- List of mayors of Manchester, New Hampshire
