= Mayoral elections in Manchester, New Hampshire =

Elections for mayor in Hartford, Connecticut

Elections are currently held every two years to elect the mayor of Manchester, New Hampshire.

== Election laws and general history ==
The city's mayoral elections are currently are nonpartisan, a change which was adopted before the 1999 election. While, prior to 1999, elections had long been partisan, there had been stretches previous to 1999 in which the city's mayoral elections had been nonpartisan, including the stretch of four elections held from 1953 through 1959.

Under current election laws, in order to be eligible to be elected mayor, one must be a resident of the city for at least one year prior to filing for the office of mayor.

The rules of the original 1846 city charter, in effect for the city's earliest elections, required that, to be elected, a candidate needed to receive a majority of the vote in a mayoral election. If no candidate received a majority, or if the winning candidate refused to take office, further election(s) would be held until an election produced a candidate with a majority of the vote.

From 1846 to 1857, mayors served for a one-year term, expiring on the third Tuesday in March. From 1857 to 1872, the mayor's term expired on the last day of December. In 1873, the term ended annually on the third Tuesday in March, up until 1880, when it became a two-year term.
