= Cyrus A. Sulloway =

American politician (1839–1917)

Cyrus Adams Sulloway
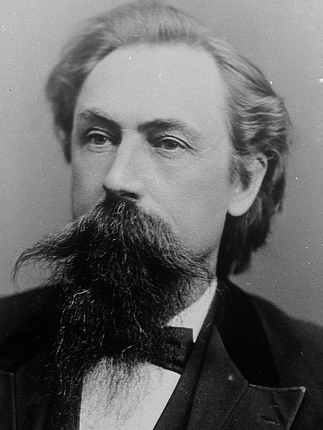
- Sulloway in an 1897 publication

Member of the U.S. House of Representatives from New Hampshire's 1st district
- In office March 4, 1915 – March 11, 1917
- Preceded by: Eugene Elliott Reed
- Succeeded by: Sherman Everett Burroughs
- In office March 4, 1895 – March 3, 1913
- Preceded by: Henry W. Blair
- Succeeded by: Eugene Elliott Reed

Member of the New Hampshire House of Representatives
- In office 1873–1878

Personal details
- Born: June 8, 1839 Grafton, New Hampshire
- Died: March 11, 1917 (aged 77) Washington, D.C.
- Party: Republican
- Profession: Attorney

Cyrus Adams Sulloway (June 8, 1839 – March 11, 1917) was an attorney and Republican member of the United States House of Representatives from New Hampshire.

== Biography ==
Sulloway studied law and was admitted to the bar in 1863.

Sulloway served as a member of the New Hampshire House of Representatives from 1873 to 1878.

Sulloway served in the United States House of Representatives from March 4, 1895, to March 3, 1913, and from March 4, 1915, until his death in Washington, D.C.. In his 1896 reelection he won with a majority of 11,733.

== See also ==
- List of members of the United States Congress who died in office (1900–1949)

== Notes ==
U.S. House of Representatives
Preceded by Henry W. Blair	U.S. Representative for the 1st district of New Hampshire; March 4, 1895–March 3, 1913	Succeeded by Eugene E. Reed
Preceded by Eugene E. Reed	U.S. Representative for the 1st district of New Hampshire; March 4, 1915–March 11, 1917	Succeeded by Sherman E. Burroughs
