= Josephat T. Benoit =

American politician

41st Mayor of Manchester, New Hampshire
- In office 1944–1961
- Preceded by: Wilfred A. Laflamme
- Succeeded by: John C. Mongan

Personal details
- Born: March 3, 1900 Sainte-Madeleine, Quebec, Canada
- Died: May 14, 1976 (aged 76) Manchester, New Hampshire, U.S.
- Party: Democratic
- Education: Université de Montréal, Sorbonne
- Profession: newspaper editor

Josephat T. Benoit (March 3, 1900 – May 14, 1976) was a Canadian-born American journalist and politician who served as the 41st mayor of Manchester, New Hampshire, from 1944 to 1961. A New Deal Democrat, he held that office for a record nine consecutive terms.

== Early life and career ==
Benoit was born in Sainte-Madeleine, Quebec, on March 3, 1900. The youngest of seven children, he migrated to Fitchburg, Massachusetts, with his family in 1907. He received two Ph.D.s in his lifetime: one in philosophy from the Université de Montréal in 1921, the other in political economy and sociology from the Sorbonne in 1935. He also received two honorary degrees: a Doctor of Literature from the Université de Montréal and a Doctor of Laws from Saint Anselm College.

He was an editor of numerous French-language newspapers in Pawtucket, Rhode Island, Woonsocket, Rhode Island, Fitchburg, Massachusetts, and Sudbury, Massachusetts. He moved to Manchester in 1937 and took the position of editor-in-chief of L'Avenir National, a French-language daily newspaper. He remained in that position until 1943 when he entered local politics.

== Political career ==
Benoit first became involved in American politics through his journalism career. He worked as an organizer, speaker and French newspaper publisher for Roosevelt-for-President during the United States presidential elections of 1932 and 1936.

Benoit first ran for mayor of Manchester in 1943, defeating the sitting Republican mayor, Wilfred A. Laflamme. He quickly rose to prominence in New Hampshire politics, serving as Chairman of the New Hampshire State Democratic Committee in 1944. In this capacity, he was chosen as a delegate to the 1944 Democratic National Convention in Chicago, where President Franklin D. Roosevelt was nominated for an unprecedented fourth term. Benoit was the head of Roosevelt's Granite State re-election campaign in 1944. Roosevelt carried the state by over 9,000 votes. The following year, Benoit was named state chair of the New Hampshire Democratic Party.

He was re-elected mayor in 1945 and, having completed only one term, launched an unsuccessful bid for New Hampshire's 1st congressional district in 1946 against sitting Republican Chester E. Merrow. In 1949, he co-founded the French-language newspaper "L'Action."

Benoit went on to win seven additional mayoral elections, each against a different candidate. He served as a keynote speaker at the state Democratic Convention in 1958. In 1959, he defeated John C. Mongan, the man who became his successor. After serving nine consecutive terms as mayor, Benoit retired from politics in 1961. He cited two reasons for his retirement: pressure from his family and the city's return to partisan elections after ten years of non-partisan elections. Over 1,400 people attended a testimonial in his honor in December 1961 held at the State Armory.

During his tenure as mayor, many of Manchester's current schools were built. He supported the establishment of public housing in Manchester and opposed fluoridation of the city's water supply. He was instrumental in the Millyard Urban Renewal Project in Manchester's millyard, originally home to the Amoskeag Manufacturing Company. He was also involved in the development of Grenier Field, now the Manchester-Boston Regional Airport.

== Writings ==
Benoit was the author of three works:

- Rois ou Esclaves de la Machine [Kings or Slaves of the Machine] (Political Economy, Montréal, 1931)
- L'Âme Franco-Américaine [The Franco-American Soul] (Sociology, Paris and Montréal, 1935)
- Catéchisme d'Histoire Franco-Américaine [Catechism of Franco-American history] (Manchester, 1938–1940, three editions)

== Post-politics and death ==
After retiring from politics in 1961, Benoit served as the director of New Hampshire's Small Business Administration until his retirement in 1973. In 1962, he was selected "Citizen of the Year" in Manchester and was honored at the first statewide Brotherhood Dinner of the National Conference of Christians and Jews, now the National Conference for Community and Justice.

He was a Knight of the Order of St. Gregory the Great. He was an associate member of the Société des Gens de Lettres in Paris (1935) and a holder of the Richelieu Medal from the French Academy in 1936, where he was an officer in Paris in 1937. He received the Grand Medal and Diploma from the Alliance française in Paris in 1945.

He died in Manchester on May 14, 1976, and was buried at Mount Calvary Cemetery in the same city. He was survived by his son, Jean Benoit, a daughter, Francoise (Benoit) Lozier, and two grandchildren.
