= Henry J. Pariseau =

American politician (1918–1970)

45th Mayor of Manchester, New Hampshire
- In office 1970 – May 30, 1970
- Preceded by: John C. Mongan
- Succeeded by: Charles R. Stanton

Personal details
- Born: Henry J. Pariseau Jr. April 1, 1918 Manchester, New Hampshire, U.S.
- Died: May 30, 1970 (aged 52)
- Party: Republican
- Occupation: Politician

Henry J. Pariseau Jr. (April 1, 1918 – May 30, 1970) was an American politician who briefly served as the 45th mayor of Manchester, New Hampshire, in 1970 as a member of the Republican Party.

== Early life ==
Pariseau was born in Manchester, New Hampshire, on April 1, 1918, as the first child of Henry J. and Margaret Connolly Pariseau.

== Career ==
Pariseau served as chairman of the board and president of Auclair Trucking, in addition to owning and serving as president of two other businesses: P & S Leasing and Atlas Warehouse. He also served as fire commissioner from 1962 to 1970.

A member of the Republican Party, Pariseau became the 45th mayor of Manchester, New Hampshire, in 1970, serving until his death five months into his term. During his short tenure as mayor, Pariseau was instrumental in obtaining firefighting apparatus for the city, and concern for the environment led to his involvement in the Urban Beautification project, designed to create a pollution-free environment. Pariseau was preceded in office by Republican John C. Mongan and succeeded by Democrat Charles R. Stanton.

== Personal life and death ==
Pariseau was president of the Holy Name Society, St. Vincent de Paul, and the New Hampshire Truck Owner's Association. Additionally, he was a founding member of the 100 Club of New Hampshire and was active in the Pine Haven Home for Boys.

Pariseau was a Catholic.

Pariseau died of a heart attack at the age of 52 on May 30, 1970.

== See also ==
- Mayoral elections in Manchester, New Hampshire, in the 20th century

Political offices
Preceded by John C. Mongan	Mayor of Manchester, New Hampshire; 1970	Succeeded by Charles R. Stanton
