= Robert A. Baines =

American politician (1946–2026)

Robert Baines

Member of the Manchester Board of Schools Committee from Ward 9
- In office 1974–1978
- Preceded by: Gerald Connors
- Succeeded by: Donna Beauparlant
- In office 2024–2026
- Preceded by: Ben Dion

53rd Mayor of Manchester
- In office 2000–2006
- Preceded by: Raymond Wieczorek
- Succeeded by: Frank Guinta

Personal details
- Born: June 25, 1946 Manchester, New Hampshire, U.S.
- Died: January 23, 2026 (aged 79) Boston, Massachusetts, U.S.
- Party: Democratic
- Spouse: Maureen McCaugney (m. 1974)
- Children: 3

Robert A. Baines (June 25, 1946 – January 23, 2026) was an American politician who served as the 53rd mayor of Manchester, New Hampshire, from 2000 to 2006. A Democrat, he was first elected in November 1999, defeating incumbent Republican Raymond Wieczorek. Manchester mayoral elections are held every other year. In Baines' last successful bid for the office, he was elected by over two-thirds of the voters. He was defeated by Republican Alderman Frank Guinta on November 8, 2005.

== Early life and career ==
Robert Baines was born in Manchester, New Hampshire, on June 25, 1946, to Henry Baines and Rena Knee. He graduated from Manchester Memorial High School in 1964. He earned his bachelor's degree in music education from Keene State College located in Keene, New Hampshire, in 1968. He earned his master's in school administration in 1976 from Rivier College; he has done additional graduate study at the University of New Hampshire. He married his wife, Maureen, in 1974.

From 1968 to 1977 he was first a music teacher at Alvirne High School in Hudson, New Hampshire before becoming assistant principal in the same school. 1980 saw Baines become principal of Manchester High School West, a position he was to hold until 1999, when he became mayor.

Baines was father of three children: Timothy, Christina, and Catherine. He was grandfather of Jacob and Lucas Miller (sons of Christina Vincent and Michael Miller) as well as Shea and Beau Gardner (sons of Catherine and Ryan Gardner).

On July 21, 2006, Baines underwent surgery at Elliot Hospital in Manchester to remove a blockage in his colon. It was later revealed to have been a cancerous growth.

He served on the Board of Directors for the National Association of Secondary School Principals and was an Executive in Residence at Southern New Hampshire University. In June 2007 Baines was named interim president of Chester College of New England, a position he was slated to hold for one year while the college searched for a replacement for former college president William Nevious. He was subsequently named president of the college and held that position until 2012. The Board of Trustees made the decision to close the college because of declining enrollment. The faculty and staff of the college reported a vote of no confidence in Baines prior the closing. He was the Director of STEAM Ahead in NH, an educational initiative based in Manchester that focuses on Science, Technology, Engineering, Arts and Math. The project is supported by Dyn and SilverTech and is a collaboration with the Manchester School District, Manchester High School WEST, Manchester Community College and the University System of New Hampshire.

== Political career and distinctions ==
Baines served two terms on the Manchester Board of Schools Committee in the early 1970s. He was a member of the 39th Army Band, New Hampshire National Guard from 1970 to 1976, and was awarded the New Hampshire Principal of the Year in 1990. 1996 saw him receive the Educator of the Year award from the Manchester Chamber of Commerce. In 2004 and 2005, he was named one of New Hampshire's "Ten Most Powerful People" by Business NH Magazine. As noted above, he was elected mayor of the city of Manchester in 1999, and reelected in 2001 and 2003. He was defeated in a dramatic upset in 2005 after being harshly criticized for several years of consecutive property tax increases.

He was a trustee for the University System of New Hampshire.

On May 11, 2007, a New Hampshire Union Leader blog reported that Baines said he will not seek elected office again.

The Manchester rock band Moes Haven wrote a song called "Bring Back Bob Baines" in their 2006 album "September: In Manchvegas."

In 2023, Baines would shockingly announce his candidacy for the Manchester Board of Schools Committee running out of Ward 9. Baines held this same position almost 50 years prior, when he served in the early 1970s. He would go on to be uncontested in the election and served another term on the board. In July 2025, Baines filed for reelection to the school board. He won with 72% of the votes cast.

== Death ==
Baines died from complications following a medical procedure at a Boston hospital on January 23, 2026, at the age of 79.

== Electoral history ==
1999 Manchester, New Hampshire, mayoral election
Party	Candidate	Votes	%	±%
Democratic	Robert A. Baines	12,159	51.8	
Republican	Raymond J. Wieczorek (incumbent)	11,327	48.2	

2001 Manchester, New Hampshire, mayoral election
Party	Candidate	Votes	%	±%
Democratic	Robert A. Baines (incumbent)	12,321	57.3	+5.5
Republican	Richard H. Girard	9,187	42.7	

2003 Manchester, New Hampshire, mayoral election
Party	Candidate	Votes	%	±%
Democratic	Robert A. Baines (incumbent)	11,742	66.7	+9.4
Republican	Carlos Gonzales	5,106	29.0	
Democratic	Bob Shaw	745	4.2	

- Note: Bob Shaw was a write-in candidate who happened to be affiliated with the Democratic Party.

2005 Manchester, New Hampshire, mayoral election
Party	Candidate	Votes	%	±%
Republican	Frank Guinta	10,125	51.3	
Democratic	Robert A. Baines (incumbent)	9,597	48.7	−18.0

Political offices
Preceded by Raymond Wieczorek	Mayor of Manchester, New Hampshire; 2000–2006	Succeeded by Frank Guinta
