= Roland S. Vallee =

American politician

43rd Mayor of Manchester, New Hampshire
- In office 1964–1967
- Preceded by: John C. Mongan
- Succeeded by: John C. Mongan

Personal details
- Born: November 13, 1929 Manchester, New Hampshire, U.S.
- Died: October 27, 1997 (aged 67) Palm Beach Gardens, Florida, U.S.
- Party: Democratic
- Education: Saint Anselm College, University of New Hampshire

Roland S. Vallee (November 13, 1929 – October 27, 1997) was an American politician who served as the 43rd mayor of Manchester, New Hampshire. Known as the "singing mayor," he served in that office as a Democrat from 1964 to 1967.

== Life and career ==
Vallee was born on November 13, 1929, in Manchester, New Hampshire, to Wilfred and Marie Anna (Hudon) Vallee. He went to Saint Anselm College and the University of New Hampshire, and served in the United States Navy from 1948 to 1953.

Vallee was once a nightclub singer.

Mayor Vallee began his political career as an alderman. He used his rich baritone voice as an easy way to make acquaintances and be seen by people. During his administration, Manchester was one of 75 cities chosen to be part of the federal Model Cities Program. As part of President Johnson's Great Society Program, the goal was to rehabilitate "blighted" city areas. Vallee's concern for urban renewal also sparked his involvement in the Amoskeag Millyard Project.

Vallee owned and operated two Manchester corporations: Val Construction Company and Valco Realty.

Mayor Vallee died in Palm Beach Gardens, Florida, in 1997 at the age of 67.

His current living relatives include Roger Vallee. Roger Vallee fathered Kevin Vallee as well as Donna-Jean Mattia. Grandsons and granddaughter of Roger include Jason Mattia, Michael Mattia, and Amanda Vallee.

== See also ==
- Mayoral elections in Manchester, New Hampshire in the 20th century
