= Eugene E. Reed =

American politician (1866–1940)

Eugene Elliott Reed
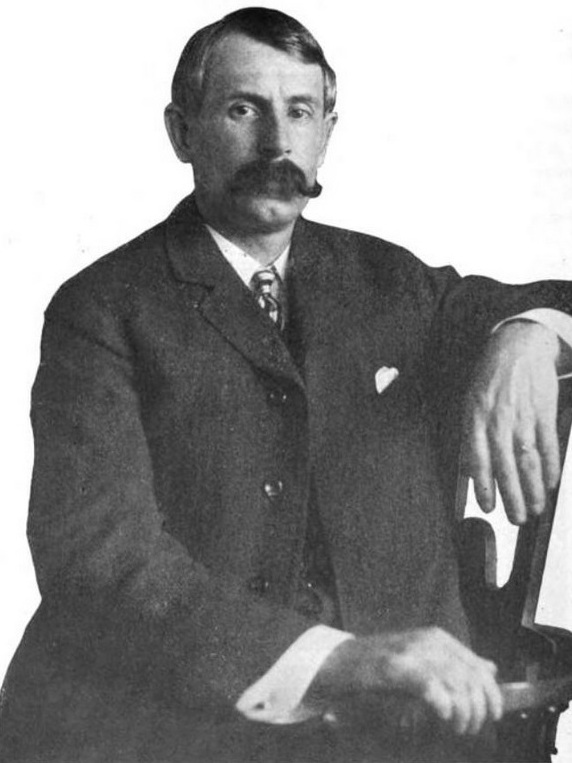
- Reed as mayor of Manchester in 1903.

Member of the U.S. House of Representatives from New Hampshire's 1st district
- In office March 4, 1913 – March 3, 1915
- Preceded by: Cyrus A. Sulloway
- Succeeded by: Cyrus A. Sulloway

32nd Mayor of Manchester, New Hampshire
- In office 1903–1911
- Preceded by: William C. Clarke
- Succeeded by: Edward Clarke Smith

Member of the Manchester Board of Aldermen
- In office 1899–1903

Personal details
- Born: April 23, 1866 Manchester, New Hampshire
- Died: December 23, 1940 (aged 74)
- Party: Democratic

Eugene Elliott Reed (April 23, 1866 – December 15, 1940) was a U.S. representative from New Hampshire.

== Biography ==
Born in Manchester, Reed attended the public schools and received instruction from private tutors. He studied law, then engaged in the construction contracting business, serving as director and officer of numerous New England and New York corporations. He was an alderman of Manchester, 1899–1903, and served as mayor, 1903–1911, having been elected in 1902, 1904, 1906, and 1908.

Reed served as Democratic National and State committeeman for twelve years and was a delegate to the Democratic National Conventions of 1908, 1912, 1916, and 1924. He was an unsuccessful candidate for election in 1910 to the Sixty-second Congress, but was elected as a Democrat to the Sixty-third Congress (March 4, 1913 – March 3, 1915). He was an unsuccessful candidate for reelection in 1914 to the Sixty-fourth Congress.

He was appointed by President Wilson to the Philippine Commission and served as secretary of commerce and police in 1916. He negotiated the purchase and was the first American president under the Philippine ownership of the Manila Railroad Company in January 1917. Reed eventually resigned as president and chairman of the board of directors after his first year of service. He returned to the United States in 1918.

He was an unsuccessful candidate for United States Senator in 1918, then engaged in the general export business in New York 1919–1922. He served as vice president of United Life & Accident Insurance Co., Concord, New Hampshire, from 1922 to 1931. He was National Recovery Administration director for New Hampshire in 1933 and 1934 and State Director of the National Emergency Council and Federal Housing Agency, 1934–1939. He was a member of the New Hampshire Emergency Flood Relief and Rehabilitation Committee in 1936 and served on the New Hampshire Disaster Relief Committee in 1938. He was the regional director for New England, Office of Government Reports, in 1939 and 1940.

He died in Manchester, December 15, 1940, and was interred in Pine Grove Cemetery.

Party political offices
First	Democratic nominee for U.S. Senator from New Hampshire (Class 2); 1918	Succeeded by George E. Farrand
U.S. House of Representatives
Preceded by Cyrus A. Sulloway	U.S. Representative for the 1st district of New Hampshire; March 4, 1913 – March 3, 1915	Succeeded by Cyrus A. Sulloway
