= Raymond Wieczorek =

American politician (1928–2022)

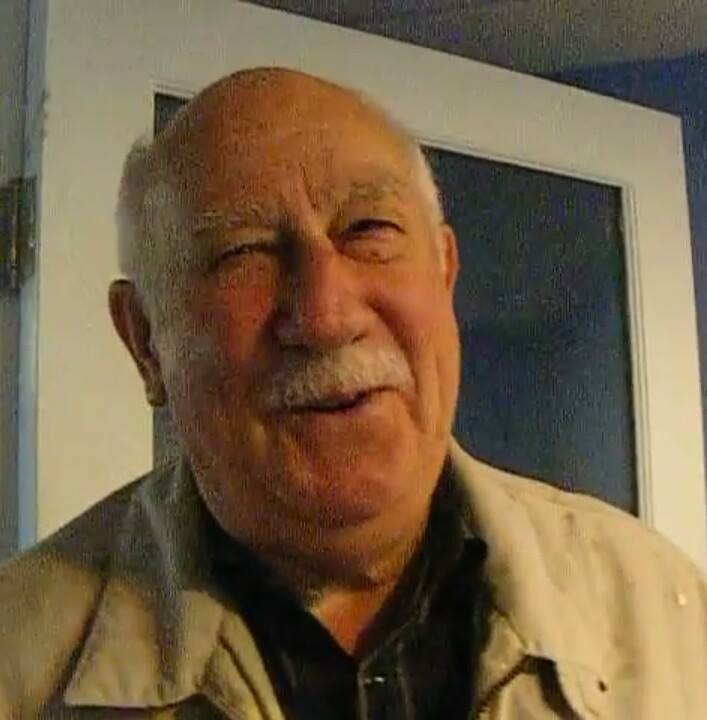
- Wieczorek in 2012

Member of the Executive Council of New Hampshire from the 4th district
- In office 2002–2012
- Preceded by: Thomas P. Colantuono
- Succeeded by: Chris Pappas

52nd Mayor of Manchester
- In office 1990–2000
- Preceded by: Emile Beaulieu
- Succeeded by: Robert A. Baines

Personal details
- Born: December 9, 1928 New Britain, Connecticut, U.S.
- Died: November 22, 2022 (aged 93) Manchester, New Hampshire, U.S.
- Party: Republican
- Spouses: Catherine Connare; Susan Kramas (died 2008)
- Children: 3

Raymond Joseph Wieczorek (December 9, 1928 – November 22, 2022) was an American businessman and politician from Manchester, New Hampshire. A Republican, he was mayor of the city from 1990 to 2000, and represented District 4 on the Executive Council of New Hampshire from 2002 to 2012.

== Career ==
Wieczorek was the director and president of the Manchester Scholarship Foundation between 1973 and 1976. He became commissioner of the Manchester Housing and Redevelopment Authority in 1984, and was its chairman from 1986 to 1989.

He served five terms as mayor of Manchester in the 1990s. He won his first term in 1989 when he defeated incumbent Democrat Emile Beaulieu, who was seeking re-election.

Wieczorek was defeated in the 1999 election by his Democratic challenger, Robert A. Baines.

Wieczorek ran for Council to replace Republican Thomas Colantuono, who had resigned after being appointed United States Attorney for New Hampshire. Wieczorek defeated the Democratic nominee, state Rep. John Kacavas, and was elected to the Council in 2002.

He is best known for the redevelopment of the Amoskeag Millyard, the development of the Manchester–Boston Regional Airport, the conversion of the city budget to fiscal year from a calendar year, and the creation of a downtown Manchester civic center. The access road to the airport, Raymond Wieczorek Drive, is named after him.

== Personal life and death ==
Wieczorek was a Korean War veteran, having served in the U.S. Army. He was a member of the American Legion and Veterans of Foreign Wars, and owner of the Wieczorek Insurance Agency. He was married twice, first to Catherine Connare and then to Susan Kramas, who died in 2008. He had three children.

In 2001, Wieczorek was awarded an honorary Doctor of Law from New Hampshire College (now Southern New Hampshire University).

Wieczorek died at Catholic Medical Center in Manchester on November 22, 2022, aged 93, after a period of declining health.
