= Eugene T. Reed =

American dentist and civil rights leader

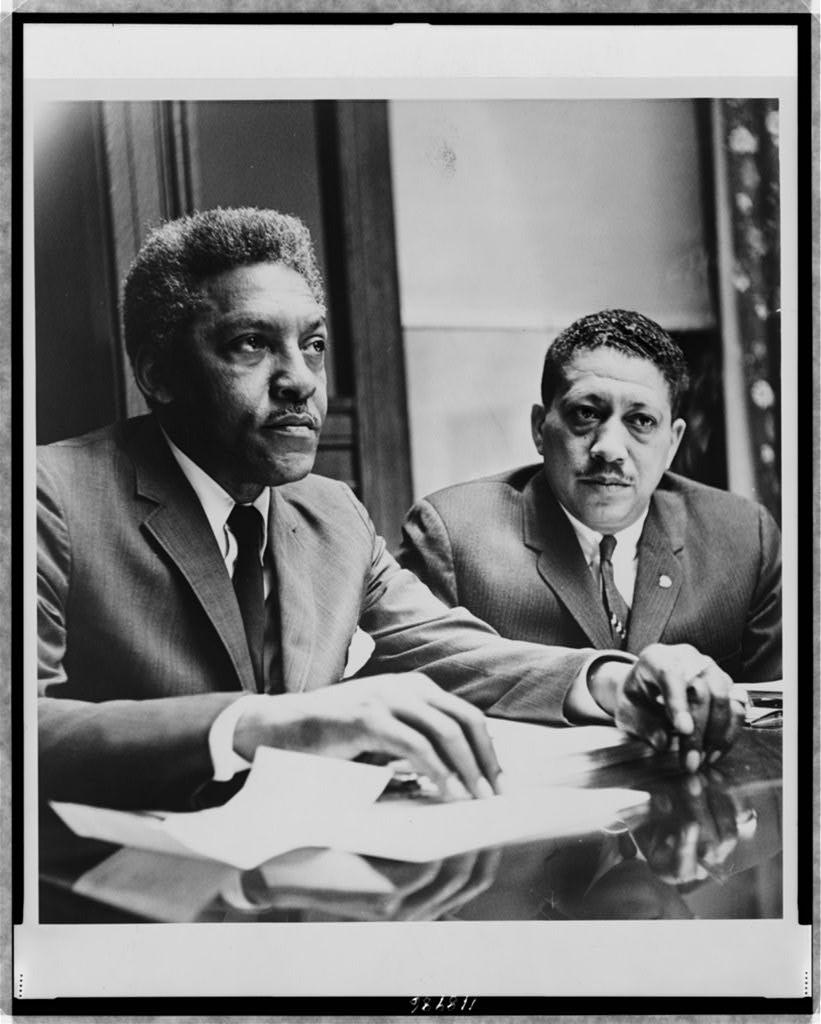
Bayard Rustin (left) and Eugene Reed (right), seated behind table

Eugene Tyree Reed (January 9, 1923 – September 25, 2002) was an American dentist and civil rights leader. He was twice president of the New York state conference of the National Association for the Advancement of Colored People (NAACP).

Reed campaigned for civil rights in the North and the South during the 1950s and 1960s. He was a Freedom Rider and a principal organizer of school desegregation protests in New York. He was also an advocate of more militant strategies within the NAACP.

== Early life, education and career ==
Reed was born on January 9, 1923, in the Bedford–Stuyvesant neighbourhood of New York. He was the son of dentist, Albert Edward Reed, and teacher, Dorothy Tyree Reed.

In 1930, his family moved to Glen Cove, Long Island. Reed's mother still had to commute to work in New York City since Long Island public schools didn't hire black teachers. Reed attended St. Dominic’s High School and later studied dentistry at Howard University. In 1944, he married Jane Dwin.

Reed graduated from Howard in 1946 with a doctorate of dental surgery (DDS). He enlisted in the United States Army in 1948. While serving in Germany, Reed protested segregation in Army dental clinics. Reed was discharged in 1951, having reached the rank of captain.

In 1951, he established a dental practice in Amityville, New York.

== Civil rights activism ==
Reed became active in the civil rights movement after the murder of an activist, Harry Tyson Moore, in Florida on 25 December 1951. He joined the Amityville branch of the NAACP and soon became branch president in 1953.

From 1958 to 1959, he was vice president of the New York state conference of the NAACP and, from 1961 to 1964, he served as president of the state conference, increasing membership from 20,000 to over 50,000 members. In 1962, Reed became a member of the organisation's national board of directors. Reed was president of the state conference again in 1966 to 1967 and from 1972 to 1974.

Reed was an active organizer of boycotts, picketing, and sit-ins, in particular protesting de facto segregation in New York City schools, lack of diversity on Long Island school boards, discrimination in housing, and electoral discrimination. Reed signed up to became a Freedom Rider, participating in direct-action to integrate hotels and lunch counters.

In a protest in Malverne, New York in 1963, he was thrown to the ground. After another protest in Babylon, he was arrested and jailed. Reed was part of the NAACP committee that investigated the murders of civil rights workers James Chaney, Andrew Goodman, and Michael Schwerner in Mississippi during the Freedom Summer of 1964. Reed was remembered for his calm during the investigation, while frequently surrounded by men carrying shotguns. Reed had crosses burned outside his dental office. A declassified CIA document revealed that he was amongst the prominent civil rights figures being monitored by the government.

In the late 1960s, Reed was part of the NAACP's self-described "Young Turks" who pushed for more confrontational tactics and criticized the organization's cautious approach particularly to high-profile controversies. After one confrontation with the organisation's moderates, Reed resigned in 1968. He would return and serve another term as president of the New York state conference of the NAACP.

In his later years, Reed served in a number of government advisory roles, including as a special consultant on civil rights to a committee advising New York Governor Nelson A. Rockefeller, although this didn't stop him publicly criticizing the government. Reed also acted as an affirmative action consultant to the Babylon town supervisor, frequently advocating for electoral reform and increased minority representation.

== Awards and honours ==
The Eugene T. Reed Award was established about 1962 and is awarded annually by the New York state NAACP to an outstanding member of the association.

== Death and legacy ==
Eugene Reed died on September 25, 2002, at his home in Amityville, New York. He was survived by his wife, Jane, and their three children. Reed was interred at Calverton National Cemetery.
