= Edward Clarke Smith =

American politician (1864–1926)

33rd Mayor of Manchester, New Hampshire
- In office 1911–1912
- Preceded by: Eugene Elliott Reed
- Succeeded by: Charles C. Hayes

Personal details
- Born: October 24, 1864 Manchester, New Hampshire
- Died: August 25, 1926 (aged 61) Manchester, New Hampshire
- Party: Republican
- Spouse: Anna M. Spencer (m. 1891)
- Relations: Isaac W. Smith; Hiram Brown
- Profession: Pharmacist; Politician

Edward Clarke Smith (October 24, 1864 – August 25, 1926) was a pharmacist and Republican politician in the U.S. State of New Hampshire. He served as the mayor of Manchester, New Hampshire, in 1911 and 1912.

== Early life and career ==
Smith was born in Manchester, New Hampshire, the son of former Mayor Isaac W. Smith and Amanda (Brown) Smith. Smith's father served as mayor of Manchester in 1869. His mother was the daughter of former Mayor Hiram Brown, the first mayor of Manchester, who served from 1846 to 1847.

He is, to date, the only mayor of Manchester to have been descended from two others who have held the position. A newspaper account at the time of his death speculated that a grandfather-father-son succession had likely never occurred in an American city before.

Smith attended local schools, graduating from Manchester High School in 1884. Following graduation, he began working in the drug store business as a clerk. He was awarded a pharmacist certificate from the state licensing board on April 24, 1889. He opened his own drug store is 1890 and owned the store until 1897, when he went into partnership with another drug store owner.

== Political career ==
His political involvement began in 1895 when he was elected selectman from Ward 3 as a Republican. In 1897, he was elected city clerk for Manchester and was re-elected to the position in 1898 and 1899. In 1903, he was elected president and treasurer of the newly formed Uncanoonuc Incline Railroad and Development Company. In 1910, he was elected to a two-year term as mayor of Manchester, serving from 1911 to 1912.

Smith served as Secretary to Mayor Arthur E. Moreau in 1926. He died on August 25, 1926, in Manchester.

== Personal life ==
Smith married Anna M. Spencer on April 14, 1891.

He was the son of former Manchester mayor Isaac W. Smith and the grandson of former Manchester mayor Hiram Brown.

== See also ==
- List of mayors of Manchester, New Hampshire
