= John C. Mongan =

American politician (1925–2013)

42nd & 44th Mayor of Manchester, New Hampshire
- In office 1968–1969
- Preceded by: Roland S. Vallee
- Succeeded by: Henry J. Pariseau
- In office 1962–1963
- Preceded by: Josephat T. Benoit
- Succeeded by: Roland S. Vallee

Personal details
- Born: April 17, 1925 Manchester, New Hampshire, U.S.
- Died: June 20, 2013 (aged 88) Manchester, New Hampshire, U.S.
- Party: Republican
- Spouse: Mary
- Education: Boston University, Northeastern University

John C. Mongan (April 17, 1925 – June 20, 2013) was an American politician who was the mayor of Manchester, New Hampshire from 1962 until 1963, and again from 1968 until 1969. He was a Republican.

== Early life and career ==
Mongan was born in Manchester, New Hampshire, to John and Anne (Frain) Mongan on April 17, 1925. In his youth, he attended Manchester's Main Street School, where he could view strikes taking place at the Amoskeag Manufacturing Company during the Great Depression.

He received a Bachelor of Science from Boston University in 1950. He went on to achieve a Master of Public Administration from Northeastern University. He died at age 89 in Manchester City.
