= List of mayors of Manchester, New Hampshire =

This is a list of mayors of Manchester, New Hampshire.

Political party designations are shown for some mayors, where known. However, municipal elections are officially non-partisan.

Throughout most of the previous century, elections have been held in odd-numbered years. Mayors are elected for a two-year term of office. The first city election in Manchester, New Hampshire occurred on August 19, 1846.

The administrative and executive powers of the city are vested in the mayor. The mayor must be a resident of the city for at least a year prior to filing for the office of mayor. The mayor has the power to supervise the administrative affairs of the city and presides over meetings of the Board of Mayor and Aldermen. The mayor is the de facto head of the Board of School Committee, which oversees the city’s schools.

From 1846 to 1857, mayors served for a one-year term, expiring on the third Tuesday in March. From 1857 to 1872, the mayor's term expired on the last day of December. In 1873, the term ended annually on the Third Tuesday in March, up until 1880, when it became a two-year term.

== List ==
No.	Mayor	Took office	Left office	Tenure	Party	Election
1	Hiram Brown (1801–1890)	1846	1847	1 year	Whig	1846
2	Jacob F. James (1817–1892); 1st time	1847	1849	2 years	Whig	1847
2	Jacob F. James (1817–1892); 1st time	1847	1849	2 years	Whig	1848
3	Warren L. Lane (1805–1861)	1849	1850	1 year	Democratic	1849
4	Moses Fellows (1803–1879)	1850	1852	2 years	Unknown	1850
4	Moses Fellows (1803–1879)	1850	1852	2 years	Unknown	1851
5	Frederick Smyth (1819–1899); 1st time	1852	1855	3 years	Unknown	1852
5	Frederick Smyth (1819–1899); 1st time	1852	1855	3 years	Unknown	1853
5	Frederick Smyth (1819–1899); 1st time	1852	1855	3 years	Unknown	1854
6	Theodore T. Abbott (1799–1886); 1st time	1855	1857	2 years	American	1855
6	Theodore T. Abbott (1799–1886); 1st time	1855	1857	2 years	American	Mar. 1856
7	Jacob F. James (1817–1892); 2nd time	1857	1858	1 year	Whig	Nov. 1856
8	Alonzo Smith (1808–1865)	1858	1859	1 year	Unknown	1857
9	Edward W. Harrington (TBA–TBA)	1859	1861	2 years	Unknown	1858
9	Edward W. Harrington (TBA–TBA)	1859	1861	2 years	Unknown	1859
10	David A. Bunton (1805–1890)	1861	1863	2 years	Republican	1860
10	David A. Bunton (1805–1890)	1861	1863	2 years	Republican	1861
11	Theodore T. Abbott (1799–1886); 2nd time	1863	1864	1 year	American	1862
12	Frederick Smyth (1819–1899); 2nd time	1864	1865	1 year	Republican	1863
13	Darwin J. Daniels (?–1865)	1865	August 15, 1865 (Note: Died in office.)	8 months	Unknown	1864
–	F. W. Harrington (TBA–TBA); Acting	August 15, 1865	August 1865	1 month	Unknown	–
14	John Hosley (TBA–TBA); 1st time	August 1865	1867	1 year, 4 months	Unknown	1865
15	Joseph B. Clark (TBA–TBA)	1867	1868	1 year	Republican	1866
16	James A. Weston (1827–1895); 1st time	1868	1869	1 year	Democratic	1867
17	Isaac W. Smith (1825–1898)	1869	1870	1 year	Republican	1868
18	James A. Weston (1827–1895); 2nd time	1870	1871 (Note: Weston resigned after running successfully for Governor of New Hampshire.)	1 year	Democratic	1869
18	James A. Weston (1827–1895); 2nd time	1870	1871	1 year	Democratic	1870
19	Person Colby Cheney (1828–1901)	1872	1873	1 year	Republican	1871
20	Charles H. Bartlett (1833–1900)	1873	February 18, 1873 (Note: Bartlett resigned because he was Clerk of the U.S. District Court, and could not hold a state or municipal elected office.)	2 months	Unknown	1872
21	John P. Newell (TBA–TBA)	1873	1874	10 months	Unknown	App.
22	James A. Weston (1827–1895); 3rd time	1874	1875	1 year	Democratic	1873
23	Alpheus Gay (TBA–TBA)	1875	1876	1 year	Republican	1875
24	Ira Cross (1833–1914)	1876	1877 (Note: Resigned.)	1 year	Republican	1876
24	Ira Cross (1833–1914)	1876	1877	1 year	Republican	1877
25	John L. Kelly (TBA–TBA)	1877	1881	4 years	Unknown	Mar. 1878
25	John L. Kelly (TBA–TBA)	1877	1881	4 years	Unknown	Nov. 1878
26	Horace B. Putnam (1825–1888)	1881	1885	4 years	Unknown	1880
26	Horace B. Putnam (1825–1888)	1881	1885	4 years	Unknown	1882
27	George H. Stearns (1838–1929)	1885	1887	2 years	Unknown	1884
28	John Hosley (TBA–TBA); 2nd time	1887	1889	2 years	Unknown	1886
29	David B. Varney (TBA–TBA)	1889	1891	2 years	Unknown	1888
30	Edgar J. Knowlton (TBA–TBA)	1891	May 10, 1894	3–4 years	Unknown	1890
30	Edgar J. Knowlton (TBA–TBA)	1891	May 10, 1894	3–4 years	Unknown	1892
–	David B. Varney (TBA–TBA); De facto	July 1894	June 1895	11 months	Unknown	–
31	William C. Clarke (TBA–TBA)	1895	1903	8 years	Republican	1894
31	William C. Clarke (TBA–TBA)	1895	1903	8 years	Republican	1896
31	William C. Clarke (TBA–TBA)	1895	1903	8 years	Republican	1898
31	William C. Clarke (TBA–TBA)	1895	1903	8 years	Republican	1900
32	Eugene E. Reed (1866–1940)	1903	1911	8 years	Democratic	1902
32	Eugene E. Reed (1866–1940)	1903	1911	8 years	Democratic	1904
32	Eugene E. Reed (1866–1940)	1903	1911	8 years	Democratic	1906
32	Eugene E. Reed (1866–1940)	1903	1911	8 years	Democratic	1908
33	Edward Clarke Smith (1864–1926)	1911	1913	2 years	Republican	1910
34	Charles C. Hayes (TBA–TBA)	1913	1915	2 years	Democratic	1912
35	Harry W. Spaulding (TBA–TBA)	1915	1918	3 years	Republican	1914
35	Harry W. Spaulding (TBA–TBA)	1915	1918	3 years	Republican	1915
36	Moise Verrette (TBA–TBA)	1918	1922	4 years	Democratic	1917
36	Moise Verrette (TBA–TBA)	1918	1922	4 years	Democratic	1919
37	George E. Trudel (TBA–TBA)	1922	1926	4 years	Republican	1921
37	George E. Trudel (TBA–TBA)	1922	1926	4 years	Republican	1923
38	Arthur E. Moreau (TBA–TBA)	1926	1932	6 years	Republican	1925
38	Arthur E. Moreau (TBA–TBA)	1926	1932	6 years	Republican	1927
38	Arthur E. Moreau (TBA–TBA)	1926	1932	6 years	Republican	1929
39	Damase Caron (TBA–TBA)	1932	1942	10 years	Democratic	1931
39	Damase Caron (TBA–TBA)	1932	1942	10 years	Democratic	1933
39	Damase Caron (TBA–TBA)	1932	1942	10 years	Democratic	1935
39	Damase Caron (TBA–TBA)	1932	1942	10 years	Democratic	1937
39	Damase Caron (TBA–TBA)	1932	1942	10 years	Democratic	1939
40	Wilfred A. LaFlamme (TBA–TBA)	1942	1944	2 years	Republican	1941
41	Josephat T. Benoit (1900–1976)	1944	1962	18 years	Democratic	1943
41	Josephat T. Benoit (1900–1976)	1944	1962	18 years	Democratic	1945
41	Josephat T. Benoit (1900–1976)	1944	1962	18 years	Democratic	1947
41	Josephat T. Benoit (1900–1976)	1944	1962	18 years	Democratic	1949
41	Josephat T. Benoit (1900–1976)	1944	1962	18 years	Democratic	1951
41	Josephat T. Benoit (1900–1976)	1944	1962	18 years	Democratic	1953
41	Josephat T. Benoit (1900–1976)	1944	1962	18 years	Democratic	1955
41	Josephat T. Benoit (1900–1976)	1944	1962	18 years	Democratic	1957
41	Josephat T. Benoit (1900–1976)	1944	1962	18 years	Democratic	1959
42	John C. Mongan (1925–2013); 1st time	1962	1964	2 years	Republican	1961
43	Roland S. Vallee (1929–1997)	1964	1968	4 years	Democratic	1963
43	Roland S. Vallee (1929–1997)	1964	1968	4 years	Democratic	1965
44	John C. Mongan (1925–2013); 2nd time	1968	1970	2 years	Republican	1967
45	Henry J. Pariseau (1918–1970)	1970	May 30, 1970	5 months	Republican	1969
46	Charles R. Stanton (1929–1985); 1st time	1970	1972	1 year, 6 months	Democratic	App.
47	Sylvio L. Dupuis (born 1934)	1972	May 1975 (Note: Dupuis resigned to be one of the founders of Catholic Medical Center.)	3 years, 5 months	Democratic	1971
47	Sylvio L. Dupuis (born 1934)	1972	May 1975	3 years, 5 months	Democratic	1973
48	Charles R. Stanton (1929–1985); 2nd time	May 1975	1982	6 years, 7 months	Democratic	App.
48	Charles R. Stanton (1929–1985); 2nd time	May 1975	1982	6 years, 7 months	Democratic	1975
48	Charles R. Stanton (1929–1985); 2nd time	May 1975	1982	6 years, 7 months	Democratic	1977
48	Charles R. Stanton (1929–1985); 2nd time	May 1975	1982	6 years, 7 months	Democratic	1979
49	Emile Beaulieu (1931–2016); 1st time	1982	1984	2 years	Democratic	1981
50	Robert F. Shaw (1934–2004)	1984	1988	4 years	Republican	1983
50	Robert F. Shaw (1934–2004)	1984	1988	4 years	Republican	1985
51	Emile Beaulieu (1931–2016); 2nd time	1988	1990	2 years	Democratic	1987
52	Raymond Wieczorek (1928–2022)	1990	2000	10 years	Republican	1989
52	Raymond Wieczorek (1928–2022)	1990	2000	10 years	Republican	1991
52	Raymond Wieczorek (1928–2022)	1990	2000	10 years	Republican	1993
52	Raymond Wieczorek (1928–2022)	1990	2000	10 years	Republican	1995
52	Raymond Wieczorek (1928–2022)	1990	2000	10 years	Republican	1997
53	Robert A. Baines (1946–2026)	2000	2006	6 years	Democratic	1999
53	Robert A. Baines (1946–2026)	2000	2006	6 years	Democratic	2001
53	Robert A. Baines (1946–2026)	2000	2006	6 years	Democratic	2003
54	Frank Guinta (born 1970)	January 3, 2006	January 5, 2010	4 years, 2 days	Republican	2005
54	Frank Guinta (born 1970)	January 3, 2006	January 5, 2010	4 years, 2 days	Republican	2007
55	Ted Gatsas (born 1950)	January 5, 2010	January 2, 2018	7 years, 362 days	Republican	2009
55	Ted Gatsas (born 1950)	January 5, 2010	January 2, 2018	7 years, 362 days	Republican	2011
55	Ted Gatsas (born 1950)	January 5, 2010	January 2, 2018	7 years, 362 days	Republican	2013
55	Ted Gatsas (born 1950)	January 5, 2010	January 2, 2018	7 years, 362 days	Republican	2015
56	Joyce Craig (born 1967)	January 2, 2018	January 2, 2024	6 years, 0 days	Democratic	2017
56	Joyce Craig (born 1967)	January 2, 2018	January 2, 2024	6 years, 0 days	Democratic	2019
56	Joyce Craig (born 1967)	January 2, 2018	January 2, 2024	6 years, 0 days	Democratic	2021
57	Jay Ruais (born 1985)	January 2, 2024	Incumbent	2 years, 302 days	Republican	2023
57	Jay Ruais (born 1985)	January 2, 2024	Incumbent	2 years, 302 days	Republican	2025

== See also ==
- Mayoral elections in Manchester, New Hampshire
