= Mayoral elections in Manchester, New Hampshire, in the 21st century =

Beginning shortly after the city's incorporation as a city in 1846, elections have been held in the mayor of Manchester, New Hampshire. The following article provides information on the elections for mayor in the city during the 21st century.

== Election laws and history ==
The city of Manchester, New Hampshire, held its first mayoral election in 1846.

The city's mayoral elections are currently are nonpartisan, a change which was adopted before the 1997 election. While, prior to 1997, elections had long been partisan, there had been stretches previous to 1999 in which the city's mayoral elections had been nonpartisan, including the stretch of four elections held from 1953 through 1959.

Under current election laws, to be eligible to be elected mayor, one must be a resident of the city for at least one year prior to filing for the office of mayor.

Elections throughout the 20th century have been for two-years terms, as has been the case in the city since the 1880 election.

There are no term limits.

== 2001 ==
2001 Manchester, New Hampshire, mayoral election
- November 6, 2001

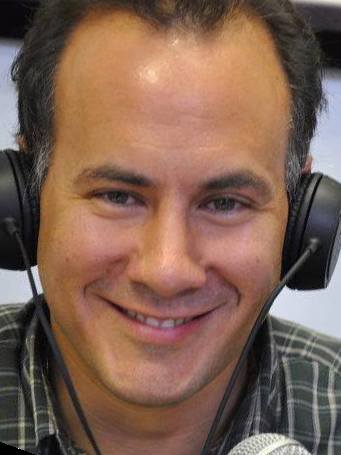
| Nominee | Robert A. Baines | Richard Girard |
| Party | Nonpartisan | Nonpartisan |
| Popular vote | 12,321 | 9,187 |
| Percentage | 57.29% | 42.71% |
Mayor before election
Robert A. Baines
Democratic
Elected mayor
Robert A. Baines
Democratic

The 2001 Manchester, New Hampshire, mayoral election was held on November 6, 2001, to elect the mayor of Manchester, New Hampshire. It saw the reelection of Robert A. Baines.

The election was formally nonpartisan.

Before the general election, a nonpartisan primary election was held on September 18, 2001, to determine the two candidates who would appear on the general election ballot. The general and primary elections both coincided with those for the Manchester Board of Aldermen and welfare commissioner. The general election also coincided with a school board election and two ballot questions.

=== Candidates ===
- Robert A. Baines, incumbent mayor since 2000
- Richard Girard, alderman since 1998
- Joseph Kelly Levasseur

=== Results ===
Primary election

2001 Manchester, New Hampshire, mayoral primary election
| Candidate | Votes | % |
|---|---|---|
| Robert A. Baines (incumbent) | 8,032 | 50.84 |
| Richard H. Girard | 4,817 | 30.49 |
| Joseph Kelly Levasseur | 2,950 | 18.67 |
| Total votes | 15,799 | 100 |

General election

2001 Manchester, New Hampshire, mayoral election
| Candidate | Votes | % |
|---|---|---|
| Robert A. Baines (incumbent) | 12,321 | 57.29 |
| Richard H. Girard | 9,187 | 42.71 |
| Total votes | 21,508 | 100 |

== 2003 ==
2003 Manchester, New Hampshire, mayoral election
- November 4, 2003
| Nominee | Robert A. Baines | Carlos Gonzalez |
| Party | Nonpartisan | Nonpartisan |
| Popular vote | 11,742 | 5,106 |
| Percentage | 69.69% | 30.31% |
Mayor before election
Robert A. Baines
Democratic
Elected mayor
Robert A. Baines
Democratic

The 2003 Manchester, New Hampshire, mayoral election was held on November 4, 2003, to elect the mayor of Manchester, New Hampshire. It saw the reelection of Robert A. Baines to a third consecutive term.

The election was formally nonpartisan. The election coincided with that for the Manchester Board of Aldermen. Before the general election, a nonpartisan primary election was held on September 16, 2003, to determine the two candidates who would appear on the general election ballot.

=== Candidates ===
- Robert A. Baines, incumbent mayor since 2000
- Jane Beaulieu
- Carlos Gonzalez
- Robert A. Howe
- Jeff Kassel
- Robert F. Shaw, former mayor (1984–1987), candidate for the Republican nomination in the 1988 New Hampshire gubernatorial election, Democratic nominee in the 1995 mayoral election, candidate in the 1997 mayoral election
- "D.R." Soucy

While the election was formally nonpartisan, some candidates had publicly-known political affiliations. Baines and Shaw were both Democrats. Carlos Gonzalez was a Republican.

Gonzalez was the first Hispanic mayoral candidate in the city's history.

=== Results ===
Primary election

2003 Manchester, New Hampshire, mayoral primary election
| Candidate | Votes | % |
|---|---|---|
| Robert A. Baines (incumbent) | 4,557 | 43.35 |
| Carlos Gonzalez | 2,230 | 21.21 |
| Jane Ellen Beaulieu | 1,780 | 16.93 |
| Robert "Bob" Shaw | 1,583 | 15.06 |
| "Jeff" Kassel | 168 | 1.60 |
| "D.R." Soucy | 99 | 0.94 |
| Robert A. Howe | 96 | 0.91 |
| Total votes | 10,513 | 100 |

General election

2003 Manchester, New Hampshire, mayoral election
| Candidate | Votes | % |
|---|---|---|
| Robert A. Baines (incumbent) | 11,742 | 69.69 |
| Carlos Gonzalez | 5,106 | 30.31 |
| Bob Shaw (write-in) | 745 | 4.42 |
| Total votes | 16,848 | 100 |

== 2005 ==
2005 Manchester, New Hampshire, mayoral election
- November 8, 2005
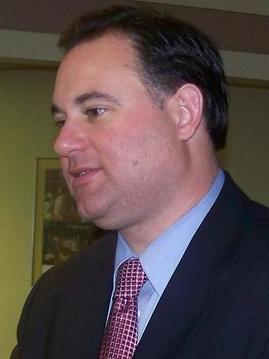

| Nominee | Frank Guinta | Robert A. Baines |
| Party | Nonpartisan | Nonpartisan |
| Popular vote | 10,125 | 9,597 |
| Percentage | 51.34% | 48.66% |
Mayor before election
Robert A. Baines
Democratic
Elected mayor
Frank Guinta
Republican

The 2005 Manchester, New Hampshire, mayoral election was held on November 8, 2005, to elect the mayor of Manchester, New Hampshire. It saw Frank Guinta unseat the incumbent mayor Robert A. Baines. The election was formally nonpartisan.

Before the general election, a nonpartisan primary election was held on September 20, 2005, to determine the two candidates who would appear on the general election ballot. The general and primary elections both coincided with those for the Manchester Board of Aldermen.

=== Candidates ===
- Robert A. Baines, incumbent mayor since 2000
- Frank Guinta, alderman since 2002
- Jeff Kassel

=== Results ===
Primary election

2005 Manchester, New Hampshire, mayoral primary election
| Candidate | Votes | % |
|---|---|---|
| Robert A. Baines (incumbent) | 5,168 | 53.95 |
| Frank Guinta | 3,760 | 39.25 |
| "Jeff" Kassel | 651 | 5.86 |
| Total votes | 9,579 | 100 |

General election

2005 Manchester, New Hampshire, mayoral election
| Candidate | Votes | % |
|---|---|---|
| Frank C. Guinta | 10,125 | 51.34 |
| Robert A. Baines (incumbent) | 9,597 | 48.66 |
| Total votes | 19,622 | 100 |

== 2007 ==
2007 Manchester, New Hampshire, mayoral election
- November 6, 2007
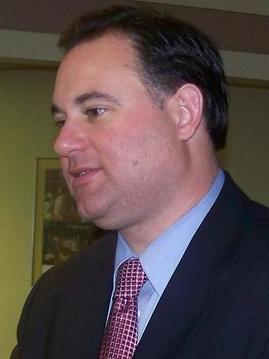

| Nominee | Frank Guinta | Tom Donovan |
| Party | Nonpartisan | Nonpartisan |
| Popular vote | 10,381 | 8,894 |
| Percentage | 53.86% | 46.14% |
Mayor before election
Frank Guinta
Republican
Elected mayor
Frank Guinta
Republican

The 2007 Manchester, New Hampshire, mayoral election was held on November 6, 2007, to elect the mayor of Manchester, New Hampshire. It saw incumbent mayor Frank Guinta win reelection.

The election was formally nonpartisan.

Before the general election, a nonpartisan primary election was held on September 18, 2007, to determine the two candidates who would appear on the general election ballot. The general and primary elections both coincided with those for the Manchester Board of Aldermen.

=== Candidates ===
- Jane Beaulieu, member of the New Hampshire House of Representatives since 2007 and candidate for mayor in 2003
- Caitlin Curran
- Tom Donovan, former chair of the Manchester School Board Finance Committee
- Katherine Gatsas
- Frank Guinta, incumbent mayor since 2006
- Joseph Kelly Levasseur

=== Campaign ===
Shortly after announcing his candidacy, Donovan received the endorsement of Chris Dodd, United States senator from Connecticut and candidate for the Democratic presidential nomination.

In the general election, Donovan was elected by Teamsters Local 633.

=== Results ===
Primary election

2007 Manchester, New Hampshire, mayoral primary election
| Candidate | Votes | % |
|---|---|---|
| Frank C. Guinta (incumbent) | 5,219 | 44.78 |
| Thomas "Tom" Donovan | 3,797 | 32.58 |
| Joseph Kelly Levasseur | 1,151 | 9.88 |
| Jane E. Beaulieu | 1,096 | 9.41 |
| Ketherine Gatsas | 311 | 2.67 |
| Caitlin Curran | 81 | 0.70 |
| Total votes | 11,655 | 100 |

General election

2007 Manchester, New Hampshire, mayoral election
| Candidate | Votes | % |
|---|---|---|
| Frank C. Guinta (incumbent) | 10,381 | 53.86 |
| Thomas "Tom" Donovan | 8,894 | 46.14 |
| Total votes | 19,275 | 100 |

== 2009 ==
2009 Manchester, New Hampshire, mayoral election
- November 3, 2009
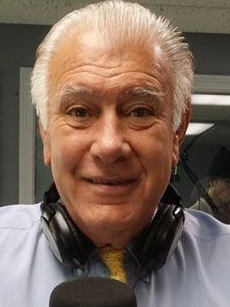

| Nominee | Ted Gatsas | Mark Roy |
| Party | Nonpartisan | Nonpartisan |
| Popular vote | 10,668 | 8,144 |
| Percentage | 56.74% | 43.30% |
Mayor before election
Frank Guinta
Republican
Elected mayor
Ted Gatsas
Republican

The 2009 Manchester, New Hampshire, mayoral election was held on November 3, 2009, to elect the mayor of Manchester, New Hampshire. Alderman and State Senator Ted Gatsas defeated Alderman Mark Roy by a margin of 56% to 43% in the November 3 general election.

Before the general election, a nonpartisan primary election was held on September 15, 2009, to determine the two candidates that would appear on the general election ballot. The primary and general elections both coincided with those for the Manchester Board of Aldermen.

=== Background ===
Manchester's mayoral elections are non-partisan, occur every two years, and there are no term limits. The incumbent mayor, Frank Guinta, had served since 2006. Guinta stated in the spring of 2009 that he would not run for reelection and subsequently announced that he would run to represent New Hampshire's 1st congressional district in the United States House of Representatives in 2010 challenging incumbent Carol Shea-Porter.

=== Candidates ===
Ran

- Ted Gatsas, Alderman and State Senator
- Richard Komi, State Representative
- Glenn Ouellette, Public-access television producer
- Mark Roy, Alderman for Ward 1
- Bobby Stephen, former State Senator

Declined

- Tom Donovan, 2007 mayoral candidate and former school board member (endorsed Mark Roy)
- Michael Lopez, Alderman At-Large

=== Results ===
Primary election

2009 Manchester, New Hampshire, mayoral primary election
| Candidate | Votes | % |
|---|---|---|
| Ted Gatsas | 5,387 | 46.09 |
| Mark E. Roy | 3,364 | 27.78 |
| Bobby Stephen | 2,545 | 21.77 |
| Glenn Ouellette | 201 | 1.72 |
| Richard N. Komi | 191 | 1.63 |
| Total votes | 11,688 | 100 |

General election

2009 Manchester, New Hampshire, mayoral election
| Candidate | Votes | % |
|---|---|---|
| Ted Gatsas | 10,668 | 56.74 |
| Mark E. Roy | 8,135 | 43.26 |
| Total votes | 18,803 | 100 |

== 2011 ==
2011 Manchester, New Hampshire, mayoral election
- November 8, 2011
- Turnout: 27.20%
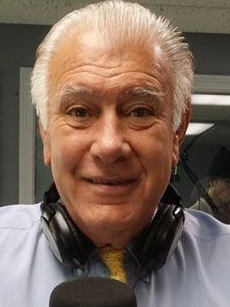

| Nominee | Ted Gatsas | Chris Herbert |
| Party | Nonpartisan | Nonpartisan |
| Popular vote | 10,204 | 4,086 |
| Percentage | 69.77% | 27.94% |
Mayor before election
Ted Gatsas
Republican
Elected mayor
Ted Gatsas
Republican

The 2011 Manchester, New Hampshire, mayoral election was held on November 8, 2011, to elect the mayor of Manchester, New Hampshire. It saw incumbent mayor Ted Gatsas win reelection. The election coincided with those for the Manchester Board of Aldermen.

=== Candidates ===
- Ted Gatsas, incumbent mayor since 2010
- Chris Herbert, ward 4 representative to the Manchester Board of School Committee and 1999 candidate in the Democratic primary for New Hampshire State Senate district 20

=== Results ===
2011 Manchester, New Hampshire, mayoral election
| Candidate | Votes | % |
|---|---|---|
| Ted Gatsas (incumbent) | 10,204 | 69.77 |
| Chris Herbert | 4,086 | 27.94 |
| Total votes | 14,290 | 100 |
| Turnout | {{{votes}}} | 27.20% |

== 2013 ==
2013 Manchester, New Hampshire, mayoral election
- November 5, 2013
- Turnout: 25.26%
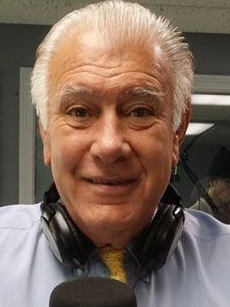

| Nominee | Ted Gatsas | Patrick Arnold |
| Party | Nonpartisan | Nonpartisan |
| Popular vote | 8,106 | 7,163 |
| Percentage | 52.46% | 46.36% |
- General election results by ward Gatsas: 50–60% Arnold: 50–60%
Mayor before election
Ted Gatsas
Republican
Elected mayor
Ted Gatsas
Republican

The 2013 Manchester, New Hampshire, mayoral election was held on November 5, 2003, to elect the mayor of Manchester, New Hampshire. Incumbent mayor Ted Gatsas won reelection to a third consecutive term. He defeated city alderman Patrick Arnold. While the election was formally nonpartisan, Arnold was a known Democrat and Gatsas was a known Republican.

Before the general election, a nonpartisan primary election was held on September 17, 2013, to determine the two candidates that would appear on the general election ballot. The primary and general elections both coincided with those for the Manchester Board of Aldermen.

=== Candidates ===
- Patrick Arnold, alderman since 2009
- Ted Gatsas, incumbent mayor since 2010
- Glenn Ouellette, perennial candidate

=== Results ===
Primary election

2013 Manchester, New Hampshire, mayoral primary election
| Candidate | Votes | % |
|---|---|---|
| Ted Gatsas (incumbent) | 4,005 | 55.03 |
| Patrick Arnold | 2,922 | 40.15 |
| Glenn Ouellette | 246 | 3.38 |
| Write-ins | 95 | 1.31 |
| Total votes | 7,278 | 100 |
| Turnout | {{{votes}}} | 11.87% |

General election

2013 Manchester, New Hampshire, mayoral election
| Candidate | Votes | % |
|---|---|---|
| Ted Gatsas (incumbent) | 8,106 | 52.46 |
| Mark E. Roy | 7,163 | 46.36 |
| Write-ins | 41 | 0.27 |
| Total votes | 15,451 | 100 |
| Turnout | {{{votes}}} | 25.26% |

== 2015 ==
2015 Manchester, New Hampshire, mayoral election
- November 3, 2015
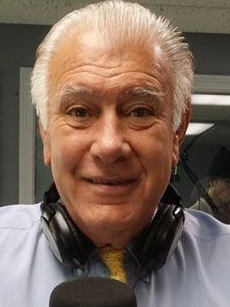

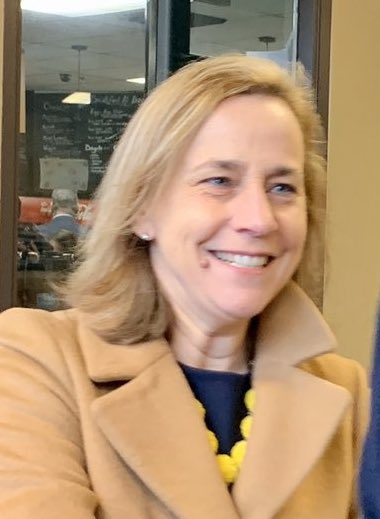
| Candidate | Ted Gatsas | Joyce Craig |
| Party | Nonpartisan | Nonpartisan |
| Popular vote | 10,046 | 9,961 |
| Percentage | 50.10% | 49.67% |
- General election results by ward Gatsas: 50–60% Craig: 50–60%
Mayor before election
Ted Gatsas
Republican
Elected mayor
Ted Gatsas
Republican

The 2015 Manchester, New Hampshire, mayoral election was held on November 3, 2015, to elect the mayor of Manchester, New Hampshire. It saw the reelection of Ted Gatsas, a member of the Republican Party, to his fourth consecutive term. The election was incredibly narrow, with Gatsas winning by a mere 85 votes.

The election was formally nonpartisan.

Prior to the general election, a nonpartisan primary election was held on September 15, 2015, to select the two candidates who appeared on the ballot in the general election.

=== Candidates ===
- Patrick Arnold, former city alderman (2009–2014) and 2013 mayoral candidate
- Joyce Craig, city alderman
- Ted Gatsas, incumbent mayor
- Glenn Ouellette, perennial candidate
- Alibaba Shaikh

While the election was formally nonpartisan, numerous candidates had publicly-known political affiliations. For instance, Arnold was a known Democrat and Gatsas was a known Republican.

=== Results ===
Primary election

2015 Manchester, New Hampshire, mayoral primary election
| Candidate | Votes | % |
|---|---|---|
| Ted Gatsas (incumbent) | 5,188 | 42.50 |
| Joyce Craig | 4,557 | 37.33 |
| Patrick Arnold | 1,861 | 15.24 |
| Alibaba Shaikh | 461 | 3.78 |
| Glenn Ouellette | 117 | 0.96 |
| Write-ins | 24 | 0.20 |
| Total votes | 12,208 | 100 |

General election
The original unofficial count saw Gatsas leading by a 75-vote margin. After a recount, Gatsas was found to have indeed won the election.

2015 Manchester, New Hampshire, mayoral election
| Candidate | Votes | % |
|---|---|---|
| Ted Gatsas (incumbent) | 10,046 | 50.10 |
| Joyce Craig | 9,961 | 49.67 |
| Write-ins | 47 | 0.23 |
| Total votes | 20,054 | 100 |

== 2017 ==
2017 Manchester, New Hampshire, mayoral election
- November 7, 2017
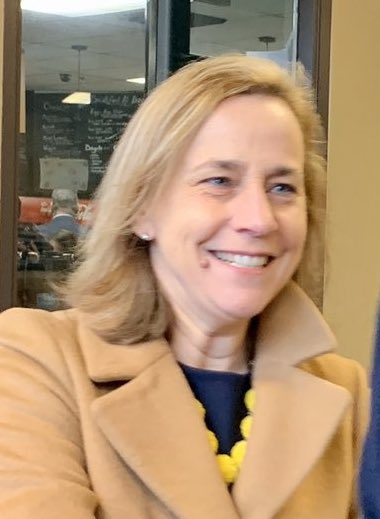

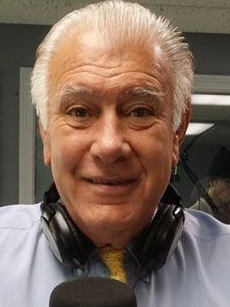
| Candidate | Joyce Craig | Ted Gatsas |
| Party | Nonpartisan | Nonpartisan |
| Popular vote | 12,068 | 10,570 |
| Percentage | 53.21% | 46.60% |
- General election results by ward Craig: 50–60% 60–70% Gatsas: 50–60%
Mayor before election
Ted Gatsas
Republican
Elected mayor
Joyce Craig
Democratic

The 2017 Manchester, New Hampshire, mayoral election was held on November 7, 2017, to elect the mayor of Manchester, New Hampshire. It saw the election of Joyce Craig, a member of the Democratic Party, to her first term, unseating Republican incumbent Ted Gatsas. Craig became the city's first female mayor.

The election was formally nonpartisan.

Prior to the general election, a nonpartisan primary election was held on September 19, 2017, to select the two candidates who appeared on the ballot in the general election.

=== Background ===
Though Manchester's municipal elections are officially nonpartisan, candidates tend to associate themselves with either the Democratic Party or Republican Party. Ted Gatsas, a member of the Republican Party, had been mayor since 2010. Former Manchester alderman Joyce Craig, a member of the Democratic Party, had previously challenged Gatsas in 2015. In the 2016 presidential election, Democratic nominee Hillary Clinton received around 3,000 more votes than Republican nominee Donald Trump in Manchester.

=== Campaign ===
Gatsas announced in June 2017 that he would seek a fifth term. Craig also filed her candidacy in June 2017. Joshua Dallaire and perennial candidate Glenn Ouellette also ran.

Craig and Gatsas placed first and second respectively in the primary election and advanced to the general election.

Craig received support from Democratic politicians including Joe Biden, Eric Garcetti, Martin O'Malley and Tim Ryan.

=== Results ===
Primary election

2017 Manchester, New Hampshire, mayoral primary election
| Candidate | Votes | % |
|---|---|---|
| Joyce Craig | 5,812 | 52.66 |
| Ted Gatsas (incumbent) | 4,997 | 45.27 |
| Glenn Ouellette | 138 | 1.25 |
| Joshua Dallaire | 74 | 0.67 |
| Write-ins | 16 | 0.14 |
| Total votes | 11,037 | 100 |

General election

2017 Manchester, New Hampshire, mayoral election
| Candidate | Votes | % |
|---|---|---|
| Joyce Craig | 12,068 | 53.21 |
| Ted Gatsas (incumbent) | 10,570 | 46.60 |
| Write-ins | 42 | 0.19 |
| Total votes | 22,680 | 100 |

=== Aftermath ===
New Hampshire's U.S. senators Jeanne Shaheen and Maggie Hassan praised Craig's election as Manchester's first female mayor. Craig was sworn in on January 2, 2018. Gatsas was elected to the Executive Council of New Hampshire in 2018 and re-elected in 2020.

== 2019 ==
2019 Manchester, New Hampshire, mayoral election
- November 7, 2019
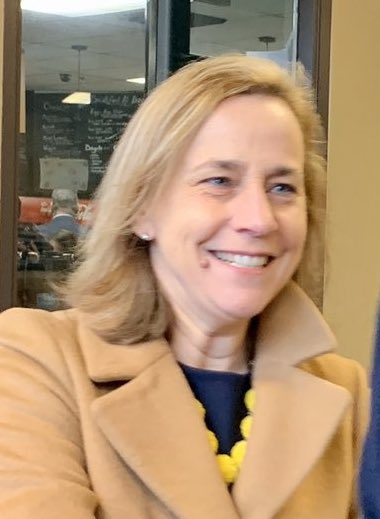

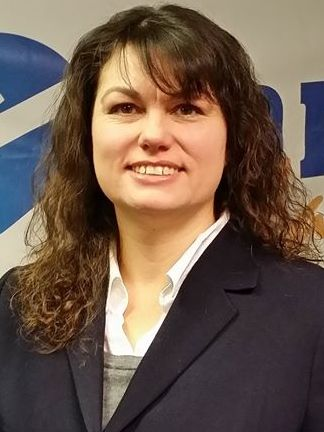
| Candidate | Joyce Craig | Victoria Sullivan |
| Party | Nonpartisan | Nonpartisan |
| Popular vote | 11,003 | 8,436 |
| Percentage | 56.48% | 43.30% |
- General election results by ward Craig: 50–60% 60–70% Sullivan: 50–60%
Mayor before election
Joyce Craig
Democratic
Elected mayor
Joyce Craig
Democratic

The 2019 Manchester, New Hampshire, mayoral election was held on November 7, 2019, to elect the mayor of Manchester, New Hampshire. It saw the reelection of Joyce Craig, a member of the Democratic Party.

Prior to the general election, a nonpartisan primary election was held on September 17, 2019, to select the two candidates to be included on the general election ballot.

=== Background ===
Though Manchester's municipal elections are officially nonpartisan, candidates tend to associate themselves with either the Democratic Party or Republican Party. Victoria Sullivan, a member of the Republican Party, had been a two-term member of the New Hampshire House of Representatives. Incumbent mayor and former Manchester alderman Joyce Craig, a member of the Democratic Party, had previously unsuccessfully challenged former mayor Ted Gatsas in 2015 and won against him in a 2017 rematch. In the 2016 presidential election, Democratic nominee Hillary Clinton received around 3,000 more votes than Republican nominee Donald Trump in Manchester.

=== Campaign ===
Craig announced in April 2019 that she would seek a second term. Sullivan also filed her candidacy in April 2019. Joshua Dallaire and Independent perennial candidate Glenn Ouellette also ran.

Craig and Sullivan placed first and second respectively in the primary election and advanced to the general election.

Craig received support from Democratic politicians including U.S. Representative Chris Pappas, U.S. Senator Jeanne Shaheen, and U.S. Senator Maggie Hassan.

=== Results ===
Primary election

2019 Manchester, New Hampshire, mayoral primary election
| Candidate | Votes | % |
|---|---|---|
| Joyce Craig (incumbent) | 4,996 | 57.07 |
| Victoria Sullivan | 3,418 | 39.04 |
| Glenn Ouellette | 317 | 3.62 |
| Write-ins | 24 | 0.27 |
| Total votes | 8,755 | 100 |

General election

2019 Manchester, New Hampshire, mayoral election
| Candidate | Votes | % |
|---|---|---|
| Joyce Craig (incumbent) | 11,003 | 56.48 |
| Victoria Sullivan | 8,436 | 43.30 |
| Write-ins | 42 | 0.22 |
| Total votes | 19,481 | 100 |

== 2021 ==
2021 Manchester, New Hampshire, mayoral election
- November 2, 2021
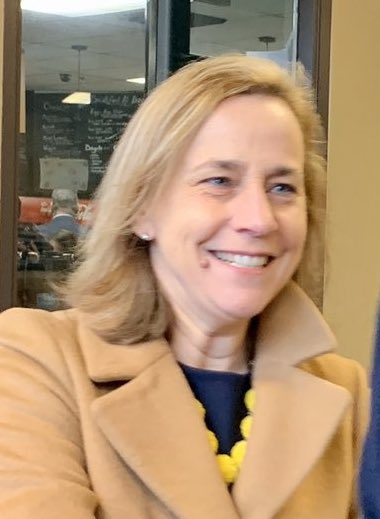

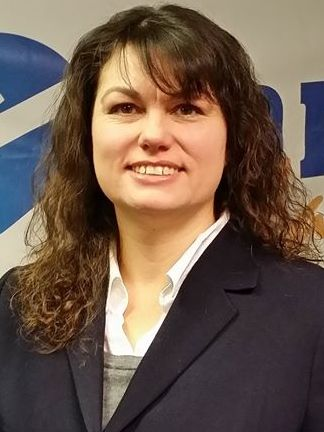
| Candidate | Joyce Craig | Victoria Sullivan |
| Party | Nonpartisan | Nonpartisan |
| Popular vote | 10,247 | 9,016 |
| Percentage | 52.42% | 46.12% |
- General election results by ward Craig: 50–60% 60–70% Sullivan: 40–50% 50–60%
Mayor before election
Joyce Craig
Democratic
Elected mayor
Joyce Craig
Democratic

The 2021 Manchester, New Hampshire, mayoral election was held on November 2, 2021. This election saw incumbent mayor Joyce Craig, a member of the Democratic Party, re-elected to a third term. Members of the Board of Aldermen, Board of School Committee, Ward Moderators, Clerks and Selectmen were also elected on November 2 in coinciding elections.

=== Background ===
Though Manchester's municipal elections are officially nonpartisan, candidates tend to associate themselves with either the Democratic Party or Republican Party. Victoria Sullivan, a member of the Republican Party, had been a two-term member of the New Hampshire House of Representatives and previously ran in the 2019 Manchester, New Hampshire, mayoral election. Richard Girard, a member of the Republican Party, is a former alderman and former at-large representative on the Manchester School District school board who previously ran for mayor in 2001. Incumbent mayor and former Manchester alderman Joyce Craig, a member of the Democratic Party, had previously unseated former mayor Ted Gatsas in a 2017 rematch after to losing to him in 2015. She had won re-election to a second term in the 2019 Manchester, New Hampshire, mayoral election against Victoria Sullivan.

In the 2020 presidential election, the Democratic ticket of Joe Biden and Kamala Harris received 29,464 votes in Manchester, while the Republican ticket of Donald Trump and Mike Pence received 22,127 votes and the Libertarian ticket of Jo Jorgensen and Spike Cohen received 1,015 votes.

=== Candidates ===
==== Declared ====
- Joyce Craig, incumbent mayor
- Richard Girard, radio host, former alderman, former school board member, 2001 mayoral candidate
- Victoria Sullivan, former New Hampshire state representative and 2019 mayoral candidate

==== Declined ====
- Ted Gatsas, New Hampshire Executive councilor and former mayor

=== Campaign ===
Victoria Sullivan announced a run for mayor in April 2021. Craig also announced in April 2021 that she would seek a third term. Richard Girard, who was a former alderman and former at-large representative on the Manchester School District school board, announced he would be running in April 2021 as well.

After the primary, third-place finisher Girard requested a recount.

=== Endorsements ===
Victoria Sullivan (R)

U.S. senators

- Kelly Ayotte, U.S. Senator from New Hampshire (2011–2017)
- Rand Paul, U.S. Senator from Kentucky (2011–present)

Governors

- Chris Sununu, New Hampshire Governor (2017–present)

State legislators

- Jeb Bradley, state senator from the 3rd district and majority leader
- Tom DeBlois, former state senator from the 18th district (2010–2012)
- Larry Gagne, state representative (2008–present)
- Mark McLean, state representative (2017–present)
- Chuck Morse, state senator from 22nd district and Senate President
- Sherman Packard, state representative (1990–present) and Speaker of the House
- Denise Ricciardi, state senator from the 9th district
- Tammy Simmons, former state representative (2014–2016) and chair of Manchester GOP

Local officials

- Keith Hirschmann, Ward 12 Alderman
- Raymond Wieczorek, former Manchester mayor (1990–2000) and District 4 Executive Councilor (2012–present)
Richard Girard (R)

U.S. senators

- Bob Smith, U.S. Senator from New Hampshire (1990–2003)

State senators

- Jim Rubens, state senator from the 5th district (1994–1998)

Other

- Retired U.S. General Don Bolduc
Joyce Craig (D)

Officials

- Carlo Capano, former Manchester Police Department Chief
- Kevin Cavanaugh, Alderman/State Senator (D-Manchester)
- Lou D'Allesandro, State Senator (D-Manchester)
- Syl Dupuis, former Manchester Mayor
- Victor Goulet, former Manchester Republican Chair
- Chris Pappas, U.S. Representative from New Hampshire
- Donna Soucy, New Hampshire Senate Minority Leader (D-Manchester)

Labor unions

- New Hampshire State Employees Association/SEIU Chapter 1984
- Teamsters Local 633

Organizations

- Democracy for America
- EMILY's List
- International Association of Firefighters Local 856
- International Association of Firefighters Local 3820
- Manchester Association of Police Supervisors
- Manchester Education Association
- Manchester Police Patrolmen's Association
- Planned Parenthood

=== Results ===
Primary election

2021 Manchester, New Hampshire, mayoral primary election
| Candidate | Votes | % |
|---|---|---|
| Joyce Craig (incumbent) | 5,488 | 52.47 |
| Victoria Sullivan | 2,549 | 24.37 |
| Richard H. Girard | 2,423 | 23.16 |
| Total votes | 10,460 | 100 |

General election

2021 Manchester, New Hampshire, mayoral election
| Candidate | Votes | % |
|---|---|---|
| Joyce Craig (incumbent) | 10,247 | 52.42 |
| Victoria Sullivan | 9,016 | 46.12 |
| Overvotes and undervotes | 156 | 0.80 |
| Write-ins | 130 | 0.66 |
| Total votes | 19,549 | 100 |

== 2023 ==
2023 Manchester, New Hampshire, mayoral election
- November 7, 2023
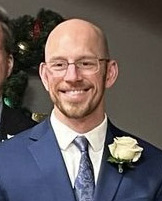

| Candidate | Jay Ruais | Kevin Cavanaugh |
| Party | Nonpartisan | Nonpartisan |
| Popular vote | 9,392 | 8,904 |
| Percentage | 51.33 | 48.67 |
- Ruais: 50–60% Cavanaugh: 50–60%
Mayor before election
Joyce Craig
Democratic
Elected mayor
Jay Ruais
Republican

The 2023 Manchester, New Hampshire, mayoral election was held on November 7, 2023. The incumbent mayor Joyce Craig, a member of the Democratic Party, announced that she would not seek re-election and would instead focus on a run for New Hampshire governor in 2024. This election saw Jay Ruais, a member of the Republican Party, elected to his first term, defeating Democratic Ward 1 alderman and former state senator Kevin Cavanaugh by a margin of 488 votes.

Members of the Board of Aldermen, Board of School Committee, Ward Moderators, Clerks and Selectmen were also elected on November 7 in coinciding elections.

=== Background ===
Though Manchester's municipal elections are officially nonpartisan, candidates tend to associate themselves with either the Democratic Party or Republican Party. Jay Ruais, a member of the Republican Party, served as an infantry officer for the New Hampshire Army National Guard and had previously worked as chief of staff for former U.S. Representative Frank Guinta. Incumbent mayor Joyce Craig, a member of the Democratic Party, had previously unseated former mayor Ted Gatsas in a 2017 rematch after losing to him in 2015. She had won re-election to a third term in the 2021 Manchester, New Hampshire, mayoral election against Victoria Sullivan.

=== Candidates ===
==== Advanced to general ====
- Kevin Cavanaugh (Democrat), alderman for ward 1 (2015–present) and former state senator from the 16th district
- Jay Ruais (Republican), New Hampshire Army National Guard officer and former chief of staff for then-U.S. Representative Frank Guinta

==== Eliminated in primary ====
- Will Stewart (Democrat), alderman for ward 2
- June Trisciani (Democrat), at-large alderman

==== Declined ====
- Joyce Craig (Democratic), incumbent mayor (running for governor in 2024, endorsed Cavanaugh)
- Ted Gatsas (Republican), New Hampshire Executive Councilor from the 4th district and former mayor of Manchester (endorsed Ruais)
- Richard Girard (Republican), radio host, former alderman, former school board member, and 2001 and 2021 mayoral candidate
- Jim O'Connell, at-large Manchester School Board member (running for re-election, endorsed Cavanaugh)
- Dan O'Neil (Democratic), former alderman (running for at-large alderman seat)
- Victoria Sullivan (Republican), former New Hampshire state representative and 2019 and 2021 mayoral candidate

=== Endorsements ===
Endorsements in bold were made after the first round.

Kevin Cavanaugh (D)

U.S. senators

- Maggie Hassan, U.S. Senator from New Hampshire (2017–present)
- **Jeanne Shaheen**, U.S. Senator from New Hampshire (2009–present) and former Governor of New Hampshire (1997–2003)

U.S. representatives

- **Chris Pappas**, U.S. Representative from NH-1 (2019–present)

State senators

- Lou D'Allesandro, SD-20 (1998–present)

State representatives

- Donald Bouchard, state representative (2018–present)
- Erika Connors, state representative (2017–2022)
- Patricia Cornell, state representative (2014–present)
- Jeff Goley, state representative (1998–2002, 2004–present)
- Mary Heath, state representative (2013–present) and Ward 7 alderman (2022–present)

Local officials

- Peter Argeropoulos, at-large Manchester School Board member (2022–present)
- Bill Barry, Ward 10 alderman (2014–present)
- Craig Brown, Ward 1 Manchester Water Commissioner (2021–present)
- Joyce Craig, outgoing mayor of Manchester (2018–present)
- Norm Gamache, Ward 11 alderman (2012–present)
- Jim O'Connell, at-large Manchester School Board member (2020–present)

Party officials

- **Troy Price**, New Hampshire Democratic Party Executive Director (2021–present)
- Alan Raff, former Manchester City Democratic Party Chair (2021–2023)
- Kathy Sullivan, former New Hampshire Democratic Party Chairwoman (1999–2007)

Labor unions

- International Association of Bridge, Structural, Ornamental and Reinforcing Iron Workers Local 7
- International Association of Fire Fighters Local 856 and 3820 and Professional Fire Fighters of New Hampshire
- International Brotherhood of Electrical Workers Local 490
- International Brotherhood of Teamsters Local 633
- International Union of Painters and Allied Trades District Councils 2 and 35
- Manchester Police Patrolmen's Association
- Massachusetts & Northern New England Laborers' District Council
- New Hampshire AFL-CIO
- Sheet Metal Workers' International Association Local 17
- United Association Local 131

Organizations

- **Planned Parenthood New Hampshire Action Fund**
Jay Ruais (R)

Federal officials

- Thomas Colantuono, former U.S. Attorney for the District of New Hampshire (2001–2009)

U.S. senators

- Kelly Ayotte, former U.S. Senator from New Hampshire (2011–2017)

U.S. representatives

- Frank Guinta, former U.S. Representative from NH-01 (2011–2013, 2015–2017) and former mayor of Manchester (2006–2010)

State officials

- Chris Sununu, Governor of New Hampshire (2017–present)

State senators

- Regina Birdsell, SD-19 (2014–present)
- Tom DeBlois, SD-18 (2010–2012)
- **Bobby Stephen**, SD-18 (1980–1990)

State representatives

- Ross Berry, state representative (2020–present)
- Brian Cole, state representative (2022–present)
- Larry Gagne, state representative (2022–present)
- Ray Hebert, former state representative (2004–2006)
- Will Infantine, state representative (2022–present)
- Ross Terrio, former state representative (2011–2013), Ward 7 Manchester Board of School Committee member (2014–2020), and Ward 7 alderman (2020–2022)

Municipal officials

- John Coughlin, Hillsborough County Attorney (2020–present)

Local officials

- **Timothy Baines**, former Ward 3 alderman (2015–2019) and son of former Manchester mayor Robert A. Baines (Independent) (endorsed Stewart in the first round)
- Rick Dumont, former Ward 2 Manchester Board of School Committee member (1996–2000)
- Ted Gatsas, New Hampshire Executive Councilor from the 4th district (2019–present) and former mayor of Manchester (2010–2018)
- Carlos Gonzalez, Ward 12 Manchester Board of School Committee member (2021–present) and former state representative (2010–2016)
- Sebastian Sharonov, former Ward 6 alderman (2021–2023)
- Ken Tassey, Ward 6 Manchester Board of School Committee member (2021–present)

Organizations

- **Cornerstone Policy Research Action**
Will Stewart (D)

State representatives

- Linda DiSilvestro, state representative (2012–present)
- Nicole Leapley, state representative (2022–present) and Ward 11 Manchester Board of School Committee member (2020–present)
- Israel Piedra, former state representative (2018–2022)
- David Preece, state representative (2022–present)
- Christine Seibert, state representative (2022–present)
- Peter Sullivan, state representative (2001–2006, 2012–2014)

Local officials

- Patrick Arnold, former Ward 12 alderman (2009–2014) and former 2013 and 2015 mayoral candidate
- Timothy Baines, former Ward 3 alderman (2015–2019) and son of former Manchester mayor Robert A. Baines (Independent) (endorsed Ruais in the runoff)
- Jason Bonilla, Ward 5 Manchester Board of School Committee member (2022–present)
- Jerome Duval, former Ward 4 alderman (2005–2007) and former Manchester Police Commissioner (2009)
- Erin George-Kelly, Ward 12 alderman (2021–present)
- Chris Potter, Ward 7 Manchester Board of School Committee member (2022–present)
June Trisciani (D)

State representatives

- Jane Beaulieu, state representative (2004–2010, 2012–present)
- Mary Freitas, state representative (2022–present)
- Heidi Hamer, state representative (2022–present)

Local officials

- Jim Burkush, Ward 9 alderman (2022–present) and former Chief of the Manchester Fire Department (2008–2016)
- Gary Hamer, Ward 10 alderman (2022–present)
- John Rist, University System of New Hampshire Ward 7 Trustee (2013–present) and campaign co-chair
- Sean Sargent, Vice Chair of the Manchester Planning Board (2020–present)

Organizations

- EMILY's List

=== Results ===
Primary election

2023 Manchester, New Hampshire, mayoral primary election
| Candidate | Votes | % |
|---|---|---|
| Jay Ruais | **4,296** | **41.68** |
| Kevin Cavanaugh | **2,570** | **24.93** |
| Will Stewart | 1,987 | 19.28 |
| June Trisciani | 1,455 | 14.12 |
| Total votes | **10,308** | **100** |

General election

2023 Manchester, New Hampshire, mayoral general election
| Candidate | Votes | % |
|---|---|---|
| Jay Ruais | **9,392** | **51.33** |
| Kevin Cavanaugh | 8,904 | 48.67 |
| Total votes | **18,296** | **100** |

== 2025 ==
2025 Manchester, New Hampshire, mayoral election
- November 4, 2025
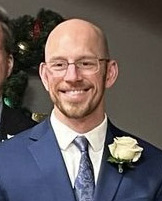

| Candidate | Jay Ruais | Jessica Spillers |
| Party | Nonpartisan | Nonpartisan |
| Popular vote | 9,618 | 6,704 |
| Percentage | 59.05% | 40.95% |
Mayor before election
Jay Ruais
Republican
Elected mayor
Jay Ruais
Republican

The 2025 Manchester, New Hampshire, mayoral election will be held on November 4, 2025. The incumbent mayor Jay Ruais, a member of the Republican Party, has declared his campaign for reelection.

=== Background ===
Though Manchester's municipal elections are officially nonpartisan, candidates tend to associate themselves with either the Democratic Party or Republican Party. Incumbent mayor Jay Ruais, a Republican, defeated Democratic Ward 1 alderman Kevin Cavanaugh and was elected mayor, swinging the mayoral seat from Democrat to Republican-held after its previous incumbent, Joyce Craig, opted to run for the 2024 New Hampshire gubernatorial election instead. Craig later lost to Republican Kelly Ayotte.

In March 2025, Republican Ward 6 alderman Crissy Kantor announced her bid against Ruais; however, she opted to run for reelection instead. No Democratic challenger stepped forward until July 24, 2025, when Democratic Ward 8 school board member Jessica Spillers announced her bid, one day before the filing deadline.

Since only two candidates filed by the July 25 deadline, no mayoral primary would be held on September 16, and both candidates advanced to the November 4 general election.

In the 2024 presidential election, the Democratic ticket of Kamala Harris and Tim Walz earned 27,729 votes in Manchester, while the Republican ticket of Donald Trump and JD Vance earned 23,746 votes.

=== Candidates ===
==== Declared ====
- Jay Ruais, incumbent mayor (2024–present)
- Jessica Spillers, Ward 8 school board member (2023–present)

==== Withdrawn ====
- Crissy Kantor, Ward 6 alderman (2023–present) (running for reelection)

==== Declined ====
- Kevin Cavanaugh, Ward 1 alderman (2015–2023), former state senator from the 16th district (2017–2022), and runner-up for this seat in 2023 (running to regain seat)

=== Endorsements ===
Jay Ruais (R)

Labor unions

- International Association of Firefighters Local 856
- Manchester Association of Police Supervisors
- Manchester Police Patrolmen's Association
Jessica Spillers (D)

Federal branch officials

- Maura Sullivan, former Assistant to the Secretary of Defense for Public Affairs (2015)

State legislators

- Patrick Long, state senator from the 20th district (2024–present) and Ward 3 alderman (2008–present)

Local officials

- Christine Fajardo, Ward 4 alderman (2022–present)
- June Trisciani, former at-large alderman (2022–2024) and 2023 mayoral candidate
- Leslie Want, Ward 4 school board member (2016–present)

Party officials

- Joshua Query, Manchester City Democratic Party Chair (2023–present) and former state representative from Hillsborough's 16th district (2018–2022)

Organizations

- New Hampshire Young Democrats
- Run for Something

==== Results ====
General election

2023 Manchester, New Hampshire, mayoral general election
| Candidate | Votes | % |
|---|---|---|
| Jay Ruais | 9,618 | 59.00% |
| Jessica Spillers | 6,684 | 41.00% |
| Total votes | 16,302 | 100 |
