= Ted Gatsas =

American politician

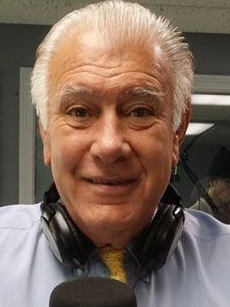

Member of the New Hampshire Executive Council from the 4th district
- In office January 1, 2019 – January 9, 2025
- Preceded by: Chris Pappas
- Succeeded by: John Stephen

55th Mayor of Manchester
- In office January 1, 2010 – January 3, 2018
- Preceded by: Frank Guinta
- Succeeded by: Joyce Craig

Member of the New Hampshire Senate from the 16th district
- In office December 6, 2000 – January 5, 2010
- Preceded by: Patricia Krueger
- Succeeded by: David Boutin

Member of the Manchester Board of Alderman from the 2nd ward
- In office January 3, 2000 – January 3, 2010
- Succeeded by: Ron Ludwig

Personal details
- Born: May 22, 1950 (age 76) Manchester, New Hampshire, U.S.
- Party: Republican
- Spouse: Cassandra Gatsas
- Education: University of New Hampshire at Manchester (BS)

Theodore L. Gatsas (born May 22, 1950) is an American politician and member of the Republican party who had served as mayor of Manchester, New Hampshire, from 2010 to 2018. He was a member of the New Hampshire Senate, representing the 16th District from 2000 until he resigned in 2009 after being elected mayor.

Gatsas was educated at Manchester Central High School. He graduated from the University of New Hampshire at Manchester with a Bachelor of Science degree. He then started Staffing Network, a PEO, with his brother, Michael.

Gatsas was elected alderman in the Manchester city council in 1999, and later elected to the New Hampshire Senate in 2000. He became President of the Senate in 2005 by cutting a deal mid-term with the minority Democrats to remove two-term Republican Senate President Tom Eaton. He was elected Senate Minority Leader after the Democrats took control of the State Senate in 2006.

Gatsas is Greek American. The Greek Orthodox Church Metropolitan of Boston, Metropolitan Methodios, gave the invocation at his 2015 inauguration.

== Political career ==
=== Mayor of Manchester ===
Gatsas first was elected mayor of Manchester, New Hampshire, in 2009, defeating Democrat Mark Roy in the nonpartisan election 10,668 to 8,128. Gatsas won a huge victory over Chris Hebert in the 2011 mayoral contest, taking nearly 70% of the vote. In 2013, Gatsas was again re-elected, defeating Patrick Arnold, but by less than 1,000 votes. In 2015, Gatsas faced his stiffest challenge ever, when he beat Democratic Alderwoman Joyce Craig by only 64 votes, after a recount. In a 2017 rematch, Craig defeated Gatsas, 53% to 47%, thus becoming the first woman to serve as Mayor of Manchester.

==== 2016 New Hampshire gubernatorial race ====
Ted Gatsas entered the race for the Republican Party nomination for Governor of New Hampshire. Gatsas was seen as a strong contender in the field, but came in third behind eventual victor Chris Sununu and the relatively unknown State Representative Frank Edelblut in the five-person field. Gatsas won slightly more than 1,000 votes more than fourth-place finisher Jeanie Forrester. Gatsas lost in every city and town in New Hampshire except for Manchester and the Manchester suburbs of Goffstown and Hooksett. A year after his loss, he had to personally repay $68,000 to his campaign contributors due to finance law irregularities.

The contest between Gatsas and Sununu was bitter. When filing for his campaign bid, Sununu accused the Manchester Police Department of failing to adequately fight the drug crisis, which drew a stern rebuke from Manchester Police Chief Nick Willard. Gatsas called on Sununu to apologize.

==== West High School incident and defamation lawsuit ====
In June 2017, it was revealed that the rape of a 14-year-old girl had occurred at the city's West High School in September 2015. A public uproar ensued when it became apparent that neither the county district attorney, City Hall, the police department or the Manchester school system had reported the rape of the girl to the public. When Joyce Craig criticized Gatsas's handling of the 2015 rape, he accused her of trying to politicize the crime.

Then-Mayor Gatsas first told the New Hampshire Union Leader newspaper that "we were not told a rape occurred at West". Gatsas subsequently claimed he was not told of the "severity" of the incident and emails released from a school district employee show that Gatsas was informed of a "sexual assault" at the school. Both the Police Chief and School Superintendent disputed the Mayor's claim, with both saying they had fully informed the Mayor of the graphic nature of the assault. It came to light that the School Board, the School Superintendent and City Hall considered it the job of another department to inform the public. The revelation of the rape and the failure to inform the public of the crime led to changes in police and school administration policy.

Gatsas was criticized for not revealing that the rape had occurred, and accused of not revealing the crime as he was in a tough reelection battle. Records show Gatsas subsequently sued two political activists, one of which chaired Joyce Craig's previous run for Mayor, who accused him of covering up the rape for political advantage. The lawsuit was dismissed after Mayor Gatsas lost the election.

==== Domestic violence prosecution ====
It was found in the final days of the Gatsas administration that the City Solicitor's office had failed to successfully prosecute domestic violence cases. The City Solicitor, Tom Clark, was appointed by the Board of Aldermen in 1995, well before Gatsas became mayor, and had been reappointed by the Board of Aldermen multiple times. Police Chief Nick Willard, out of concern that victims were not being protected, and even placed in further violence, appealed directly to the Attorney General of New Hampshire for assistance. The chairman of the Board of Aldermen, Pat Long, said "As an elected official I feel a sense of responsibility". The Manchester police department helps in the prosecution of domestic violence cases. The scandal led to the early retirements of city prosecutors and the temporary take-over of the department by the state. A stand-out in the battle against opiates who had attracted national attention, Chief Willard, subsequently was named U.S. Marshal by President Donald Trump.

=== Executive Council ===
In March 2018, Gatsas announced his bid for the office of Executive Councillor from District Four. Gatsas won the Republican nomination by beating Jane Cormier. Gatsas narrowly defeated Democrat Graham "Gray" Chynoweth in the general election, claiming 48.9% of the vote to Chynoweth's 47.4%.
