= David Boutin =

David Boutin may refer to:

- David Boutin (actor) (born 1969), Canadian actor
- David Boutin (politician), American state legislator
