= Scott McGilvray =

American educator and politician

Member of the New Hampshire Senate from the 16th district
- In office January 3, 2017 – March 21, 2017
- Preceded by: David Boutin
- Succeeded by: Kevin Cavanaugh

Personal details
- Born: January 20, 1966 Concord, New Hampshire, U.S.
- Died: March 21, 2017 (aged 51) Boston, Massachusetts, U.S.
- Party: Democratic
- Education: Fitchburg State University; Franklin Pierce University
- Occupation: Teacher, coach, union leader

Scott McGilvray (January 20, 1966 – March 21, 2017) was an American educator and politician.

Born in Concord, New Hampshire, McGilvray went to Concord High School and Fitchburg State University. He received his bachelor's degree in human and health services and his teacher's certificate from Franklin Pierce University. McGilvray lived with his wife and family in Hooksett, New Hampshire. He taught social studies and was the football coach at Manchester Memorial High School in Manchester, New Hampshire. He was also the president of the New Hampshire National Education Association. He served in the New Hampshire Senate for the 16th district in 2017 until his death. McGilvray was a Democrat. McGilvray died in Massachusetts General Hospital in Boston, Massachusetts after a brief illness.
