= 2017 Manchester mayoral election =

2017 Manchester mayoral election may refer to:

- 2017 Greater Manchester mayoral election, in Greater Manchester, England
- 2017 Manchester, New Hampshire, mayoral election, in Manchester, New Hampshire, United States
