= Sucker Creek =

Sucker Creek may refer to:

In Ontario, Canada

- Sucker Creek (Osborne Township), in geographic Osborne Township, Nipissing District

In Minnesota, United States

- Big Sucker Creek

== See also ==
- Sucker Creek Cree First Nation, in Alberta
- Sucker Creek 23, Reserve in Ontario
- Sucker Creek Landing, a community in the municipality of French River, Ontario
- Sucker Creek Formation
- Sucker Brook (disambiguation)
