= Mine Hill (New Hampshire) =

Coordinates: 42°59′22″N 71°20′13″W

Highest point
- Elevation: 585 ft (178 m)
- Prominence: 342 ft (104 m)

Geography
- Location: Auburn, New Hampshire, United States

Geology
- Mountain type: Hill

Climbing
- First ascent: March 1714
- Easiest route: Hike

Mine Hill is a hill in Rockingham County, New Hampshire, on the eastern side of Lake Massabesic.

The summit has an elevation of 585 feet (178 m) above sea level, making it one of the two highest points in the town of Auburn. The other is Mount Miner, which has an elevation of 582 feet (177 m). Mine Hill was the site of a wooden fire lookout tower between 1940 and 1989, maintained and operated by the Manchester Water Works, who own the western side of the hill. It is also the site of Devil's Den, an 80 ft (24 m) long cave, with a 5 ft (1.5 m) high and 2.5 ft (0.76 m) wide entrance, which extends into the hill, in a northern direction. The cave is a source of tremolite.

== See also ==
- Massabesic Lake
- Auburn, New Hampshire
