= Manchester High School West =

Location
- 9 Notre Dame Avenue; Manchester, New Hampshire 03102; United States; 42°59′10″N 71°28′30″W

Information
- School type: Public High School
- Founded: 1923
- School district: Manchester School District
- Superintendent: Jennifer Chmiel
- CEEB code: 300360
- Principal: Richard Dichard
- Staff: 57.20 (FTE)
- Grades: 9–12
- Enrollment: 771 (2023–2024)
- Student to teacher ratio: 13.48
- Colors: Royal blue and white
- Athletics conference: NHIAA; Division II
- Nickname: Blue Knights
- Rivals: Manchester Central High School, Manchester Memorial High School
- Accreditation: New England Association of Schools and Colleges
- Newspaper: Blueprint
- Feeder schools: Middle School at Parkside; Gossler Park School; Northwest School; Parker-Varney School
- Website: west.mansd.org
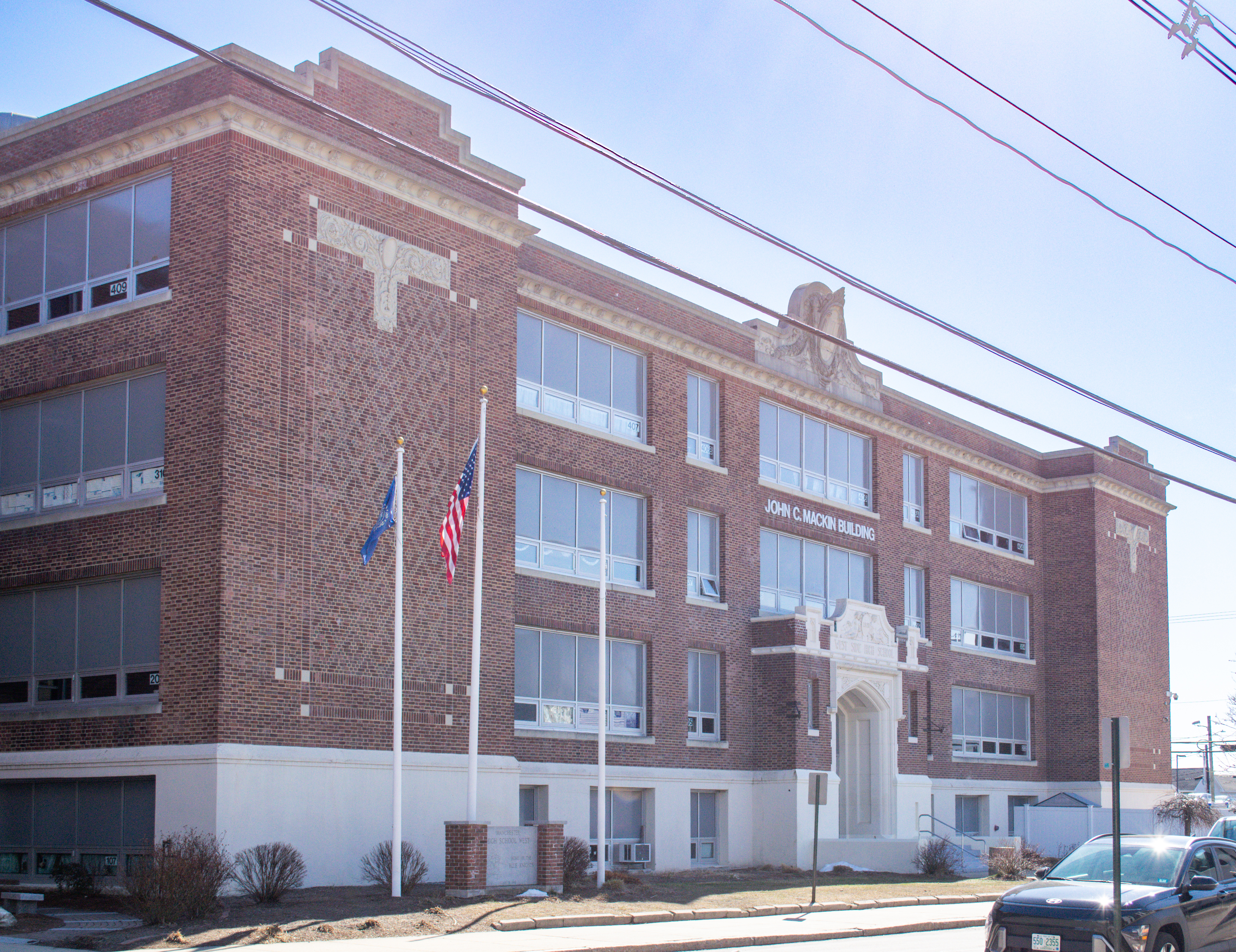

Manchester High School West, known as West High or West, is a public high school located in Manchester, New Hampshire. It is a part of the Manchester School District.According to the Blue Book: Manchester High School West Hand Book (1940), the school was officially opened in September 1923 as a grade school and high school, hosting the seventh and eighth grades. In 1924, with an upsurge in enrollment to 136 pupils, the school became a dedicated high school. The first graduating class was in June 1925.

According to the 1940 Blue Book, the mission of the school was to give "each pupil an opportunity to find a career to which he is best adapted and to establish its basis by diligent study in order to promote his progress in life and to give him confidence in facing the world." The courses of study originally offered by Manchester High School West were manual arts, home economics, the commercial course, the classical course (for those planning to go on to university) and the general course.

West is one of three public high schools in Manchester. Well over 2,000 students attended West at its peak enrollment.

West High School's mascot is the Blue Knight.

== History ==
In the past, Bedford, a suburb of Manchester, sent its high school-aged students to West. In 2005 about 900 high school aged residents of Bedford attended Manchester West.

After a generation of debate and several votes, the town of Bedford eventually voted to build its own high school. The expanding class sizes at West and growing population of Bedford finally convinced Bedford voters of a need for a new high school. Beginning in fall 2007 Bedford stopped sending new students to Manchester West, so it could instead send them to Bedford High. By fall 2009 Bedford no longer sent any levels to Manchester West.

Bedford High School opened at the beginning of the 2007–2008 school year. With the opening of Bedford High School, Bedford students were phased out of West High School, reducing the enrollment at West to around 1,300 students. The New Hampshire Union-Leader stated that post-Bedford High opening the number of students "shrank considerably" and that in 2021 the number was still decreasing.

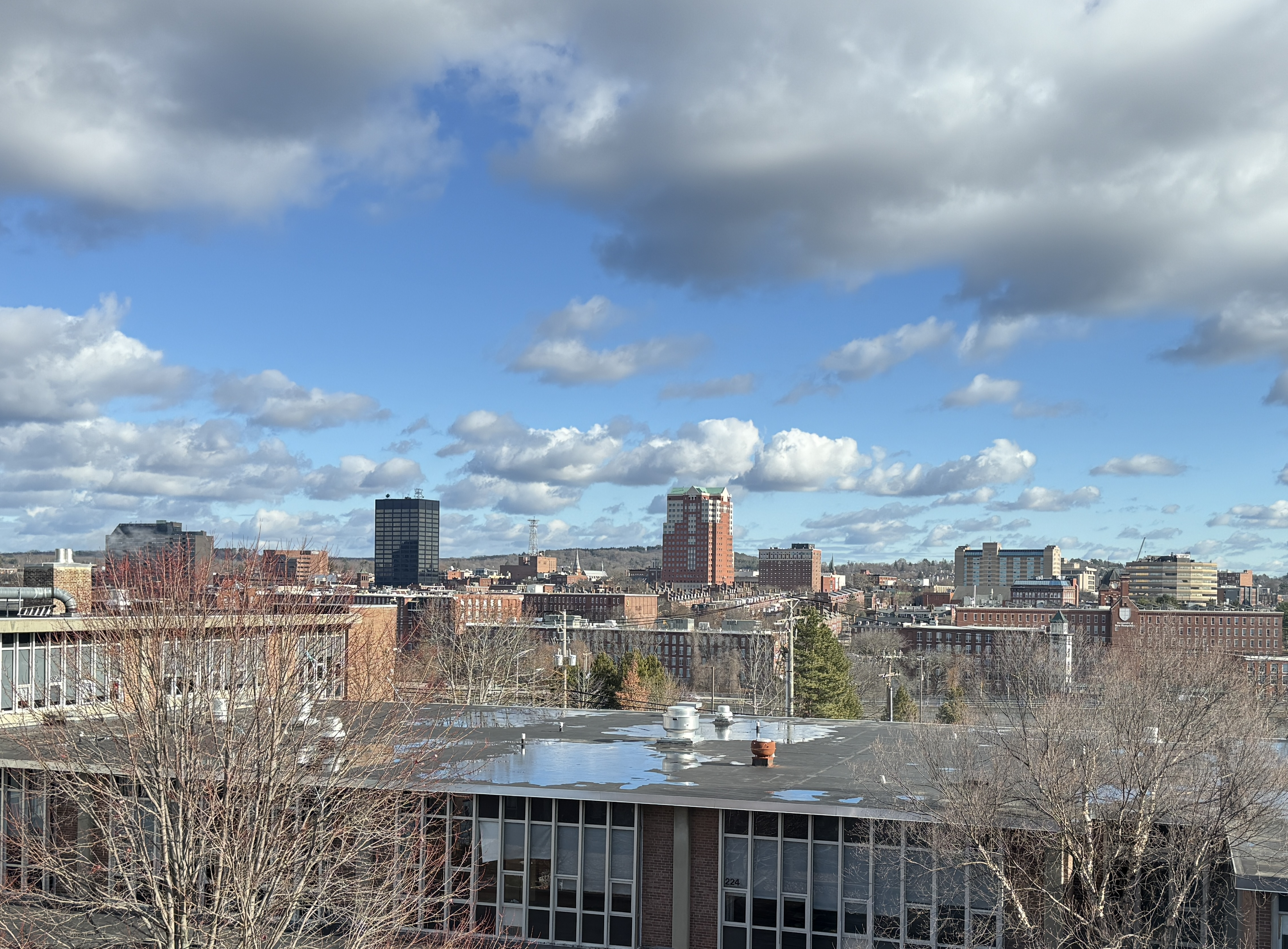
View from Manchester High School West of Manchester's skyline.

== Demographics ==
The demographic breakdown of the 1192 students enrolled for the 2012-2013 school year was:

- Male - 56.9%
- Female - 43.1%
- Native American/Alaskan - 0.7%
- Asian/Pacific islander - 5.0%
- Black - 8.3%
- Hispanic - 10.4%
- White - 72.2%
- Multiracial - 3.4%

== Athletics ==
West athletics once had a particularly strong rivalry with another city high school, Manchester Central High School; however, as of 2016, the two schools are in different NHIAA divisions.

The men's tennis team were state champions in 2005 and runners up in 2007.

In 2007 many of the students interested in playing ice hockey went to Bedford High, causing a decline in Manchester West's hockey team. The three public zoned high schools in Manchester proposed making a co-op hockey team taking from all three schools, but because the combined student population would be higher than that of Pinkerton Academy, the largest high school in the state, the New Hampshire Interscholastic Athletic Association (NHIAA) Classification Committee disallowed that move. West formed a common hockey team with Manchester Central.

== Notable alumni ==
- Janel Bishop, 1991 Miss Teen USA
- Richard Camacho, member of Latin boyband CNCO
- Carrie Jones, NYT and internationally bestselling novelist, podcaster
- Maurice McDonald, co-founder of McDonald's
- Richard McDonald, co-founder of McDonald's
- Josh Meyers, 1994, actor (MADtv, That '70s Show)
- Seth Meyers, 1992, cast member of Saturday Night Live; host of Late Night with Seth Meyers
- Rand Pecknold, NCAA head hockey coach
- Charles Revson, founder of Revlon
- Anok Yai, fashion model

== Sources ==
- "Bedford Withdrawal from West Approved" by Riley Yates, The New Hampshire Union Leader, January 10, 2006.
