= Jane Beaulieu =

American politician

Member of the New Hampshire House of Representatives from the Hillsborough 45 district
- In office December 5, 2012 – December 4, 2024

Member of the New Hampshire House of Representatives from the Hillsborough 17 district
- In office December 1, 2004 – December 1, 2010

Personal details
- Born: Manchester, New Hampshire, U.S.
- Party: Democratic

Jane Ellen Beaulieu is a New Hampshire politician.

== Early life ==
Jane Beaulieu was born in Manchester, New Hampshire. Jane's father was Emile Beaulieu, former state legislator and mayor of Manchester.

== Career ==
Beaulieu is a licensed cosmetologist. She is a small business owner. Beaulieu was an unsuccessful candidate the 2003 Manchester Mayoral Election. Beaulieu served as a member of the New Hampshire House of Representatives where she represented the Hillsborough 17 district from 2004 to 2010.

On November 6, 2012, Beaulieu was elected to the New Hampshire House of Representatives where she represents the Hillsborough 45 district. She assumed office on December 5, 2012. She is a Democrat.

== Personal life ==
Beaulieu is divorced, has one daughter, and one grandson.
