= C. Donald Stritch =

American politician

Member of the New Hampshire House of Representatives from the Rockingham 5th district
- In office 1992–2002

Member of the New Hampshire House of Representatives from the Rockingham 75th district
- In office 2002–2004

Commissioner of Rockingham County, New Hampshire
- In office 2004–2013

Personal details
- Born: Charles Donald Stritch; July 6, 1931 Sanford, Maine, U.S.
- Died: January 5, 2014 (aged 82) Auburn, New Hampshire, U.S.
- Party: Republican
- Education: University of Maine

Charles Donald Stritch (July 6, 1931 – January 5, 2014) was an American politician. A member of the Republican Party, he served in the New Hampshire House of Representatives from 1992 to 2004 and as commissioner of Rockingham County, New Hampshire from 2004 to 2013.

== Life and career ==
Stritch was born in Sanford, Maine, the son of Bertram and Gertrude Stritch. He attended Coburn Classical Institute, graduating in 1949. After graduating, he attended the University of Maine, earning his master's degree in history in 1953, which after earning his degree, he served in the United States Air Force.

Stritch served in the New Hampshire House of Representatives from 1992 to 2004. After his service in the House, he served as commissioner of Rockingham County, New Hampshire from 2004 to 2013.

== Death ==
Stritch died on January 5, 2014, at his home in Auburn, New Hampshire, at the age of 82.
