= Carl Forsaith =

American forestry professor (1888–1982)

Carl C. Forsaith
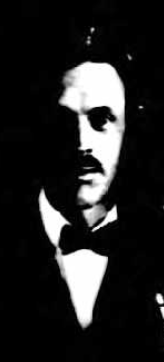
- Forsaith, from his 1925 passport application

chairman of the board of Selectmen of Auburn, New Hampshire
- In office February 9, 1949 – January 28, 1964

Personal details
- Born: September 2, 1888 Auburn, New Hampshire
- Died: August 15, 1982 (aged 93) Auburn, New Hampshire
- Party: Democratic

Carl Cheswell Forsaith (September 2, 1888 – August 15, 1982) was an American writer, forestry professor, and politician, from Auburn, New Hampshire.

== Early life and education ==
Carl Forsaith was born on the Chester Turnpike in Auburn, New Hampshire, on September 2, 1888, the son of Frank Forsaith and Rosa Pingree Forsaith. He attended Auburn Village School and Pinkerton Academy, before completed a bachelor's degree at Dartmouth College in 1913. He earned a Ph.D. from Harvard University in 1915.

== Career ==
Forsaith taught at Dartmouth College early in his career, and at the Imperial Forestry Institute in England for the 1925–1926 academic year. He was a professor of forestry at Syracuse University from 1917 to 1949.

In retirement Forsaith, a Democrat, served on Auburn's Board of Selectmen for almost 15 years, from 1949 to 1964. He was a columnist for Manchester's Union Leader. He wrote a history of Auburn, published in 1970.

== Publications ==
- "A Report on some Allochthonous Peat Deposits in Florida" (1916, 1917)
- "Pollen sterility in relation to the geographical distribution of some Onagraceae" (1916)
- "The technology of New York state timbers" (1926)
- "The strength properties of small beams (match stick size) of southern yellow pine" (1943)
- "Statistics for foresters" (1943)
- Textbook of wood technology (1949, with Harry Philip Brown and Alexis J. Panshin)
- "The Physical Properties of Wood" (1950)

== Personal life and legacy ==
Forsaith married Grace M. Dolber in 1915. He died on August 15, 1982, age 93, in his home on Chester Turnpike. He donated his journal and other personal possessions to the Town of Auburn. They are now kept in the Griffin Free Public Library. His home on the Chester Turnpike was demolished because of mold in June 2012.
