= Maison de L'Amitié =

Former estate in Palm Beach, Florida

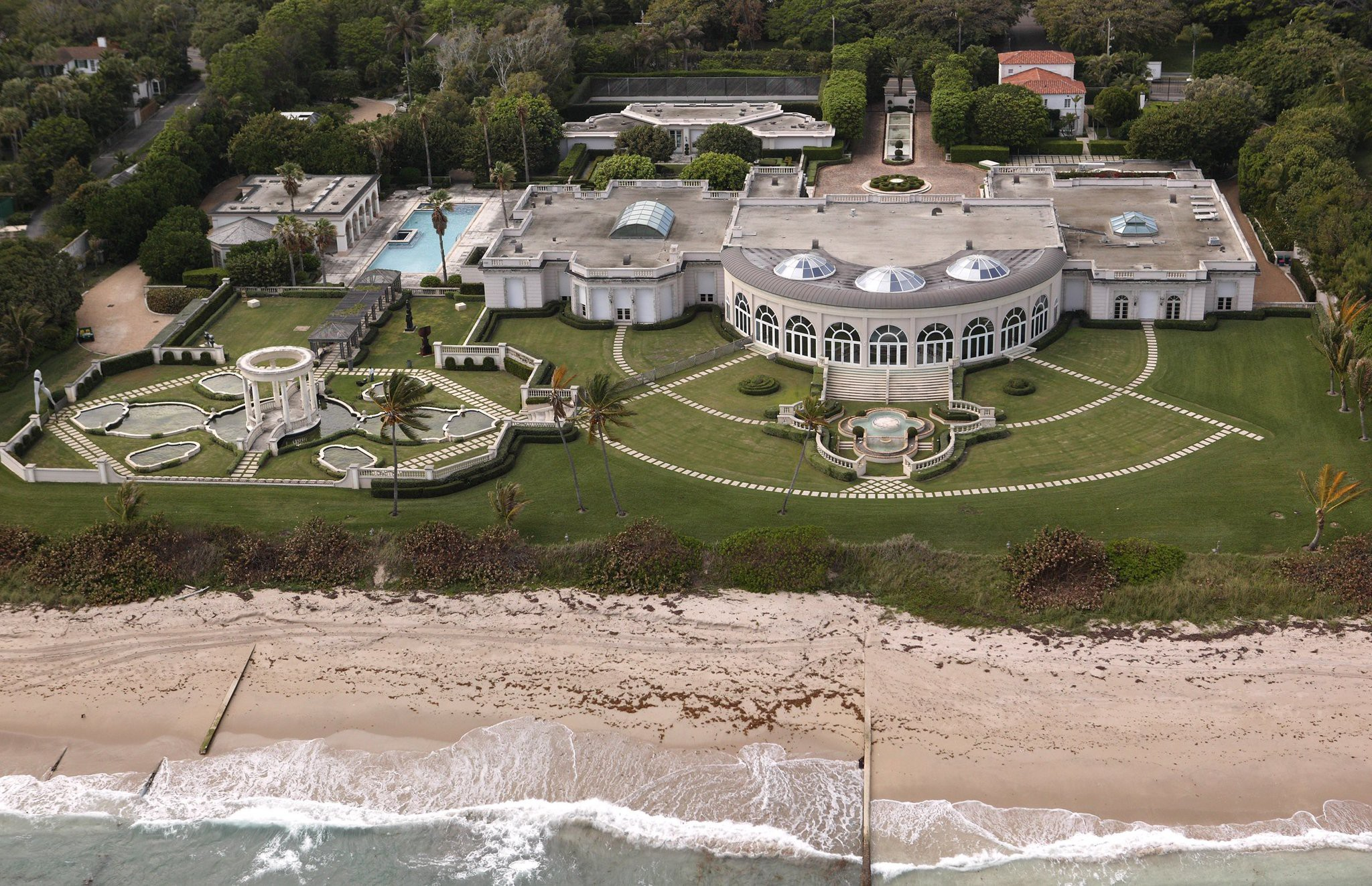
- Interactive map of the Maison de L'Amitié area

General information
- Status: Demolished
- Architectural style: French Regency
- Location: 515 N. County Road, Palm Beach
- Coordinates: 26°43′57″N 80°2′9″W
- Groundbreaking: 1988
- Demolished: March 2016
- Owner: Trust 515 North County Road, Scott Shleifer, Trust ACPB LLC

Maison de L'Amitié (House of Friendship) was a French Regency-style estate in Palm Beach, Florida, United States. The plot area was about 270,000 square feet (25,000 m^{2}) and bordered a length of 492 feet (150 m) on the Atlantic Ocean. It was one of the largest and most expensive homes in the United States. The neoclassical palace had an area of 62,000 square feet (5,800 m^{2}) and its outbuildings an area of 81,740 square feet (7,594 m^{2}). Maison de L'Amitié had three outbuildings: a barn and two houses for guests plus a pool and hot tub. Besides the pool there was an outbuilding with two bedrooms and bathroom. A coach house was located next to the entrance gate, and the third outbuilding was located on the edge of a courtyard. The estate also included a 82,000 square feet (7,600 m^{2}) tennis house.

The home was demolished in 2016. The property was subsequently subdivided into three parcels of around two acres each, the last of which was sold in 2019 amounting to around $108 million in total.

== Interior ==
Maison de L'Amitié had 18 bedrooms, 22 bathrooms, a ballroom, a media room and an art gallery. Behind the door was a room with an area of 4,090 square feet (380 m^{2}) with large windows offering a view of the ocean. The rooms had 18- to 36-feet-high ceilings and were finished with marble and granite. Gold and diamonds were used in the bathrooms. The kitchen had mahogany furniture and stainless steel appliances. Maison de L'Amitié also had a garage which fit nearly 50 cars.

During a tour of the property in 2007, reporter Jose Lambiet noted shortcuts and flaws, including suspiciously thin, bulletproof hurricane windows and gold fixtures in the bathrooms that were only painted gold. Lambiet said that the property had persistent mold and was difficult to air condition.

== History ==
The property of Maison de L'Amitié was formerly owned by Dun & Bradstreet family member Robert Dun Douglass. It was sold to tycoon Harrison Williams in 1930. Owner Jayne Wrightsman sold the house on May 1, 1985, for $10 million to Les Wexner. Three years later, on May 27, 1988, it was sold to Massachusetts nursing home magnate Abraham "Abe" D. Gosman for $12,089,500. Gosman built the mansion on the property and named it Maison de L'Amitié. On July 30, 1999, the house was put in the name of his wife, Linda C. Gosman. After Abe Gosman filed for Chapter 7 bankruptcy liquidation in 2003, the property went up for auction in 2004.

In 2004, a rivalry emerged between Donald Trump and Jeffrey Epstein over a unique six-acre lot with 475 feet of shoreline and a 180-degree ocean view. Trump called the property “the finest piece of land in Florida and probably the US". In November 2004, Donald Trump bought the home for $41.35 million outbidding Jeffrey Epstein. Reportedly, losing the auction angered Epstein, or Epstein’s efforts to buy had bid it up to more than Trump had wanted to pay, and it led to the end of their relationship; for his part, Trump later said he banned Epstein from his Mar-a-Lago club and called him a creep. Trump listed the home in early 2006 for $125 million. An employee of Trump Properties in Florida said that Trump had spent $25 million on renovations, while Trump himself claimed to have only spent around $3 million renovating the house. In March 2008, after cycling through several real estate brokers, Trump lowered the asking price to $100 million. On July 16, 2008, Trump sold the home to Russian billionaire Dmitry Rybolovlev through his County Road Property LLC, for $95 million. At the time it was the most expensive residential property sale to ever occur in the United States. A few months after the purchase, the United States entered a mortgage and financial crisis associated with the collapse of the housing market.

Rybolovlev claimed he purchased the property as an investment for his family and wanted to demolish the house. However, immediately after the purchase of the property, Rybolovlev was involved a lengthy divorce process launched by his now ex-wife Elena. During divorce proceedings for the Rybolovlevs, Dmitry denied direct or indirect ownership of the house in a 2011 deposition. According to him, the real owner of the mansion was a family trust established for the financial future of his two daughters. The house remained empty since the purchase. Due to years of divorce proceedings, in which all the property of Rybolovlev, including the house, was seized, Maison de L'Amitié could not be used.

In 2013, a Palm Beach County appraisal of the house valued it at $59.8 million. The same year, Rybolovlev made the final decision to demolish the house and divide it into 3 lots for sale. He described it as an opportunity to divide the land into smaller plots. A plan to demolish the residence was approved by the Palm Beach architectural commission in April 2016. The Palm Beach Town Council approved a proposal to subdivide the property into three parcels of around two acres each.

One parcel of 2.35 acres (0.95 hectares) sold for $34.34 million in November 2016. The other two were sold for $37 million in October 2017, and $37.29 million in July 2019. All three lots were sold through the brokerage services of Lawrence Moens, an agent with Lawrence A. Moens Associates. Moens was also involved in the sale of Maison de L'Amitié when it was sold by Donald Trump. All three lots amounted to a total of $108.2 million, which is roughly $13 million more than what Rybolovlev paid for the property in 2008.

== Current developments ==
=== 515 North County Road ===
The first and the biggest lot of 2.72 acres (the southernmost) was sold in November 2016 for $34.34 million to 515 North County Road Trust. It's unclear who is behind the ownership but the trust is managed by attorney Maura Ziska. In 2017, the architectural commission granted approval to the lot's owner for the construction of a residential property designed by Bridges, Marsh & Associates. It includes six bedrooms with two-bedroom guest quarters and a total of about 18,500 square feet of living space including a partial basement. It enjoys 173 feet of beachfront.

=== 535 North County Road ===
The second lot (the northernmost) was purchased in October 2017 for $37 million by a company belonging to Mark Pulte to be turned into a $122.7 million property. The mansion at 535 N. Country Road was sold in 2021 to Scott Shleifer, a co-founder of an investment firm Tiger Global Management. The mansion was listed for just one month before attracting the buyer's attention. The purchaser made a quick decision and paid $132 million in cash for the property, which had an initial asking price of $140 million. It was reported that the buyer was represented by Ryan Serhant of Serhant.

The mansion was designed by William M. Boyle of Boyle Architecture. The architectural commission has rejected the project several times before finally approving it. The 21,000-square-foot mansion has 9 bedrooms, a swimming pool, an outdoor movie theater, a gym, sauna and hair salon. It also has a separate guest house. It's not only furnished, but styled with artworks and stocked with spirits. The house enjoys a 150 feet shoreline. It is one of the most expensive home sales in the U.S.

=== 525 North County Road ===
The last third lot of 2.23 acres (the middle one) was sold in July 2019 for $37.29 million. The buyer was ACPB LLC, a Delaware-registered limited liability company represented by law firm of Kochman & Ziska. The identity of the owner is undisclosed. The property at 525 N. Country Road has currently no buildings.
