= Abraham Gosman =

American real estate investor

- Born: Abraham David Gosman; December 8, 1928; Manchester, New Hampshire
- Died: October 21, 2013 (aged 84); Boston, Massachusetts
- Education: Manchester Central High School; University of New Hampshire
- Occupations: Real estate investor, nursing home developer
- Children: 6

Abraham David Gosman (1928–2013) was an American real estate investor and nursing home magnate from Manchester, New Hampshire.

== Early life ==
Gosman was born in 1928 in Manchester to a Jewish family. His parents were Russian immigrants. He was the only child of factory foreman Morris Gosman and his wife Sarah. Abraham graduated from Manchester Central High School in 1945 and from the University of New Hampshire in 1949.

== Career ==
Gosman made his career in Boston area real estate in the 1960s and 1970s by purchasing large, rundown mansions and converting them into nursing homes. His attempted takeover of Multibank Corp. of Quincy, Massachusetts resulted in a large payoff with which he fully focused on the nursing home business. By the 1980s, Gosman took his company Mediplex public, and in 1985, he founded a spin-off company, Meditrust, of which he assumed the positions of chairman of the board and CEO. The company at the time became one of the largest health care real estate companies in the United States, investing in nursing homes, retirement and assisted living facilities, rehabilitation facilities and others.

In 1996 Forbes estimated Gosman to have a fortune of $480 million.

Gosman declared Chapter 11 personal bankruptcy in 2001.

In 2004, Donald Trump salvaged Gosman's Palm Beach mansion Maison de L'Amitie from the U.S. Bankruptcy court and featured it in his TV show The Apprentice.

== Personal life ==
Gosman was married three times and had six children.

== Death ==
Gosman died at 84 in 2013.
