= David Boutin (politician) =

American politician (1953–2024)

Member of the New Hampshire House of Representatives
- In office December 1994 – December 1998
- Constituency: Hillsborough 37th district
- In office December 2008 – December 2010
- Constituency: Merrimack 9th district

Member of the New Hampshire Senate from the 16th district
- In office December 2010 – December 2016
- Preceded by: Ted Gatsas
- Succeeded by: Scott McGilvray

Personal details
- Born: January 27, 1953 Dover, New Hampshire, U.S.
- Died: September 10, 2024 (aged 71) Hooksett, New Hampshire, U.S.
- Party: Republican

David R. Boutin (January 27, 1953 – September 10, 2024) was an American politician from the state of New Hampshire.

Boutin was elected to the New Hampshire House of Representatives in 1994 for the Hillsborough 37th district, representing Manchester's Ward 1. He was re-elected in 1996 and lost re-election in 1998. In 2008, he was elected by the Merrimack 9th district, an represented Hooksett from 2008 to 2010. He was then elected to the New Hampshire Senate, representing the 16th district from 2010 until retiring in 2016. He sought his old senate seat in 2018, but lost to Democrat Kevin Cavanaugh.
