= Auburn, New Hampshire =

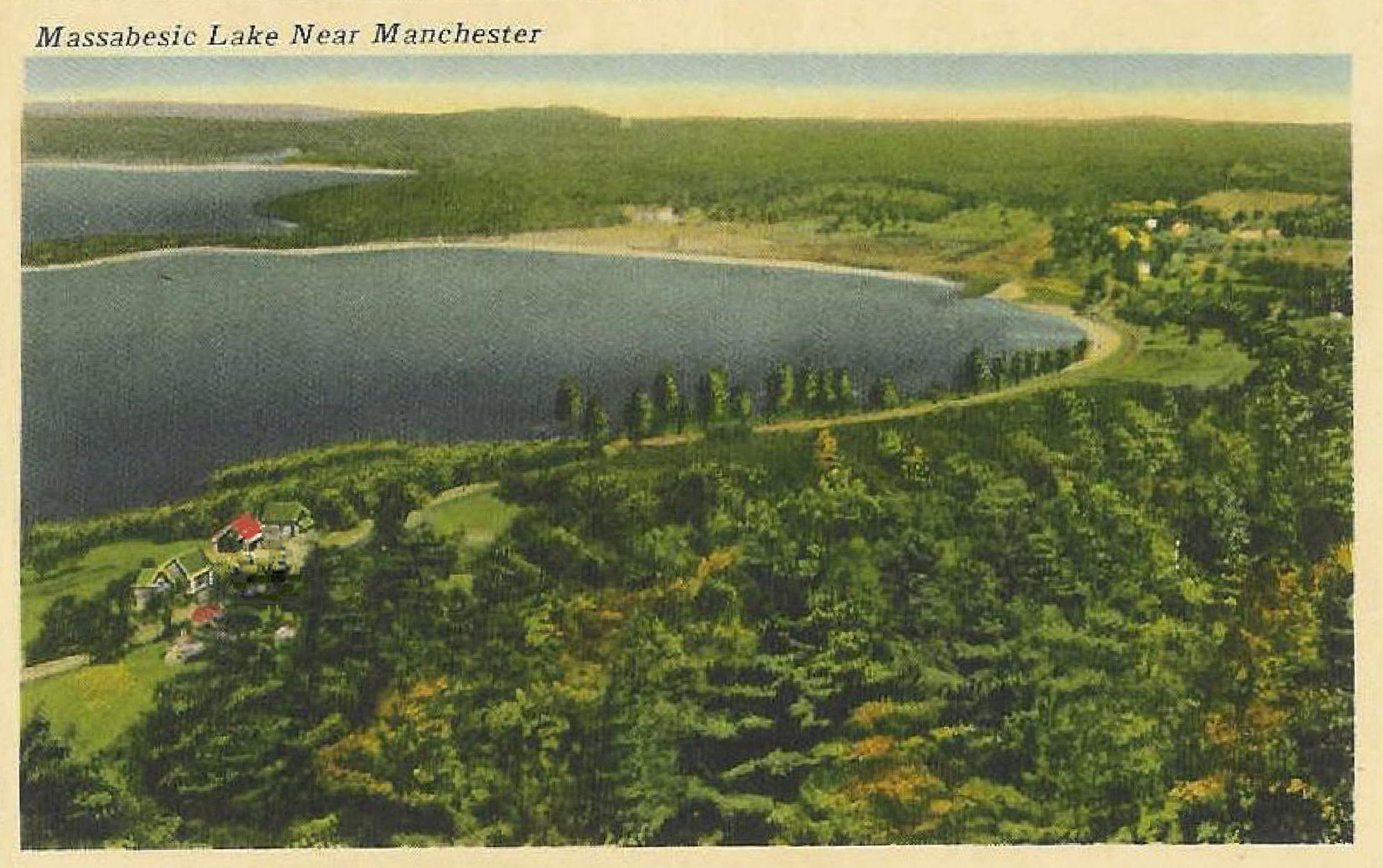
- Massabesic Lake and the east shore in 1920

- Seal

- Location in Rockingham County and the state of New Hampshire.
- Coordinates: 43°00′16″N 71°20′54″W
- Country: United States
- State: New Hampshire
- County: Rockingham
- Incorporated: 1845
- Villages: Auburn; Severance

Area
  - Total: 28.81 sq mi (74.62 km^{2})
  - Land: 25.35 sq mi (65.66 km^{2})
  - Water: 3.46 sq mi (8.96 km^{2}) 12.01%
- Elevation: 246 ft (75 m)

Population (2020)
  - Total: 5,946
  - Density: 235/sq mi (90.6/km^{2})
- Time zone: UTC-5 (Eastern)
  - Summer (DST): UTC-4 (Eastern)
- ZIP code: 03032
- Area code: 603
- FIPS code: 33-02820
- GNIS feature ID: 873536
- Website: www.auburnnh.gov

Auburn is a town in Rockingham County, New Hampshire, United States. The population was 5,946 at the 2020 census, up from 4,953 at the 2010 census.

== History ==
Auburn was originally settled by Native Americans in 1624. It was a fishing settlement called by Native Americans "Massabesic" (the current name of the town's largest lake). British settlers arrived in the area in 1720 and made peace with the Natives until the French and Indian War. The Massabesic settlement was destroyed, and the nearby town of Chester claimed the land. It was known as "Chester Woods", "Chester West Parish", "Long Meadow", and then Auburn. Auburn became an independent town on June 25, 1845, with a population of 1,200 people. As with Auburn, Maine, Auburn, Massachusetts, and Auburn, New York, the name is from Oliver Goldsmith's popular 18th-century poem, "The Deserted Village", which begins:

Sweet Auburn! loveliest village of the plain,
Where health and plenty cheered the labouring swain
Where smiling spring its earliest visit paid,
And parting summer's lingering blooms delayed

Auburn was served by the Concord and Portsmouth Railroad, which later became the Portsmouth Branch of the Boston & Maine Railroad. Auburn was home to a small passenger depot at one time, but by the mid-1900s most rail activity was through traffic, as Auburn had few on-line industries. The last freight trains passed through in the early 1980s. The track was abandoned in 1982 and subsequently torn up between 1983 and 1985.

== Geography ==
According to the United States Census Bureau, the town has a total area of 28.8 square miles (74.6 km^{2}), of which 25.4 square miles (65.7 km^{2}) are land and 3.5 square miles (9.0 km^{2}), or 12.01%, are water. Massabesic Lake, located in the western part of Auburn and the eastern part of Manchester, is the largest body of water in Auburn and serves as the public water supply for Manchester. The lake is fed by numerous tributaries, most notable being Sucker Brook, which enters the northeastern end of the lake near the Auburn town center and itself drains several lakes, including Tower Hill Pond, Clark Pond, and Little Massabesic Lake. Cohas Brook flows through the eastern portion of Auburn and eventually (in Manchester) receives the outflow of Massabesic Lake before flowing west to the Merrimack River. Auburn lies fully within the Merrimack River watershed. Three hills, all overlooking Massabesic Lake, can lay potential claim to being Auburn's highest point: Mount Miner, at 582 feet (177 m) above sea level, located north of the lake; Mine Hill, greater than 580 ft (177 m), above the east shore; and Mount Misery, greater than 580 feet, to the southeast.

=== Climate ===
According to the Köppen Climate Classification system, Auburn has a warm-summer humid continental climate, abbreviated "Dfb" on climate maps. The hottest temperature recorded in Auburn was 105 °F (40.6 °C) on August 3, 1988, while the coldest temperature recorded was −43 °F (−41.7 °C) on February 16, 1943.

Climate data for Auburn, New Hampshire (Massabesic Lake), 1991–2020 normals, extremes 1942–present
Month	Jan	Feb	Mar	Apr	May	Jun	Jul	Aug	Sep	Oct	Nov	Dec	Year
Record high °F (°C)	67 (19)	74 (23)	86 (30)	94 (34)	95 (35)	98 (37)	100 (38)	105 (41)	96 (36)	88 (31)	81 (27)	78 (26)	105 (41)
Mean maximum °F (°C)	53.6 (12.0)	55.4 (13.0)	65.3 (18.5)	80.0 (26.7)	87.8 (31.0)	91.3 (32.9)	92.7 (33.7)	91.5 (33.1)	88.0 (31.1)	76.9 (24.9)	67.3 (19.6)	58.3 (14.6)	94.5 (34.7)
Mean daily maximum °F (°C)	31.7 (−0.2)	34.8 (1.6)	42.9 (6.1)	56.1 (13.4)	67.1 (19.5)	76.0 (24.4)	81.1 (27.3)	79.8 (26.6)	72.9 (22.7)	59.7 (15.4)	48.3 (9.1)	37.5 (3.1)	57.3 (14.1)
Daily mean °F (°C)	22.3 (−5.4)	24.9 (−3.9)	33.2 (0.7)	45.5 (7.5)	56.5 (13.6)	65.8 (18.8)	71.0 (21.7)	69.4 (20.8)	62.3 (16.8)	49.6 (9.8)	39.4 (4.1)	29.1 (−1.6)	47.4 (8.6)
Mean daily minimum °F (°C)	13.0 (−10.6)	15.0 (−9.4)	23.6 (−4.7)	34.9 (1.6)	45.9 (7.7)	55.6 (13.1)	60.9 (16.1)	59.1 (15.1)	51.7 (10.9)	39.5 (4.2)	30.4 (−0.9)	20.8 (−6.2)	37.5 (3.1)
Mean minimum °F (°C)	−9.0 (−22.8)	−6.3 (−21.3)	2.1 (−16.6)	20.6 (−6.3)	30.0 (−1.1)	41.3 (5.2)	48.7 (9.3)	46.9 (8.3)	35.1 (1.7)	24.9 (−3.9)	15.0 (−9.4)	1.4 (−17.0)	−11.1 (−23.9)
Record low °F (°C)	−35 (−37)	−43 (−42)	−22 (−30)	4 (−16)	16 (−9)	29 (−2)	33 (1)	32 (0)	12 (−11)	12 (−11)	−4 (−20)	−25 (−32)	−43 (−42)
Average precipitation inches (mm)	2.67 (68)	2.70 (69)	3.19 (81)	3.49 (89)	3.37 (86)	4.27 (108)	3.65 (93)	3.68 (93)	3.87 (98)	4.36 (111)	3.49 (89)	3.77 (96)	42.51 (1,081)
Average snowfall inches (cm)	15.9 (40)	17.6 (45)	6.7 (17)	0.9 (2.3)	0.0 (0.0)	0.0 (0.0)	0.0 (0.0)	0.0 (0.0)	0.0 (0.0)	0.0 (0.0)	1.1 (2.8)	10.6 (27)	52.8 (134.1)
Average precipitation days (≥ 0.01 in)	8.7	7.2	7.9	9.8	10.7	10.5	9.5	9.4	8.7	10.1	8.8	9.2	110.5
Average snowy days (≥ 0.1 in)	5.2	4.3	2.6	0.3	0.0	0.0	0.0	0.0	0.0	0.0	0.5	3.1	16.0
Source 1: NOAA
Source 2: National Weather Service

=== Adjacent municipalities ===
- Candia (north)
- Chester (east)
- Derry (southeast)
- Londonderry (southwest)
- Manchester (west)
- Hooksett (northwest)

== Demographics ==
Historical population
Census	Pop.	Note	%±
1840	869		—
1850	810		−6.8%
1860	886		9.4%
1870	815		−8.0%
1880	719		−11.8%
1890	631		−12.2%
1900	682		8.1%
1910	637		−6.6%
1920	652		2.4%
1930	735		12.7%
1940	807		9.8%
1950	1,158		43.5%
1960	1,292		11.6%
1970	2,035		57.5%
1980	2,883		41.7%
1990	4,085		41.7%
2000	4,682		14.6%
2010	4,953		5.8%
2020	5,946		20.0%
U.S. Decennial Census

As of the census of 2000, there were 4,682 people, 1,580 households, and 1,322 families residing in the town. The population density was 185.7 inhabitants per square mile (71.7/km^{2}). There were 1,622 housing units at an average density of 64.3 per square mile (24.8/km^{2}). The racial makeup of the town was 98.29% White, 0.21% African American, 0.23% Native American, 0.41% Asian, 0.23% from other races, and 0.62% from two or more races. Hispanic or Latino of any race were 0.94% of the population.

There were 2,349 households, out of which 44.4% had children under the age of 18 living with them, 75.1% were married couples living together, 5.2% had a female householder with no husband present, and 16.3% were non-families. 11.8% of all households were made up of individuals, and 3.3% had someone living alone who was 65 years of age or older. The average household size was 2.96 and the average family size was 3.22.

In the town, the population was spread out, with 28.9% under the age of 18, 6.2% from 18 to 24, 33.0% from 25 to 44, 25.8% from 45 to 64, and 6.1% who were 65 years of age or older. The median age was 37 years. For every 100 females, there were 103.6 males. For every 100 females age 18 and over, there were 103.2 males.

The median income for a household in the town was $70,774, and the median income for a family was $72,578. Males had a median income of $45,000 versus $33,365 for females. The per capita income for the town was $28,405. About 1.6% of families and 1.8% of the population were below the poverty line, including 0.7% of those under age 18 and 11.2% of those age 65 or over.

Since Auburn has an agreement with the city of Manchester that the city and the surrounding towns can use Massabesic Lake as a water source, Manchester, Chester, Candia, Hooksett and Derry pay Auburn an estimated $3 million for Lake Massabesic.

== Attractions ==
Lake Massabesic covers over 2,500 acres (1,000 ha) in Auburn and Manchester and serves as the public water supply for the city of Manchester. Half of the lake (the half farthest from the public water intake) is used for less-intrusive types of boating. No swimming or other contact between users and water is allowed. Devil's Den is a small cave east of Massabesic Lake. The Massabesic Audubon Center is in central Auburn, occupying Battery Point on the lake. The Griffin Mill Dam along Little Massabesic Brook-Sucker Brook is in the northeastern part of the town.

== Events and festivals ==
=== Lake Massabesic Duck Race ===
Every year, the Auburn Historical Association hosts an annual Duck Race on Hooksett Road near a river that flows into Lake Massabesic. The main event starts at the Hooksett road bridge over the Little Massabesic Brook-Sucker Brook where a truck dumps thousands of yellow rubber ducks into the brook, lined with straight yellow floating tubes, and the race ends at a finish line on the left side of the Griffin Mill Bridge, past the waterfall. People buy individual ducks, with prizes going to the owners of the "fastest" ducks to reach the finish line. The event attracts thousands of onlookers each year, to partake in the selection of goods offered at rented booths and/or to watch the ducks leisurely float down the river. There are games for younger kids (usually provided by Auburn Village School volunteers). Visitors are able to access the Griffin Free Public Library, or browse the related booths parked in the Griffin Free Public Library's parking lot. An official pie contest happens at a booth in the Duck race, with 1st, 2nd, and 3rd-place winner's getting special clay pie trays.

=== Yacht Sail Boating Club race ===
Every Sunday, sometimes also during the week, the Yacht Sail Boating Club hosts a sailboat race. Members of the club start on the northern shore of Massabesic Lake, and it ends after going 3 laps around the lake. Many visitors enjoy watching the races from their kayaks, sailboats, and canoes, or at Battery Point, the northernmost point on the Massabesic Peninsula.

=== Book sale ===
The last weekend in July, the Griffin Free Public Library holds a huge book sale at the Auburn Village School. Approximately 10,000 books and games are sold, with all proceeds benefiting the library's programs.

== Education ==
Auburn is part of School Administrative Unit 15, along with the neighboring towns of Hooksett and Candia. SAU-15 administers five schools with Auburn Village School, serving all elementary school and middle school students (grades K–8) in the town.

SAU-15 has no high school; students from Auburn attend high school at Pinkerton Academy (in Derry).

Previously Auburn students attended high school in the Manchester School District, with the vast majority going to Manchester Memorial High School. In 2011, the town voted to change its high school to Pinkerton, with 1,119 in favor and 190 opposing. In 2011 some Auburn students already chose to go to Pinkerton.

== Transportation ==
Three state highways pass through the town. New Hampshire Route 101 is a four-lane expressway that passes through the northern part of the town, leading west to neighboring Manchester and east to Exeter. Access to Auburn is from Exit 2 within the town and Exit 1 just west of the town. New Hampshire Route 28 Bypass travels through the west side of Auburn, leading south to Derry and north to Hooksett. NH 28 Bypass intersects NH 101 at that highway's Exit 1. New Hampshire Route 121 passes through the center of Auburn, leading east to Chester.

There is one private airstrip, Cleary Airport (29NH) located at 33 Bunker Hill Road. The airport has one grass/sod runway 18/36 measuring approximately 3,200 by 60 feet (975 by 18 m).

== Notable people ==
- Joe Dudek (born 1964), member of the College Football Hall of Fame
- Carl Forsaith (1888–1982), author of Auburn, New Hampshire, the town's official history book
- Albert Plummer (1840–1912), physician, legislator
- C. Donald Stritch (1931–2014), politician
