= Joyce Craig =

American politician (born 1967)

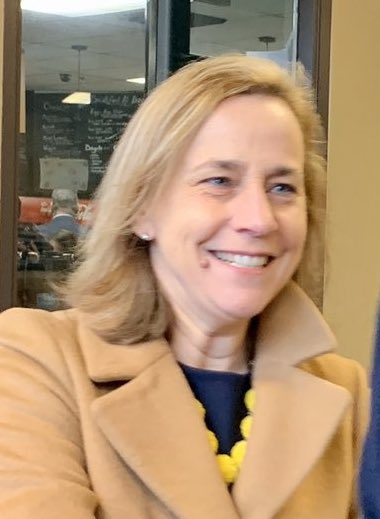

56th Mayor of Manchester
- In office January 2, 2018 – January 2, 2024
- Preceded by: Ted Gatsas
- Succeeded by: Jay Ruais

Personal details
- Born: Joyce Hopkins; March 30, 1967 (age 59) Manchester, New Hampshire, U.S.
- Party: Democratic
- Spouse: Michael Craig (m. 1994)
- Children: 3
- Education: University of New Hampshire (BS)
- Website: Campaign website

Joyce Craig (née Hopkins; born March 30, 1967) is an American politician who served as the 56th mayor of Manchester, New Hampshire. She was the first female mayor of the city, having been elected in 2017.

Craig was the Democratic nominee for governor of New Hampshire in the 2024 election. She lost to former Republican U.S. Senator Kelly Ayotte.

== Early life, education, and career ==
Joyce (née Hopkins) Craig was born on March 30, 1967, into a Jewish family and is a fourth-generation resident of Manchester, New Hampshire. She grew up in the South End of the city, near Crystal Lake in Ward 8. Hopkins was an only child. Her parents, Janet (née Hoffman) and Thomas Hopkins, both attended college but did not graduate and pushed her to succeed.

Craig attended Green Acres Elementary, Southside Middle, and Memorial High School. After graduating from high school, she attended the University of New Hampshire, where she earned a Bachelor of Science degree in business administration.

After college, she moved to Boston to work at the advertising agency Hill Holiday. She started in the message center and worked her way up to an account executive position. Later, she worked for Cynthia Fisher's ViaCord, a Boston-based cord blood stem banking company. She then worked for herself as a property manager.

== Mayor of Manchester ==
=== Elections ===
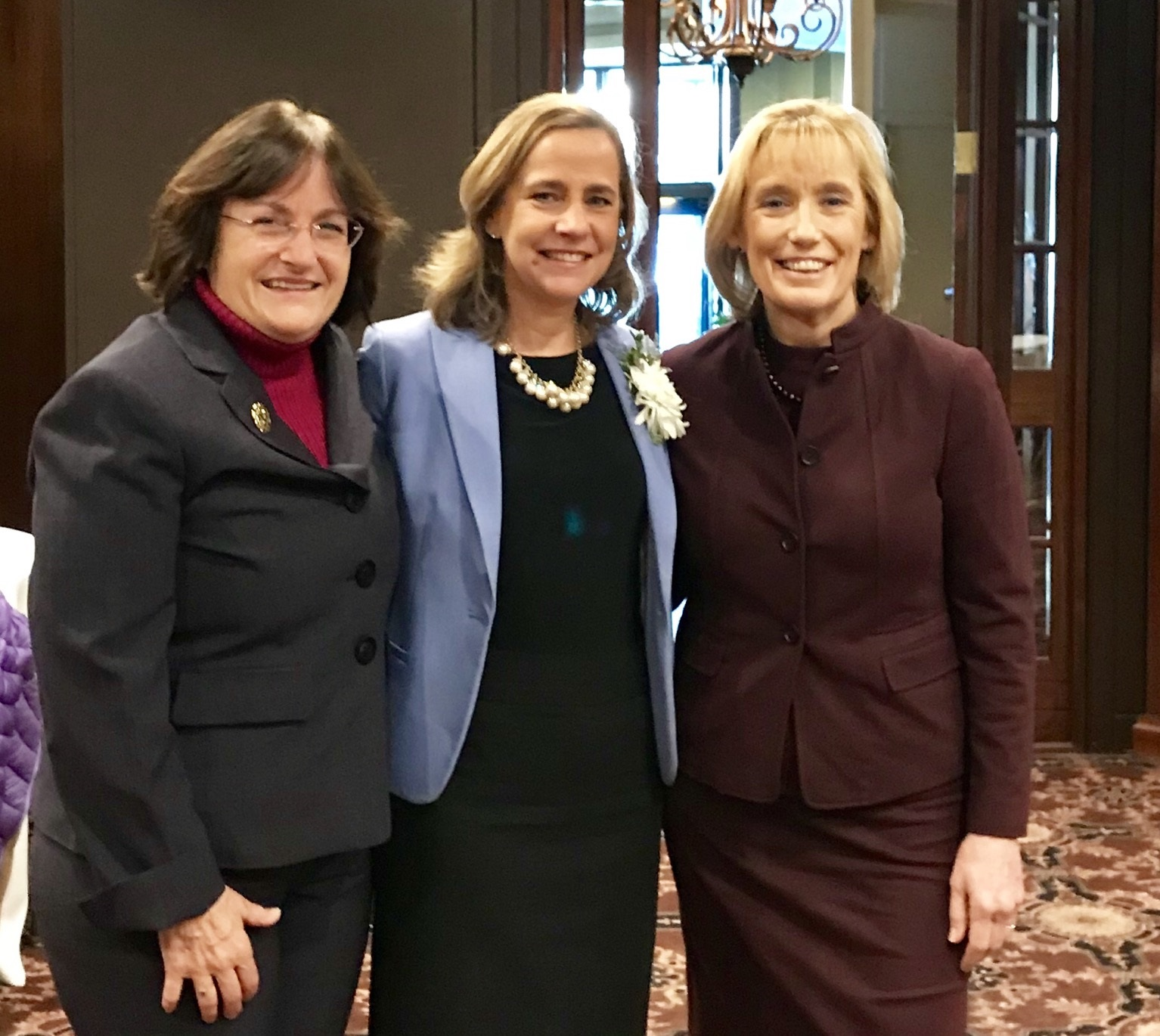
Craig (center) at her swearing-in ceremony with Congresswoman Annie Kuster and U.S. Senator Maggie Hassan.

Craig's first political campaign came in 2007, when she was elected to the Manchester School Board. In 2009, she was elected to the Board of Mayor and Aldermen, where she represented Ward 1 from January 3, 2010 to January 3, 2016, until her first campaign for mayor in 2015, which she narrowly lost. Craig finished second in the nonpartisan blanket primary, thus advancing to face incumbent mayor Ted Gatsas in the general election, where she lost in a recount by 64 votes.

In 2017, Craig again challenged Gatsas, this time finishing first in the nonpartisan blanket primary and defeating Gatsas in the general election 53% to 46%. In doing so, Craig became the first woman ever elected as mayor of Manchester.

=== Tenure ===
Craig was sworn in as the 56th mayor of Manchester on January 2, 2018, promising in her inauguration to focus on improving school quality, combating the opioid epidemic, and promoting the creation of high-tech jobs in the city. On March 16, 2023, Craig announced that she would not seek a fourth term as mayor.

== 2024 gubernatorial campaign ==
In May 2023, Craig formed an exploratory committee for a potential bid for governor in the 2024 election. She announced her bid for the Democratic nomination on July 12. She became the Democratic nominee on September 10, 2024, narrowly defeating New Hampshire Executive Council member Cinde Warmington in the primary. Craig lost the general election 54% to 44%, to Republican Kelly Ayotte, a former U.S. Senator, in the general election.

== Personal life ==
Craig and her husband, attorney Michael Craig, have three children. She enjoys running and has completed 14 marathons, including 10 Boston Marathons.

Political offices
Preceded by Ted Gatsas	Mayor of Manchester; 2018–2024	Succeeded by Jay Ruais
Party political offices
Preceded by Tom Sherman	Democratic nominee for Governor of New Hampshire; 2024	Succeeded by Cinde Warmington
