= Sucker Brook =

Sucker Brook is the name of several streams in the United States:

- Sucker Brook (Lawrence Brook), in central New Jersey
- Sucker Brook (Canandaigua Lake), in the western Finger Lakes region of New York

== See also ==
- Little Massabesic Brook-Sucker Brook, in New Hampshire
