= Cohas Brook =

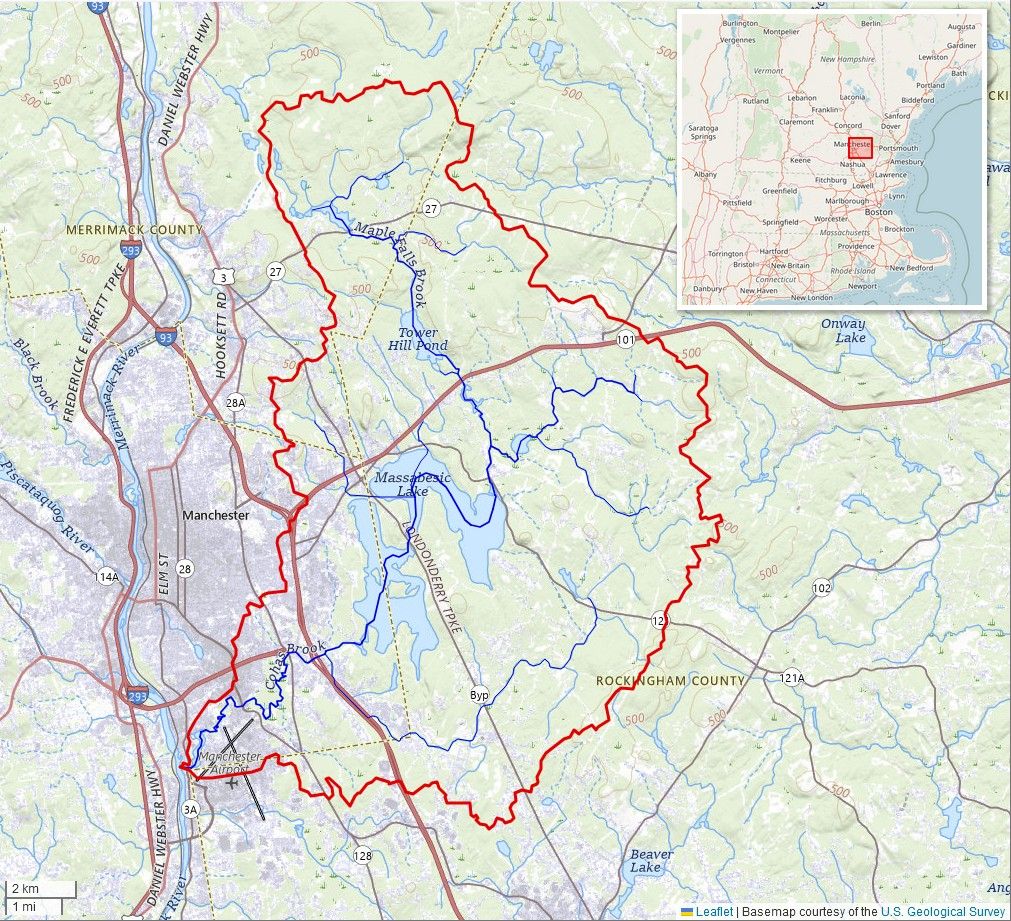
- Cohas Brook watershed (Interactive map)

Location
- Country: United States
- State: New Hampshire
- Counties: Rockingham, Hillsborough
- Towns & cities: Auburn, Londonderry, Manchester

Physical characteristics
- Source
  - location: Auburn
  - coordinates: 42°59′42″N 71°19′38″W
  - elevation: 435 ft (133 m)
- Mouth: Merrimack River
  - location: Manchester
  - coordinates: 42°55′54″N 71°27′15″W
  - elevation: 108 ft (33 m)
- Length: 16.5 mi (26.6 km)
- Basin size: 71 mi^{2} (180 km^{2})

Basin features
- Tributaries
  - right: Outlet of Massabesic Lake

Cohas Brook is a 16.5-mile-long (26.6 km) river located in southern New Hampshire in the United States. It is a tributary of the Merrimack River, part of the Gulf of Maine watershed.

Cohas Brook rises in Auburn, New Hampshire, north of Calef Pond. The brook follows a winding course westward to the Merrimack River in Manchester. In Manchester it picks up the outlet of Massabesic Lake, the water supply for the city. This lower portion was formerly known as the "Coos River".

Much of the brook's course is quite close to intense suburban development, including Interstate routes 93 and 293, the South Willow Street commercial corridor, and Manchester–Boston Regional Airport.

== See also ==
- List of rivers of New Hampshire
