= Lake Massabesic =

Lake in Rockingham County, New Hampshire

- Massabesic Lake
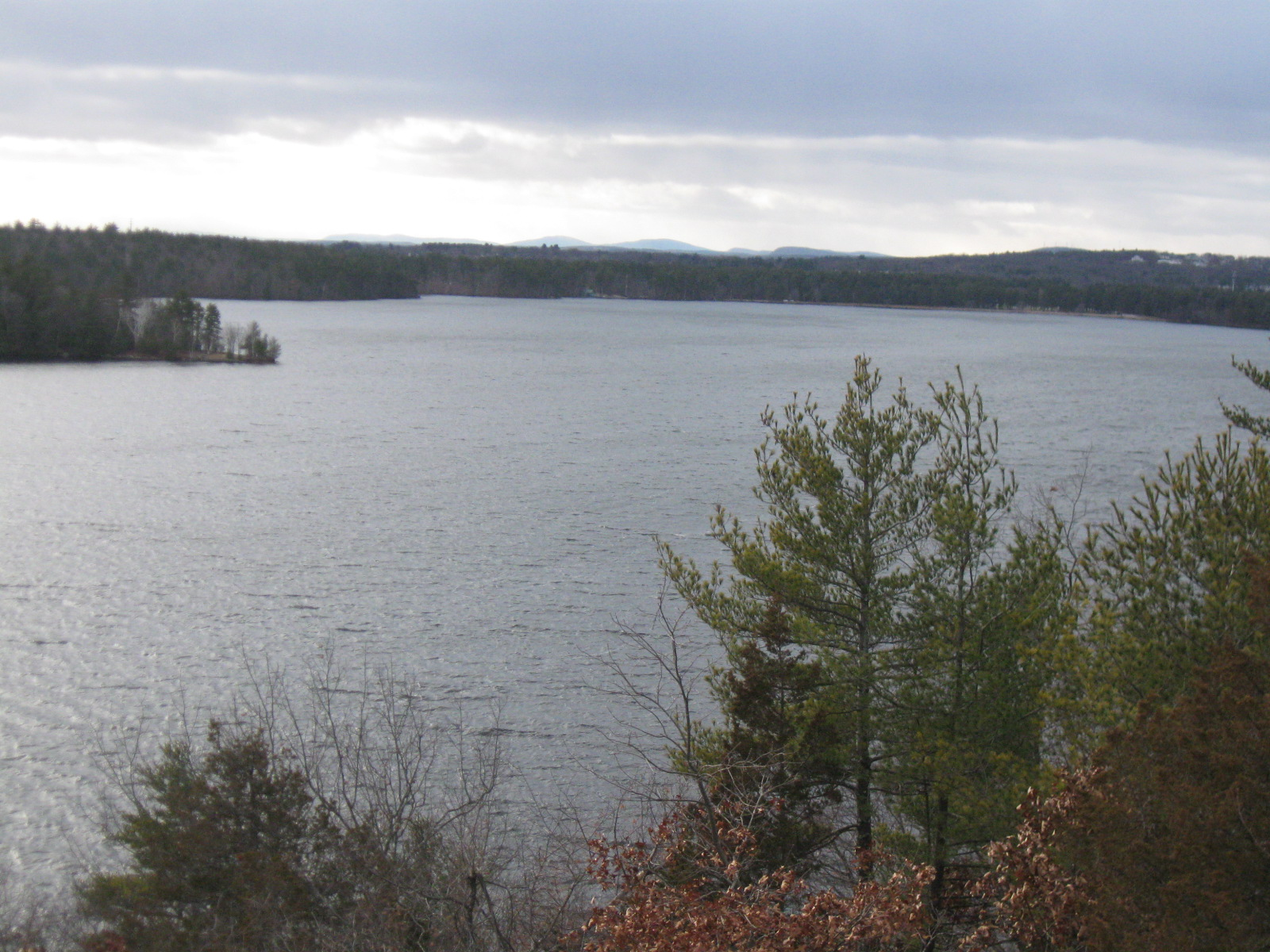
- Looking west over the northern part of the lake

- Location within New Hampshire Location within the United States
- Location: Rockingham County and Hillsborough County, New Hampshire
- Coordinates: 42°59′50″N 71°22′25″W
- Primary inflows: Sucker Brook
- Primary outflows: tributary of Cohas Brook
- Basin countries: United States
- Max. length: 5.6 miles (9.0 km)
- Max. width: 1.3 miles (2.1 km)
- Surface area: 2,560 acres (10.4 km^{2})
- Average depth: 17 ft (5.2 m)
- Max. depth: 50 ft (15 m)
- Surface elevation: 251 feet (77 m)
- Islands: Browns Island; Fletcher Island; Birch Island; Grape Islands; Loon Island; Picnic Island; numerous small islands
- Settlements: Manchester; Auburn

Lake Massabesic or Massabesic Lake is a lake in southern New Hampshire, United States, covering about 2,560 acres (1,040 ha) (equivalent to about 4 sq mi or 10 km^{2}) within the city of Manchester and the town of Auburn. Because it provides drinking water for Manchester, swimming and water skiing are not allowed there. Popular sports on the lake are sailing, fishing, and kayaking. The recreational trails along the lake provide views of the lake and the town of Auburn.

Besides flowing into the Manchester water system, the lake's water feeds Cohas Brook, leading to the Merrimack River. Massabesic is derived from the Abenaki name Massa'nbesek meaning "at the great water" or "to the great pond."

The lake is classified as a cold- and warmwater fishery.

== See also ==
- List of lakes in New Hampshire
