= Kevin Cavanaugh =

American politician

Member of the New Hampshire Senate from the 16th district
- In office August 23, 2017 – December 7, 2022
- Preceded by: Scott McGilvray
- Succeeded by: Keith Murphy

Personal details
- Born: Manchester, New Hampshire, U.S.
- Party: Democratic
- Spouse: Kerri Cavanaugh
- Children: 3

Kevin J. Cavanaugh is an American politician from the state of New Hampshire. A Democrat, Cavanaugh has served on the Manchester Board of Mayor Aldermen for Ward 1 since 2015. From 2017 until 2022, he represented the 16th district in the New Hampshire Senate after winning a special election to succeed deceased fellow Democrat Scott McGilvray. In the State Senate, he chaired the Senate Commerce Committee and was vice chair of the Executive Departments & Administration committee. He did not run for reelection in 2022.

He works as assistant business manager for IBEW Local 2320, a union representing electrical workers and other professions.

On April 24, 2023, Cavanaugh announced his bid for Manchester mayor. Cavanaugh and Republican candidate Jay Ruais advanced to the general election, but on November 7, 2023, Ruais defeated Cavanaugh to become the next mayor of Manchester, New Hampshire.
