= Little Massabesic Brook-Sucker Brook =

Little Massabesic Brook- Sucker Brook
- Location within New Hampshire Location within the United States

Location
- Country: United States
- State: New Hampshire
- County: Rockingham
- Town: Auburn

Physical characteristics
- Source: Little Massabesic Lake
  - location: Auburn
  - coordinates: 43°0′35″N 71°20′20″W
  - elevation: 255 ft (78 m)
- Mouth: Massabesic Lake
  - location: Auburn
  - coordinates: 42°59′58″N 71°20′45″W
  - elevation: 251 ft (77 m)
- Length: 1.9 mi (3.1 km)

Basin features
- Tributaries
  - right: Clark Pond Brook

Little Massabesic Brook and Sucker Brook form a 1.9-mile-long (3.1 km) stream located in southern New Hampshire in the United States. They are tributaries of Massabesic Lake, part of the Merrimack River and Gulf of Maine watersheds. Despite the streams' short length, they are subject to the New Hampshire Comprehensive Shoreland Protection Act, because of their fourth-order stream status (indicating a high number of upstream tributary sets).

Little Massabesic Brook begins at the outlet of Little Massabesic Lake in Auburn, New Hampshire, and flows west to Clark Pond Brook. At this juncture, the stream changes name to Sucker Brook and flows south, past the village proper of Auburn, and enters Massabesic Lake.

== See also ==
- List of rivers of New Hampshire
