= Manchester School District =

School district in New Hampshire, United States

Manchester School District is a school district headquartered in Manchester, New Hampshire.

It is the largest school district in the state, according to the Associated Press.

== History ==
Circa 2003 Hooksett contracted with Manchester to educate its high school students. It was intended to last until 2023.

Previously Bedford had an agreement with the district so that students were sent to Manchester West High School. Beginning in fall 2007 Bedford stopped sending new students to Manchester West, so it could instead send them to Bedford High School. By fall 2009 Bedford no longer sent any levels to Manchester West.

In 2011, the town of Auburn, which previously contracted with Manchester School District and sent the majority of its students to Manchester Memorial High School, voted to change its high school to Pinkerton Academy in Derry, with 1,119 in favor and 190 opposing. In 2011 some Auburn students already chose to go to Pinkerton.

By 2013 the relationship between Hooksett and the Manchester district collapsed, with each side alleging the other violated terms of the agreement. In July 2013 Hooksett and the Manchester district agreed to end their contract early. In October 2013 426 high school students who lived in Hooksett attended Manchester school district schools.

In 2016 the voters in the town of Candia voted to change their high school from Manchester Central High School to Pinkerton Academy, effective 2018, which meant no longer sending high school students to the Manchester School District. The votes were 1,090 in favor and 113 against.

In 2019 John Goldhardt became superintendent. He resigned in February 2022 despite initially planning to do so circa 2024.

== Demographics ==
As of 2012 the district has a large number of English as a second language students due to a program of the U.S. State Department placing refugees in Manchester.

== Schools ==
=== High schools ===
- Manchester High School Central
- Manchester Memorial High School
- Manchester West High School
- Manchester School of Technology

=== Middle schools ===
- Hillside Middle School
- Henry J. McLaughlin Middle School
- Parkside Middle School
- Southside Middle School

=== Elementary schools ===
- Bakersville
- Beech Street
- Gossler Park
- Green Acres
- Highland-Goffe’s Falls
- Jewett Street
- McDonough
- Northwest
- Parker-Varney
- Smyth Road
- Webster
- Weston
- Wilson

Former

- Hallsville Elementary School - The building was made of brick and was three floors tall. In 1891 the cornerstone of the school was placed. In February 2021 the superintendent recommended closing this school so the school district could save money as the district was projected to have a budget deficit of $7,400,000. It closed in June of that year.
