= Manchester High School Central =

Manchester Central High School
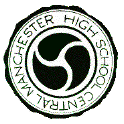

Location
- 207 Lowell Street; Manchester, New Hampshire 03104; United States; 42°59′35″N 71°27′14″W

Information
- School type: Public High School
- Founded: March 30, 1846; 180 years ago
- School district: Manchester School District
- Superintendent: Jenn Gillis
- CEEB code: 300355
- Principal: Debora Roukey
- Staff: 89.30 (FTE)
- Grades: 9–12
- Enrollment: 1,127 (2023–2024)
- Student to teacher ratio: 12.62
- Language: English
- Colors: Green and White
- Athletics conference: NHIAA; Division I
- Mascot: Little Green
- Accreditation: NEASC
- Newspaper: The Little Green, MCHS Oracle
- Communities served: Manchester; Formerly: Candia
- Feeder schools: Henry J. McLaughlin Middle School; Hillside Middle School; Southside Middle School; Middle School at Parkside; Formerly: Henry W. Moore School (K-8) in Candia
- Website: central.mansd.org
- Last updated: January 1, 2018

Manchester High School Central is a public high school in Manchester, New Hampshire. Located in the city's downtown, it has an enrollment of approximately 1,200 students. Students attend from Manchester Hooksett. The name was changed from Manchester High School in 1922 when Manchester West High School opened. Including Central, Manchester has a total of four public high schools, all a part of the Manchester School District.

Its athletics teams are nicknamed the Little Green (after Dartmouth's Big Green) and the school colors are green and white. Sports Illustrated named the school's athletic department as the best in the state of New Hampshire in 2005.

The school originally had crimson red as its school color, but Concord High School had taken the color soon after. After the start of the 20th century, the two schools decided that the winner of a league championship would keep its colors; Concord won, and Manchester Central chose forest green as its new color.

Ronald Mailhot was named interim principal at the end of 2011, following the retirement of former principal John R. Rist, but returned as full-time principal in 2012. Mailhot later resigned in the middle of the 2013-2014 school year and was replaced by John Rist for his second stint as principal of Central. Rist retired at the end of the 2014 school year and was succeeded by John M. Vaccarezza. After Vaccarezza’s departure in 2021, Debora Roukey became the school’s first female principal.

Central High School's student newspaper The Little Green was commended by Columbia Scholastic Press and featured in the Manchester Daily Express as well as the New Hampshire Union Leader. In 2012, the New England Scholastic Press Association (NESPA) awarded its Highest Achievement award in Scholastic Editing and Publishing to the newspaper for the 2011-2012 school year.

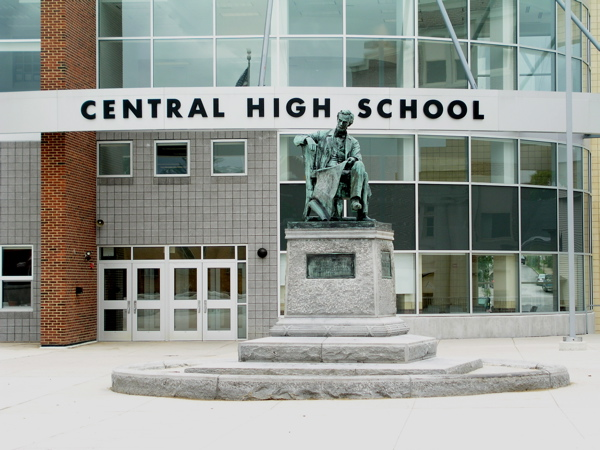
Bronze statue of Abraham Lincoln by John Rogers in front of the Burns Building at Central High School.

== History ==
In 2016 there were about 200 students from Candia. That year Candia voters voted to change their high school from Manchester Central to Pinkerton Academy, effective 2018. The votes were 1,090 in favor and 113 against.

=== Athletics ===
June 7, 1913 H J Reed set a Harvard School Games record in the Pole Vault at 11’- 5 7/8”

== Notable alumni ==
- Abraham Gosman, real estate investor and nursing home developer
- Adam Sandler, actor and comedian
- Bob Beattie, skiing coach and commentator
- Max Clayton, Broadway performer
- Bob Montana, creator of Archie
- Carl A. Osberg, United States Navy pilot and recipient of the Navy Cross
- Chip Kelly, NFL and college football coach
- Chris Pappas, member of the US House of Representatives from New Hampshire's 1st congressional district
- Grace Metalious, author of Peyton Place
- James Broderick, actor and father of actor Matthew Broderick
- James O. Freedman, former president of Dartmouth College
- Jane Badler, actress, star of the 1983 TV miniseries V and its sequels
- Jason Fettig, 28th director of the United States Marine Band
- L. A. "Skip" Bafalis, a member of the United States House of Representatives from Florida's 10th congressional district from 1973 to 1983
- Rene Gagnon, United States Marine, one of the raisers of the American flag at Iwo Jima
- Rogers Blood (1922–1944), a United States Marine Corps Reserve officer and posthumous recipient of the Silver Star for his actions during World War II
- Ryan Day, Ohio State head football coach
- Toby Fox creator of Homestuck, Undertale, and Deltarune
