= Jay Ruais =

American politician

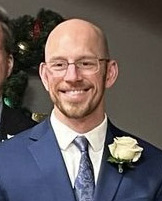
- Ruais in 2024

57th Mayor of Manchester
- Incumbent
- Assumed office January 2, 2024
- Preceded by: Joyce Craig

Personal details
- Born: August 28, 1985 (age 40) Salem, New Hampshire, U.S.
- Party: Republican
- Spouse: Veronica Ruais
- Education: Gettysburg College (BA); American University (MPA)
- Website: Campaign website

Jay P. Ruais is an American politician from the state of New Hampshire who is currently serving as mayor for the city of Manchester, New Hampshire. Ruais is a Republican who was elected mayor of Manchester in November 2023. He was reelected to a second term in 2025.

== Early life, education, and career ==
Ruais was born on August 28, 1985, in Salem, New Hampshire. He graduated with a Bachelor of Arts degree in political science from Gettysburg College in 2008, as well as a Master of Public Administration degree from American University in 2013.

In 2008, Ruais was part of then-incumbent Senator John Edward Sununu's 2008 reelection campaign team, where Sununu lost to Democratic challenger Jeanne Shaheen. He later worked as a legislative assistant for former Congressman Frank Guinta from 2011 to 2013. After Guinta lost his congressional seat to the preceding Democratic seatholder, Carol Shea-Porter, in the 2012 reelection race, Guinta appointed Ruais as his campaign manager for the 2014 House race, in which Guinta defeated Shea-Porter and served until 2017.

Ruais has served as a lobbyist for the Transportation Intermediaries Association since 2013. He was sworn into the New Hampshire Army National Guard on August 6, 2020.

Ruais is a parishioner at Ste. Marie Church on the West Side of Manchester, as well as a member of the Knights of Columbus Council No. 5163. Ruais has worked in the nonprofit sector, including for Catholic Charities of New Hampshire. In November 2019, he was a speaker on behalf of the Addiction Policy Forum at an FDA public meeting on the opioid crisis.

== Personal life ==
Ruais has spoken openly about his past struggles with alcoholism and his two DUI arrests, the latest of which was in 2010, and has said he has been sober since March 9, 2010. He lives in Ward 7 of Manchester and is married to Veronica Ruais, who immigrated from Peru in 2005. He is a practicing Roman Catholic.

Political offices
Preceded by Joyce Craig	Mayor of Manchester; 2024–present	Incumbent
