= Manchester Memorial High School =

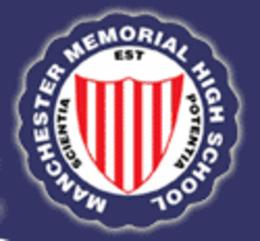

Location
- One Crusader Way; Manchester, New Hampshire 03103; United States
- 42°58′03″N 71°26′05″W

Information
- Type: Public high school
- Motto: Scientia est potentia (Knowledge is power)
- Established: 1960
- School district: Manchester School District
- Principal: Benjamin Dick
- Teaching staff: 96.80 (FTE)
- Enrollment: 1,355 (2023–2024)
- Average class size: 20 students
- Student to teacher ratio: 14.00
- Campus: Urban
- Colors: Red, White, Blue
- Nickname: Crusaders
- Communities served: Manchester; Formerly: Auburn
- Feeder schools: Formerly: Auburn Village School (K-8)
- Website: memorial.mansd.org

Manchester Memorial High School is a four-year comprehensive school in Manchester, New Hampshire, with an enrollment of approximately 1,300. It is a part of the Manchester School District. The school's Latin motto is "scientia est potentia."

Manchester Memorial accepts students from Manchester.

== History ==
Manchester Memorial High School was designed by two Manchester architecture firms: chief designers Dirsa & Lampron assisted by Koehler & Isaak. Construction began in 1959 and the school was opened in 1960.

Previously the majority of the high school students in Auburn were sent to Manchester Memorial.

In 2011, the town of Auburn voted to change its high school to Pinkerton Academy in Derry, and this transfer should be done within the next two years. In 2013 Hooksett and Manchester schools agreed to end their contract for Hooksett students to attend Manchester schools.

== Academics ==
Manchester Memorial High School (MMHS) has received accreditation from the New England Association of Schools and Colleges and from the New Hampshire Department of Education. Manchester Memorial offers vocational education courses at the Manchester School of Technology

The school has a variety of Advanced Placement Program classes. As of the 2014–2015 school year, these included AP Biology, AP Calculus AB, AP Chemistry, AP English Literature, AP English Language, AP Latin, AP Physics 1, AP Studio Art, AP United States Government and Politics, AP Statistics, AP Microeconomics, AP Macroeconomics, and AP Computer Science A. The school also offers American Sign Language (ASL) courses.

== Demographics ==
The demographic breakdown of the 1849 students enrolled for the 2012–2013 school year was:

- Male – 50.4%
- Female – 49.6%
- Native American/Alaskan – 0.6%
- Asian/Pacific islander – 4.1%
- Black – 6.3%
- Hispanic – 11.8%
- White – 72.8%
- Multiracial – 4.4%

Additionally, 35.9% of the students were eligible for free or reduced lunch prices.

== Athletics ==
Memorial High School is a member of the New Hampshire Interscholastic Athletic Association (NHIAA). It participates in Division I for all sports.

The Crusaders won the Division I hockey state champions in 1978, 1989, 1991, 1995 and 2013.

In 2006 the baseball team won the Class L state championship. It was the first title for Memorial in any team sport since the baseball team won the Division I title in 1998.

== History ==
Memorial High opened in 1960. Originally, the school had a statue of a crusader (the school's mascot) outside the administrative office, but this was stolen in the first year and was never replaced.

In 1992, the first annual FIRST Robotics Competition was held in the gymnasium.

== Notable alumni ==
- Robert A. Baines, three-term mayor of Manchester, New Hampshire
- Steve Balboni, Major League Baseball player (New York Yankees, Kansas City Royals, Texas Rangers, Seattle Mariners)
- Robert W. Cone, United States Army general, Commanding Officer of III Armored Corps
- Joyce Craig, two-term mayor of Manchester, first female mayor
- Mike Flanagan, pitcher and Cy Young Award winner with the Baltimore Orioles
- Don Florence, pitcher with the New York Mets
- Chris Lambert, pitcher with the St. Louis Cardinals, Detroit Tigers, Baltimore Orioles
- Hubie McDonough, ice hockey center for the New York Islanders, Los Angeles Kings, and San Jose Sharks
