= New Hampshire's 16th State Senate district =

American legislative district

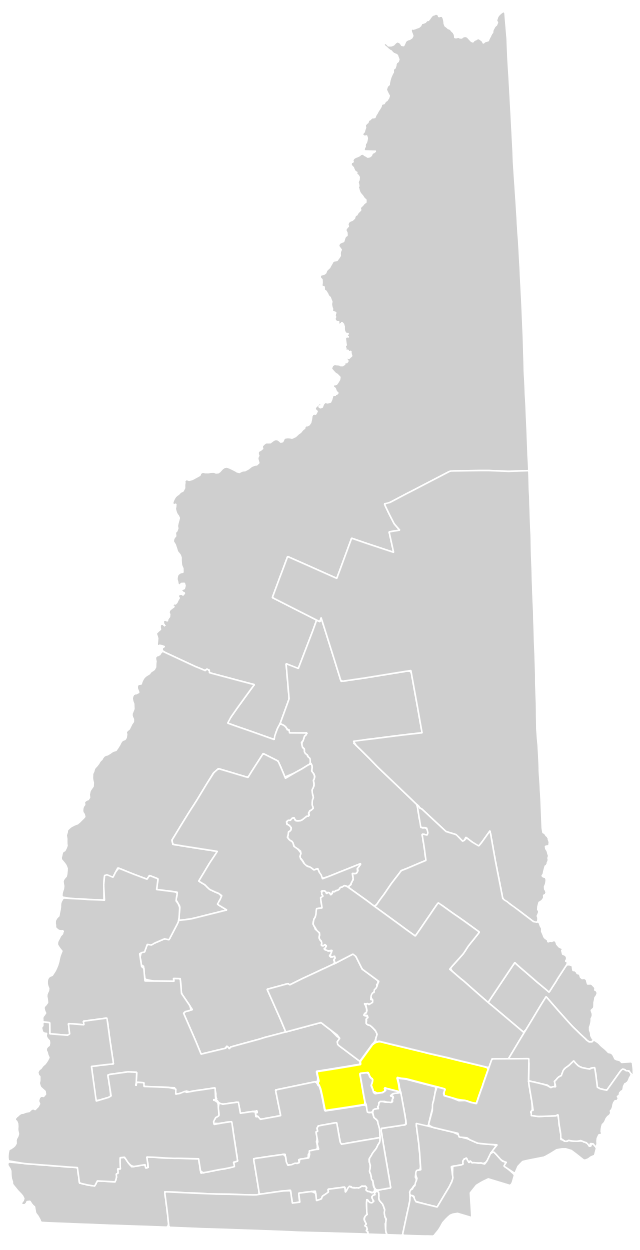
Senator
Keith Murphy; R–Manchester
- Registration: 34.2% Republican; 29.1% Democratic; 36.7% No party preference
- Demographics: 89% White; 2% Black; 3% Hispanic; 3.0% Asian
- Population (2020): 57,841

New Hampshire's 16th State Senate district is one of 24 districts in the New Hampshire Senate. It has been represented by Republican Keith Murphy since 2022.

== Geography ==
District 16 covers parts of Hillsborough and, Merrimack, and Rockingham Counties. It comprises the towns of Candia, Goffstown, Hooksett, Raymond, as well as the city of Manchester's 1st ward.

The district is entirely within New Hampshire's 1st congressional district.

== Recent election results ==
=== 2024 ===
2024 New Hampshire State Senate election, District 16
Party	Candidate	Votes	%
Republican	Keith Murphy (Incumbent)	18,435	56.63
Democratic	Michael York	14,080	43.25
Write-in		39	0.12
Total votes		32,554	100.0
Republican hold			

=== 2022 ===
*Republican Michael Yakubovich was replaced on the ballot with Keith Murphy due to illness.

2022 New Hampshire State Senate election, District 16
Primary election
Party	Candidate	Votes	%
Republican	Michael Yakubovich	3,565	57.5
Republican	Barbara Griffin	2,640	42.5
Total votes		6,205	100
General election
Republican	Keith Murphy	13,494	53.4
Democratic	June Trisciani	11,783	46.6
Total votes		25,227	100
Republican gain from Democratic			

Elections prior to 2022 were held under different district lines.

== Historical election results ==
=== 2020 ===
2020 New Hampshire State Senate election, District 16
Party	Candidate	Votes	%
Democratic	Kevin Cavanaugh (incumbent)	17,165	51.8
Republican	Jason Syversen	15,986	48.2
Total votes		33,151	100
Democratic hold			

=== 2018 ===
2018 New Hampshire State Senate election, District 16
Primary election
Party	Candidate	Votes	%
Republican	David Boutin	2,961	60.0
Republican	Bill Kuch	1,978	40.0
Total votes		4,939	100
General election
Democratic	Kevin Cavanaugh (incumbent)	12,990	52.3
Republican	David Boutin	11,853	47.7
Total votes		24,843	100
Democratic hold			

=== 2017 ===
2017 New Hampshire State Senate special election, District 16
Primary election
Party	Candidate	Votes	%
Democratic	Kevin Cavanaugh	1,377	68.8
Democratic	Jim Normand	624	32.2
Total votes		2,001	100
General election
Democratic	Kevin Cavanaugh	4,751	54.8
Republican	David Boutin	3,817	44.0
Libertarian	Jason Dubrow	109	1.3
Total votes		8,677	100
Democratic hold			

=== 2016 ===
2016 New Hampshire State Senate election, District 16
Primary election
Party	Candidate	Votes	%
Democratic	Scott McGilvray	2,399	81.1
Democratic	Kolawole Ernest Adewumi	558	18.9
Total votes		2,957	100
Republican	Joe Duarte	4,456	96.3
Republican	Donald Winterton	170	3.7
Total votes		4,626	100
General election
Democratic	Scott McGilvray	15,118	51.0
Republican	Joe Duarte	14,503	49.0
Total votes		29,621	100
Democratic gain from Republican			

=== 2014 ===
2014 New Hampshire State Senate election, District 16
Primary election
Party	Candidate	Votes	%
Republican	David Boutin (incumbent)	3,096	54.2
Republican	Jane Cormier	2,613	45.8
Total votes		5,709	100
General election
Republican	David Boutin (incumbent)	11,666	55.8
Democratic	Maureen Raiche Manning	9,255	44.2
Total votes		20,921	100
Republican hold			

=== 2012 ===
2012 New Hampshire State Senate election, District 16
Primary election
Party	Candidate	Votes	%
Republican	David Boutin (incumbent)	13,876	49.1
Democratic	Kathleen Kelley	13,480	47.7
Libertarian	Richard Tomasso	921	3.3
Total votes		28,277	100
Republican hold			

=== Federal and statewide results ===
Year	Office	Results
2020	President	Biden 53.1 – 45.3%
2020	Senate	Shaheen 56.8 – 41.0%
2016	President	Clinton 47.7 – 47.4%
2016	Senate	Ayotte 49.9 – 46.5%
2014	Senate	Shaheen 50.1 – 49.9%
2014	Governor	Hassan 51.2 – 48.8%
2012	President	Romney 50.0 – 49.0%
2012	Governor	Hassan 50.6 – 47.4%
