= Mayoral elections in Manchester, New Hampshire, in the 19th century =

Beginning shortly after the city's incorporation as a city in 1846, elections have been held in the mayor of Manchester, New Hampshire. The following article provides information on the elections for mayor in the city during the 19th century.

== Election laws and history ==
The rules of the original 1846 city charter, in effect for the city's earliest elections, required that, to be elected, a candidate needed to receive a majority of the vote in a mayoral election. If no candidate received a majority, or if the winning candidate refused to take office, further election(s) would be held until an election produced a candidate with a majority of the vote.

From 1846 to 1857, mayors served for a one-year term, expiring on the third Tuesday in March. From 1857 to 1872, the mayor's term expired on the last day of December. In 1873, the term ended annually on the third Tuesday in March, up until 1880, when it became a two-year term.

== 1846 ==
1846 Manchester, New Hampshire, mayoral elections
- August 19, 1846 (first election); September 1, 1846 (second election)
Elected mayor
Hiram Brown
Whig

The 1846 Manchester, New Hampshire, mayoral elections were held to elect the mayor of Manchester, New Hampshire. The first election was part of the first municipal election held after Manchester formally became a city (having previously been a town), which was held on August 19, 1846. The August municipal election's mayoral election, however, failed to produce a winner, as first-place finisher Hiram Brown fell 17 votes shy of the majority threshold needed to win the election. A second election was held on September 1, which saw Brown win a majority.

The candidates in the August election were Hiram Brown, Thomas Brown, William C. Clarke, James McQueston, William Stephens, James Wilkins. Hiram Brown was affiliated with the Whig Party, Thomas Brown was affiliated with the Abolition Party, and Clarke was affiliated with the Democratic Party. Candidates in the September 1 election were Hiram Brown, Thomas Brown, Issac C. Flanders, Jacob F. James, William Stephens, and J. Sullivan Wiggin. Flanders was affiliated with the Democratic Party.

August 19, 1846, Manchester, New Hampshire, mayoral election (no winner)
Candidate	Votes	%

September 1, 1846, Manchester, New Hampshire, mayoral election
Candidate	Votes	%
Hiram Brown	602	52.17
Issac C. Flanders	347	30.07
Other candidates/scattering	205	17.76
Total votes	1,154	100

== 1847 ==
1847 Manchester, New Hampshire, mayoral elections
- March 10, 1847 (first election); March 31, 1847 (second election); April 30, 1847 (third election); May 22, 1847 (fourth election)
Mayor before election
Hiram Brown
Whig
Elected mayor
Jacob F. James
Whig

The 1847 Manchester, New Hampshire, mayoral elections were held on March 10, March 31, April 30, and May 22, 1847, to elect the mayor of Manchester, New Hampshire. The conclusive fourth election saw the election of Jacob F. James.

In the first three elections, no candidate had managed to reach the required majority threshold to win election. In the fourth election, Jacob F. James won election by receiving a majority of the vote.

March 10, 1847, Manchester, New Hampshire, mayoral election (no winner)
Candidate	Votes	%
Jacob F. James	797	47.95
Richard H. Ayer	689	41.46
Thomas Brown	155	9.33
Scattering	21	1.26
Total votes	1,662	100

March 31, 1847, Manchester, New Hampshire, mayoral election (no winner)
Candidate	Votes	%
Jacob F. James	553	41.21
Richard H. Ayer	479	35.69
Thomas Brown	256	19.08
Scattering	54	4.02
Total votes	1,342	100

March 31, 1847, Manchester, New Hampshire, mayoral election (no winner)
Candidate	Votes	%
Jacob F. James	472	45.56
George W. Morrison	316	30.50
Thomas Brown	145	14.00
Scattering	103	0.94
Total votes	1,036	100

May 22, 1847, Manchester, New Hampshire, mayoral election
Candidate	Votes	%
Jacob F. James	644	
George W. Morrison	247	
Thomas Brown	78	
Total votes		100

== 1848 ==
1848 Manchester, New Hampshire, mayoral elections
- March 18, 1848 (first election); April 8, 1848 (second election); April 26, 1848 (third election)
Mayor before election
Jacob F. James
Whig
Elected mayor
Jacob F. James
Whig

The 1848 Manchester, New Hampshire, mayoral elections were held on March 18, April 8, and April 26, 1848, to elect the mayor of Manchester, New Hampshire. The conclusive third election saw the reelection of incumbent mayor Jacob F. James.

In the first two elections, no candidate had managed to reach the required majority threshold to win election. In the third election, Jacob F. James won election by receiving a majority of the vote.

The initial March 18 election had coincided with the elections for the city's aldermen.

March 18, 1848, Manchester, New Hampshire, mayoral election (no winner)
Candidate	Votes	%
Jacob F. James (incumbent)	886	48.10
Moody Currier	603	32.74
Joseph Cochran Jr.	266	14.44
Scattering	107	5.81
Total votes	1,842	100

April 8, 1848, Manchester, New Hampshire, mayoral election (no winner)
Candidate	Votes	%
Jacob F. James (incumbent)	618	46.05
Moody Currier	498	37.11
Joseph Cochran Jr.	144	10.73
Scattering	82	6.11
Total votes	1,342	100

April 26, 1848, Manchester, New Hampshire, mayoral election
Candidate	Votes	%
Jacob F. James (incumbent)	644	
Moody Currier	216	
George Pinkerton	69	
Joseph Cochran Jr.	64	
Total votes		100

== 1849 ==
1849 Manchester, New Hampshire, mayoral elections
- April 1849 (first election); May 1849 (second election); October 1849 (third election)
Mayor before election
Jacob F. James
Whig
Elected mayor
Warren L. Lane
Democratic

The 1849 Manchester, New Hampshire, mayoral elections were held in April, May, and October 1849, to elect the mayor of Manchester, New Hampshire. The conclusive third election saw the election of Warren L. Lane.

In the first two elections, no candidate had managed to reach the required majority threshold to win election. In the third election, Warren L. Lane won election by receiving a majority of the vote.

The third election coincided with the October elections for the city's aldermen.

April 1849 Manchester, New Hampshire, mayoral election (no winner)
Candidate	Votes	%
Jacob F. James (incumbent)	344	40.38
Joseph Cochran Jr.	267	31.34
Mace Moulton	79	9.27
Scattering	162	19.01
Total votes	852	100

May 1849 Manchester, New Hampshire, mayoral election (no winner)
Candidate	Votes	%
Joseph Cohchran Jr.	338	46.43
Jacob F. James (incumbent)	185	25.41
Walter French	152	20.88
Scattering	53	7.28
Total votes	728	100

October 1849 Manchester, New Hampshire, mayoral election
Candidate	Votes	%
Warren L. Lane		
Thomas A. Crosby		
Joseph Cochran Jr.		
Total votes		100

== 1850 ==
1850 Manchester, New Hampshire, mayoral election
Candidate
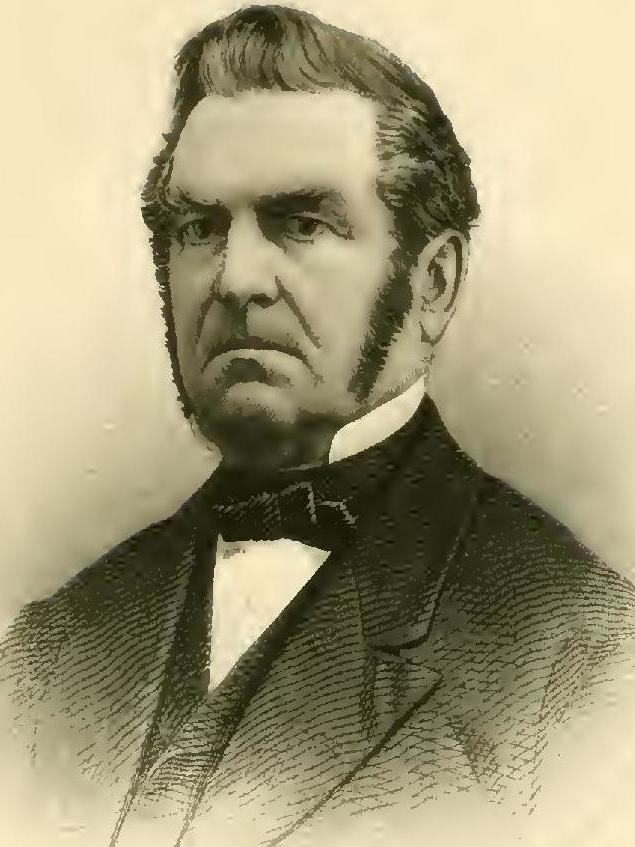
Moses Fellows
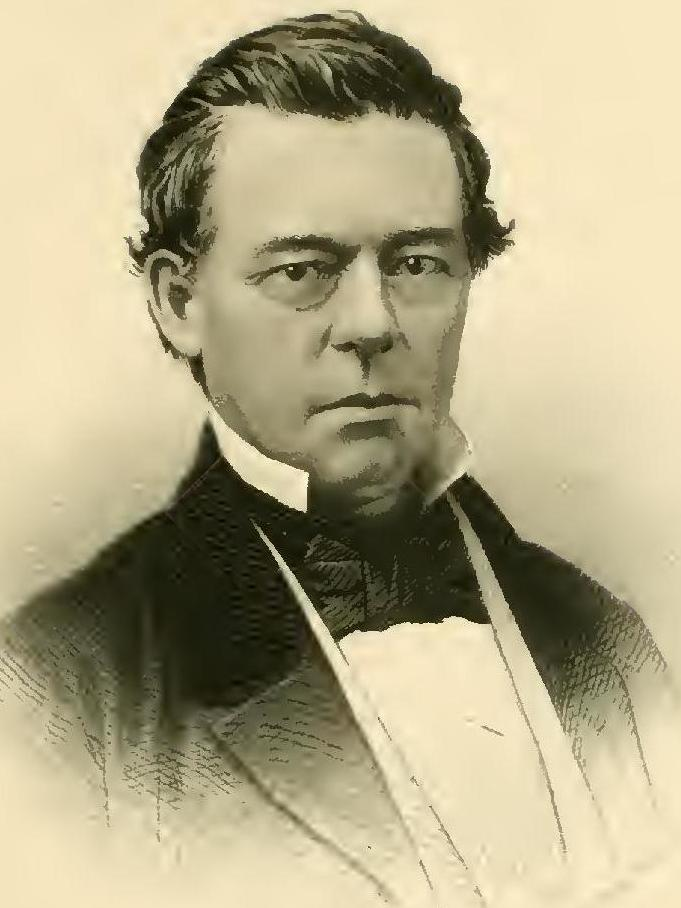
Warren L. Lane
Mayor before election
Warren L. Lane
Democratic
Elected mayor
Moses Fellows

The 1850 Manchester, New Hampshire, mayoral election was held to elect the mayor of Manchester, New Hampshire. It saw the election of Moses Fellows, who unseated incumbent mayor Warren L. Lane. Fellows and Lane were the only two candidates running in the election, which coincided with the city's aldermanic elections.

== 1851 ==
1851 Manchester, New Hampshire, mayoral election
Mayor before election
Moses Fellows
Elected mayor
Moses Fellows

The 1851 Manchester, New Hampshire, mayoral election was held to elect the mayor of Manchester, New Hampshire. It saw the reelection of Moses Fellows, who defeated challengers Walter French, Alonzo Smith, and D.L. Stevens. The election coincided with the city's aldermanic elections.

== 1852 ==
1852 Manchester, New Hampshire, mayoral election
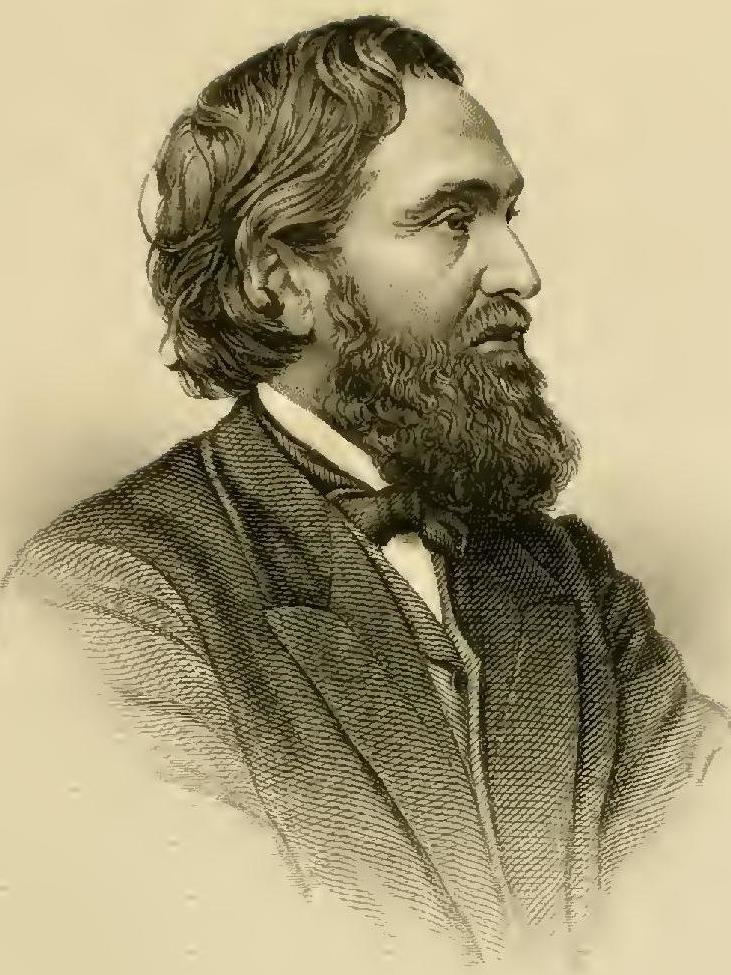

Candidate	Frederick Smyth	Walter French
Mayor before election
Moses Fellows
Elected mayor
Frederick Smyth

The 1852 Manchester, New Hampshire, mayoral election was held to elect the mayor of Manchester, New Hampshire. It saw the election of Frederick Smyth, who defeated Walter French, the only other candidate running in the election. The election coincided with the city's aldermanic elections.

== 1853 ==
1853 Manchester, New Hampshire, mayoral election
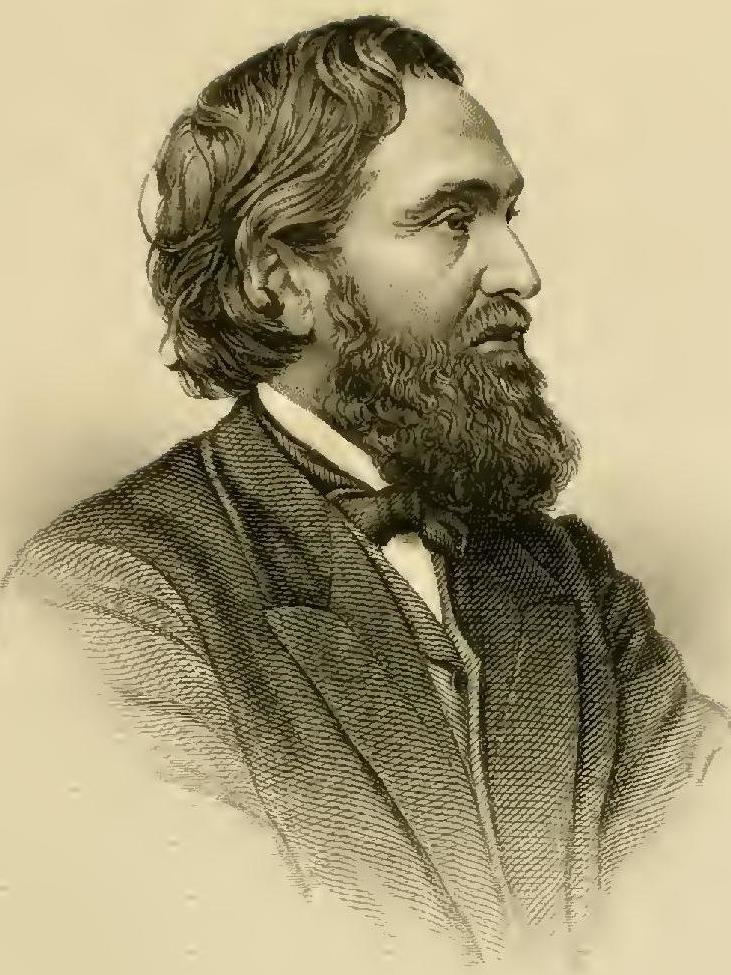

Candidate	Frederick Smyth	Stevens James
Mayor before election
Frederick Smyth
Elected mayor
Frederick Smyth

The 1853 Manchester, New Hampshire, mayoral election was held to elect the mayor of Manchester, New Hampshire. It saw the reelection of Frederick Smyth, who defeated challenger Stevens James, the only other candidate running in the election. The election coincided with the city's aldermanic elections.

== 1854 ==
1854 Manchester, New Hampshire, mayoral election
- March 1854
Candidate
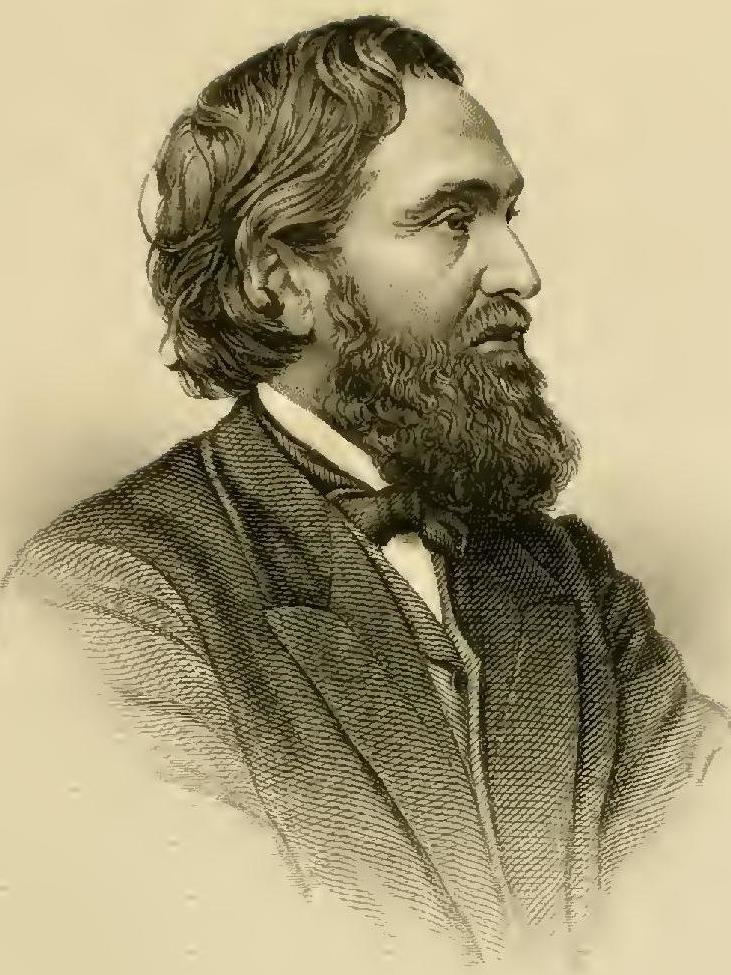
Frederick Smyth
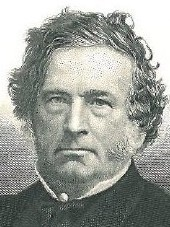
William C. Clarke
Mayor before election
Frederick Smyth
Elected mayor
Frederick Smyth

The 1854 Manchester, New Hampshire, mayoral election was held in March 1854 to elect the mayor of Manchester, New Hampshire. It saw the reelection of Frederick Smyth, who defeated challenger William C. Clarke, the only other candidate running in the election. This made Clarke the first mayor of the city to be elected to a third term. The election coincided with the city's aldermanic elections.

== 1855 ==
1855 Manchester, New Hampshire, mayoral election
- March 1855
Candidate	Theodore T. Abbott	Frederick G. Stark
Mayor before election
Frederick Smyth
Elected mayor
Theodore T. Abbott
American

The 1855 Manchester, New Hampshire, mayoral election was held in March 1855 to elect the mayor of Manchester, New Hampshire. It saw the election of Theodore T. Abbott, who defeated Frederick G. Stark, the only other candidate running in the election. The election coincided with the city's aldermanic elections.

== 1856 (March) ==
March 1856 Manchester, New Hampshire, mayoral election
- March 1856
Candidate	Theodore T. Abbott	George W. Morrison
Mayor before election
Theodore T. Abbott
American
Elected mayor
Theodore T. Abbott
American

The March 1856 Manchester, New Hampshire, mayoral election was held to elect the mayor of Manchester, New Hampshire. It saw the reelection of Theodore T. Abbott, who defeated challenger George W. Morrison, the only other candidate running in the election. The election coincided with the city's aldermanic elections.

== 1856 (November) ==
November 1856 Manchester, New Hampshire, mayoral election
- November 1856
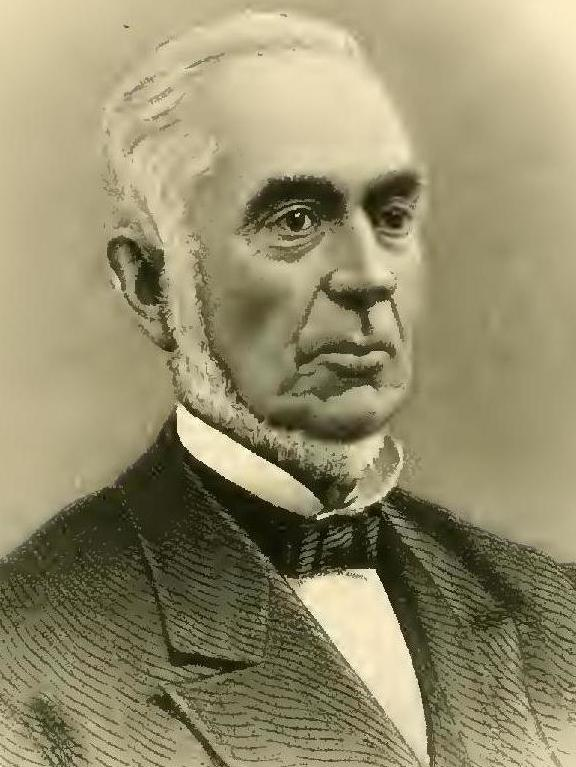

Candidate	Jacob F. James	Isaac C. Flanders
Mayor before election
Theodore T. Abbott
American
Elected mayor
Jacob F. James

The November 1856 Manchester, New Hampshire, mayoral election was held to elect the mayor of Manchester, New Hampshire. It saw the election of Jacob F. James to a third nonconsecutive term. James defeated Isaac C. Flanders, the only other candidate running in the election. The election coincided with the city's aldermanic elections.

== 1857 ==
1857 Manchester, New Hampshire, mayoral election
Mayor before election
Jacob F. James
Elected mayor
Alonzo Smith

The 1857 Manchester, New Hampshire, mayoral election was held to elect the mayor of Manchester, New Hampshire. It saw the election of Alonzo Smith, who defeated both Edward W. Harringon and incumbent mayor Jacob F. James.

== 1858 ==
1858 Manchester, New Hampshire, mayoral election
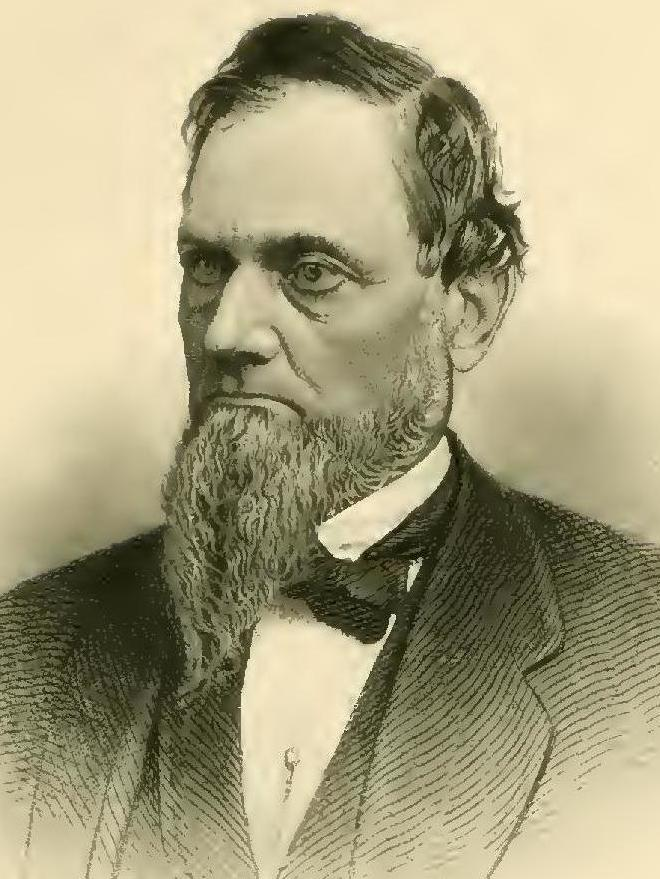

Candidate	Edward W. Harrington	Alonzo Smith
Mayor before election
Alonzo Smith
Elected mayor
Edward W. Harrington

The 1858 Manchester, New Hampshire, mayoral election was held to elect the mayor of Manchester, New Hampshire. It saw the election of Edward W. Harrington, who unseated incumbent mayor Alonzo Smith.

== 1859 ==
1859 Manchester, New Hampshire, mayoral election
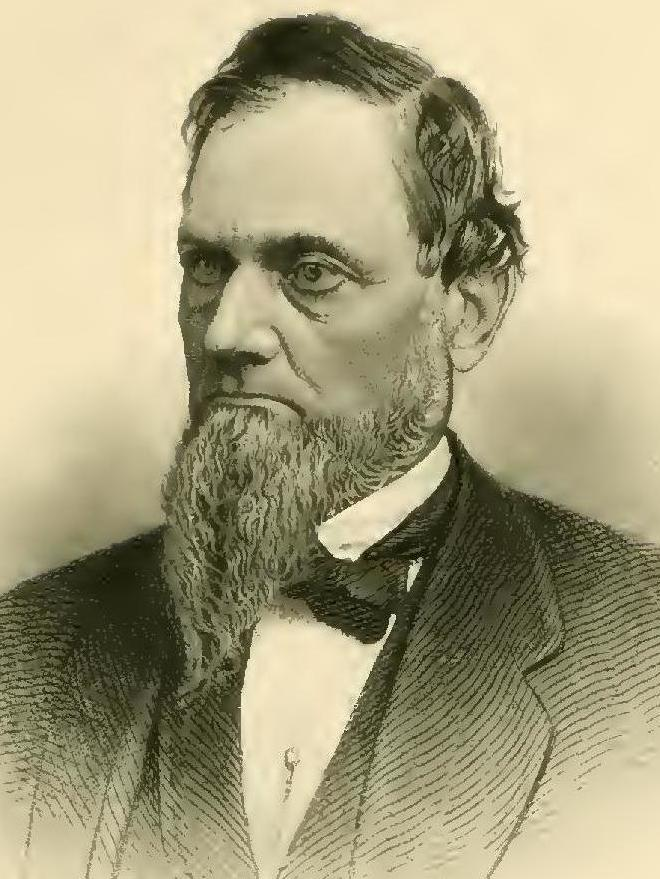

Candidate	Edward W. Harrington	Bradbury Cilley
Mayor before election
Edward W. Harrington
Elected mayor
Edward W. Harrington

The 1859 Manchester, New Hampshire, mayoral election was held to elect the mayor of Manchester, New Hampshire. It saw the reelection of Edward W. Harrington, who defeated challenger Bradbury Cilley.

== 1860 ==
1860 Manchester, New Hampshire, mayoral election
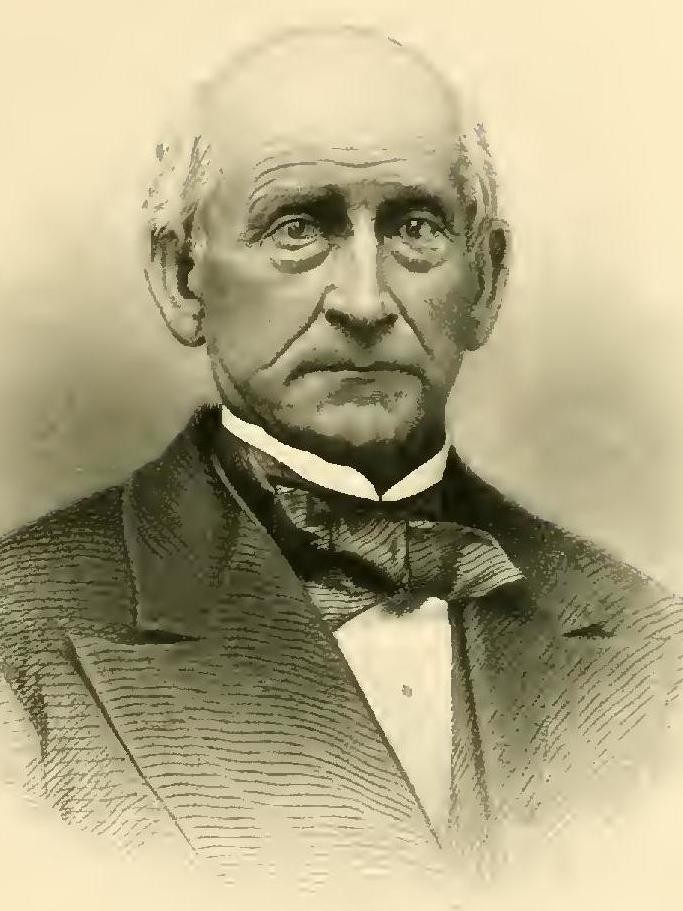

Candidate	David A. Bunton	Bradbury Cilley
Mayor before election
Edward W. Harrington
Elected mayor
David A. Bunton
Republican

The 1860 Manchester, New Hampshire, mayoral election was held to elect the mayor of Manchester, New Hampshire. It saw the election of David A. Bunton, who defeated Bradbury Cilley.

== 1861 ==
1861 Manchester, New Hampshire, mayoral election
Candidate
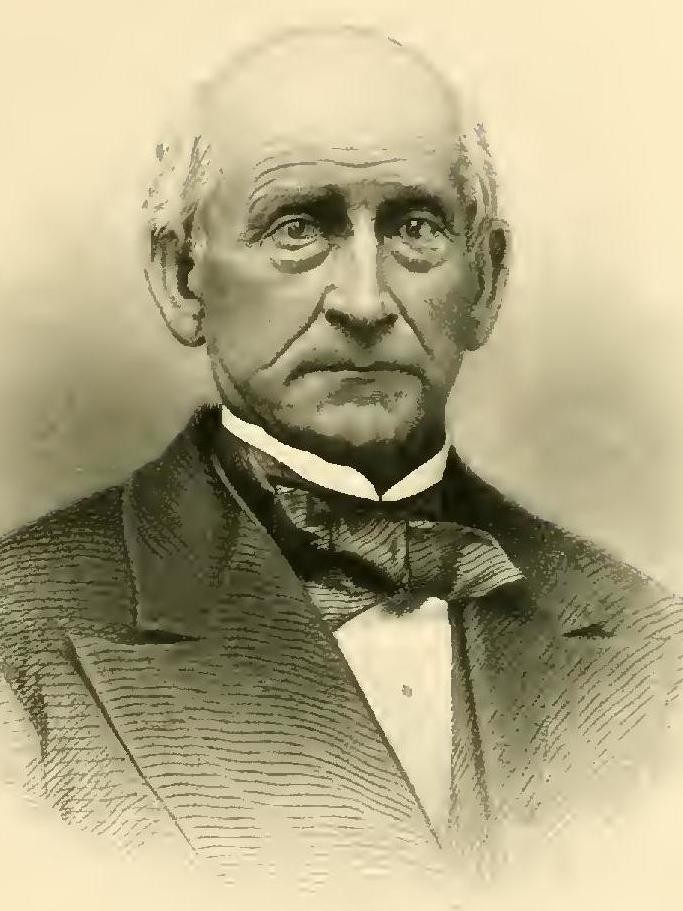
David A. Bunton
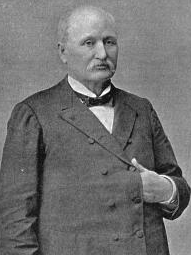
James A. Weston
Mayor before election
David A. Bunton
Republican
Elected mayor
David A. Bunton
Republican

The 1861 Manchester, New Hampshire, mayoral election was held to elect the mayor of Manchester, New Hampshire. It saw the reelection of David A. Bunton, who defeated challenger James A. Weston.

== 1862 ==
1862 Manchester, New Hampshire, mayoral election

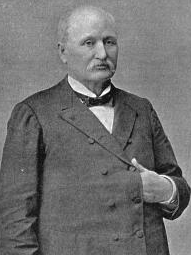
Candidate	Theodore T. Abbott	James A. Weston
Mayor before election
David A. Bunton
Republican
Elected mayor
Theodore T. Abbott
American

The 1862 Manchester, New Hampshire, mayoral election was held to elect the mayor of Manchester, New Hampshire. It saw the reelection of Theodore T. Abbott to a third nonconsecutive term. Abbott defeated Theodore T. Abbott.

== 1863 ==
1863 Manchester, New Hampshire, mayoral election
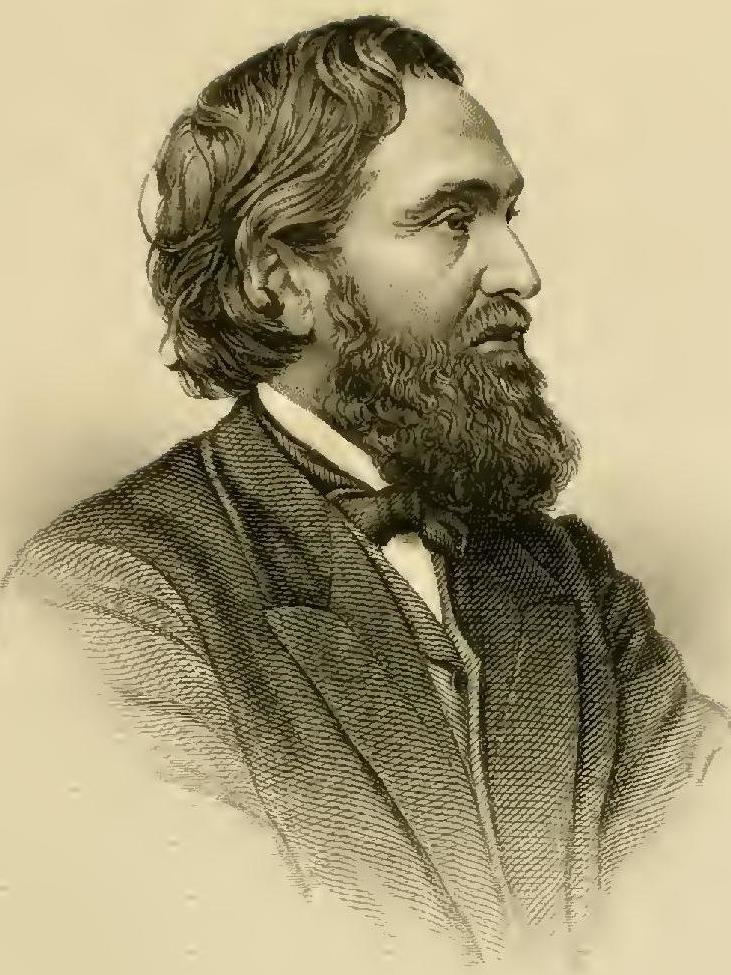
Candidate	Frederick Smyth
Mayor before election
Theodore T. Abbott
American
Elected mayor
Frederick Smyth
Republican

The 1863 Manchester, New Hampshire, mayoral election was held to elect the mayor of Manchester, New Hampshire. It saw the election of Frederick Smyth to a fourth nonconsecutive term, making him the first mayor of the city to be elected to a fourth term. Smyth was elected nearly unanimously, with the remainder of the vote being a scattering of write-in votes, with no single individual receiving more than five write-in votes.

== 1864 ==
1864 Manchester, New Hampshire, mayoral election
Candidate	Darwin J. Daniels	Joseph Kidder
Mayor before election
Frederick Smyth
Republican
Elected mayor
Darwin J. Daniels

The 1864 Manchester, New Hampshire, mayoral election was held to elect the mayor of Manchester, New Hampshire. It saw the election of Darwin J. Daniels, who defeated Joseph Kidder.

== 1865 ==
1865 Manchester, New Hampshire, mayoral election
- August 1865
Candidate
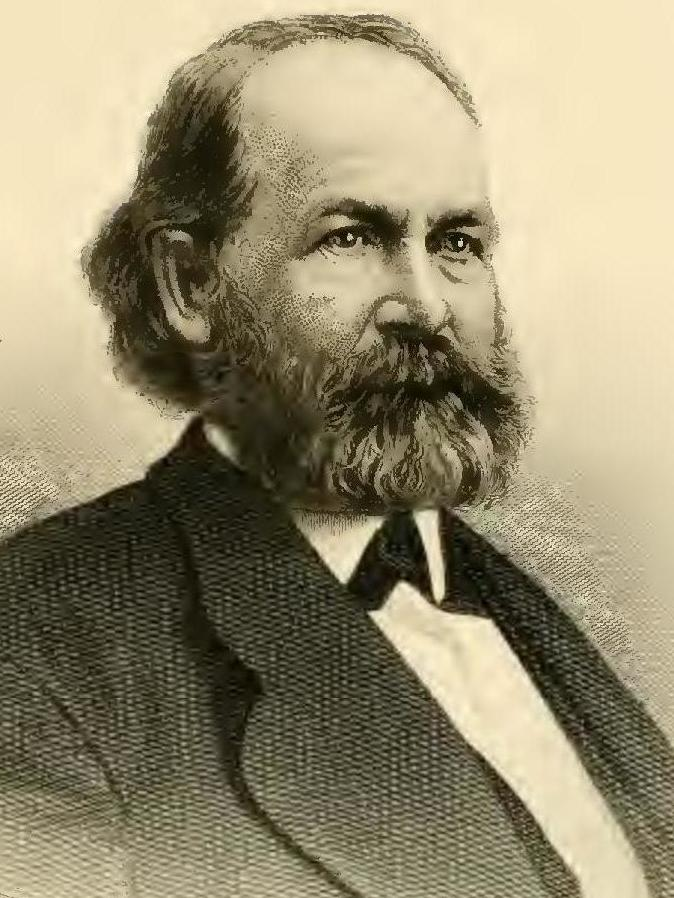
John Hosley
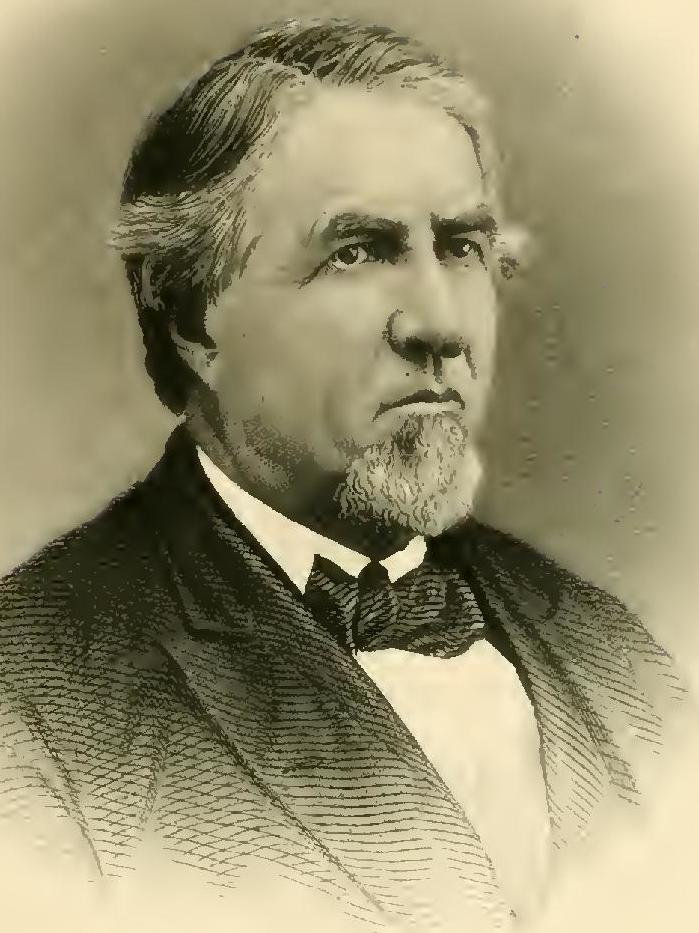
Joseph B. Clark
Mayor before election
F.W. Harrington (acting)
Elected mayor
John Holsey

The 1865 Manchester, New Hampshire, mayoral election was held in August 1865 to elect the mayor of Manchester, New Hampshire. It was held in August after the death in office of mayor Darwin J. Daniels. It saw the election of John Hosley, who defeated Joseph B. Clark.

== 1866 ==
1866 Manchester, New Hampshire, mayoral election
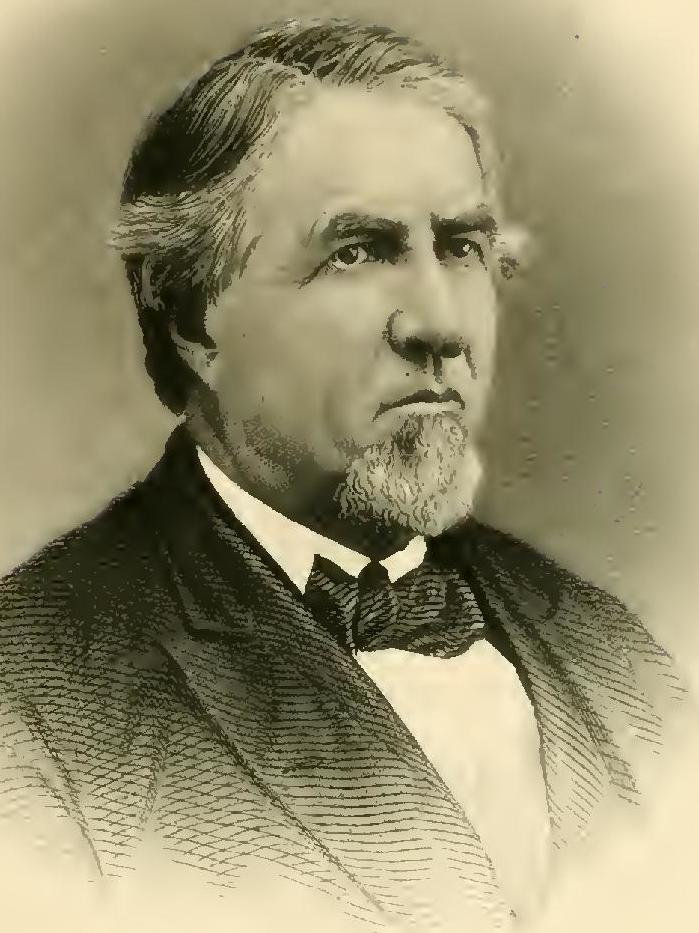

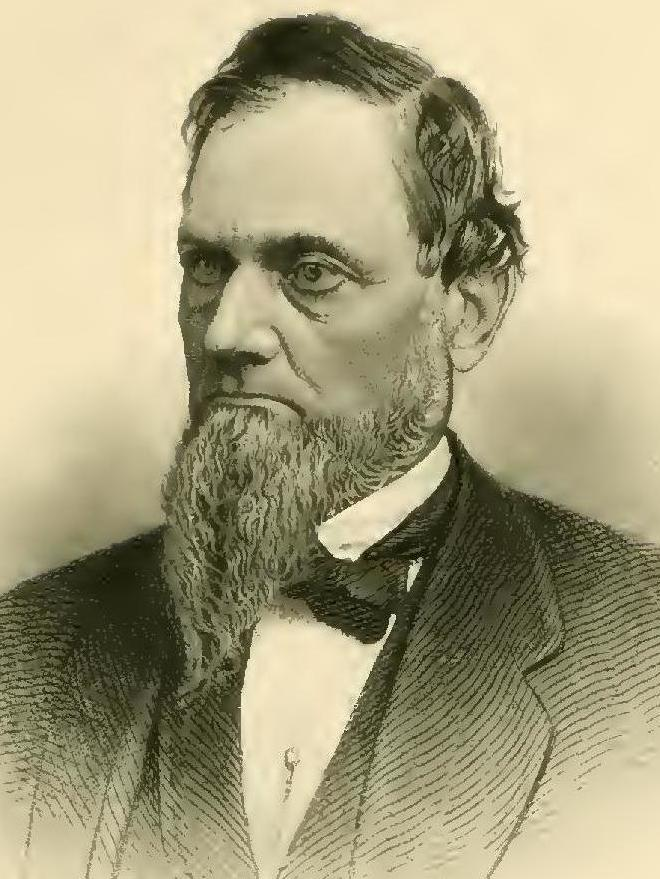
Candidate	Joseph B. Clark	Edward W. Harrington
Party	Republican
Mayor before election
John Holsey
Elected mayor
Joseph B. Clark
Republican

The 1866 Manchester, New Hampshire, mayoral election was held to elect the mayor of Manchester, New Hampshire. It saw the election of Joseph B. Clark, who defeated former mayor Edward W. Harrington.

== 1867 ==
1867 Manchester, New Hampshire, mayoral election
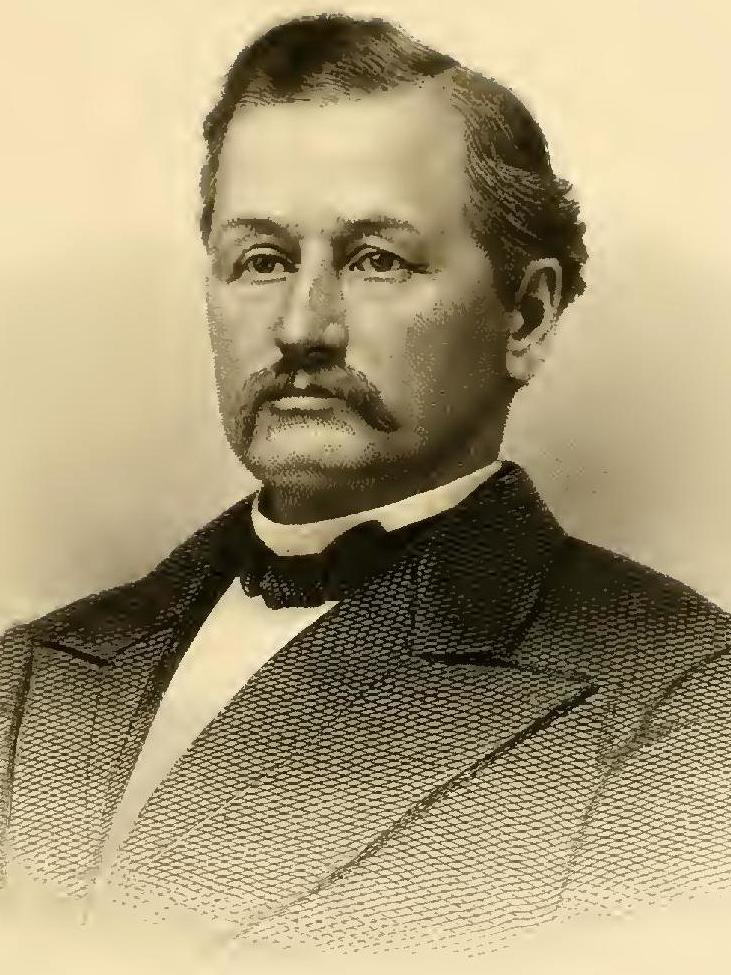

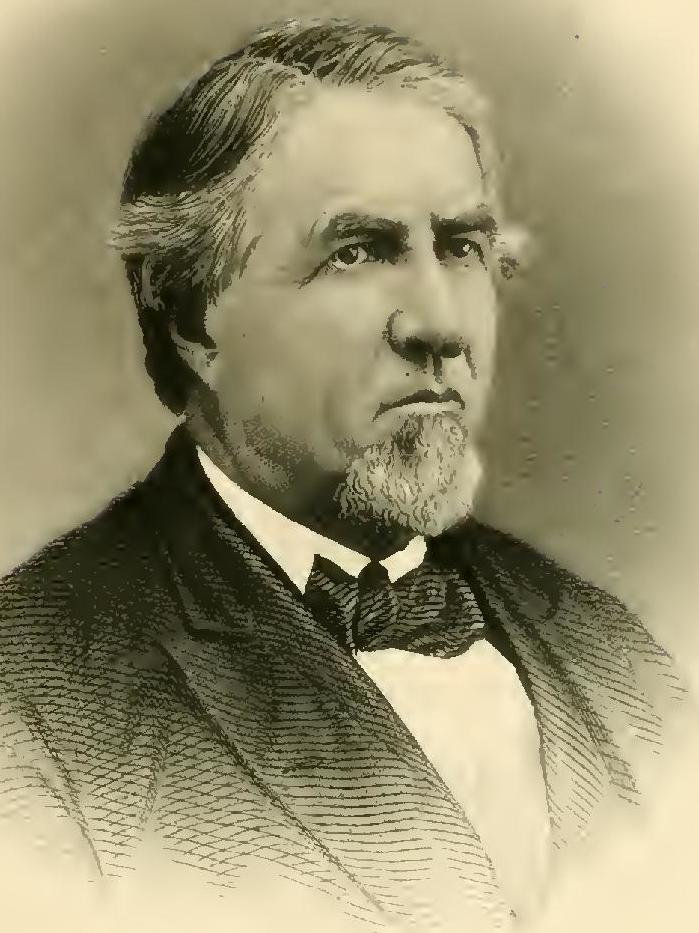
Candidate	James A. Weston	Joseph B. Clark
Party	Democratic	Republican
Mayor before election
Joseph B. Clark
Republican
Elected mayor
James A. Weston
Democratic

The 1867 Manchester, New Hampshire, mayoral election was held on December 11, 1867, to elect the mayor of Manchester, New Hampshire. It saw the election of Democrat James A. Weston, who unseated incumbent Republican Joseph B. Clark.

The victory coincided with many other American cities seeing Democratic success in their mayoral elections held in 1867. By the standards of the Reconstruction era, 1867 (an off-year) saw a particularly strong year of election results for the Democratic Party.

== 1868 ==
1868 Manchester, New Hampshire, mayoral election

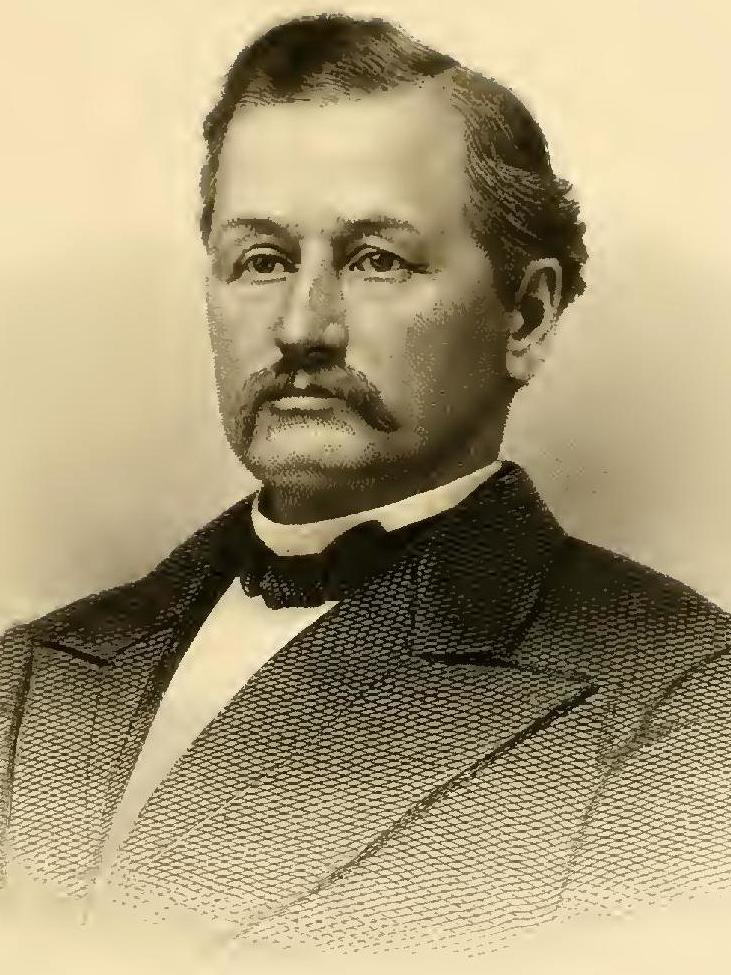
Candidate	Isaac W. Smith	James A. Weston
Party	Republican	Democratic
Mayor before election
James A. Weston
Democratic
Elected mayor
Isaac W. Smith
Republican

The 1868 Manchester, New Hampshire, mayoral election was held to elect the mayor of Manchester, New Hampshire. It saw the election of Isaac W. Smith, who unseated incumbent mayor James A. Weston.

== 1869 ==
1869 Manchester, New Hampshire, mayoral election
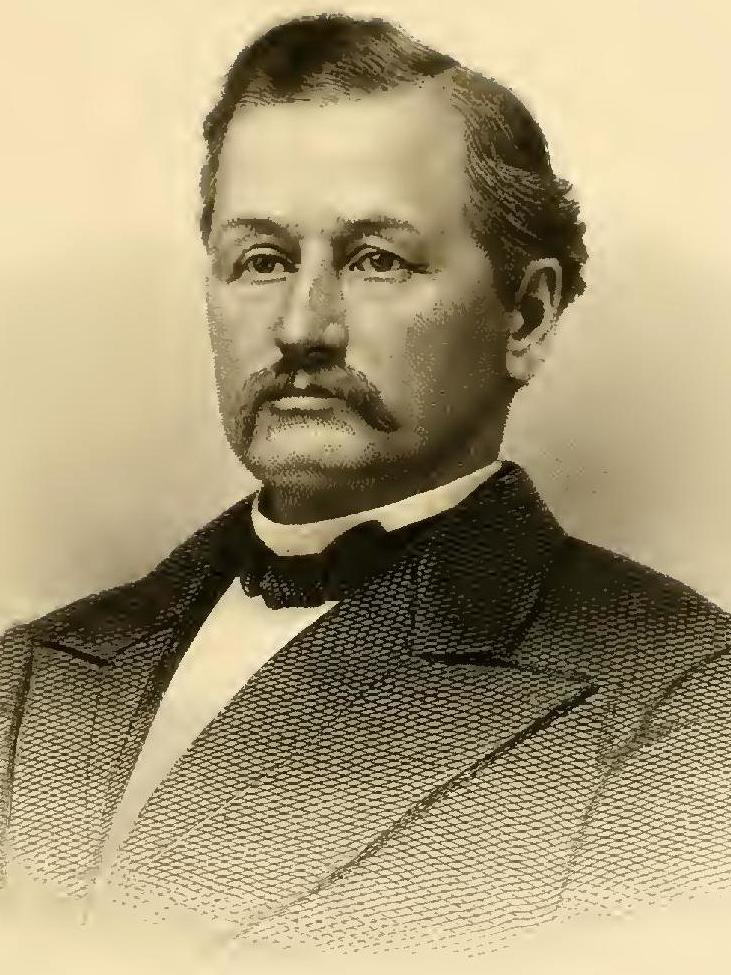

Candidate	James A. Weston	Isaac W. Smith
Party	Democratic	Republican
Mayor before election
Isaac W. Smith
Republican
Elected mayor
James A. Weston
Democratic

The 1869 Manchester, New Hampshire, mayoral election was held to elect the mayor of Manchester, New Hampshire. It saw the election of James A. Weston, who was elected to a second nonconsecutive term by unseating incumbent mayor Isaac W. Smith.

== 1870 ==
1870 Manchester, New Hampshire, mayoral election
Mayor before election
James A. Weston
Democratic
Elected mayor
James A. Weston
Democratic

The 1870 Manchester, New Hampshire, mayoral election was held to elect the mayor of Manchester, New Hampshire. It saw the reelection of James A. Weston to a third overall term, defeating Peter Chandler and Andrew C. Wallace.

== 1871 ==
1871 Manchester, New Hampshire, mayoral election
Candidate
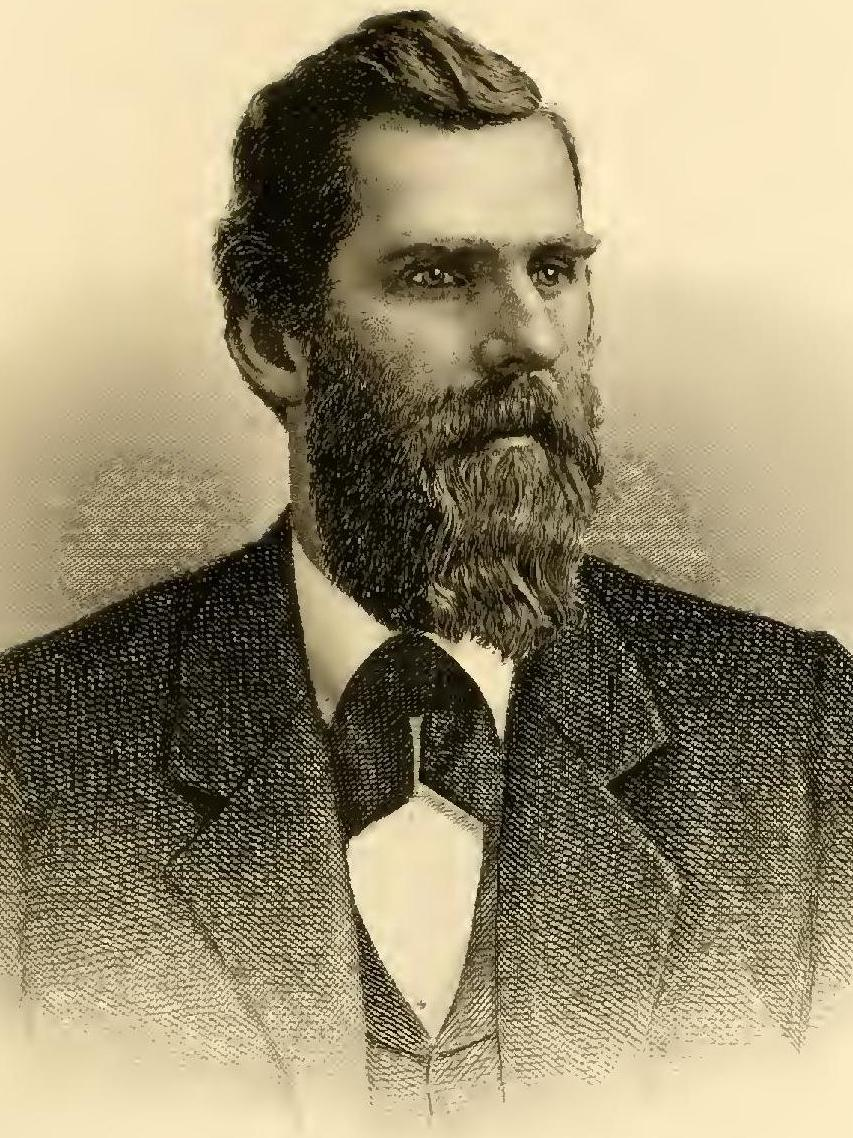
Person Colby Cheney
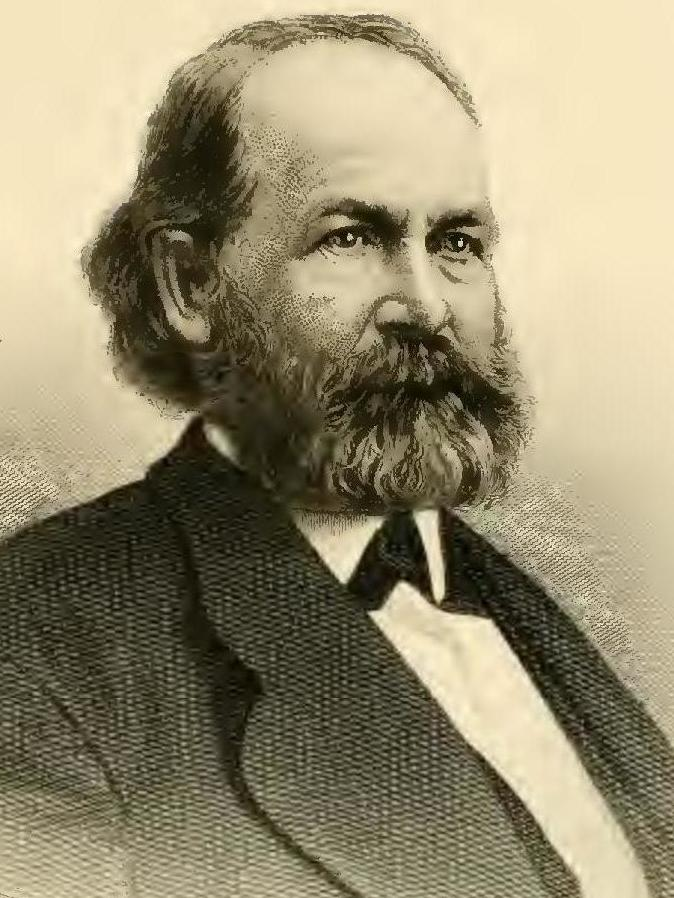
John Holsey
Mayor before election
James A. Weston
Democratic
Elected mayor
Person Colby Cheney
Republican

The 1871 Manchester, New Hampshire, mayoral election was held to elect the mayor of Manchester, New Hampshire. It saw the election of Person Colby Cheney, who defeated former mayor John Holsey.

== 1872 ==
1872 Manchester, New Hampshire, mayoral election
- December 10, 1872
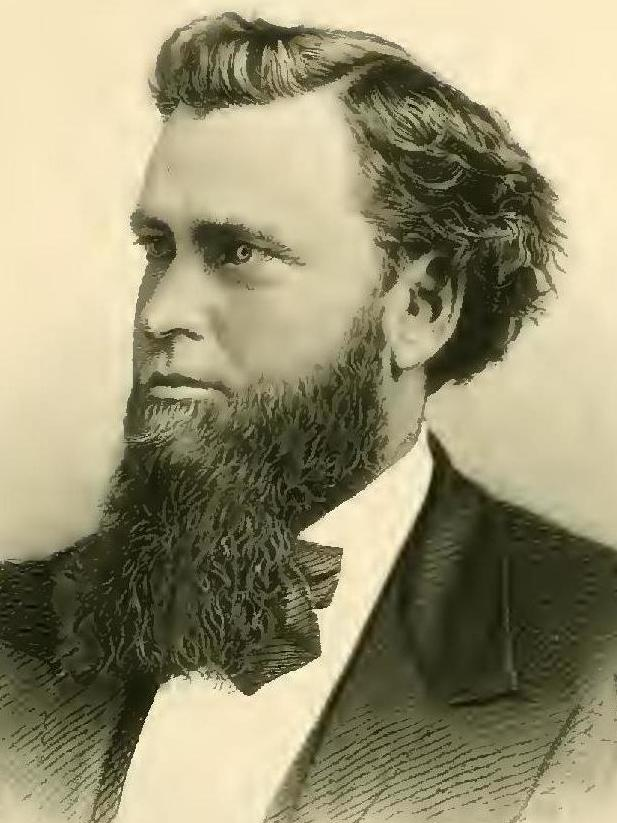

Candidate	Charles H. Bartlett	Joseph Kidder
Mayor before election
Person Colby Cheney
Republican
Elected mayor
Charles H. Bartlett

The 1872 Manchester, New Hampshire, mayoral election was held on December 10, 1872, to elect the mayor of Manchester, New Hampshire. It saw the election of Charles H. Bartlett, who defeated Joseph Kidder.

== 1873 ==
1873 Manchester, New Hampshire, mayoral election
Mayor before election
John P. Newell
Elected mayor
James A. Weston
Democratic

The 1873 Manchester, New Hampshire, mayoral election was held to elect the mayor of Manchester, New Hampshire. It saw the election of James A. Weston to a second nonconsecutive term. Weston defeated Charles Kenniston and incumbent mayor John P. Newell (who had been appointed by the city's aldermen and Common Council after the resignation of Person C. Cheney).

== 1875 ==
1875 Manchester, New Hampshire, mayoral election
Mayor before election
James A. Weston
Democratic
Elected mayor
Alpheus Gay

The 1875 Manchester, New Hampshire, mayoral election was held to elect the mayor of Manchester, New Hampshire. It saw the election of Alpheus Gay, who defeated Ira Cross and Charles Kennison.

== 1876 ==
1876 Manchester, New Hampshire, mayoral election
Candidate	Ira Cross	Alpheus Gay
Mayor before election
Alpheus Gay
Elected mayor
Ira Cross

The 1876 Manchester, New Hampshire, mayoral election was held to elect the mayor of Manchester, New Hampshire. It saw the election of Ira Cross, who defeated incumbent mayor Alpheus Gay.

== 1877 ==
1877 Manchester, New Hampshire, mayoral election
Mayor before election
Ira Cross
Elected mayor
Ira Cross

The 1877 Manchester, New Hampshire, mayoral election was held to elect the mayor of Manchester, New Hampshire. It saw the reelection of Ira Cross, who defeated Ezra W. Bartlett and former mayor Alpheus Gay.

== 1878 (March) ==
March 1878 Manchester, New Hampshire, mayoral election
Mayor before election
Ira Cross
Elected mayor
John L. Kelly

The March 1878 Manchester, New Hampshire, mayoral election was held to elect the mayor of Manchester, New Hampshire. It saw the election of John L. Kelly, who defeated Richard Goodwin and former mayor Alpheus Gay.

== 1878 (November) ==
November 1878 Manchester, New Hampshire, mayoral election
Candidate	John L. Kelly	Andrew C. Wallace
Mayor before election
John L. Kelly
Elected mayor
John L. Kelly

The November 1878 Manchester, New Hampshire, mayoral election was held to elect the mayor of Manchester, New Hampshire. It saw the reelection of John L. Kelly, who defeated Andrew C. Wallace.

== 1880 ==
1880 Manchester, New Hampshire, mayoral election
Candidate	Horace B. Putnam	Frank Dowst
Mayor before election
John L. Kelly
Elected mayor
Horace B. Putnam

The 1880 Manchester, New Hampshire, mayoral election was held to elect the mayor of Manchester, New Hampshire. It saw the election of Horace B. Putnam, who defeated Frank Dowst.

This was the first election after the city's mayoral terms were extended from one-year to two-years.

== 1882 ==
1882 Manchester, New Hampshire, mayoral election
Candidate	Horace B. Putnam	Alpheus Gay
Mayor before election
Horace B. Putnam
Elected mayor
Horace B. Putnam

The 1882 Manchester, New Hampshire, mayoral election was held to elect the mayor of Manchester, New Hampshire. It saw the reelection of Horace B. Putnam, who defeated former mayor Alpheus Gay.

== 1884 ==
1884 Manchester, New Hampshire, mayoral election
Mayor before election
Horace B. Putnam
Elected mayor
George H. Stearns

The 1884 Manchester, New Hampshire, mayoral election was held to elect the mayor of Manchester, New Hampshire. It saw the election of George H. Stearns, who defeated Joseph Kidder and Lewis Simons.

== 1886 ==
1886 Manchester, New Hampshire, mayoral election
Mayor before election
George H. Stearns
Elected mayor
John Hosley

The 1886 Manchester, New Hampshire, mayoral election was held to elect the mayor of Manchester, New Hampshire. It saw the election of John Holsey to a second nonconsecutive term. Holsey defeated Albert Tasker and incumbent mayor George H. Stearns.

== 1888 ==
1888 Manchester, New Hampshire, mayoral election
Mayor before election
John Hosley
Elected mayor
David B. Varney

The 1888 Manchester, New Hampshire, mayoral election was held to elect the mayor of Manchester, New Hampshire. It saw the election of David B. Varney, who defeated William Corey and Augustus Stevens.

== 1890 ==
1890 Manchester, New Hampshire, mayoral election
Mayor before election
David B. Varney
Elected mayor
Edgar J. Knowlton

The 1890 Manchester, New Hampshire, mayoral election was held to elect the mayor of Manchester, New Hampshire. It saw the election of Edgar J. Knowlton, who defeated Thomas W. Lane and Augustus Stevens.

== 1892 ==
1892 Manchester, New Hampshire, mayoral election
Mayor before election
Edgar J. Knowlton
Elected mayor
Edgar J. Knowlton

The 1892 Manchester, New Hampshire, mayoral election was held to elect the mayor of Manchester, New Hampshire. It saw the reelection of Edgar J. Knowlton, who defeated John C. Bickford and Augustus Stevens.

== 1894 ==
1894 Manchester, New Hampshire, mayoral election
Mayor before election
vacant
Elected mayor
William C. Clarke
Republican

The 1894 Manchester, New Hampshire, mayoral election was held to elect the mayor of Manchester, New Hampshire. It saw the election of Republican candidate William C. Clarke, who defeated Democratic candidate Charles C. Hayes, People's candidate Sumner F. Claflin, and Prohibition candidate John Gillis.

== 1896 ==
1896 Manchester, New Hampshire, mayoral election
Mayor before election
William C. Clarke
Republican
Elected mayor
William C. Clarke
Republican

The 1896 Manchester, New Hampshire, mayoral election was held to elect the mayor of Manchester, New Hampshire. It saw the reelection of William C. Clarke, who defeated John Bickford, Sumner F. Claflin, and Charles C. Hayes.

== 1898 ==
1898 Manchester, New Hampshire, mayoral election
Mayor before election
William C. Clarke
Republican
Elected mayor
William C. Clarke
Republican

The 1898 Manchester, New Hampshire, mayoral election was held to elect the mayor of Manchester, New Hampshire. It saw the reelection of William C. Clarke to a third consecutive term. Clarke defeated Charles C. Hayes and Earle Payne.

== 1900 ==
1900 Manchester, New Hampshire, mayoral election
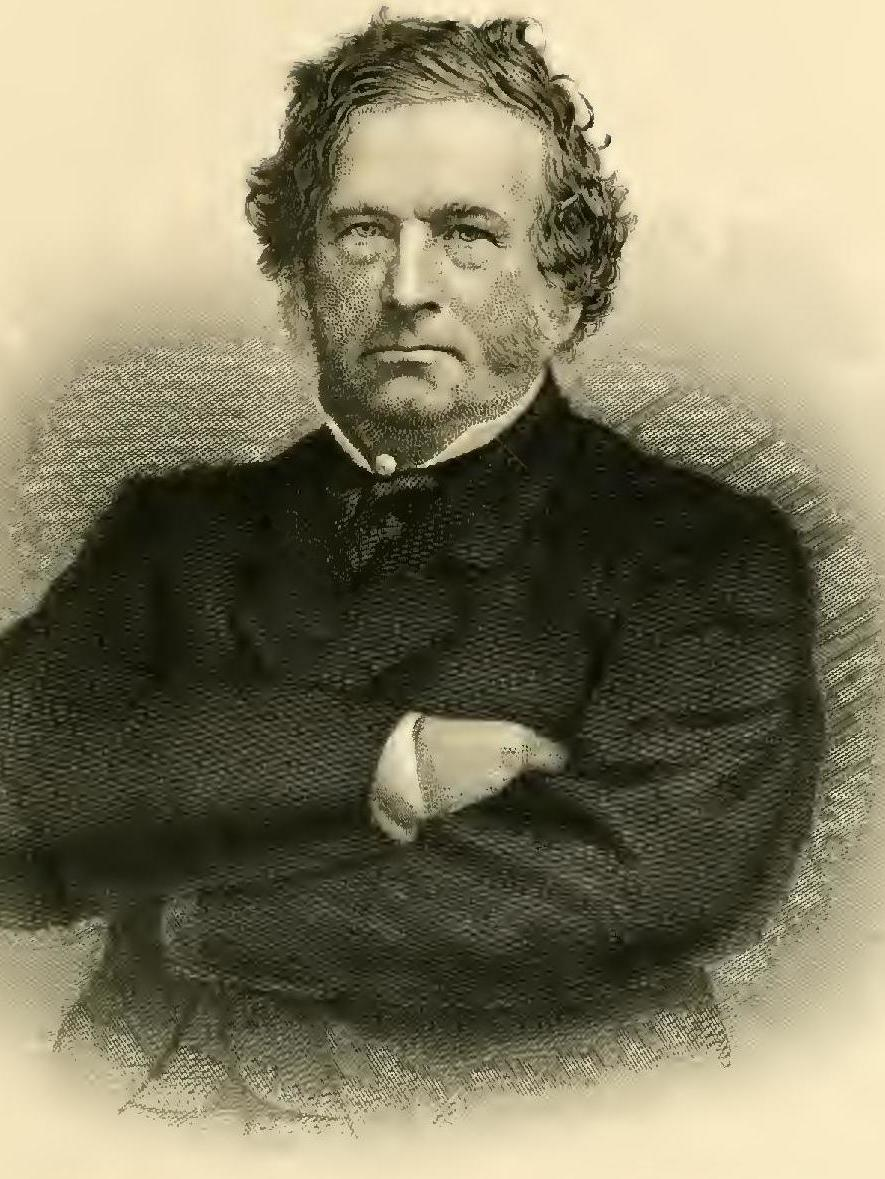

Candidate	William C. Clarke	James Sullivan
Party	Republican	Democratic
Mayor before election
William C. Clarke
Republican
Elected mayor
William C. Clarke
Republican

The 1900 Manchester, New Hampshire, mayoral election was held to elect the mayor of Manchester, New Hampshire. It saw the reelection of Republican incumbent William C. Clarke to a fourth consecutive term. Clarke defeated Democratic candidate James Sullivan. Clarke was the second mayor of the city to win election to a fourth term (after Frederick Smyth did so in 1863), and the first to win a fourth consecutive term.
