= Manchester VA Medical Center =

VAMC Manchester
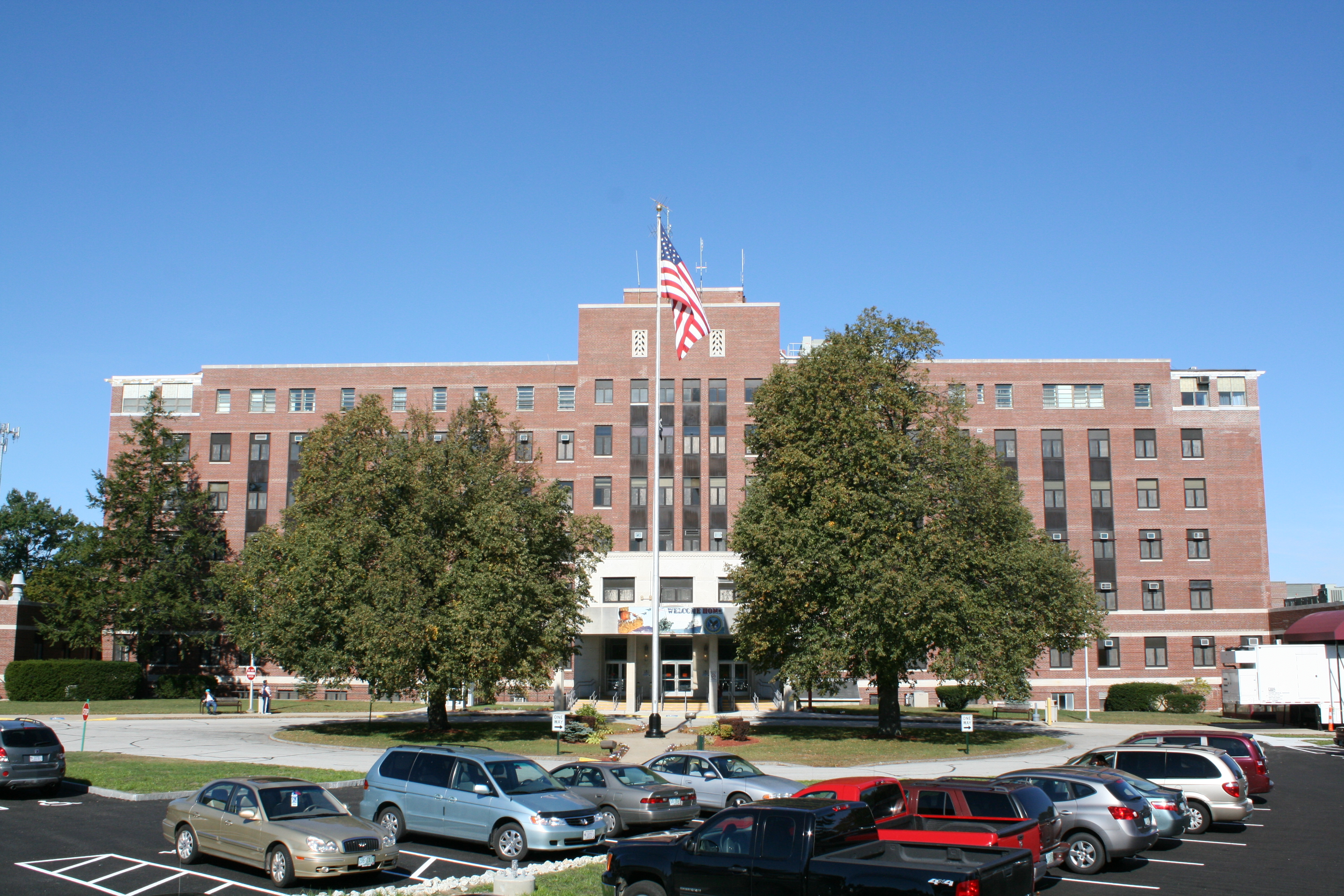

Geography
- Location: 718 Smyth Road, Manchester, New Hampshire, United States
- Coordinates: 43°00′47″N 77°24′40″W

Organization
- Funding: Government hospital
- Type: Rehabilitation
- Network: VA New England Healthcare System

Services
- Beds: 90

Links
- Website: www.manchester.va.gov
- Lists: Hospitals in New Hampshire

The Manchester VA Medical Center is a medical facility for US military veterans located in Manchester, New Hampshire. It is part of the VA New England Healthcare System, and operates under the Department of Veterans Affairs to provide healthcare to veterans who are residents of New Hampshire. Built in 1950, it is the only Veteran's Affairs medical facility in the state, but is no longer a full-service hospital.

== History ==
Plans for establishing a veterans medical center in New Hampshire and seeking legislative approval and funding began shortly after World War I. Final approval did not come until 1945. The following year, the US government acquired a parcel of land for the new center from the estate of Frederick Smyth, a former New Hampshire governor. The land included Smyth Tower, built by Frederick Smyth in 1888 and a designated National Historic Site. Construction began in 1948, and the hospital was officially opened on 2 July 1950. Over the next ten years it treated over 23,000 patients.

In the late 1960s, the center joined with Harvard Medical School to provide surgical training and also provided residencies for graduates of Dartmouth Medical School. The aging veteran population in New Hampshire led to the addition of a residential nursing home and an ambulatory care wing in the late 1970s. Over the years several medical research centers were established, including one for post-traumatic stress disorder. The center originally had a 28-bed full-service hospital. Starting in 1999 the center eliminated its inpatient care services, and the center concentrated on urgent and primary care and on ambulatory and outpatient services. Following the closure, patients requiring a full-service hospital were sent to VA hospitals in Boston, Massachusetts, and White River Junction, Vermont. The center also established in-patient treatment contracts with non-VA hospitals in New Hampshire such as Concord Hospital.

Around that time administrative problems began to arise at the hospital, similar to problems throughout the VA healthcare system that emerged in 2014. The problems included outdated and sometimes inadequately sterilized surgical instruments; failures to maintain the building, which led to a fly infestation and an inability to use a nuclear camera that was needed to monitor heart and bone health; failure to diagnose and treat a common spine condition called cervical myelopathy which left veterans in severe pain; and one man left paralyzed after suffering two strokes, which could have been prevented. The VA Choice program, created in 2014 to provide federal funding for veterans to receive medical care outside the VA system, exacerbated these problems in some ways, since that system's administrators also failed to provide timely appointments for New Hampshire veterans.

In 2017 a group of eleven staff from the center, including its retiring chief of medicine, Stewart Levenson, and the head of the center's spinal cord unit, William Kois, took their concerns about sub-standard care and conditions at the facility to the Office of the Special Counsel. They also alerted journalists at the Boston Globe, which published a lengthy article on July 15, 2017, outlining the problems which had existed for several years despite the fact that the center had been upgraded to a four-star rating by the Department of Veterans Affairs in 2016. Within hours of publication of the Boston Globe article, David Shulkin, the Secretary for Veterans Affairs, announced the removal of two of the center's top administrators as part of what he called a "top-to-bottom" review of the facility's operations. The following month Shulkin announced the establishment of a special task force to review the overall provision of medical care for New Hampshire's veterans and pledged $30 million to upgrade the Manchester VA center. Fallout from the affair led New Hampshire's congressional delegation to renew their efforts in the US Congress to re-establish a full-service veterans hospital in the state.

== Services ==
As of 2017, the Manchester VA Medical Center provided the following services:

- Urgent care
- Primary care
- Ambulatory surgery
- Specialty clinics, including mental health
- Hospital-based home care
- Long-term inpatient care in the nursing home unit
- Community acute care

Because the center's full-service hospital closed in 2001, veterans requiring inpatient acute care are referred to the Boston VA Medical Center in Massachusetts, the White River Junction VA Medical Center in Vermont, or Concord Hospital in New Hampshire. Concord Hospital is Manchester VA's contracted community hospital partner.

== See also ==
- List of Veterans Affairs medical facilities
