= Edmund Burke (New Hampshire politician) =

American lawyer, newspaper editor and politician (1809–1882)

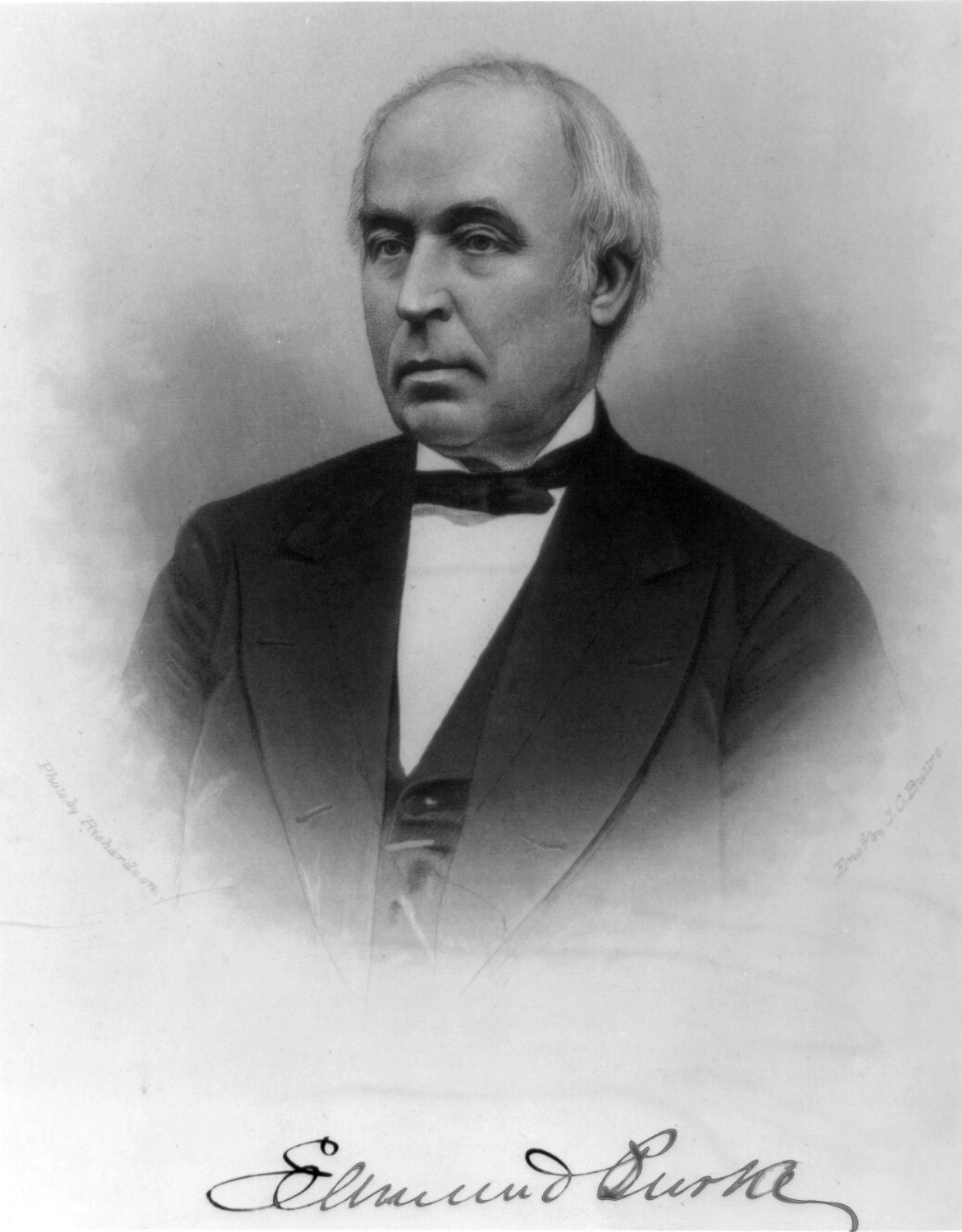

United States Commissioner of Patents
- In office May 5, 1846 – September 3, 1850
- Appointed by: James Polk
- Preceded by: Henry Leavitt Ellsworth
- Succeeded by: Thomas Ewbank

Member of the U.S. House of Representatives from New Hampshire's at-large district
- In office March 4, 1839 – March 3, 1845
- Preceded by: James Farrington
- Succeeded by: Mace Moulton

Personal details
- Born: January 23, 1809 Westminster, Vermont, U.S.
- Died: January 25, 1882 (aged 73) Newport, New Hampshire, U.S.
- Party: Democratic Party
- Spouse(s): Ann Matson Burke; Mary E Whitney Burke
- Children: Frances Matson Burke Dana
- Profession: Lawyer; Newspaper editor Politician

Military service
- Allegiance: United States of America
- Branch/service: New Hampshire Militia
- Years of service: 1837-1838
- Rank: Adjutant; Brigade inspector

Edmund Burke (January 23, 1809 – January 25, 1882) was an American lawyer, newspaper editor and politician. He served as the United States commissioner of patents and as a U.S. representative from New Hampshire in the 1840s.

== Early life and career ==
Born in Westminster, Vermont, Burke was the son of Elijah and Grace (Jeffers) Burke. He attended the public schools and studied law with Henry Adams Bellows, future Chief Justice of the New Hampshire Supreme Court. Burke was admitted to the bar in 1826. He began practicing law in Colebrook, New Hampshire before moving to Claremont, New Hampshire in 1833.

He assumed editorial management of the New Hampshire Argus, and when he moved to Newport, New Hampshire in 1834, he united the Argus with the New Hampshire Spectator of Newport. The newly created Argus and Spectator was a political newspaper. He was commissioned as an adjutant in the New Hampshire State militia in 1837 and as brigade inspector in 1838.

== Political career ==
Elected as a Democrat to the Twenty-sixth, Twenty-seventh and Twenty-eighth Congresses, Burke served as United States Representative for the state of New Hampshire from March 4, 1839, to March 3, 1845. He was not a candidate for renomination in 1844.

He was appointed Commissioner of Patents by President Polk and served from May 5, 1846, to September 3, 1850. While serving in that office, he wrote a series of articles about the tariff under the signature Bundelcund. The articles were written for The Washington Union and circulated as a pamphlet.

After leaving the patent office, he resumed the practice of law in Newport, New Hampshire. He served as delegate to the Democratic National Conventions in 1844 and 1852. In 1867, he served as delegate to the Democratic State convention and served as presiding officer. He was a member of the State board of agriculture in 1871, and was a member of the Vermont Historical Society.

== Death ==
Burke died in Newport, Sullivan County, New Hampshire on January 25, 1882 (age 73 years, 2 days). He is interred at Maple Grove Cemetery in Newport, New Hampshire.

== Personal life ==
Burke married Ann Matson on December 1, 1840. His wife was the granddaughter of Aaron Matson, US Representative from New Hampshire. They had one daughter, Frances Matson Burke. Ann died at the age of twenty-eight. Burke later married Mary Elizabeth Whitney.

U.S. House of Representatives
| Preceded by Samuel Cushman | Representative of New Hampshire; 1839-1845 | Succeeded by Mace Moulton |
