= Warren L. Lane =

American politician (1805–1861)

Hon. Warren L. Lane
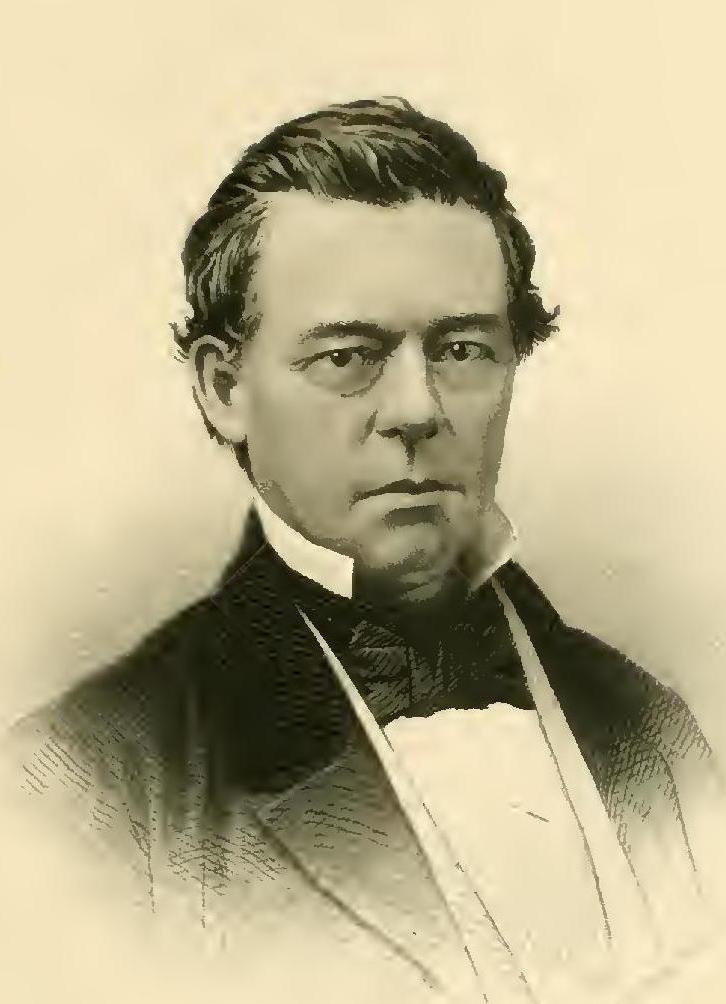

3rd Mayor of Manchester, New Hampshire
- In office October 6, 1849 – 1850
- Preceded by: Jacob F. James
- Succeeded by: Moses Fellows

Personal details
- Born: Warren Lovejoy Lane; August 31, 1805 Sanbornton, New Hampshire
- Died: March 4, 1861 (aged 55) Manchester, New Hampshire
- Resting place: Valley Cemetery
- Party: Democratic
- Spouse: Sally C. Sawyer (m. 1827)
- Children: 4

Warren Lovejoy Lane (August 31, 1805 – March 4, 1861) was an American politician who served as the third mayor of Manchester, New Hampshire.

== Early life ==
Warren Lane was born at Sanbornton, New Hampshire, the son of Daniel and Lydia (Lovejoy) Lane. He was the eldest of a family of three sons and two daughters, of whom he was the last survivor. His father died when he was quite young, leaving him the responsibility over his siblings. Lane moved to Hampstead, New Hampshire, when he was about fourteen years of age and was apprenticed to a manufacturer and tanner, working as a clerk in a country store after that. While there he married, on September 23, 1827, Miss Sally C. Sawyer, daughter of Dr. Joshua Sawyer, and they had three sons and a daughter.

== Election ==
Lane took an early interest in political matters, was often elected to the town offices and in 1841 and 1842 represented Hampstead in the popular branch of the state legislature. While a resident of that town he held a military commission from Gov. Morrill, Gov. Harvey and Gov. Harper. In 1832, he received from President Martin Van Buren the appointment of deputy United States marshal and took the census of thirteen towns in Rockingham county.

In 1842, he moved to Manchester and engaged in the West India goods trade, but in 1845, he was appointed postmaster by President James K. Polk and served four years. He had been in 1844 chairman of the board of selectmen and in 1849 was elected as the third mayor of the city by the Democratic Party on October 3, 1849, and was sworn in on October 6, 1849.

In 1850, he was the chief engineer of the fire department and the same year was appointed special justice of the police court. In 1851 he was appointed insurance commissioner by Gov. Dinsmoor, and in 1853 he was made deputy-sheriff for Hillsborough, Rockingham and Merrimack counties, holding that position till the overthrow of the Democratic party in 1855. Before he was appointed special justice of the police court his reputation was such that he was made, by consent of the parties interested, what would now be called a referee or final arbitrator, in numerous cases. His social nature was largely developed and he drew around himself a large circle of admiring friends who delighted to honor him with some position. He always filled with great acceptance the offices he held and from their number can be deduced his popularity.

== Death ==
Lane died at his home on Pine Street in Manchester on March 4, 1861.

== Notes ==
Political offices
Preceded by Jacob F. James	Mayor of Manchester, New Hampshire; October 6, 1849 – 1850	Succeeded by Moses Fellows
