= Valley Cemetery =

Cemetery in New Hampshire, US

- U.S. National Register of Historic Places
- NH State Register of Historic Places
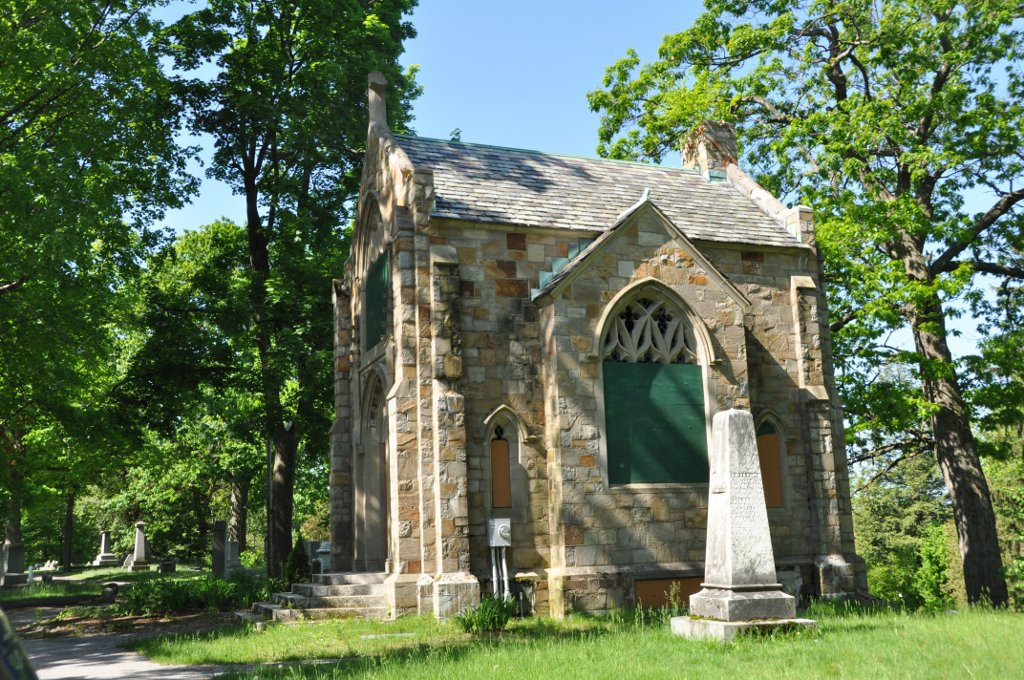
- The cemetery chapel

- Location within New Hampshire Location within the United States
- Location: Pine and Auburn streets Manchester, New Hampshire
- Coordinates: 42°59′00″N 71°27′36″W
- NRHP reference No.: 04000964

Significant dates
- Added to NRHP: September 10, 2004
- Designated NHSRHP: April 28, 2003

The Valley Cemetery (or the Valley Street Cemetery) is a public cemetery located in Manchester, New Hampshire, United States. It is bounded on the east by Pine Street, on the north by Auburn Street, on the west by Willow Street, and on the south by Valley Street, from which it derives its name. It was listed on the U.S. National Register of Historic Places in 2004, and the New Hampshire State Register of Historic Places in 2003.

== History ==
The cemetery came into existence in 1840, when the Amoskeag Manufacturing Company donated 20 acres (81,000 m^{2}) of land in downtown Manchester to the city for the purpose of creating a public burial ground. In 1841, the city created the Valley Street Cemetery. It was designed as a "garden cemetery", meant to be a place where the public could stroll along its walkways, carriage paths and bridges. In this Victorian Era, "garden cemeteries", in which not only the dead resided, but the living communed with each other and with nature, were popular. By the late 1850s, the cemetery was nearly filled, and the much larger Pine Grove Cemetery was created. That cemetery lies to the west of Calef Road and to the east of the Merrimack River.

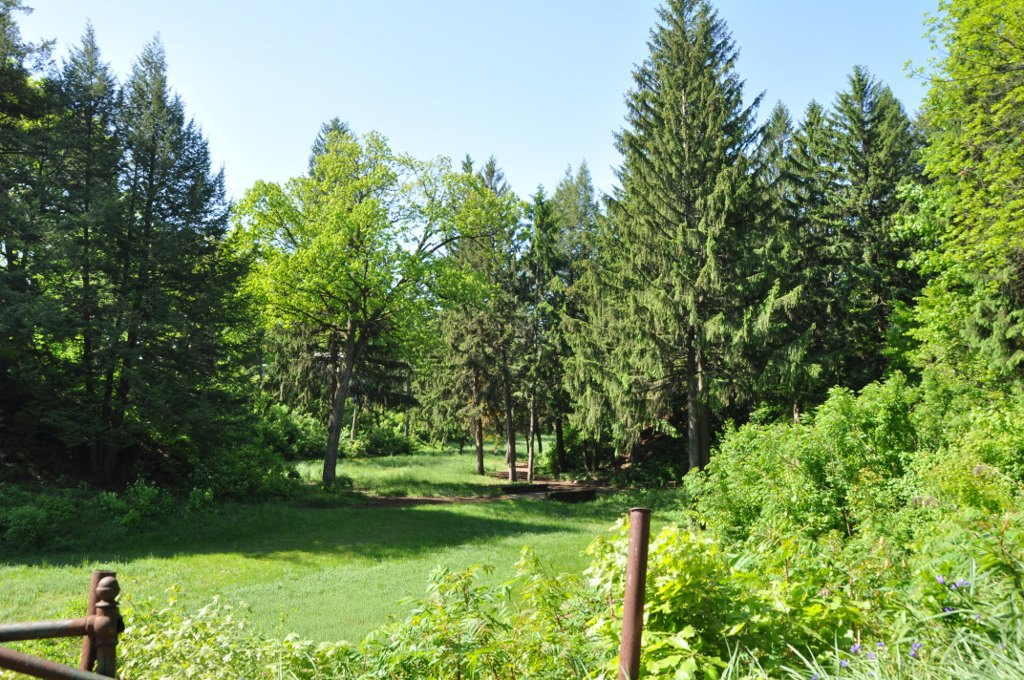
The scenic stream valley that roughly bisects the cemetery.

A receiving tomb was built at Valley Cemetery in 1888, used to store the deceased during winter when the ground was frozen. In 1907, Mrs. Hannah Currier donated gates at Auburn and Chestnut Streets in honor of her late husband, Moody Currier, who had served as governor of New Hampshire (1885–1887). A chapel in the English Gothic style was completed in 1932, replacing a wooden chapel that stood at the same site. The new building was designed by Manchester architect Chase R. Whitcher. The stone structure is now in bad repair and has been closed for many years. There are 13 private mausoleums in the cemetery.

=== Restoration efforts ===
By the end of the 20th century, the cemetery was recognized by many to be in serious decline, and its heritage as a garden cemetery had long since been forgotten by most. In 2002, the interest of Education Continuum at Southern New Hampshire University spurred the creation of Friends of the Valley Cemetery, a non-profit community organization dedicated to raising funds for the cemetery and overseeing its restoration. The group has partnered with city officials to coordinate maintenance efforts and has raised hundreds of thousands of dollars in grants for future restoration. A master plan has been written that will guide future restoration of the cemetery. The Currier Gate was restored in 2004.

Since 2003, Friends of the Valley Cemetery has hosted an annual strawberry festival in the cemetery, emphasizing its previous heritage as a "garden cemetery" that exists to be enjoyed by residents.

== Prominent burials ==
Many of the city's leaders have been buried at Valley Cemetery, including:

- Manchester mayors Jacob F. James, Warren L. Lane, Alonzo Smith, David A. Bunton, Darwin J. Daniels, Joseph B. Clark, David B. Varney and William C. Clarke
- Governor Frederick Smyth (1819–1899), whose imposing tomb is one of the jewels of the cemetery
- Governor Moody Currier (1806–1898)
- Congressman Ira Allen Eastman (1809–1881)
- Senator Daniel Clark (1809–1891)
- Abolitionist campaigner Rev. Andrew Foss
- Aretas Blood (1816–1897), owner of the Amoskeag Locomotive Works, and his wife Lavinia Kendall Blood, founder of the Manchester Women's Aid and Relief Society in 1875
- Emma Blood French (1853–1932), philanthropist and patroness of the New Hampshire Institute of Art
- Gov. Ezekiel A. Straw (1819–1882), an engineer for the Amoskeag Manufacturing Company who laid out the street grid for the city of Manchester
- Brigadier general Joseph Carter Abbott, a Union veteran of the American Civil War who remained in the American South following the war and was active in local politics there. A member of the Republican Party, he served as a U.S. senator from North Carolina.

== See also ==
- National Register of Historic Places listings in Hillsborough County, New Hampshire
