= Moses Fellows =

American mayor (1803–1879)

Honorable Moses Fellows
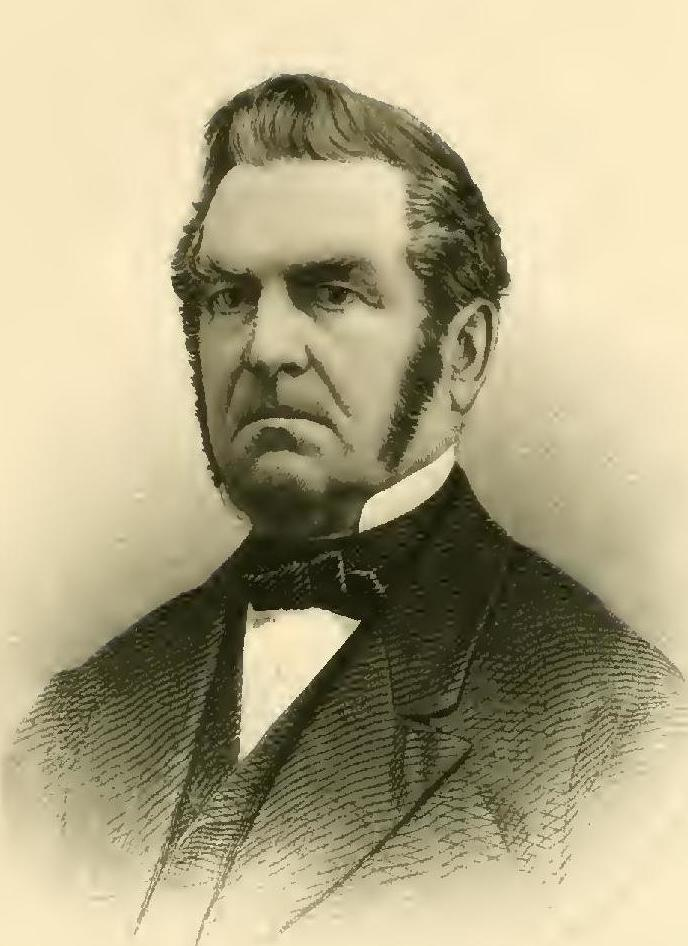

4th Mayor of Manchester, New Hampshire
- In office 1850–1851
- Preceded by: Warren L. Lane
- Succeeded by: Frederick Smyth

Member of the New Hampshire House of Representatives
- In office 1847–1848

Member of the Manchester Board of Aldermen
- In office 1846–1846

Chairman of the Manchester Board of Selectmen
- In office 1846–1846
- In office 1842–1843

Personal details
- Born: November 7, 1803 Brentwood, New Hampshire
- Died: September 25, 1879 (aged 75)

Moses Fellows (November 7, 1803 – September 25, 1879) was an American politician who served as the fourth mayor of Manchester, New Hampshire.

Fellows was born to Simon and Dorthy (Bartlett) Fellows in Brentwood, New Hampshire, on November 7, 1803.

While he lived in Brentwood, until he resigned in 1827, Fellows was a sergeant in the New Hampshire Militia.

Fellows was Chairman of the Manchester Board of Selectmen in 1842–1843 and 1846, also in 1846 a member of the Manchester board of Aldermen, and a member of the New Hampshire House of Representatives in 1847–1848.

In 1850-1851 Fellows was the mayor of Manchester, New Hampshire, having been elected in the city's 1850 and 1851 mayoral elections.

== Death ==
Fellows died on September 25, 1879.

== Notes ==
Political offices
Preceded by Warren L. Lane	Mayor of Manchester, New Hampshire; 1850–1851	Succeeded by Frederick Smyth
