= Mace Moulton =

American politician (1796–1867)

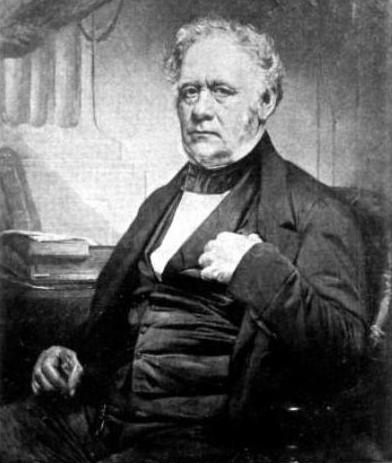
- Mace Moulton

Member of the Governor's Council
- In office 1848–1850

Member of the U.S. House of Representatives from New Hampshire's at-large district
- In office March 4, 1845 – March 3, 1847
- Preceded by: Edmund Burke
- Succeeded by: Redistricted

Sheriff of Hillsborough County
- In office 1840–1844

Personal details
- Born: May 2, 1796 Concord, New Hampshire, U.S.
- Died: May 5, 1867 (aged 71) Manchester, New Hampshire, U.S.
- Resting place: Valley Cemetery, Manchester, New Hampshire
- Party: Democratic
- Spouse: Dolly Gould Stearns Moulton
- Profession: Sheriff; Banker; Politician

Mace Moulton (May 2, 1796 – May 5, 1867) was an American sheriff, banker and Democratic politician in the U.S. State of New Hampshire. He served as a United States representative from New Hampshire and as sheriff of Hillsborough County during the 1800s.

== Early life and career ==
Moulton was born in Concord, New Hampshire, the son of Henry and Susan Stevens Moulton. He attended the public schools and trained as a carpenter's apprentice. In 1817, he was appointed deputy sheriff of Hillsborough County and moved to Bedford, New Hampshire. He served as deputy sheriff until 1840, when he was appointed sheriff. Moulton served as sheriff until he resigned in 1844.

He was elected as a Democrat to the Twenty-ninth Congress, serving from March 4, 1845 - March 3, 1847. After leaving Congress, Moulton served as sheriff again from 1847 to 1849. He was appointed a member of the Governor's council in 1848 and 1849.

In 1849, he moved to Manchester, New Hampshire where he served as director and president of the Amoskeag Savings Bank until his death in 1867. Moulton died in Manchester, New Hampshire and is interred in Valley Cemetery in Manchester.

== Personal life ==
Moulton married Dolly Gould Stearns in 1822 and they had three children: Eliza Jennie, a daughter, and two sons, Henry DeWitt and Charles Lucian Moulton. Henry DeWitt Moulton was the father of Mace Moulton, namesake of the Hon. Mace Moulton, and a civil engineer.

U.S. House of Representatives
| Preceded by Edmund Burke | Member of the U.S. House of Representatives from New Hampshire's at-large congressional district 1845-1847 | Succeeded by Seat inactive |
