= Smyth Tower =

- U.S. National Register of Historic Places
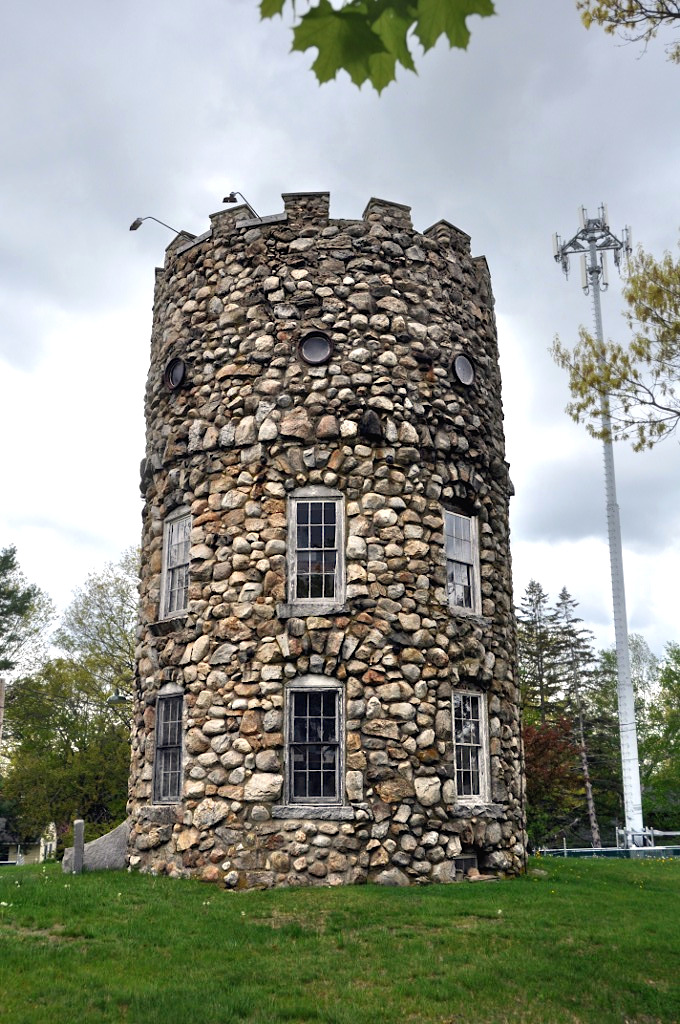

- Location within New Hampshire Location within the United States
- Location: 718 Smyth Rd., Manchester, New Hampshire
- Coordinates: 43°0′44″N 71°26′31″W
- Area: 0.5 acres (0.20 ha)
- Built: 1888
- NRHP reference No.: 78000215
- Added to NRHP: July 24, 1978

The Smyth Tower is a folly located on the grounds of the Manchester VA Medical Center at 718 Smyth Road in Manchester, New Hampshire. The fieldstone tower was built in 1888 by Frederick Smyth, and is the only surviving architectural structure related to his life. Smyth served as Governor of New Hampshire in 1865-67, and was an active promoter of veterans' issues in the post-Civil War period. The tower was listed on the National Register of Historic Places in 1978.

== Description and history ==
The Smyth Tower is located in eastern Manchester, on the west side of the Manchester VA facility on the north side of Smyth Road. The tower is 40 feet (12 m) high, with walls 2 feet (0.61 m) thick, built out of locally gathered fieldstone. Its outside diameter is 28 feet (8.5 m). It has a basement level 8 feet (2.4 m) high, and three floors topped by a crenellated parapet.

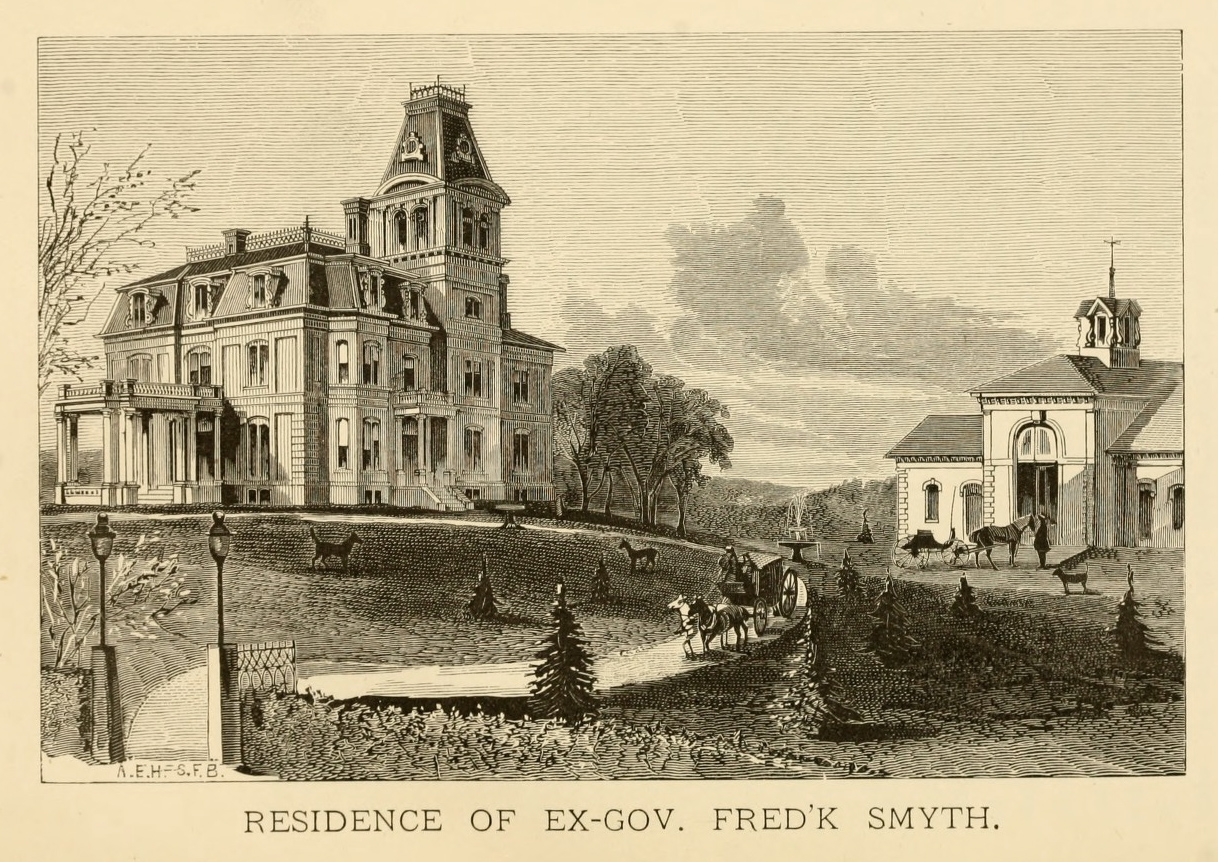
The Willows, Smyth's country house built in 1873 on a ten-acre plot delimited by Elm St., North St, River Rd. and Salmon St. It was demolished in 1969.

The tower was built in 1888 by Frederick Smyth. Smyth owned an extensive estate, part of which became the VA facility. Smyth built it as a replica of a tower he saw while visiting Scotland, and located on land that was among the earliest of his purchases in Manchester. Smyth's country house "The Willows," built near the Amoskeag Falls, no longer stands. During his tenure as governor, Smyth promoted the establishment of soldiers' homes for returning Civil War veterans, and established what is now the University of New Hampshire. The tower was given to the city by Smyth's widow in 1938. During late 1938 and early 1939, it was renovated by WPA workers for use as an amateur radio station to provide emergency radio communication capability for the city. The call sign of the station was W1LVK. During World War II, it continued to house radio communication facilities. During early construction of the VA facility, it was used as an engineering office. It was slated for demolition by the VA, and was rescued from demolition at the last minute by appeals from the family.

== See also ==
- National Register of Historic Places listings in Hillsborough County, New Hampshire
