= Frederick Smyth (New Hampshire politician) =

American politician

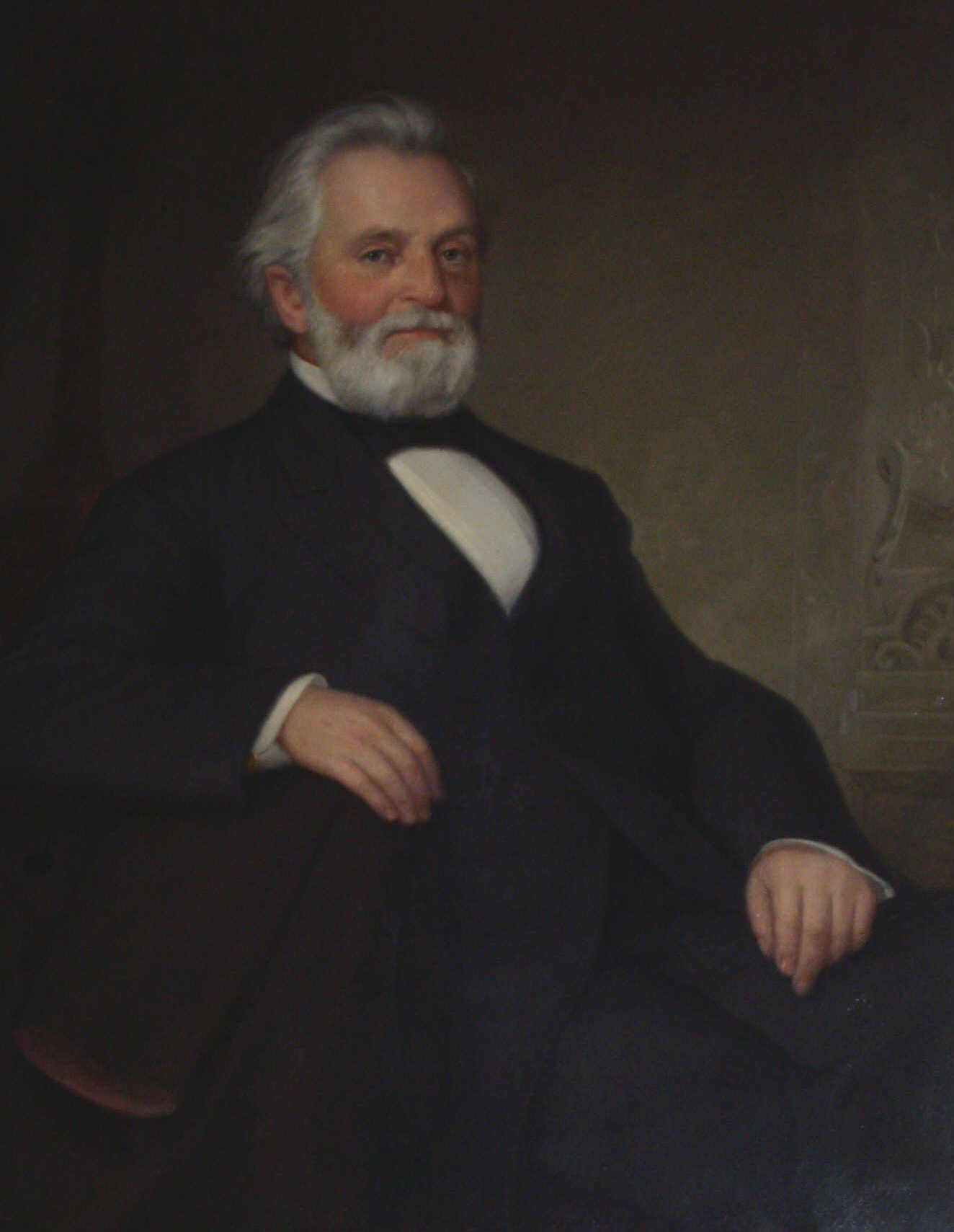

30th Governor of New Hampshire
- In office June 8, 1865 – June 6, 1867
- Preceded by: Joseph A. Gilmore
- Succeeded by: Walter Harriman

12th Mayor of Manchester, New Hampshire
- In office 1864–1865
- Preceded by: Thedore T. Abbott
- Succeeded by: Darwin J. Daniels

6th Mayor of Manchester, New Hampshire
- In office 1852–1855
- Preceded by: Moses Fellows
- Succeeded by: Theodore T. Abbott

City Clerk of Manchester, New Hampshire
- In office 1850–1852

Personal details
- Born: March 9, 1819 Candia, New Hampshire, United States
- Died: April 22, 1899 (aged 80) Hamilton, Bermuda
- Resting place: Valley Cemetery
- Party: Republican
- Spouses: Emily Lane Smith (m. 1844; died 1885) Marion Hamilton Cossar (m. 1886)

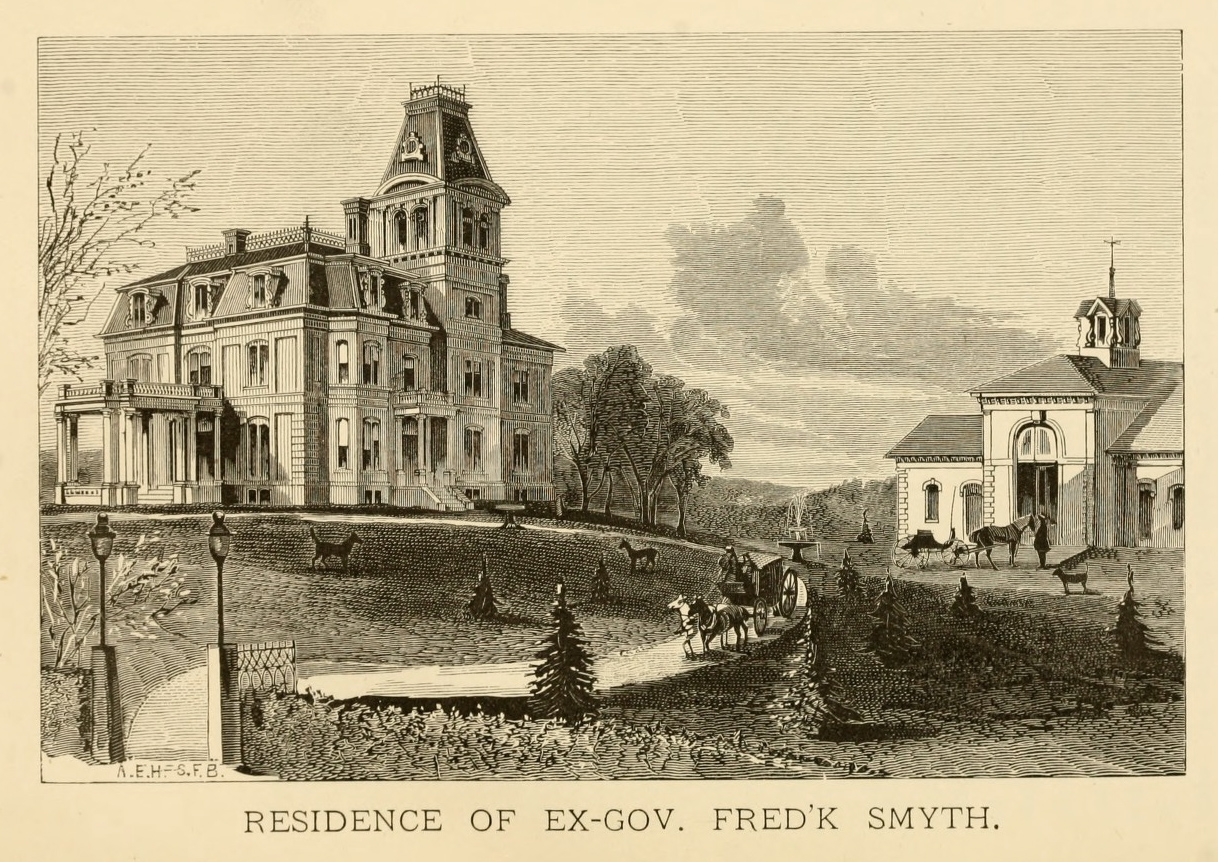
"The Willows", Smyth's country house built in 1873 on a ten acres plot delimited by Elm St., North St, River Rd. and Salmon St. It was demolished in 1969 for the construction of the New Hampshire Insurance Building (now Brady Sullivan Tower).

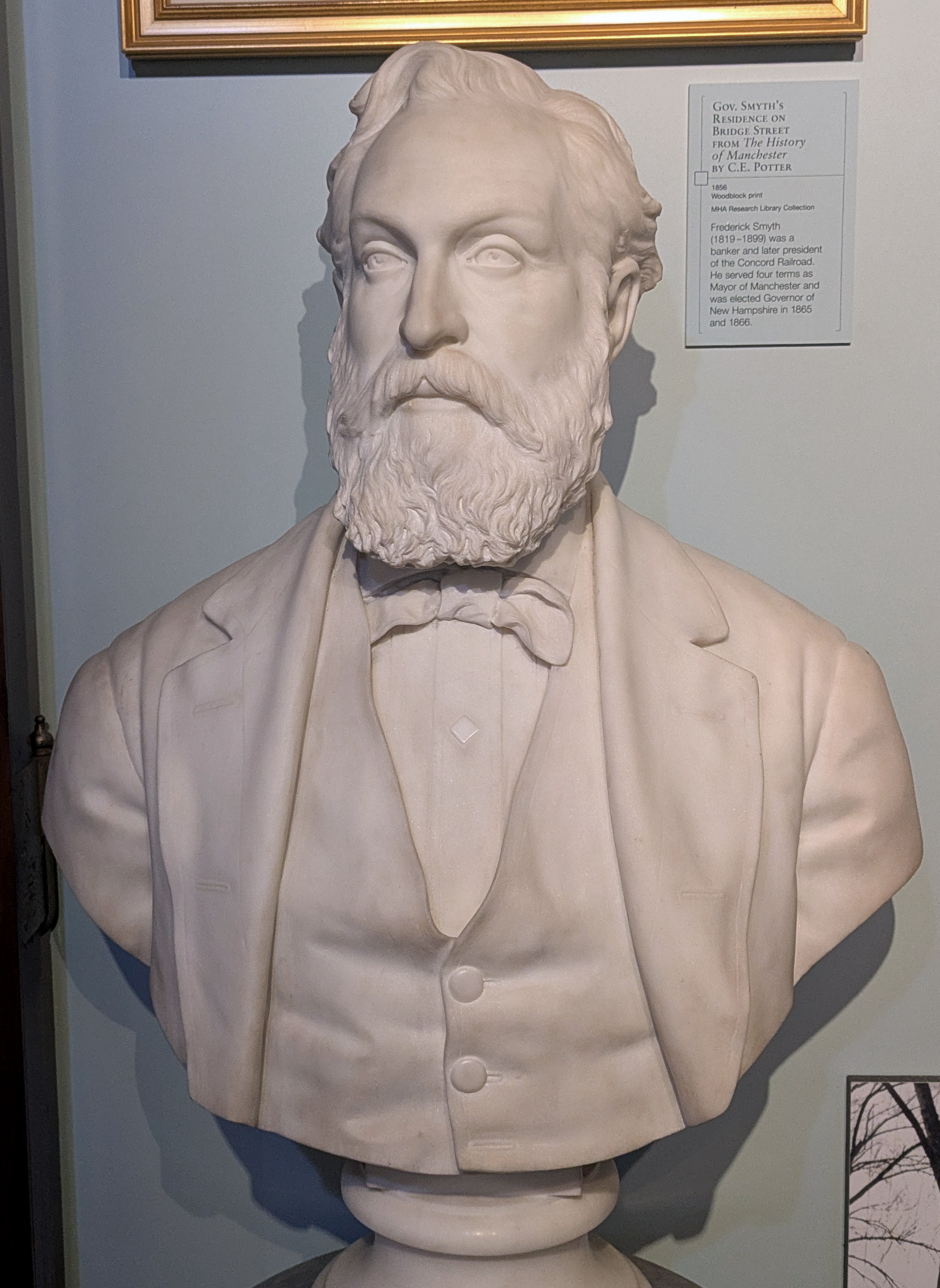
Bust of Smyth by Giulio Tadolini (1879)

Frederick Smyth (March 9, 1819 – April 22, 1899) was an American banker, railroad executive, and politician from Manchester, New Hampshire. Born in 1819 in Candia, New Hampshire, he became City Clerk of Manchester at the age of 30. A Republican, he served four terms as mayor of Manchester from 1852 to 1854 and again in 1864, and was the 30th governor of New Hampshire.

== Early life ==
Smyth was the third of five children. Around 1838, he and Thomas Wheat began running a country store in Candia under the name of Wheat and Smyth. The store was owned by Wheat's father. They soon left to attend Phillips Andover Academy in Andover, Massachusetts. Financial difficulties forced them to leave Phillips Academy after one term.

Smyth moved to Manchester, New Hampshire, where he found a job working for George Porter in Porter's general store and mercantile business. After three years, Smyth was made a partner in the business.

On December 11, 1844, Smyth married Emily Lane of Candia, daughter of John Lane and Nabby Emerson. Emily Lane Smyth died on January 14, 1885. Smyth's second wife was Marion Hamilton Cossar of Manchester, daughter of James Cossar and Jessie Finlay. They were married on February 22, 1886, at Carmichael, Lanarkshire, Scotland.

He continued to be a merchant until 1849, when he sold his share of the business following his election to the post of Manchester city clerk at the age of 30. He was reelected to that post in 1850 and 1851.

In 1852, he was elected to his first term as mayor of Manchester. He was reelected in 1853 and 1854. He was elected again to a fourth nonconsecutive term in 1863.

Many of the decisions he made as mayor remain today, including many "firsts", such as overseeing the construction of the city's first highways, the first water and sewer systems, the first sidewalks, and streetlights. He is credited with the idea to plant trees along city streets to provide shade and maintain the natural beauty of the city.

In 1857 and 1858, he was a member of the New Hampshire General Court, representing Manchester's ward 3.

He was active in the New Hampshire Agriculture Society, serving as treasurer for 10 years. He was a director in the American Agriculture Society and a vice-president of the American Pomological Society. He served as one of the commissioners on the part of the General Government of New Hampshire at the International Exhibition of 1862, in London.

When Abraham Lincoln visited the state in 1860, Smyth introduced him to a crowd as the "next president of the United States".

== As governor ==
He was an unsuccessful candidate for Governor of New Hampshire in 1860, but was elected in 1865, and again in 1866.

Smyth's terms as governor were consumed by efforts to straighten out the state's wartime finances, which were in substantial disarray because of Civil War expenditures. He borrowed $1.2 million to fund the state's war debt, and settled all state claims against the federal government on terms favorable to the state. He is credited with putting New Hampshire's credit on a sound financial footing, and "mustered out" soldiers remaining in wartime military units.

He oversaw a revision of state statutes, and was a strong supporter of passage of the Fourteenth Amendment to the United States Constitution (passed 1868), which guarantees due process and equal protection to all United States citizens. He also undertook to restore fish to certain state rivers, and he began publication of state papers.

== Founding of the University of New Hampshire ==
On July 7, 1866, during his second term as governor, Smyth signed a bill providing for the incorporation of the New Hampshire College of Agriculture and the Mechanic Arts. Smyth had advocated legislation to create the school in his inaugural address. The bill provided that the college be established as part of Dartmouth College and that it should be governed by a nine-member board of trustees.

The agricultural college was originally located in Hanover, New Hampshire. In 1893, it moved to Durham and became the University of New Hampshire in 1923.

On July 19, 1866, the trustees appointed Smyth a trustee of the New Hampshire College of Agriculture and the Mechanic Arts. He continued to serve as a trustee until October 7, 1897. At the first meeting of the board, on September 28, 1866, he was elected treasurer. He held the post until August 20, 1895, when he relinquished the post due to ill health.

On April 10, 1895, Smyth was elected president of the board. However, business commitments and declining health prevented him from ever presiding as president, even though he held the post until his term as a trustee expired in 1897.

=== The Smyth Prize ===
In addition to his service as a trustee, Smyth established and provided funds for the Smyth Prize for Writing, Reading and Elocution for students of the agricultural college. The Smyth Prizes were awarded from 1881 until 1904. After Smyth's death in 1899, the prize money came from provisions in his will and then was funded by his wife, Marion C. Smyth. Prizes ranged from $25 to $10. The essay and elocution competitions were open to the senior and middle class while the reading competition was only open to first-year students.

== Civic involvement ==
Smyth served as one of the board of managers of the National Homes for Disabled Soldiers. He was a delegate-at-large to the 1872 Republican national convention, and President Hayes appointed him honorary commissioner to the 1878 International Exposition at Paris. Smyth was a principal stockholder and president of the Concord and Montreal Railroad. He was a trustee of the New England Conservatory of Music in Boston, and served as president of the New Hampshire Orphans' Home at Franklin.

He died at his winter home in Hamilton, Bermuda, on April 22, 1899, at the age of 80. He is buried at Valley Cemetery in Manchester, New Hampshire, where his family has one of the cemetery's 13 mausoleums.

Smyth's name was honored when, in 1949, Smyth's wife Marion C. Smyth founded the Smyth Trust. The trust provides scholarships to music students in the greater Manchester area.

== See also ==
- Smyth Tower, a folly built on his Manchester estate, now on the grounds of the local VA center
- List of mayors of Manchester, New Hampshire

Party political offices
Preceded by Joseph A. Gilmore	Republican nominee for Governor of New Hampshire; 1865, 1866	Succeeded by Walter Harriman
Political offices
Preceded by Moses Fellows	Mayor of Manchester, New Hampshire; 1852–1855	Succeeded by Theodore T. Abbott
Preceded by Thedore T. Abbott	Mayor of Manchester, New Hampshire; 1864–1865	Succeeded by Darwin J. Daniels
Preceded by Joseph A. Gilmore	Governor of New Hampshire; 1865–1867	Succeeded by Walter Harriman
