= Hiram Brown =

American politician (1801–1890)

Hon. Hiram Brown
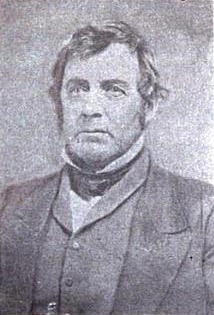

1st Mayor of Manchester, New Hampshire
- In office September 8, 1846 – May 25, 1847
- Preceded by: Board of Selectmen
- Succeeded by: Jacob F. James
- Majority: 255

Member of the Manchester Board of Selectmen
- In office 1840–1840

Personal details
- Born: January 23, 1801
- Died: September 7, 1890 (aged 89)
- Party: Whig
- Children: Mary Brown

Hiram Brown (January 23, 1801 – September 7, 1890) was an American politician who served as the first mayor of Manchester, New Hampshire.

== Background ==
Before he was mayor, Brown worked for the Amoskeag Manufacturing Company supervising the stonework used in the construction of the company's facilities.

Brown was elected in 1840 to the Manchester Board of Selectmen.

== Election and mayoralty ==
In the first city election of Manchester, New Hampshire, Brown was the Whig party candidate for mayor. In the election held on August 19, 1846, no candidate received a majority of the votes. Brown was elected mayor in the second round of the election held on September 1, 1846. Brown was sworn in as mayor at 10 A.M. on September 8, 1846, and served as mayor until his successor was sworn in on May 25, 1847.

== Later life and death ==
Brown died on September 7, 1890.

== See also ==
- List of mayors of Manchester, New Hampshire

== Notes ==
Political offices
Preceded by Board of Selectmen	Mayor of Manchester, New Hampshire; September 8, 1846 – May 25, 1847	Succeeded by Jacob F. James
