= Jacob F. James =

American politician (1817–1892)

Hon. Jacob F. James
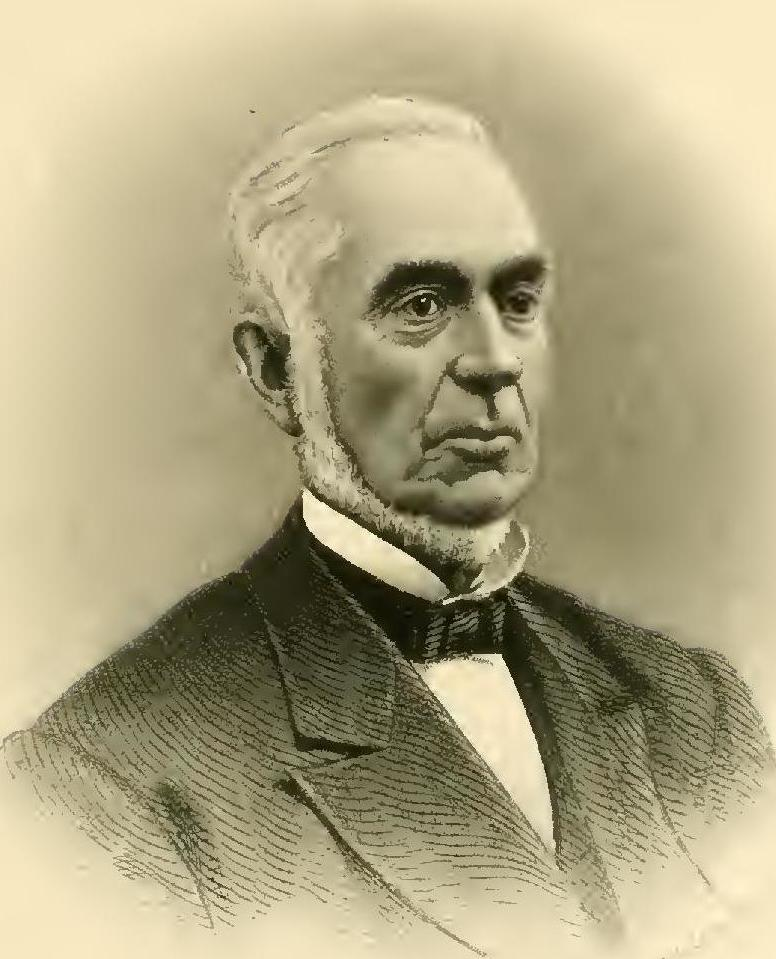

2nd Mayor of Manchester, New Hampshire
- In office May 25, 1847 – October 6, 1849
- Preceded by: Hiram Brown
- Succeeded by: Warren L. Lane

7th Mayor of Manchester, New Hampshire
- In office 1857–1857
- Preceded by: Theodore T. Abbott
- Succeeded by: Alonzo Smith

Personal details
- Born: July 9, 1817
- Died: April 15, 1892 (aged 74)
- Party: Whig

Jacob Franklin James (July 9, 1817 – April 15, 1892) was an American politician who served as the second and seventh mayor of Manchester, New Hampshire.

== First election ==
James was the Whig candidate for mayor of Manchester, New Hampshire, he was elected on May 22, 1847, and was sworn in on May 25, 1847. He was reelected in 1848. James served until his successor was sworn in as mayor on October 6, 1849.

== Second election ==
In 1857, as a result of a November 1856 election, James again became the mayor of Manchester.

== Death ==
James died on April 15, 1892.

== Notes ==
Political offices
Preceded by Hiram Brown	Mayor of Manchester, New Hampshire; May 25, 1847 – October 6, 1849	Succeeded by Warren L. Lane
Preceded by Theodore T. Abbott	Mayor of Manchester, New Hampshire; 1857	Succeeded by Alonzo Smith
