= Walter and Sylvia Stockmayer House =

- U.S. National Register of Historic Places
- Location within Vermont Location within the United States
- Location: 48 Overlook Dr., Norwich, Vermont
- Coordinates: 43°43′37″N 72°18′15″W
- Area: 2.92 acres (1.18 ha)
- Architect: Gelbin, Allan
- Architectural style: Mid-Century Modern
- NRHP reference No.: 100005643
- Added to NRHP: September 23, 2020

The Walter and Sylvia Stockmayer House is a historic house at 48 Overlook Drive in Norwich, Vermont. Built in 1961 to a design by Allan Gelbin, it is one of the town's finer examplers of Usonian Mid-Century Modern architecture, a style espoused by Frank Lloyd Wright that is also relatively rare in the state. It was listed in the National Register of Historic Places in 2020.

== Description and history ==
The Stockmayer House is located in a rural setting north of the village center of Norwich, on about 3 acres (1.2 ha) on the north side of Willey Hill Road. The house is set near the north end of the property, with the terrain sloping gradually to the south. This area is primarily meadow, opening views from the house to the surrounding countryside. The house is a single-story construction, with an irregularly but roughly rectangular footprint. It is built with wood framing on a concrete foundation, its exterior finished in board-and-batten siding with metal-framed glass. It has a flat roof finished in membrane, except for a central low-pitch gable finished in glass, providing skylit illumination into the house's interior. An open carport extends to the right of the main structure. The southern facade of the house is primarily glass, with a deep overhanging eave providing shade from the summer heat. A designed patio landscape extends further to the south. The interior of the house retains many original features and finished.

The house was built in 1961 for Walter and Sylvia Stockmayer; he had then recently accepted a professorship at Dartmouth College in nearby Hanover, New Hampshire. The house was designed by Allan Gelbin, a protégé of Frank Lloyd Wright who was then in the early years of a productive career. The Stockmayers, seeking a modern design for their home, were connected to Gelbin by Lucille Zimmerman, who owned a Wright-designed house in Manchester, New Hampshire. Gelbin later described the work on designing and building the house as being highly influential on his subsequent work.

== See also ==
- National Register of Historic Places listings in Windsor County, Vermont
