= WFEA =

Radio station in Manchester, New Hampshire

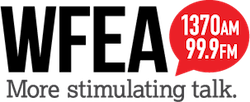
- Manchester, New Hampshire; United States
- Broadcast area: Merrimack Valley
- Frequency: 1370 kHz
- Branding: 99.9 FM and 1370 WFEA

Programming
- Format: Talk
- Network: ABC News Radio
- Affiliations: Compass Media Networks; Salem Radio Network; Westwood One

Ownership
- Owner: Saga Communications; (Saga Communications of New England, LLC)
- Sister stations: WZID; WMLL

History
- First air date: March 1, 1932

Technical information
- Licensing authority: FCC
- Facility ID: 58543
- Class: B
- Power: 5,000 watts
- Transmitter coordinates: 42°54′26.31″N 71°27′43.24″W
- Translator: 99.9 W260CF (Manchester)
- Repeater: 96.5 WMLL-HD2 (Bedford)

Links
- Public license information: Public file; LMS
- Webcast: Listen live
- Website: 1370wfea.com

WFEA (1370 kHz) is a commercial AM radio station in Manchester, New Hampshire, United States, airing a talk radio format. It is owned by Saga Communications, which also owns 95.7 WZID and 96.5 WMLL. WFEA's studios and offices are on North Commercial Street in Manchester.

WFEA is powered at 5,000 watts, using a directional antenna with a two-tower array. Its AM transmitter is on Daniel Webster Highway (U.S. Route 3) in Merrimack, at its original studio building. One of the towers in the Merrimack array is a diamond-shaped "Blaw-Knox", a smaller version of the famous Blaw Knox tower of WLW in Cincinnati. Programming is also heard on FM translator station W260CF at 99.9 MHz. The FM transmitter is on Mount Uncanoonuc in Goffstown. WFEA is simulcast on the second HD Radio subchannel of WMLL. Until February 1, 2017, it was on the HD3 subchannel of WZID.

== History ==
=== Early years ===
WFEA has been broadcasting continuously since 9:00 a.m. on March 1, 1932. It is New Hampshire's oldest radio station and has always had the same call sign. Over the years, WFEA has had 10 owners. From its first day on the air, WFEA was an affiliate of the Yankee Network and the CBS Radio Network.

Before the enactment of the North American Regional Broadcasting Agreement (NARBA) in 1941, WFEA broadcast on 1340 kHz. It transmitted with 1,000 watts by day and 500 watts at night. It was owned by the New Hampshire Broadcasting Company.

=== Move to AM 1370 ===
After NARBA, WFEA shifted to AM 1370, with 5,000 watts around the clock. WFEA switched its affiliation to the NBC Red Network and the Mutual Broadcasting System. During the "Golden Age of Radio", WFEA carried NBC and Mutual's schedule of dramas, comedies, news, sports, variety shows, soap operas, game shows and big band broadcasts.

As network programming shifted from radio to TV, in the 1950s and 1960s, WFEA evolved into a Top 40 sound. As contemporary music listeners switched to FM, WFEA began airing a full service hot AC format in the mid-1980s. By the late 1980s, it switched to mainstream adult contemporary music.

=== Adult standards, talk, and sports ===
In 1990, WFEA switched to a satellite-delivered adult standards format, known as "America's Best Music", from Westwood One. It featured artists such as Frank Sinatra, Tony Bennett, The Carpenters, Dionne Warwick, Barry Manilow, Neil Diamond, Elvis Presley, Barbra Streisand, and Nat "King" Cole. In November 1990, WFEA was acquired by Saga Communications. WFEA broadcast Arena Football League games of the Manchester Wolves before the team folded at the end of the 2009 season, and New Hampshire Wildcats football and basketball games.

The music format was discontinued in February 2015 and WFEA switched to talk programming, with hourly updates from CBS Radio News.

== Programming ==
Weekdays begin with the WFEA Morning Update, a news and interview show hosted by Jeff Chidester. The rest of the weekday schedule is nationally syndicated programs hosted by Boston-based Howie Carr and Grace Curley, Armstrong & Getty, The Mark Levin Show, John Batchelor, America in the Morning and Red Eye Radio.

On weekends, shows on money, health, home repair, law, travel, cars and technology are heard, some of which are paid brokered programming. Weekend syndicated hosts include Kim Komando, Lars Larson, Larry Kudlow, Rudy Maxa, Jill Schlesinger and Bill Handel. Most hours begin with an update from ABC News Radio.

== Translator ==
Broadcast translator for WFEA
Call sign	Frequency	City of license	FID	ERP (W)	Class	Transmitter coordinates	FCC info	Notes
W260CF	99.9 FM	Manchester, New Hampshire	154234	110	D	42°59′2.3″N 71°35′20.2″W	LMS	Relays WMLL-HD2
