= Academy for Science and Design =

Coordinates: 42°47′17″N 71°31′15″W

Location
- 9 Townsend West; Nashua, Hillsborough County, New Hampshire 03063; United States

Information
- School type: Public, charter school
- Established: 2007; 19 years ago
- Director: Jennifer Cava
- Teaching staff: 6–8: 19.5 (FTE) (2018–19); 9–12: 10.6 (FTE) (2018–19)
- Grades: 5–12
- Enrollment: 6–8: 291 (2018–19); 9-12: 241 (2018–19)
- Student to teacher ratio: 6–8: 14.92 (2018–19); 9–12: 22.74 (2018–19)
- Website: asdnh.org

The Academy for Science and Design (ASD) is a Blue-ribbon public charter school located in the city of Nashua, New Hampshire, United States. It has consistently been ranked as among the top high schools in the United States, as well as the #1 school in the state of New Hampshire. ASD concentrates on providing a STEM-based education. The academy is tuition-free for New Hampshire residents. However, the limited space available for new students at the school makes a lottery system necessary. All applicants who are eligible for the lottery (who completed the application requirements by the deadline) are drawn and this order is used to create the waiting list each year. The school is physically located in Nashua, but is a New Hampshire public school and all New Hampshire students are eligible to apply for enrollment. Nashua students are not given priority over students from any other New Hampshire towns.

ASD opened in September 2007 and is currently serving 525 students from over 40 New Hampshire communities in grades 5 through 12. The academy offers a science, technology, engineering and math oriented curriculum beginning with algebra, integrated biology and chemistry, and physics in grade 7.

== History ==
The establishment of the school was approved in March 2006. Its establishment was sponsored by Daniel Webster College. The school opened for the 2007-08 academic year. During the 2011-12 year, grade 6 was added to the school. Prior to the 2012-13 school year, ASDNH moved from its original location in Merrimack, New Hampshire, to its current location in Nashua, expanding the size of the student body. On October 3, 2014, Dr. Scott F. Bobbitt donated $30,000 for the construction of a full chemistry lab, now officially named the Bobbitt lab after its donator. In 2015, the Academy for Science and Design was ranked the 50th best high school in America by Newsweek., and rose to 44th in 2016. It is currently ranked as the best high school in New Hampshire. On September 28, 2017, ten years after opening for their first year, the school won the National Blue Ribbon Schools award.

In the 2023-24 school year, the Academy for Science and Design opened at their new location at 9 Townsend West in Nashua after a delay of 3 weeks, due to fire safety concerns, on the 18th of September.

== Curriculum ==
The academy's goal is to be internationally competitive. Algebra 1, Experimental Physics, and Integrated Biology and Chemistry are taught beginning in grade 7. Chemistry and biology are taught as a three-year course referred to as "Integrated Biology and Chemistry" or "IBC". Beginning in the 2018-2019 year, the course previously known as "IBC III" became known as "Chemistry Honors" to minimize confusion, and the course titled "IBC II" is now known as "Biology Honors" Starting in 2012, world history (now known as "Social Studies") and language arts are taught as a package course titled "Humanities". Technology and design are taught in dedicated courses as "Technology Design" and "Technology Applications in Society". Information technologies are integrated throughout the curriculum. In addition to the course load, the students are required to complete 150 community service hours as well as a junior internship comprising approximately 100 hours in the specialty that they have chosen. Student projects emphasize research skills and engineering. German, Latin, and Spanish are offered as the initial foreign languages.

Recently, in the 2023-2024 school year, the academy started a new 5th grade program similar to their 6th grade program.

== Achievements ==
- Mathcounts
  - First place in the 2014 Southern New Hampshire Regional Competition
  - First in 2015 Southern New Hampshire Regional Competition
- FIRST Tech Challenge
  - First in The Wapack Northern New England FTC Championship, 2011
- Destination Imagination
  - 2013 New Hampshire State champions
- Technology Student Association
  - 2015 First Place New Hampshire Middle School
- National Blue Ribbon Schools Award

== See also ==
- The Founders Academy
