= City Hall Plaza =

City Hall Plaza may refer to:

- City Hall Plaza (Boston), Massachusetts, USA
- City Hall Plaza (Manchester), New Hampshire, USA
