= List of tallest buildings in New Hampshire =

This is a list of the tallest buildings in the state of New Hampshire that are above 150 ft based on standard height measurement. Television masts, service poles and chimneys are not included in this list.

== Tallest buildings ==
Rank	Name	Image	Height ft (m)	Floors	Year	City	Notes
1	City Hall Plaza		275 ft (84 m)	20	1992	Manchester	Office
2	Brady Sullivan Plaza		259 ft (79 m)	20	1972	Manchester	Office and Residential
3	Wall Street Tower Apartments		223 ft (68 m)	18	1985	Manchester	Residential
4	St. Mary & Archangel Michael Coptic Orthodox Church (former St. Francis Xavier Rectory)		185 ft (56 m)	6	1898	Nashua	Church
5	Brady Sullivan Tower		180 ft (55 m)	14	1969	Manchester	Office, retail
6	Sacred Heart Catholic Church		175 ft (53 m)		1850	Concord	Former church (neo gothic style) converted to residential)
7	South Congregational Church		169 ft (52 m)		1860	Concord	Church
8	First Church of Christ Scientist		165 ft (50 m)		1903	Concord	Church
9	Rev. Raymond Burns High Rise		161 ft (49 m)	13		Manchester	Residential
10	First Church of Nashua		160 ft (49 m)		1894	Nashua	Church
11	United Church of Christ		152 ft (46 m)		1861	Keene	Church
12	New Hampshire State House		150 ft (46 m)	3	1819	Concord	Government
13	Grace Methodist Church		150 ft (46 m)		1869	Keene	Church

== Timeline of tallest buildings ==
1819-1894: New Hampshire State House
1850-1898: Sacred Heart Catholic Church
1898-1972: St. Francis Xavier Rectory (now St. Mary & Archangel Michael Coptic Orthodox Church)
1972-1992: Hampshire Plaza (now Brady Sullivan Plaza)
1992-present: City Hall Plaza
