= WZID =

Radio station in Manchester, New Hampshire

- Manchester, New Hampshire; United States
- Broadcast area: Southern New Hampshire
- Frequency: 95.7 MHz (HD Radio)
- Branding: 95.7 WZID

Programming
- Format: Adult contemporary
- Subchannels: HD2: Rewind 94.1 (classic hits); HD3: 106.9 & 103.1 The Outlaw (classic country)
- Affiliations: Premiere Networks

Ownership
- Owner: Saga Communications; (Saga Communications of New England, LLC)
- Sister stations: WFEA; WMLL

History
- First air date: October 2, 1947 (as WKBR-FM)
- Former call signs: WKBR-FM (1947–1971)

Technical information
- Licensing authority: FCC
- Facility ID: 58550
- Class: B
- ERP: 14,500 watts
- HAAT: 282 meters (925 ft)
- Transmitter coordinates: 42°59′2.3″N 71°35′20.2″W
- Translators: HD2: 94.1 W231BR (Manchester); HD3: 103.1 W276BJ (Concord); HD3: 106.9 W295BL (Manchester)

Links
- Public license information: Public file; LMS
- Webcast: Listen live; HD2: Listen live; Listen live
- Website: wzid.com; HD2: rewind941.com; HD3: outlawnh.com

WZID (95.7 FM) is a commercial radio station in Manchester, New Hampshire, United States. WZID is owned by Saga Communications with an adult contemporary format and studios on Commercial Street in Manchester. In the evening, it carries the nationally syndicated call-in and dedication show Delilah.

WZID is a Class B FM station. It has an effective radiated power (ERP) of 14,500 watts. The transmitter is atop a tower it shares with WMUR-TV in Goffstown. WZID's signal can be heard as far south as the Massachusetts Turnpike, as far east as southern Maine and as far west as Vermont. WZID broadcasts using HD Radio technology. It plays classic hits on its HD2 subchannel and classic country music on its HD3 subchannel. Both subchannels feed several FM translators.

== History ==
The station signed on the air on October 2, 1947, as WKBR-FM. It was the sister station to WKBR (1250 AM, now WGAM). For its first several decades, WKBR-FM simulcast most of WKBR's programming. The stations were network affiliates of the Mutual Broadcasting System.

Throughout the 1960s and early 1970s, WKBR-AM-FM aired a Top 40 format. In July 1971, the simulcast ended. WKBR-FM's call sign was changed to WZID and the format was flipped to beautiful music. The station was mostly automated, playing quarter-hour sweeps of soft, instrumental music. In the 1980s, the instrumentals were scaled back, with soft vocal hits added. Over time, the station evolved to soft adult contemporary.

In October 1990, Sunshine Broadcasting of New Hampshire Inc. announced the sale of WZID, along with sister station WFEA, to Saga Communications Inc. of Grosse Pointe Farms, Michigan. The sale was finalized April 16, 1991. Saga Communications of New England LLC operates the station today. WZID's president and general manager is Bob Cox.

== Translators ==
WZID used to be heard on a translator station in Peterborough, New Hampshire, W270AH 101.9. However in 2008, Saga Communications filed a series of minor translator applications which moved the translator into the Keene radio market as W276CB, a translator of Saga radio station WKNE's HD3 channel as "Kool 103.1" (now WINQ-FM's HD2 channel as "WINK Classic Country 103.1FM").

Up until mid-January 2009, WZID had two more translators, W231BR 94.1 in Manchester at 250 watts and W276BJ 103.1 in Concord, also at 250 watts, but in January 2009 those two translators were turned into the new "Hot Hits 94.1 and 103.1", a simulcast of WZID's HD2 channel, which is a top 40 station broadcasting Dial Global's Hits Now! format; branding themselves as the new hit music station in New Hampshire. Saga Communications obviously had been planning this out for some time because both the translators' power were recently increased from low power to 250 watts. This station was a direct competitor to Manchester’s heritage CHR 105.5 WJYY, but had an inferior signal compared to it. Saga was able to open up this new station due to a loophole in the Federal Communications Commission (FCC) rules that allows HD sub-channel stations to be repeated on translators. On December 11, 2013, Hot Hits had short-lived intentions of increasing the HAAT of W231BR up to 270 meters to provide significant coverage improvements to the Keene, Portsmouth and Lowell areas; however, this signal upgrade had never occurred. On August 18, 2014, WZID was granted permission to implement W231BR's current HAAT of 18 meters (59 feet) (although the ERP of the translator would remain at 250 watts), to improve W231BR's coverage of surrounding communities (such as Keene, Portsmouth and Lowell), although to a somewhat lesser extent of signal improvement than originally contemplated back in late 2013.

Beginning in mid July 2015, WZID began simulcasting sister station WFEA on its HD3 channel which in turn is broadcast on newly purchased 110-watt translator W260CF serving the greater Manchester area from its tower on Mt. Uncanoonuc in Goffstown at 99.9 FM. On February 1, 2017, WZID's HD3 sub channel changed their format from the WFEA simulcast to classic country, branded as "103.1 The Outlaw", as it replaced "Hot Hits" on W276BJ 103.1 FM in Concord. In January 2020, Saga acquired a second translator, W295BL 106.9 FM in Manchester, to carry "The Outlaw".

On November 23, 2018, WZID's HD2 subchannel changed its format from top 40 to classic hits, branded as "Rewind 94.1".

| Call sign | Frequency | City of license | FID | ERP (W) | HAAT | Class | Transmitter coordinates | FCC info | Notes |
|---|---|---|---|---|---|---|---|---|---|
| W231BR | 94.1 FM | Manchester, New Hampshire | 140894 | 250 | 28 m (92 ft) | D | 42°59′25.3″N 71°27′49.2″W | LMS | Relays WZID-HD2 ("Rewind 94.1") |
| W276BJ | 103.1 FM | Concord, New Hampshire | 140927 | 250 | 138.5 m (454 ft) | D | 43°7′9.2″N 71°32′56.2″W | LMS | Relays WZID-HD3 ("106.9 & 103.1 The Outlaw") |
| W295BL | 106.9 FM | Manchester, New Hampshire | 139440 | 250 | 32 m (105 ft) | D | 42°59′34.3″N 71°27′48.2″W | LMS | Relays WZID-HD3 ("106.9 & 103.1 The Outlaw") |
