= List of tallest buildings in Manchester, New Hampshire =

Manchester is a city in Hillsborough County in southern New Hampshire, United States. It has a population of over 115,000 people. This article is a list of the tallest buildings in Manchester and New Hampshire.

== Tallest buildings ==
Rank	Name	Image	Height	Floors	Year	Notes
1	City Hall Plaza		275 ft (84 m)	22	1992	The tallest building in New Hampshire since its completion in 1992, succeeding the Hampshire Plaza (now Brady Sullivan Plaza). The tallest building in New England north of Cambridge, Massachusetts.
2	Brady Sullivan Plaza		259 ft (79 m)	20	1972	The tallest building in New Hampshire from 1972 until 1992.
3	Wall Street Apartments		223 ft (68 m)	18	1985	Used to have a restaurant on the top floor.
4	WZID Tower		194 ft (59 m)	5	1991	194-foot communications tower on top of the WZID Building.
5	Brady Sullivan Tower		180 ft (55 m)	18	1970	Briefly was tallest building in New Hampshire.
6	Rev. Raymond A. Burns, OSB High Rise		161 ft	13	1980	Residential. Tallest building on West Side.
7	DoubleTree by Hilton Manchester Downtown Hotel		148 ft (45 m)	12	1983	Hotel and residential building
8	Carpenter Center		148 ft (45 m)	12	1923	Once the biggest hotel in Manchester.
9	Citizens Bank Building		131 ft (40 m)	10	1913	Known throughout 20th century as the Amoskeag Bank, it was referred to as the city's first "skyscraper".
10	Hampshire Tower		127	12	1973	Condos
11	Henry J. Pariseau Building		126 ft (38 m)	11	1973	Residential
12	1155 Elm Street		121 ft (37 m)	8	1986	Office
13	Thomas B. O'Malley High Rise		112 ft (34 m)	9	1969	Residential
13	Christos Kalivas High Rise		112 ft (34 m)	9	1972	Residential
13	Residences at Manchester Place		112 ft (34 m)	7	2005	Residential
16	Elliot Hospital		100 ft (30 m)	8	1945	~300 beds
17	Center of New Hampshire		92.5 ft (28.2 m)	7	1985	Attached to the DoubleTree hotel through the Center of NH Expo.
18	SNHU Arena		92 ft (28 m)	3	2001	Hockey, concert and basketball arena.
19	Norris Cotton Federal Building		87 ft (27 m)	7	1976	
19	Governor Hugh J. Gallen Apartments		87 ft (27 m)	7		
19	Catholic Medical Center		87 ft (27 m)	7	1978	300+ beds
22	VA Hospital		75 ft (23 m)	6	1950	
22	WMUR Building		75 ft (23 m)	4	1987	Headquarters for "New Hampshire's Number One News Team".
