= McIntyre Ski Area =

Ski area in New Hampshire, United States

- Interactive map of McIntyre Ski Area
- Location: Manchester, New Hampshire, USA
- Coordinates: 43°0′18″N 71°26′24″W
- Vertical: 200 feet (60 m)
- Trails: 9; 90% Beginner; 10% Intermediate
- Lift system: 2 Doubles, 2 Magic Carpets
- Snowmaking: 100%
- Website: www.mcintyreskiarea.com

McIntyre Ski Area is a ski area adjacent to Derryfield Park in Manchester, New Hampshire, United States. It opened in 1971 with two chairlifts and a rope tow, and was operated by the city until 2009, when they leased the area and management rights to McIntyre Ski School, Inc. (now McIntyre Ski Area, LLC) for a 25-year period. The area has a ski school, snow tubing, skiing and snowboarding, and a shop, which opened in 1992.

According to its website, the ski area has 200 vertical feet (60 vertical meters) of terrain. Like many New England ski areas, it is open outside the ski season to host conferences, weddings and other events.

== History ==
Manchester began seeking a ski facility as early as 1962, when discussions began with the New Hampshire State Parks. Plans for a facility on the nearby Mt. Uncanoonuc fell through, and the city went forward with a development of its own, opening McIntyre a few years later with three runs, two Hall double chairlifts, a handle tow and a brand new lodge. In 1978 McIntyre Ski School, Inc. was formed, to cater to the beginner skier. The area was named after T. Edward McIntyre, the first superintendent of the Parks & Recreation Department, and the main force behind starting the Manchester Babe Ruth League.

Since taking over management, McIntyre Ski School has installed Magic Carpet lifts and snowmaking equipment. A new base lodge was built for the 2010–2011 season.

The opening sequence of In Your Eyes (2014) was filmed at McIntyre on 5 March 2012.

For the 2014–2015 season McIntyre upgraded their snowmaking system, by upgrading the water lines and purchased an additional snow gun. They also added a secondary motor in each ski lift, making them capable of running at a lower speed when necessary. Energy efficient lighting was also installed in some areas.
