= Toufic H. Kalil House =

House in Manchester, New Hampshire

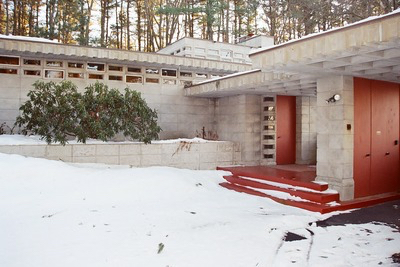
- Interactive map showing Khalil House

General information
- Type: House
- Architectural style: Usonian
- Location: 117 Heather St, Manchester, New Hampshire 03104
- Coordinates: 43.0215°N 71.4654°W
- Construction started: 1955

Technical details
- Floor area: 1,380 sq ft

Design and construction
- Architect: Frank Lloyd Wright

Website
- kalilhouse.com
- Kalil House
- U.S. National Register of Historic Places
- NRHP reference No.: 100012252
- Added to NRHP: September 22, 2025

The Toufic H. Kalil House is a house museum in the North End neighborhood of Manchester, New Hampshire, designed by Frank Lloyd Wright in 1955. The Usonian Automatic design of this house allowed Wright to meet the requirements of Dr. Toufic and Mildred Kalil, a Lebanese professional couple. Wright used the term Usonian Automatic to describe the design of economical Usonian style houses constructed of modular concrete blocks. This house uses 2,580 such blocks.

Typical of Wright's Usonian style, the Kalil house draws its beauty from simple, linear forms rather than ornamental details. Symmetrical rows of rectangular window openings give the heavy concrete a sense of airiness.

The Kalil house was designed in the mid-1950s, near the end of Wright's life, and constructed for $75,000, thrice the original cost. The Zimmerman House was built in a very different Usonian style for Dr. Kalil's good friend and hospital colleague, Dr. Zimmerman, on the same street, five years earlier.

This 1,380-square-foot (128 m^{2}) house contains a living room, kitchen, two bedrooms, two baths and a study. All of the original furniture, most of which is built-in, is still intact.

In September 2019, it was reported that the house would be put up for sale in October, with an asking price of $850,000. The Currier Museum of Art, also in Manchester and very close by, subsequently acquired the house in November 2019, and began operating public tours there and at the Zimmerman House. In September 2025, the house was added to the National Register of Historic Places.

== See also ==
- List of Frank Lloyd Wright works
- National Register of Historic Places listings in Hillsborough County, New Hampshire

== Sources ==
- Storrer, William Allin (1993). The Frank Lloyd Wright Companion. Chicago: University of Chicago Press. ISBN 978-0-226-77624-8. (S.387)
