= WMLL =

Radio station in Bedford, New Hampshire

- Bedford, New Hampshire; United States
- Broadcast area: Merrimack Valley
- Frequency: 96.5 MHz (HD Radio)
- Branding: 96.5 Live Free Country

Programming
- Format: Country
- Subchannels: HD2: WFEA simulcast

Ownership
- Owner: Saga Communications; (Saga Communications of New England, LLC)
- Sister stations: WFEA; WZID

History
- First air date: June 27, 1996
- Former call signs: WAEF (1993–1996); WOXF (1996–1997); WQLL (1997–2005)
- Call sign meaning: "Mill" (former branding)

Technical information
- Licensing authority: FCC
- Facility ID: 17278
- Class: A
- ERP: 730 watts
- HAAT: 285 meters (935 ft)
- Transmitter coordinates: 42°59′2.3″N 71°35′20.2″W

Links
- Public license information: Public file; LMS
- Webcast: Listen live
- Website: livefreecountry.com

WMLL (96.5 FM; "96.5 Live Free Country") is a commercial radio station licensed to Bedford, New Hampshire, United States, and serving the New Hampshire portion of the Merrimack Valley with a country music format. The station's studios are located on Commercial Street in Manchester. WMLL is owned by Saga Communications, and operates as part of its Manchester Radio Group.

== History ==
The 96.5 FM frequency first signed on in May 1996 with test broadcasts under the call sign WAEF. Regular broadcasting began on June 27, with a rock format branded "96.5 The Fox"; the call sign was soon changed to WOXF. The station was originally owned by Donna MacNeil.

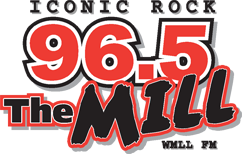
Logo as "96.5 The Mill"

On July 1, 1997, Saga Communications announced that it had signed a time brokerage agreement to take over WOXF's operations; on July 29, Saga relaunched the station as "Cool 96.5", an oldies station. The call sign was changed to WQLL on August 15, 1997; that month, Saga bought the station outright in a $3.3 million deal that was concluded on November 21, 1997. The station switched to classic rock, branded as "96.5 The Mill", in March 2005; on March 17, the call sign became WMLL. In August 2011, WMLL shifted to a classic hits format. In October 2016, WMLL returned to classic rock, branded as "Iconic Rock".

On December 15, 2023, WMLL flipped to a country music format as "96.5 Live Free Country". The new format was advertised as "Continuous Country Without The Static", as country music was previously available in the Manchester area via adjacent market stations (Portsmouth-market WOKQ, Concord-market WNHW, and two Boston stations); Saga already programmed classic country on the third HD Radio subchannel of WZID and on translators in Concord and Manchester.
