= USS Manchester =

Two ships of the United States Navy have borne the name USS Manchester, named in honor of the city of Manchester, New Hampshire.

- USS Manchester (CL-83) was a Cleveland-class light cruiser, launched in 1946 and struck in 1960
- USS Manchester (LCS-14) is an Independence-class littoral combat ship, launched in 2016
