= The Founders Academy =

Location
- 5 Perimeter Road; Manchester, New Hampshire; United States
- 42.946995°N 71.437016°W

Information
- Type: Public charter school
- Motto: Duces futuri sumus ("We are the leaders of the future")
- Established: 2014
- Dean of School: Cassie Hayes
- Grades: 5-12
- Enrollment: 285
- Website: www.thefoundersacademy.org

The Founders Academy is a charter school in Manchester, New Hampshire, United States. The academy's charter states that the focus is to provide a classical education with a business, law, and ethics focus to students in grades five through twelve who reside in the state of New Hampshire.

== History ==
The Founders Academy Foundation presented an application to the New Hampshire State Board of Education on July 18, 2013, seeking to open "The Founders Academy Public Charter School", with the purpose of providing a classical education for students in grades 6 through 12, educating them in good leadership skills.

The foundation's request was approved, and they were allowed to create and open The Founders Academy (TFA). The academy began with grades six through eight, with plans to expand up to twelfth grade. TFA opened for its inaugural year September 2, 2014, with nine staff members and a student body of 100 in grades 6 through 8.

As of the 2026-2027 school year, Founders has approximately 400 students across all grades.

== Construction and facilities ==
The building, a former manufacturing plant located near Manchester–Boston Regional Airport, was refurbished by North Point Construction Management over the summer of 2014 for a cost of $3,705,000. Construction continued throughout the 2014-2015 school year. The land the school resides on is owned by The Founders Academy Foundation.

The 59,260-square-foot (5,505 m^{2}) facility includes:

- 1 cafeteria
- Multiple shared faculty offices
- Maureen Mooney Library (named for its first dean, Maureen Mooney)
- Foundation Conference Room
- 29 classrooms
- Full Chemistry lab

== Curriculum ==
TFA covers the core subjects of history, English language arts, science, and mathematics. In addition, a fine arts program with classes in band, choir, and visual arts is required for middle schoolers. Every middle school student is also required to take French or Spanish.

== Student life ==
Students are able to participate in school sponsored clubs, including the Robotics Club, Minecraft Club, Running Club, Filmmakers Club, Book Club, and Ethics Club, among others.

The Founders Academy also offers middle school and high school theatre. The Founders Academy High School Theatre Troupe's 2025 production of "Bauer" by Lauren Gunderson was selected by the New Hampshire Educational Theatre Guild to represent New Hampshire at the New England Drama Festival. This production was also recognized by the NHETG for Excellence in Acting, Excellence in Costuming, and Excellence in Projections.

During the 2024-2025 academic year, students came from 25 municipalities, being Allenstown, Amherst, Bedford, Bow, Candia, Chester, Concord, Deerfield, Derry, Goffstown, Henniker, Hollis, Hooksett, Hudson, Litchfield, Londonderry, Manchester, Merrimack, Mont Vernon, Nashua, New Boston, Pelham, Pembroke, Raymond and Sandown.
