= Uncanoonuc Mountains =

Mountain peaks in New Hampshire, US

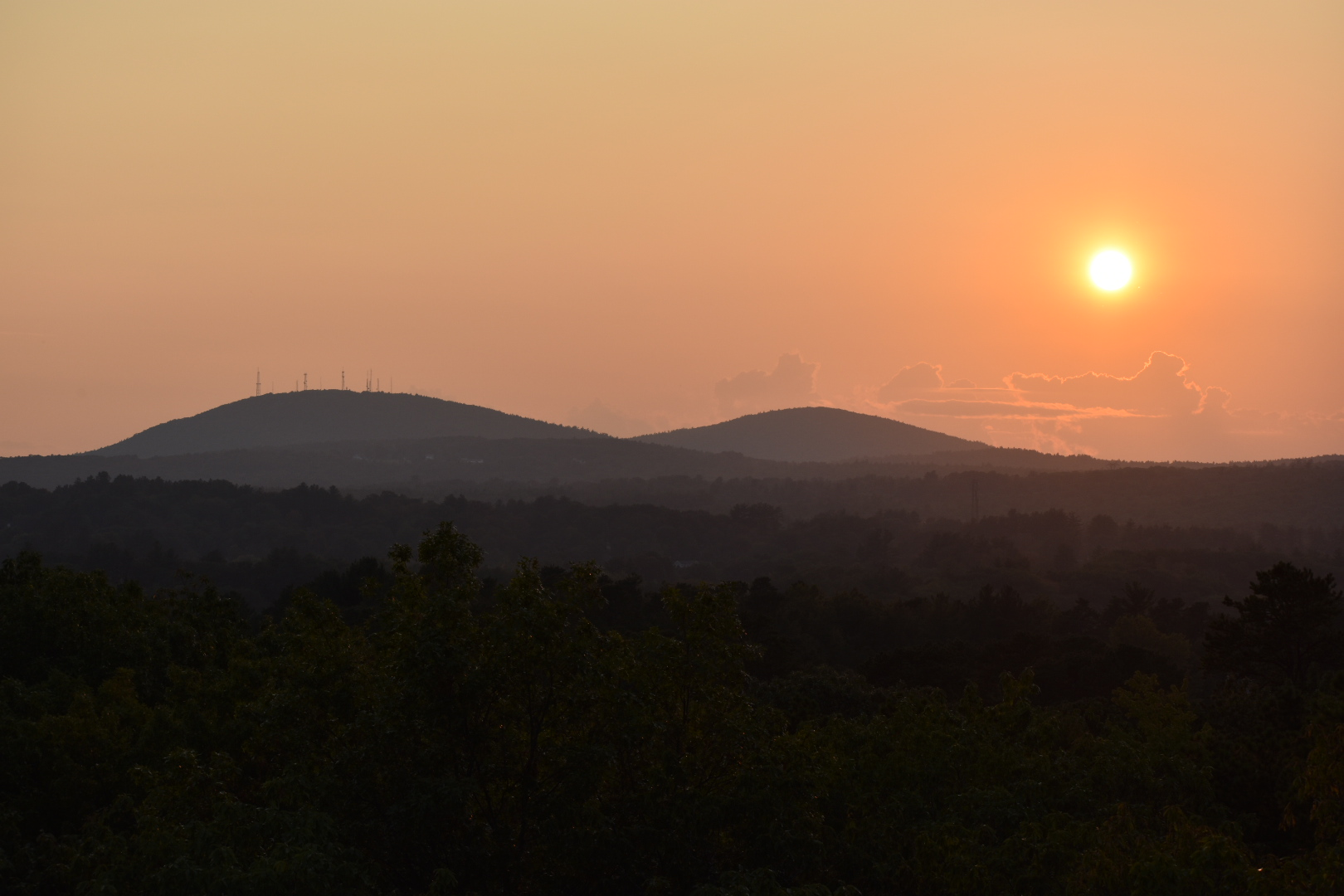
- South Uncanoonuc (left) and North Uncanoonuc (right) as seen from Rock Rimmon in Manchester, NH.

Highest point
- Elevation: 1324 ft
- Coordinates: 42°59′09″N 71°35′52″W

Geography
- Location: Goffstown, New Hampshire, U.S.

The Uncanoonuc Mountains are two small mountain peaks in Goffstown, New Hampshire, United States. The north peak, the highest point in Goffstown, has an elevation of 1,324 feet (404 m) above sea level, and the south peak rises to 1,321 feet (403 m).

The name may be derived from the Massachusett language term kuncannowet (Massachusett for 'breast'), as an obvious reference to the suggestive shape the two mountains cast over Manchester. This shape makes them examples of breast-shaped hills.

The area was developed in the early 1900s as a resort with a hotel and incline railway. The mountains are still a good spot for hiking, snowshoeing, and scenic views of the nearby skyline of Manchester, as well as Mount Monadnock, Mount Kearsarge, and even, on a clear day, the faint skyline of Boston.

They were the site of a small ski operation in the 1930s and 1940s, served by the incline railway that went up the south peak. With three main trails from top to bottom, it was a popular ski destination until 1941, when the railway was damaged by a fire. The incline railway has since been converted to a hiking trail.

A new development was planned in the 1960s for the north peak, commencing in 1963. Chairlift and snow making equipment was ordered, several trails were cleared, but the project was halted by the town of Goffstown because of environmental concerns. In response to the failure, the city of Manchester opened its own area, McIntyre, in 1971.

The south peak contains transmitting facilities for many of the broadcast stations, including WMUR-TV, serving the Manchester area.

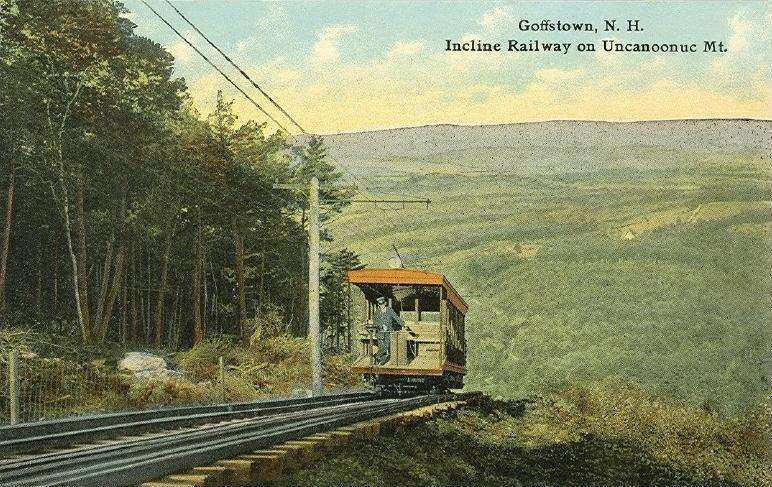
The Uncanoonuc Incline Railway in 1914
