= City Hall Plaza (Manchester) =

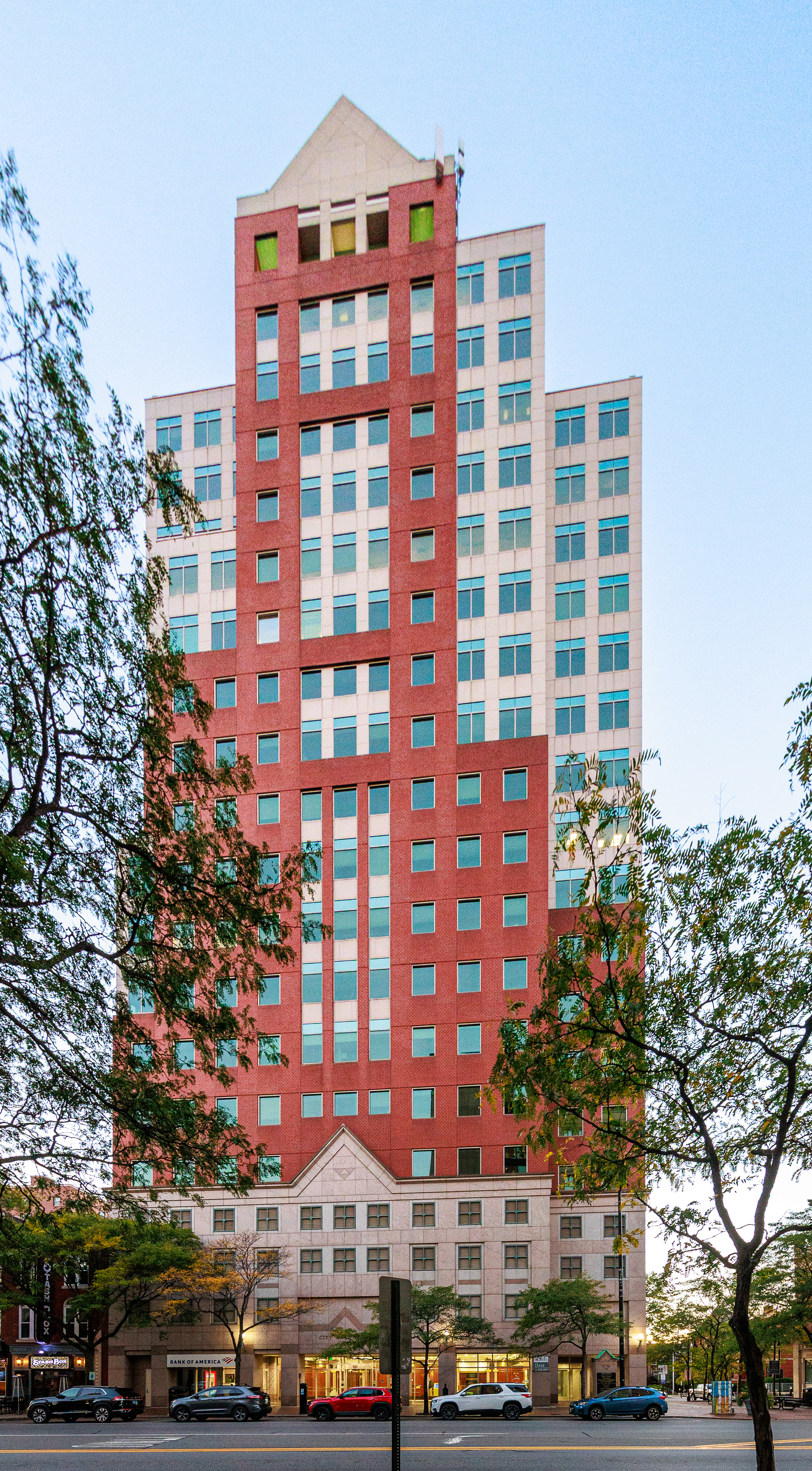
- City Hall Plaza in 2025

General information
- Type: Class-A Office Space
- Location: 900 Elm St (U.S. Route 3), Manchester, New Hampshire, United States
- Coordinates: 42°59′26″N 71°27′49″W
- Completed: 1992

Height
- Roof: 275 ft (84 m)

Technical details
- Floor count: 22
- Floor area: 209,896 sq ft (19,500.0 m^{2})

Design and construction
- Architect: Lavallee Brensinger Architects
- Developer: City of Manchester

City Hall Plaza, City Hall Plaza Tower or 900 Elm Street (U.S. Route 3), is a prominent 274-foot (84 m) office tower in Manchester, New Hampshire.

== Description ==
Since its completion in 1992, City Hall Plaza has been the tallest building in the city of Manchester, the state of New Hampshire, and northern New England (the states of New Hampshire, Maine, and Vermont). It is shorter than most of the tallest buildings in Boston, Hartford, New Haven, and Providence. The tower is used as office space for private businesses and for the Manchester city government.

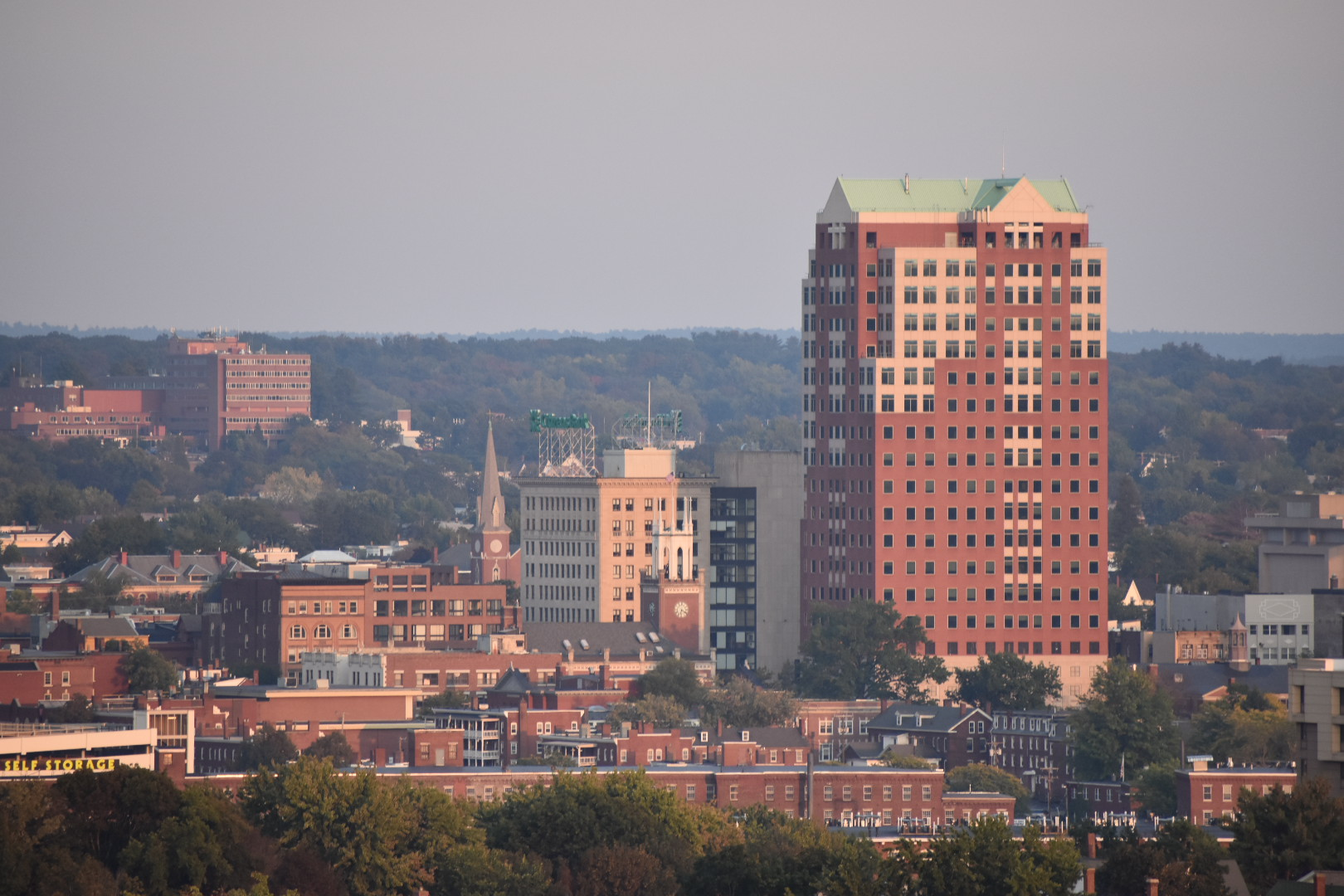
City Hall Plaza as seen from Rock Rimmon

The building is recognizable as one of the main features of the Manchester skyline, along with the Brady Sullivan Plaza, SNHU Arena, the DoubleTree Hotel, the Center of New Hampshire, and the Citizens Bank building. The facade is brick and limestone, with a four-gabled green roof. The building was built in the early 1990s (construction was completed in 1992) by Nynex Properties at a cost of $22 million.

Ownership of the building changed hands several times until it was purchased by its present owner, Brady Sullivan Properties (also the owner of the nearby Brady Sullivan Plaza, New Hampshire's second-tallest building) in September 2014.

== See also ==
- List of tallest buildings in Manchester, New Hampshire
- List of tallest buildings in New Hampshire
- List of tallest buildings by U.S. state

Preceded by Brady Sullivan Plaza	Tallest building in New Hampshire; 1992—Present; 84m	Succeeded by None
