= Zimmerman House (Manchester, New Hampshire) =

Historic house in New Hampshire, United States

- U.S. National Register of Historic Places
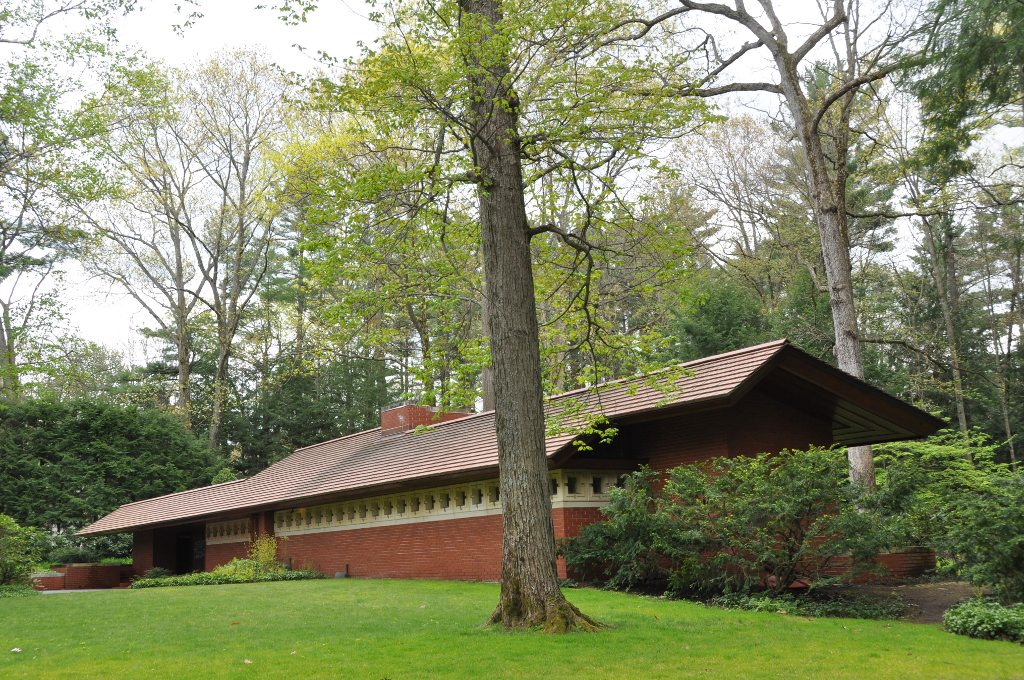
- Interactive map showing the Zimmerman House’s location
- Location: 223 Heather St., Manchester, New Hampshire 03104
- Coordinates: 43°1′18.19″N 71°27′46.34″W
- Area: 1 acre (0.40 ha)
- Built: 1951
- Architect: Frank Lloyd Wright
- Architectural style: Prairie School
- NRHP reference No.: 79003790
- Added to NRHP: October 18, 1979

The Zimmerman House is a house museum at 223 Heather Street in the North End neighborhood of Manchester, New Hampshire, United States. Built in 1951, it is the first of two houses in New Hampshire designed by Frank Lloyd Wright, the other being the Toufic H. Kalil House on the same street, built in 1955. The Zimmerman House is also one of a small number of Wright designs in the northeastern United States. The house was built for Dr. Isadore Zimmerman and his wife Lucille. The Currier Museum of Art acquired the house after the Zimmermans' deaths, when they decided to donate the home to the public. The museum provides tours of the building, which was listed on the National Register of Historic Places in 1979.

== Description and history ==
The Zimmerman House is located in a residential setting in northern Manchester, New Hampshire. It is a single-story structure, set on a floating concrete slab. It is organized around a large L-shaped central chimney, and covered by a deeply overhanging roof. The rooms are arranged in a single line, except with an open carport at one end. The interior is largely finished in cypress wood.

The house was designed in 1950 by Frank Lloyd Wright in his Usonian style for Dr. Isadore and Lucille Zimmerman. It has two bedrooms, is based on a four-foot module, and is constructed of red glazed brick with Georgia cypress trim (less expensive than tidewater cypress). John Geiger, then an apprentice in Wright's Taliesin Fellowship, was sent to New Hampshire to supervise the construction of the Zimmerman house. He was responsible for the completion of the project and much of its final changes for the clients. Wright redesigned the house around a rock just outside the front entrance. Wright's design extended to include the interior furniture and furnishings. This includes a musical quartet stand, as well as the mailbox. Wright also specified the plantings for the garden.

The property was maintained by the Zimmermans according to Wright's plan, and was donated to the Currier Museum of Art in 1988. The museum offers tours of the property with shuttle service to the house, in order to minimize traffic in the residential neighborhood. No other access to the property is permitted.

== See also ==
- List of Frank Lloyd Wright works
- National Register of Historic Places listings in Hillsborough County, New Hampshire
