= Manchester, New Hampshire =

Largest city in New Hampshire, United States

- City
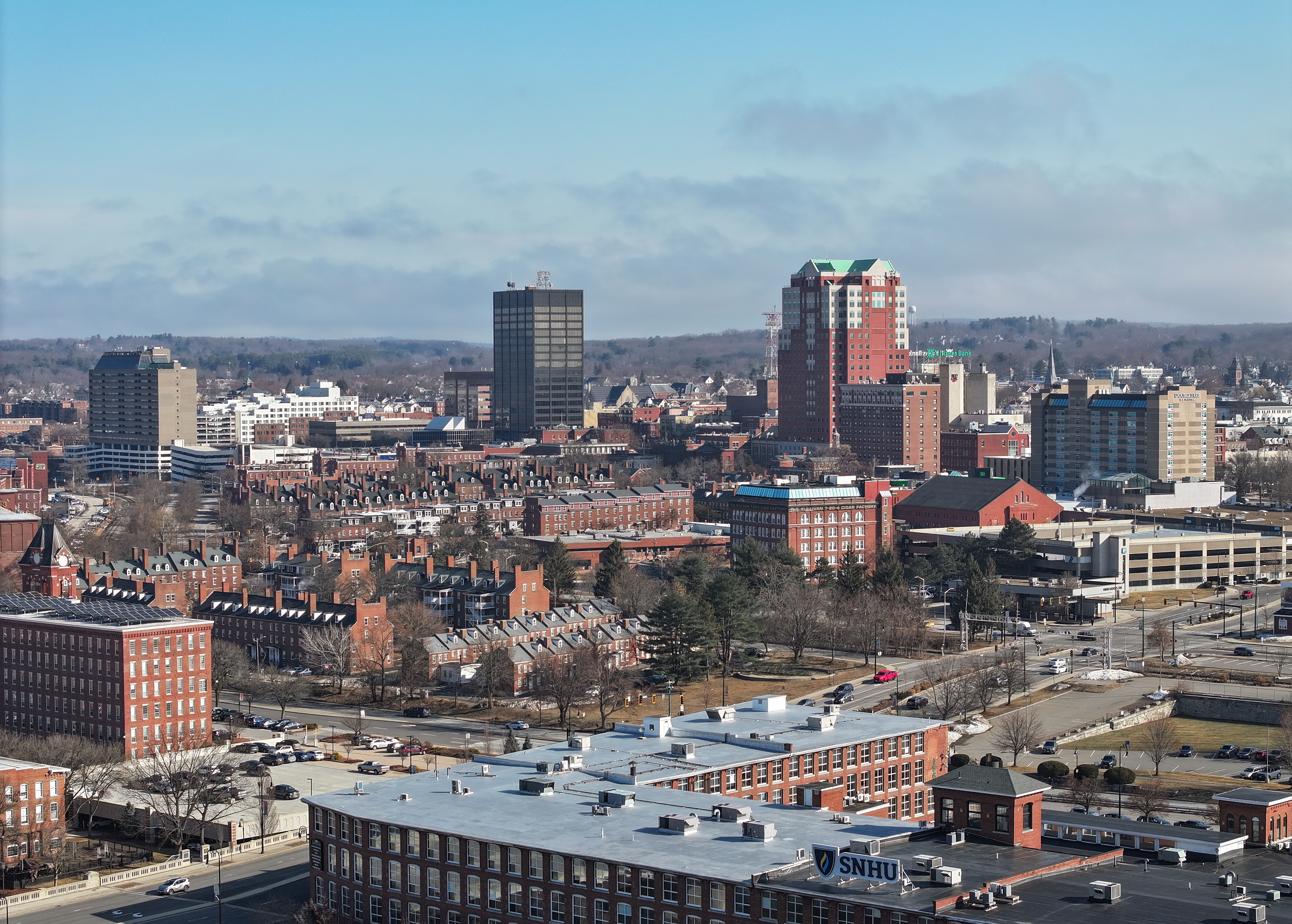
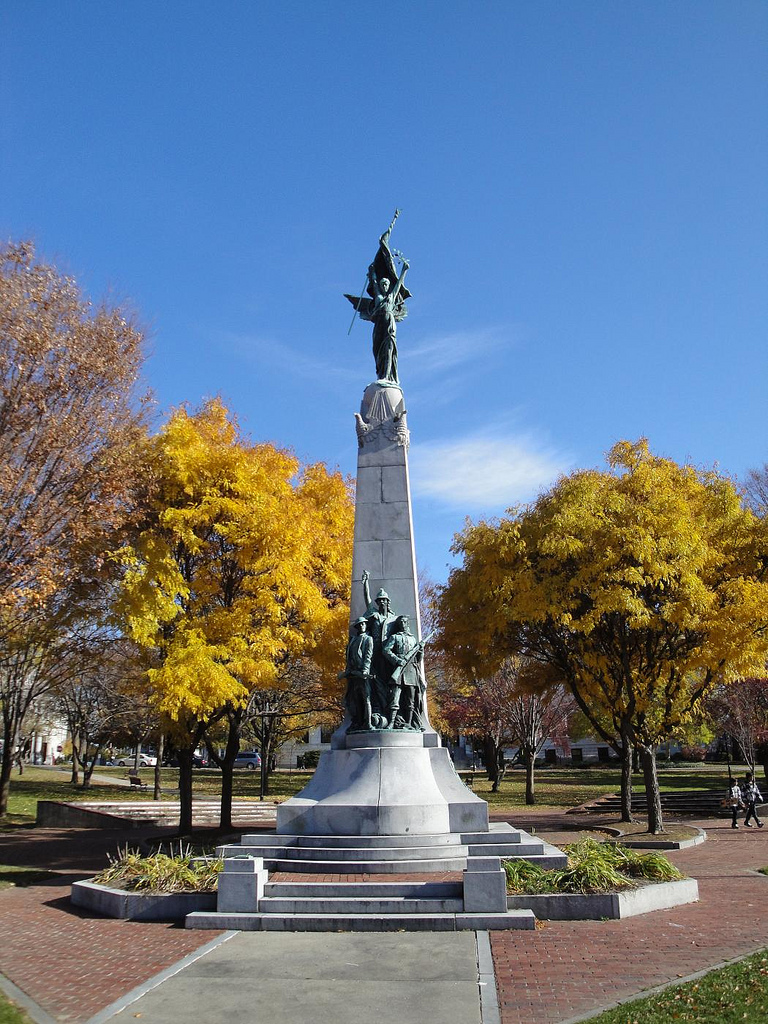
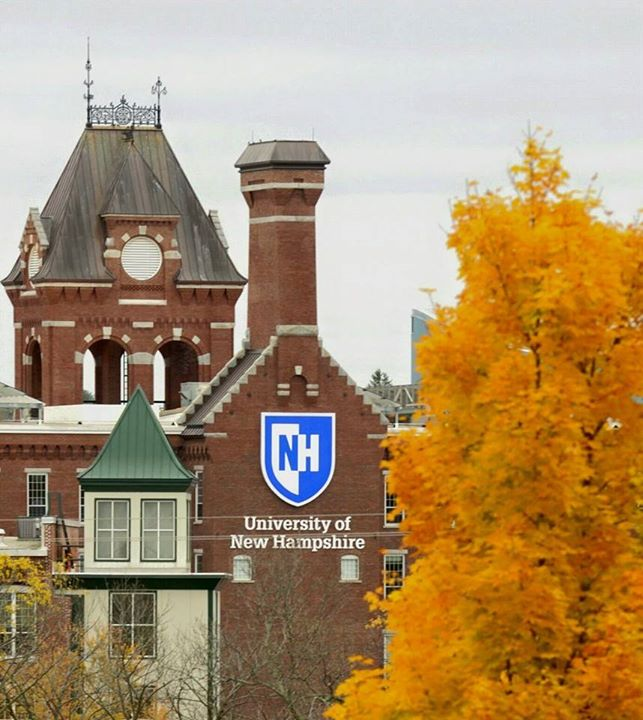
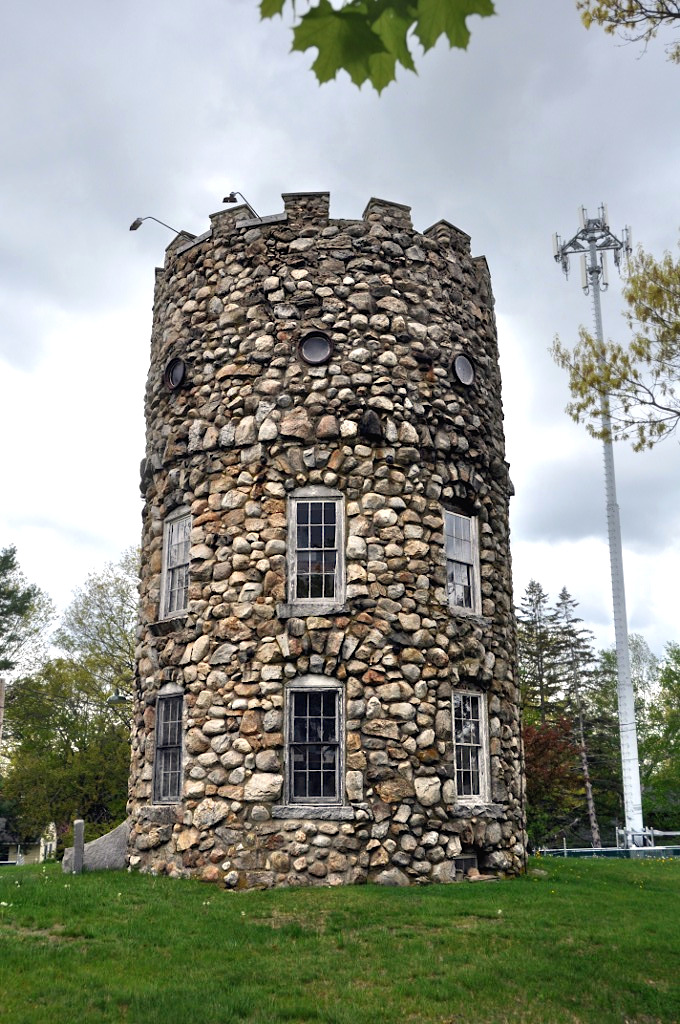
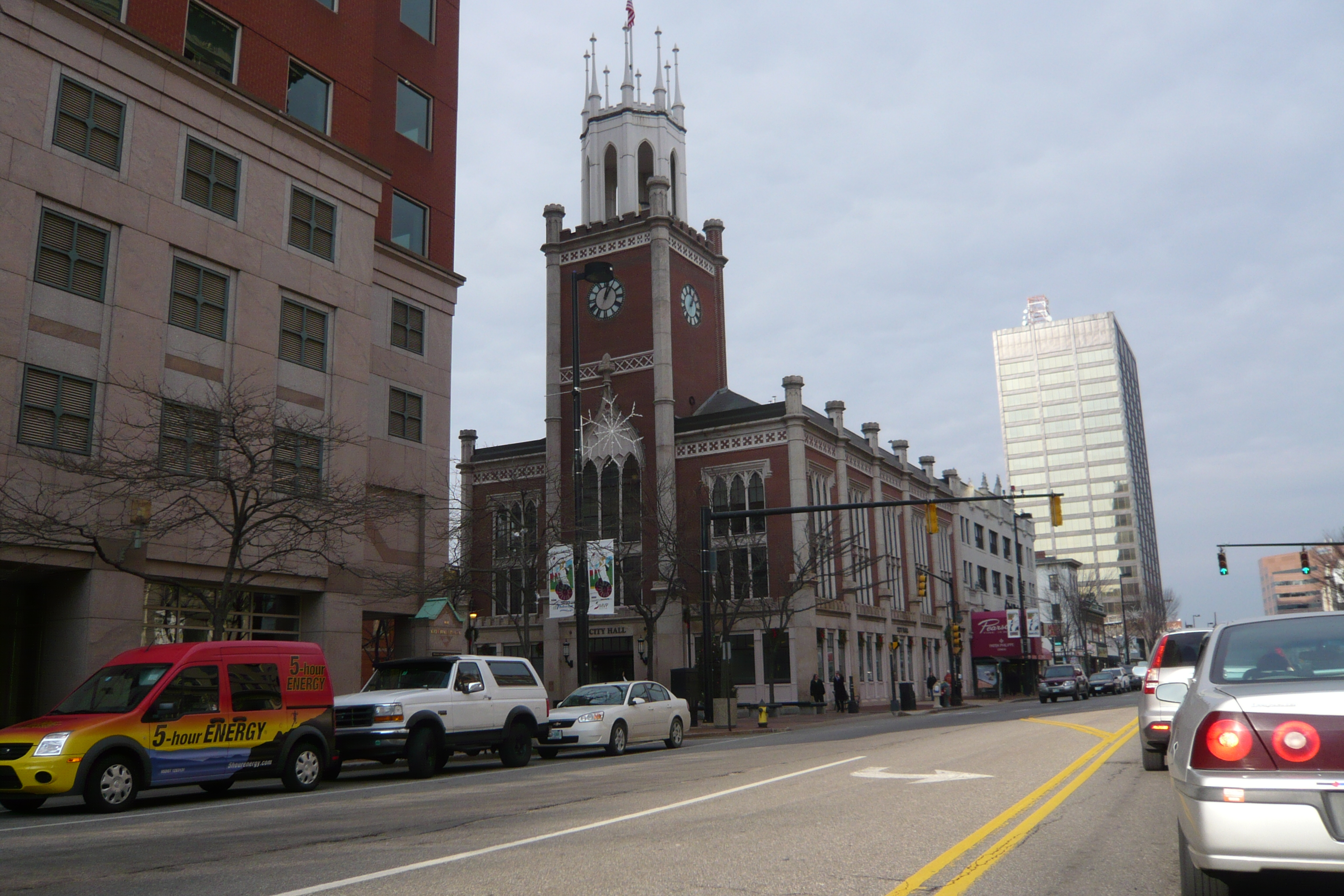
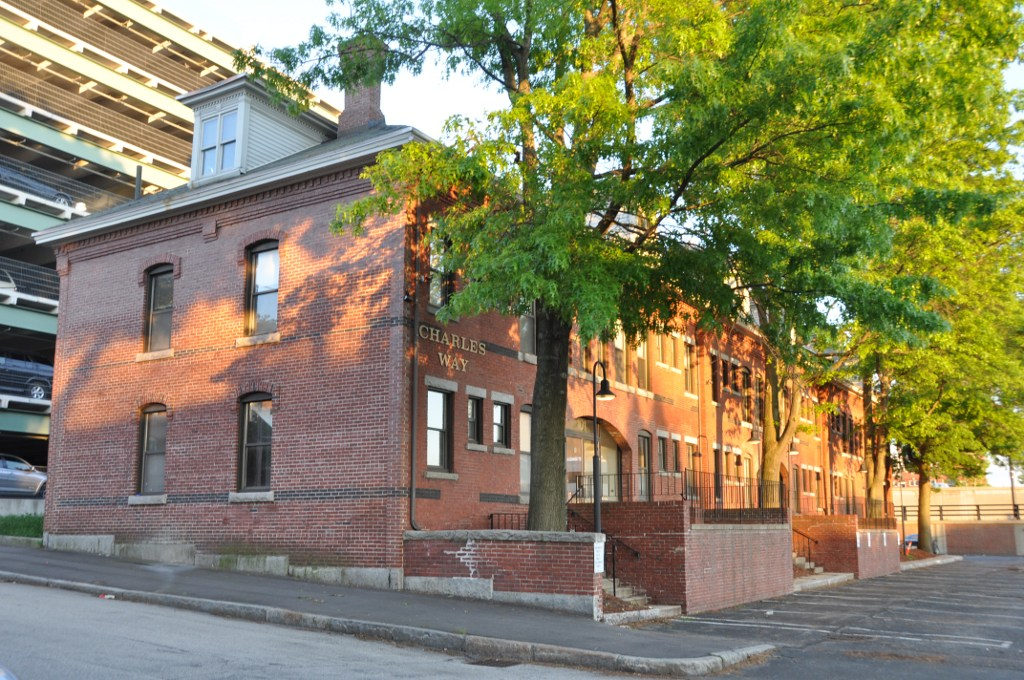
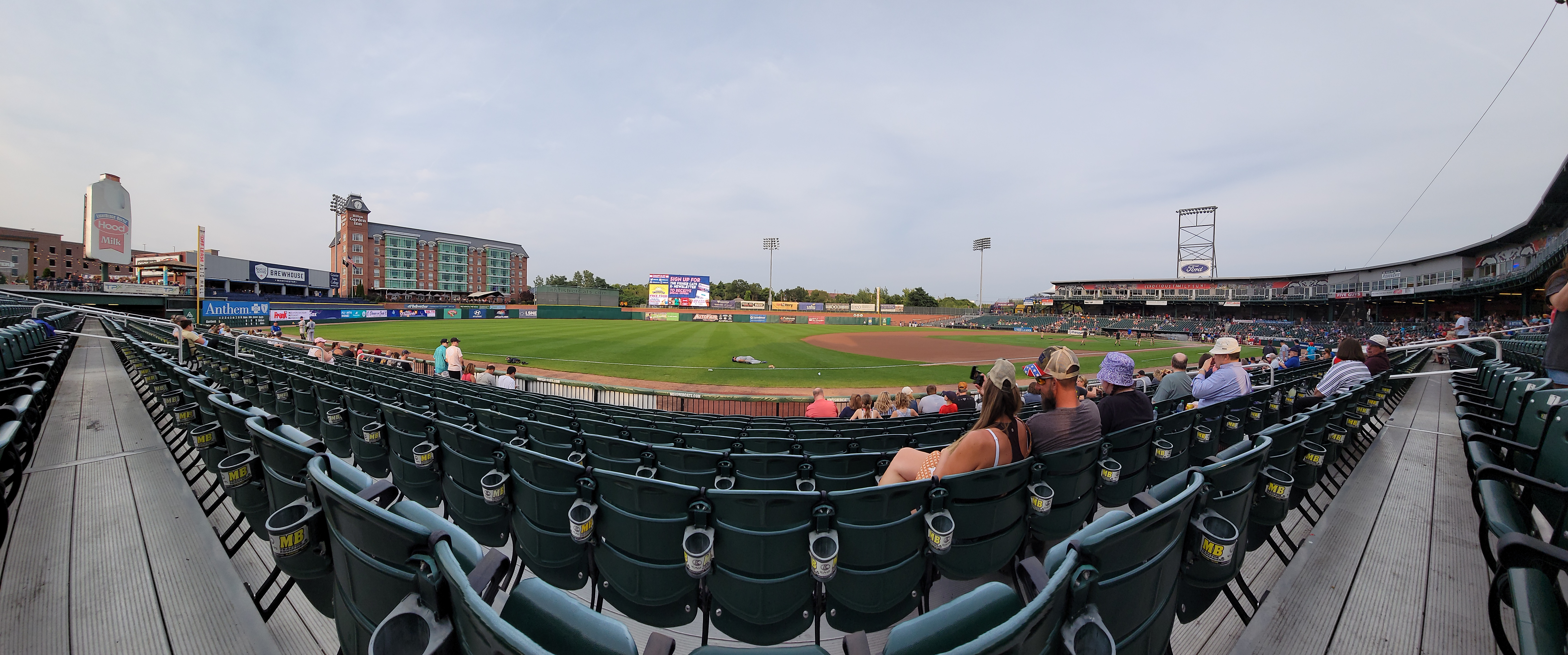
- The skyline of Manchester Victory Park UNH Manchester Smyth Tower Manchester City Hall District C Mill Housing Northeast Delta Dental Stadium

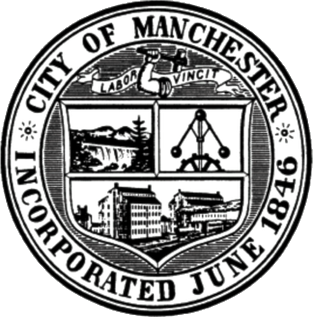
- Flag Seal
- Nicknames: Queen City, Manch Vegas
- Motto: Labor Vincit (work conquers)
- Interactive map of Manchester, New Hampshire
- Location within New Hampshire Location within the United States
- Coordinates: 42°59′27″N 71°27′49″W
- Country: United States
- State: New Hampshire
- County: Hillsborough
- Incorporated (as Derryfield): 1751
- Incorporated (as Manchester): 1846
- Named for: Manchester, England

Government
  - Mayor: Jay Ruais (R)
  - Aldermen: Members: Bryce Kaw-Uh; Dan Goonan; Dana Dexter; Christine Fajardo; Jason Bonilla; Crissy Kantor; Ross Terrio; Edward J. Sapienza; James Burkush; Bill Barry; Norm Vincent; Kelly Thomas; Daniel P. O’Neil; June Trisciani

Area
  - City: 34.93 sq mi (90.48 km^{2})
  - Land: 33.07 sq mi (85.65 km^{2})
  - Water: 1.87 sq mi (4.84 km^{2}) 5.33%
  - Urban: 86.1 sq mi (223.1 km^{2})
- Elevation: 210 ft (64 m)

Population (2020)
  - City: 115,644
  - Rank: US: 256th
  - Density: 3,497.1/sq mi (1,350.23/km^{2})
  - Urban: 158,377 (US: 209th)
  - Urban density: 1,838/sq mi (709.8/km^{2})
  - Metro: 422,937 (US: 128th)
- Time zone: UTC−5 (Eastern)
  - Summer (DST): UTC−4 (Eastern)
- ZIP Codes: 03101–03105, 03108-03109, 03111
- Area code: 603
- FIPS code: 33-45140
- GNIS feature ID: 868243
- Website: www.manchesternh.gov

Manchester is the most populous city in the U.S. state of New Hampshire. Located on the banks of the Merrimack River, it had a population of 115,644 at the 2020 census. Manchester is the tenth-most populous city in New England. Along with the city of Nashua, it is one of two seats of New Hampshire's most populous county, Hillsborough County. The Manchester–Nashua metropolitan area has approximately 423,000 residents and lies near the northern end of the Northeast megalopolis.

Manchester was first named by the merchant and inventor Samuel Blodget, eponym of Samuel Blodget Park and Blodget Street in the city's North End. His vision was to create a great industrial center similar to that of the original Manchester in England, which was the world's first industrialized city. During the Industrial Revolution, Manchester was a major industrial and economic hub for New England, with the Amoskeag Manufacturing Company being the largest cotton textile plant in the world in the early 20th century. After World War II, many textile manufacturing jobs left Manchester, but new industries and companies were introduced to the city, such as DEKA.

== History ==
The native Pennacook people called Amoskeag Falls on the Merrimack River—the area that became the heart of Manchester—Namaoskeag, meaning "good fishing place". In 1722, John Goffe III settled beside Cohas Brook, later building a dam and sawmill at what was dubbed "Old Harry's Town". It was granted by Massachusetts in 1727 as "Tyngstown" to veterans of Queen Anne's War who served in 1703 under Captain William Tyng. But at New Hampshire's 1741 separation from Massachusetts, the grant was ruled invalid and substituted with Wilton, Maine, resulting in a 1751 rechartering by Governor Benning Wentworth as "Derryfield"—a name that lives on in Derryfield Park, Derryfield Country Club, and the private Derryfield School.

== The mill years ==
In 1807, Samuel Blodget opened a canal and lock system to allow vessels passage around the falls, part of a network developing to link the area with Boston. He envisioned a great industrial center arising, "the Manchester of America", in reference to Manchester, England, then at the forefront of the Industrial Revolution. In 1809, Benjamin Prichard and others built a water-powered cotton spinning mill on the western bank of the Merrimack. Apparently following Blodgett's suggestion, Derryfield was renamed "Manchester" in 1810, the year the mill was incorporated as the Amoskeag Cotton & Woolen Manufacturing Company. It would be purchased in 1825 by entrepreneurs from Massachusetts, expanded to three mills in 1826, and then incorporated in 1831 as the Amoskeag Manufacturing Company.

Amoskeag engineers and architects planned a model company town on the eastern bank, founded in 1838 with Elm Street as its main thoroughfare. Incorporation as a city followed for Manchester in 1846, soon home to the largest cotton mill in the world—Mill No. 11, stretching 900 feet (270 m) long by 103 feet (31 m) wide, and containing 4,000 looms. Other products made in the community included shoes, cigars, and paper. The Amoskeag foundry made rifles, sewing machines, textile machinery, fire engines, and locomotives in a division called the Amoskeag Locomotive Works (later, the Manchester Locomotive Works). The rapid growth of the mills demanded a large influx of workers, resulting in a flood of immigrants, particularly French Canadians. Many current residents descend from these workers. In 1871, the arch dam was built on the Merrimack River, enhancing the mill's water power delivery system. By 1912, the production of woven cloth in the Millyard had reached a production rate of 50 miles in length per hour.

Throughout the late 19th century and the early 20th century, the city began to expand outward, and many streetcar suburbs such as Mast Road were built. Manchester was formerly home to a streetcar network, the Manchester Street Railway. The streetcar network was replaced with a bus network in the 1940s.

In 1922, 17,000 workers from two of the city's largest companies (Amoskeag and Stark Manufacturing Companies) went on strike for a period of nine months. After the strike, the textile industry began a slow decline, with the Great Depression hitting the city particularly hard. The Amoskeag Manufacturing Company declared bankruptcy in 1935. During the Great Flood of 1936, the McGregor Bridge was destroyed and $2.5 million of damage was incurred to the city's mills and buildings. After the flood, the Amoskeag Manufacturing Company reorganized out of bankruptcy as Amoskeag Industries, diversifying its manufacturing operations with new industries in the Millyard.

Manchester's economy benefitted from World War II, as the city was already well-positioned and equipped with industry to handle war-time production. In 1941, Grenier Field, on the city's border with Londonderry, was converted to a U.S. Army air base.

The city faced a decline in manufacturing in the 1950s and 1960s, with many Millyard buildings becoming abandoned during this time. An anthrax incident in 1957 led to the abandonment and later razing of the Arms Textile Mill along the river (today a parking lot in front of Arms Park). As part of urban renewal projects, the city filled in the Millyard canals to make room for roads and demolished several mill structures to make way for parking and roads. The Mall of New Hampshire opened in 1977, leading to further decline of downtown. However, during this time several important buildings were constructed in the downtown area, including the Hampshire Plaza in 1972 (the tallest building in New Hampshire until 1994, later renamed Brady Sullivan Plaza).

The 1980s brought renewed interest in the Millyard and downtown. The University of New Hampshire at Manchester opened a campus in the Millyard during this time, and Segway inventor Dean Kamen purchased two old mill buildings which became the headquarters for DEKA. Kamen purchased more buildings in 1984 and 1991, aiming to convert the Millyard into a high-tech center for smart manufacturing and offices. John Madden, a local developer, and Kamen worked with the city to implement capital improvements to the Millyard in the 1980s and early 1990s.

City Hall Plaza was built in downtown Manchester in 1992, to this day the tallest building in New Hampshire and northern New England. In 1991, the city went into economic decline as four major banks were shut down by federal regulators. Many shops and restaurants along the Elm Street thoroughfare closed during this time, as foot traffic declined. At the turn of the century, renewed interest in the Millyard led to a boom in development and business. Several high-tech firms opened offices or relocated to the Manchester Millyard in the 2000s, including Autodesk in 2000 and Dyn in 2004. Brady Sullivan, a local real estate developer, opened its first Millyard apartments in 2013. During the early to mid 2010s, Manchester saw an uptick in opioid-related deaths, reporting more opioid-related deaths per capita than any city in the United States in 2016. Since 2018, the death rate has declined through the efforts of the New Hampshire Department of Health and Human Services and local outreach organizations, hitting a 10-year low in 2023.

Manchester has continued to grow steadily and transform itself into a cultural and commerce hub for the state of New Hampshire. The mill town's 19th-century affluence left behind some of the finest Victorian commercial, municipal, and residential architecture in the state.

== Geography ==
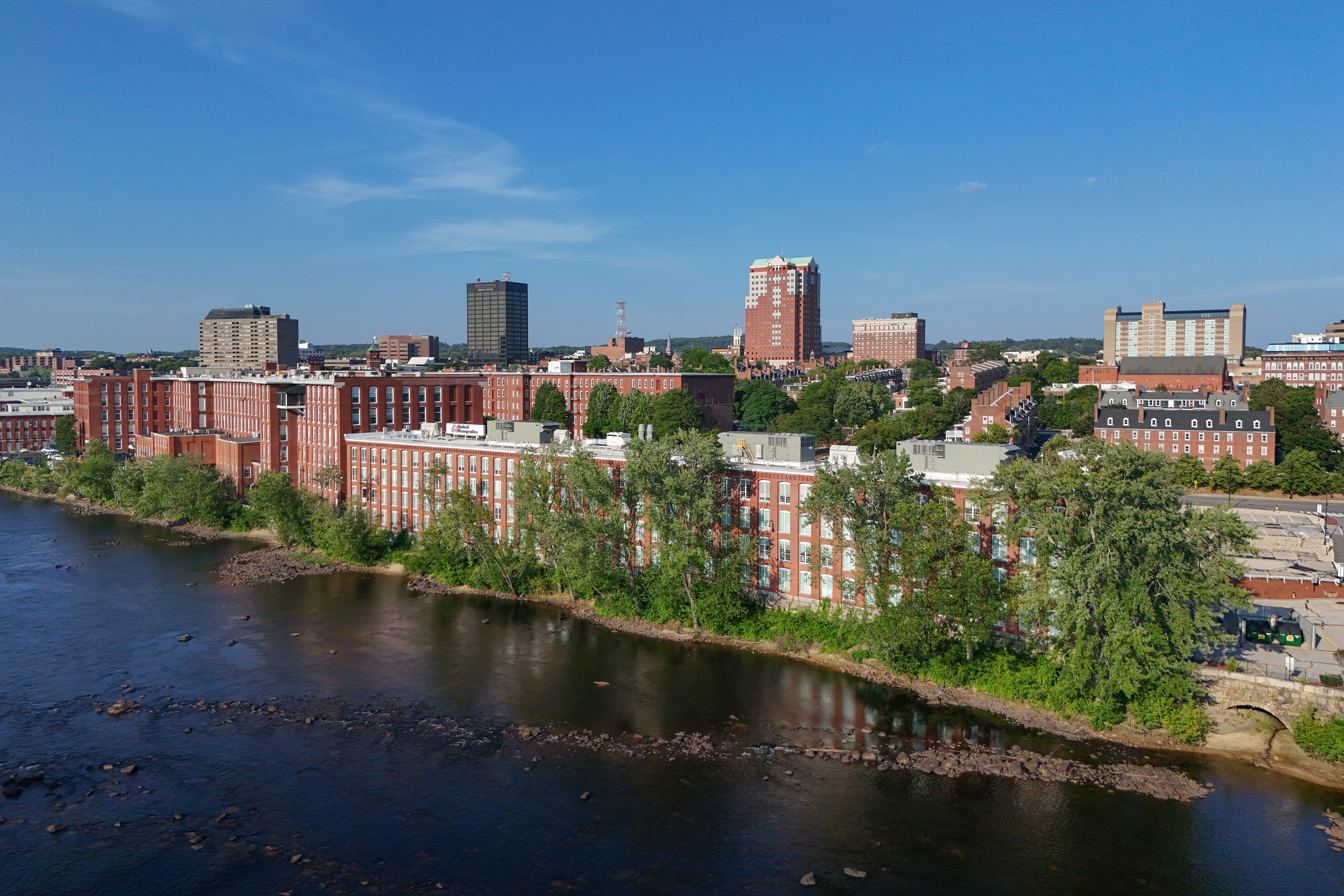
View of downtown from the west

Manchester is in south-central New Hampshire, 18 miles (29 km) south of Concord, the state capital, and the same distance north of Nashua, the second-largest city in the state. Manchester is 51 miles (82 km) north-northwest of Boston, the largest city in New England.

According to the United States Census Bureau, the city has a total area of 34.9 square miles (90.5 km^{2}), of which 33.1 square miles (85.7 km^{2}) are land and 1.9 square miles (4.8 km^{2}) are water, comprising 5.33% of the city. Manchester is drained by the Merrimack River and its tributaries the Piscataquog River and Cohas Brook. Massabesic Lake is on the eastern border. The highest point in Manchester is atop Wellington Hill, where the elevation reaches 570 feet (170 m) above sea level.

=== Neighborhoods ===
The Manchester Planning Board, in its 2010 Master Plan, defines 25 neighborhoods within the city. LivableMHT has drawn maps of the neighborhoods and neighborhood village centers as defined by the city. Recognition of particular neighborhoods varies, with some having neighborhood associations, but none have any legal or political authority.

The major neighborhoods, historically, include Amoskeag, Rimmon Heights, Notre Dame/McGregorville and Piscataquog/Granite Square, also known as "Piscat", on the West Side; the North End, Janeville/Corey Square, Hallsville and Bakersville on the East Side; and Youngsville and Goffes Falls on the periphery of the city.

In 2007, the city began a Neighborhood Initiatives program to "insure that our neighborhoods are vibrant, livable areas since these are the portions of the city where most of the residents spend their time living, playing, shopping and going to school." The purpose of this initiative is to foster vibrancy and redevelopment in the neighborhoods, and to restore the sense of neighborhood communities that had been overlooked in the city for some time. The city began the program with street-scape and infrastructure improvements in the Rimmon Heights neighborhood of the West Side, which has spurred growth and investment in and by the community. Despite the success of the program in Rimmon Heights, it was unclear in recent years how the city planned to implement similar programs throughout the city. The city announced plans for extending the Neighborhood Initiatives program to the Hollow neighborhood in February 2012.

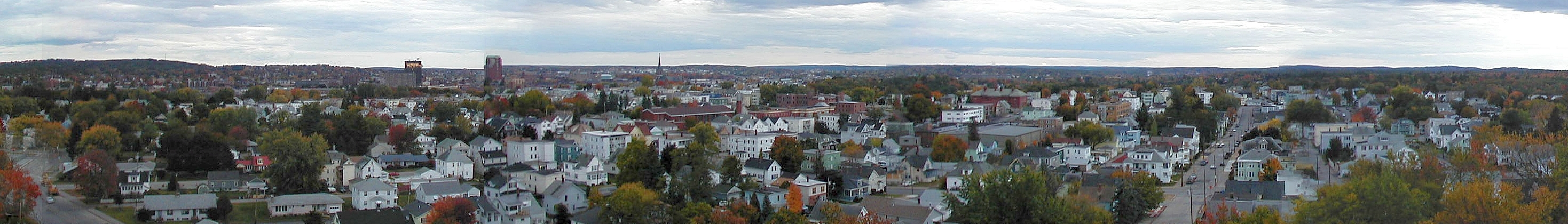
View of the West Side from Rock Rimmon

=== The "Amoskeag Ledge" ===
The Amoskeag Company required granite to build with on the mill yards. They found an area near what is now Hillside Middle School and Derryfield Park. The area, originally a granite cliff, opened in around 1835. At some point in the 1880s, after working the night prior, the area flooded with natural spring water. Once the water had flooded the work site, it was quickly abandoned but found a following in the "Manchester Brownies" swimming group. The group focused mainly on cold water diving, and the area became a popular attraction for locals. After the group broke apart around the 1930s, the quarry site quickly filled with tree branches, sand, and rocks. Attempts to fill the hole failed. Around the 1980s, local teens had picked the area as a local hangout and drinking spot. Today the area is largely left to rot minus the ones who come back or those who happen to find it. Pictures of the area can be found online.

=== Adjacent municipalities ===
- Hooksett (north)
- Auburn (east)
- Londonderry (southeast)
- Litchfield (south)
- Merrimack (south)
- Bedford (southwest)
- Goffstown (west)

=== Climate ===
Manchester has a four-season humid continental climate (Köppen Dfa), with cold and often snowy winters. Summers are very warm and very humid, often hot and oppressive. Spring and fall are pleasant and relatively brief transition seasons. The monthly daily average temperature ranges from 25.6 °F (−3.6 °C) in January to 73.8 °F (23.2 °C) in July. One of the hottest spots in New England, Manchester experiences between 26-30 days of highs at or above 90 °F (32 °C) and 3.0 days of lows at or below 0 °F (−18 °C) annually. Precipitation is well-spread throughout the year, though winter is the driest season while early spring tends to be the wettest. Record temperatures range from −29 °F (−34 °C) on February 16, 1943, up to 103 °F (39 °C) on July 22, 2011.

Climate data for Manchester–Boston Regional Airport, New Hampshire (1991−2020 normals, extremes 1885–present) (Note: Official precipitation records for Manchester were kept at an undisclosed location in the area from February 1885 to June 5, 1948, Manchester–Boston Regional Airport (KMHT) from June 6, 1948, to March 31, 1967, another, possibly differing, undisclosed location from April 1, 1967, to March 31, 1998, and again at KMHT since April 1, 1998. Temperature records began in April 1885, while snowfall records began on November 22, 1902. There are significant gaps in data coverage before April 1998; for more information, see ThreadEx.)
Month	Jan	Feb	Mar	Apr	May	Jun	Jul	Aug	Sep	Oct	Nov	Dec	Year
Record high °F (°C)	69 (21)	77 (25)	85 (29)	94 (34)	97 (36)	102 (39)	103 (39)	100 (38)	100 (38)	88 (31)	80 (27)	74 (23)	103 (39)
Mean maximum °F (°C)	57.6 (14.2)	57.2 (14.0)	67.0 (19.4)	80.9 (27.2)	91.1 (32.8)	92.9 (33.8)	95.1 (35.1)	92.9 (33.8)	90.1 (32.3)	79.0 (26.1)	69.0 (20.6)	60.1 (15.6)	97.0 (36.1)
Mean daily maximum °F (°C)	34.1 (1.2)	37.4 (3.0)	45.6 (7.6)	58.9 (14.9)	70.1 (21.2)	78.7 (25.9)	84.1 (28.9)	82.4 (28.0)	74.6 (23.7)	62.1 (16.7)	50.0 (10.0)	39.3 (4.1)	59.8 (15.4)
Daily mean °F (°C)	25.6 (−3.6)	28.2 (−2.1)	36.5 (2.5)	48.2 (9.0)	58.9 (14.9)	68.1 (20.1)	73.8 (23.2)	72.2 (22.3)	64.3 (17.9)	52.2 (11.2)	41.5 (5.3)	31.4 (−0.3)	50.1 (10.1)
Mean daily minimum °F (°C)	17.1 (−8.3)	19.0 (−7.2)	27.4 (−2.6)	37.5 (3.1)	47.7 (8.7)	57.6 (14.2)	63.6 (17.6)	62.1 (16.7)	54.1 (12.3)	42.3 (5.7)	32.9 (0.5)	23.5 (−4.7)	40.4 (4.7)
Mean minimum °F (°C)	−1.5 (−18.6)	2.0 (−16.7)	9.5 (−12.5)	26.5 (−3.1)	37.1 (2.8)	46.9 (8.3)	55.7 (13.2)	51.7 (10.9)	40.0 (4.4)	29.2 (−1.6)	19.7 (−6.8)	6.8 (−14.0)	−4.6 (−20.3)
Record low °F (°C)	−26 (−32)	−29 (−34)	−18 (−28)	13 (−11)	25 (−4)	34 (1)	36 (2)	40 (4)	28 (−2)	13 (−11)	4 (−16)	−20 (−29)	−29 (−34)
Average precipitation inches (mm)	2.44 (62)	2.73 (69)	3.45 (88)	3.33 (85)	3.38 (86)	4.04 (103)	3.30 (84)	3.35 (85)	3.72 (94)	3.88 (99)	3.48 (88)	3.29 (84)	40.39 (1,026)
Average precipitation days (≥ 0.01 in)	10.0	9.5	10.8	11.4	12.4	12.8	11.1	10.3	9.2	11.0	10.3	10.7	129.5
Source: NOAA (mean maxima and minima 2006–2020)

== Demographics ==
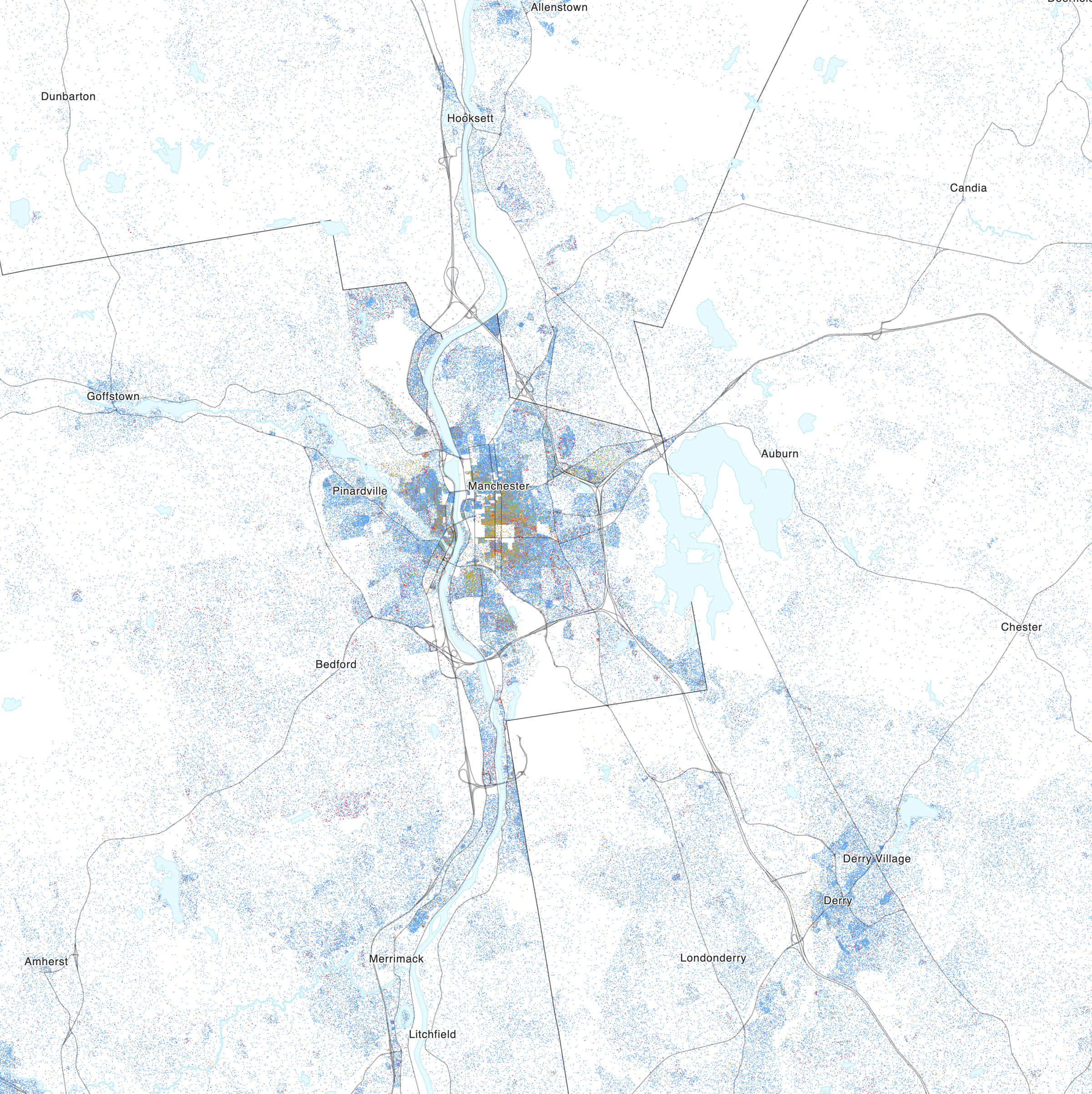
Map of racial distribution in Manchester, 2020 U.S. census. Each dot is one person: ⬤ White ⬤ Black ⬤ Asian ⬤ Hispanic ⬤ Multiracial ⬤ Native American/Other

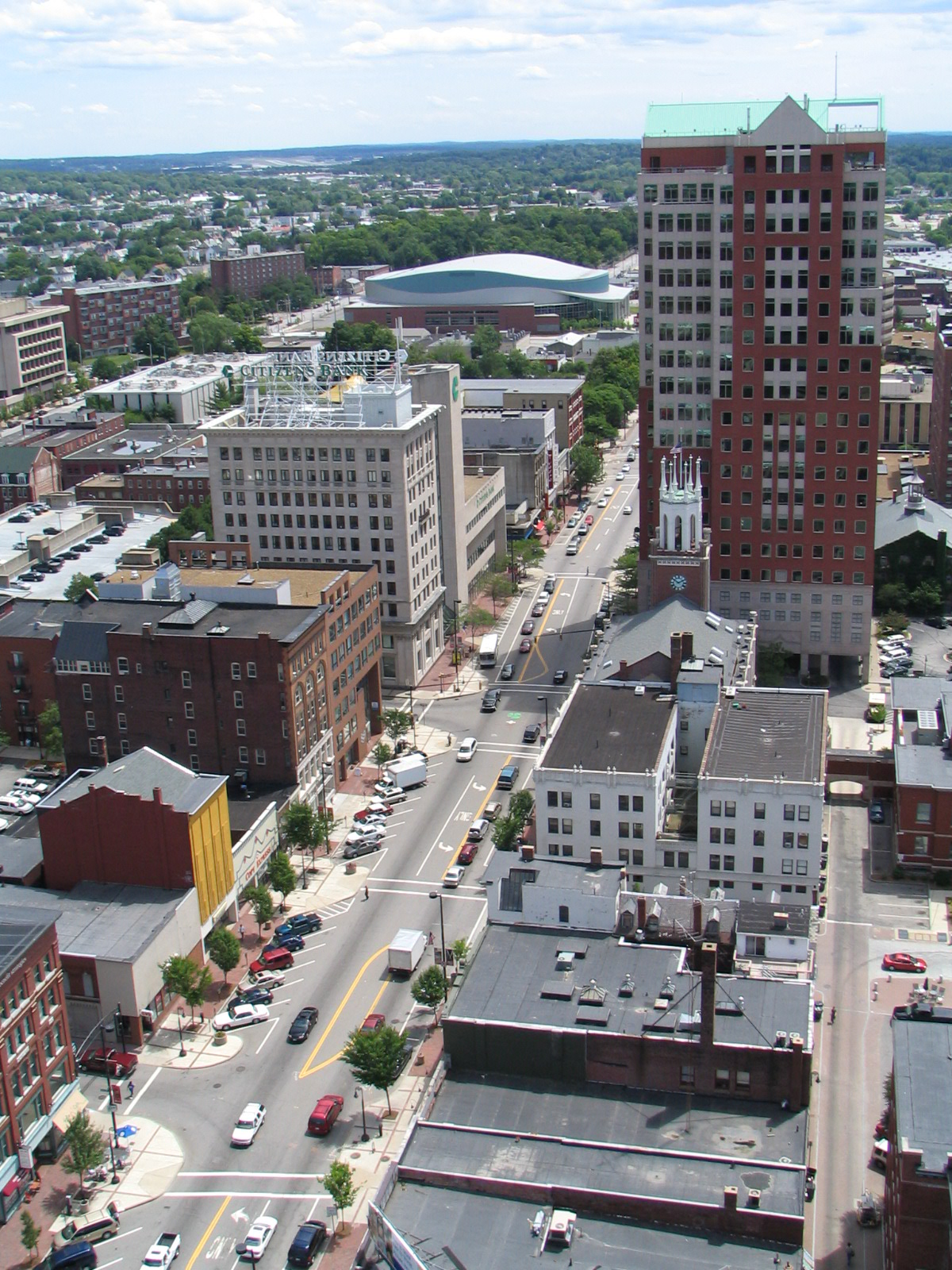
Downtown Manchester looking south along Elm Street

The city is the center of the Manchester, New Hampshire, New England City and Town Area (NECTA), which had a population of 187,596 as of the 2010 census. As of the 2020 census, the city had a population of 115,644. The Manchester-Nashua metropolitan area, comprising all of Hillsborough County, with a population of 422,937 at the 2020 census, is home to nearly one-third of the population of New Hampshire.

As of the 2010 census, there were 109,565 residents, 45,766 households, and 26,066 families in the city. The population density was 3,320.2 inhabitants per square mile (1,281.9/km^{2}). There were 49,288 housing units at an average density of 1,493.6 per square mile (576.7/km^{2}). The racial makeup of the city was 86.1% White, 4.1% Black or African American, 0.30% Native American, 3.7% Asian, 0.1% Pacific Islander, 3.1% from some other race, and 2.7% from two or more races. Hispanic or Latino of any race were 8.1% of the population. Non-Hispanic Whites were 82.0% of the population, down from 98.0% in 1980.

In 2011, the largest ancestry groups within the city's population were: French and French-Canadian (23.9%), Irish (19.5%), English (9.9%), German (8.6%), and Italian (8.1%).

Historical population
Census	Pop.	Note	%±
1790	362		—
1800	557		53.9%
1810	615		10.4%
1820	761		23.7%
1830	877		15.2%
1840	3,235		268.9%
1850	13,932		330.7%
1860	20,107		44.3%
1870	23,536		17.1%
1880	32,630		38.6%
1890	44,126		35.2%
1900	56,987		29.1%
1910	70,063		22.9%
1920	78,384		11.9%
1930	76,834		−2.0%
1940	77,685		1.1%
1950	82,732		6.5%
1960	88,282		6.7%
1970	87,754		−0.6%
1980	90,936		3.6%
1990	99,332		9.2%
2000	107,006		7.7%
2010	109,565		2.4%
2020	115,644		5.5%
2024 (est.)	116,386		0.6%
U.S. Decennial Census

Manchester, New Hampshire – Racial and ethnic composition Note: the US Census treats Hispanic/Latino as an ethnic category. This table excludes Latinos from the racial categories and assigns them to a separate category. Hispanics/Latinos may be of any race.
Race / Ethnicity (NH = Non-Hispanic)	Pop 2000	Pop 2010	Pop 2020	% 2000	% 2010	% 2020
White alone (NH)	95,581	89,893	85,608	89.32%	82.05%	74.03%
Black or African American alone (NH)	2,045	4,063	5,916	1.91%	3.71%	5.12%
Native American or Alaska Native alone (NH)	287	250	229	0.27%	0.23%	0.20%
Asian alone (NH)	2,470	3,993	4,797	2.31%	3.64%	4.15%
Pacific Islander alone (NH)	31	41	27	0.03%	0.04%	0.02%
Some Other Race alone (NH)	145	272	545	0.14%	0.25%	0.47%
Mixed Race or Multi-Racial (NH)	1,503	2,170	4,865	1.40%	1.98%	4.21%
Hispanic or Latino (any race)	4,944	8,883	13,657	4.62%	8.11%	11.81%
Total	107,006	109,565	115,644	100.00%	100.00%	100.00%

At the 2010 census, there were 45,766 households, out of which 26.4% had children under the age of 18 living with them, 38.4% were married couples living together, 13.1% had a female householder with no husband present, and 43.0% were non-families. Of all households 32.4% were made up of individuals, and 9.8% had someone living alone who was 65 years of age or older. The average household size was 2.34 persons and the average family size was 2.99.

In the city, 21.6% of the population were under the age of 18, 10.2% were age 18 to 24, 30.4% were 25 to 44, 26.0% were 45 to 64, and 11.8% were 65 years of age or older. The median age was 36.0 years. For every 100 females, there were 98.5 males. For every 100 females age 18 and over, there were 96.6 males.

In 2011, the estimated median income for a household in the city was $51,082, and the median income for a family was $63,045. Male full-time workers had a median income of $43,583 versus $37,155 for females. The per capita income for the city was $26,131. Of the population 14.1% and 9.6% of families were below the poverty line, along with 21.8% of persons who were under the age of 18 and 9.9% of persons 65 or older.

== Economy ==
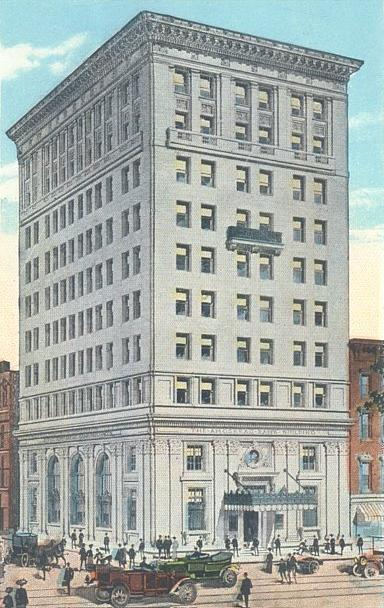
Amoskeag Bank in 1913: At 10 stories, it was Manchester's "skyscraper" for over a half-century.

Manchester is northern New England's largest city. Its economy has changed greatly, as Manchester was primarily a textile mill town throughout much of its history. Manchester is nicknamed the Queen City, as well as the more recently coined "Manch Vegas". The Mall of New Hampshire, on Manchester's southern fringe near the intersection of Interstates 93 and 293, is the city's main retail center. In 2001, the Verizon Wireless Arena, a venue seating more than 10,000, opened for major concerts and sporting events, enhancing the city's downtown revitalization efforts with a major hotel and convention center already in place across the street from the arena. The building was renamed the SNHU Arena in 2016, after Manchester's Southern New Hampshire University.

As of 2017, the following organizations and companies were the largest employers in the Manchester ZIP Code area:

- Elliot Hospital, 3,682 employees
- Catholic Medical Center, 2,600 employees
- Southern New Hampshire University, 2,093 employees
- Eversource Energy, 1,400 employees
- FairPoint Communications, 1,050 employees
- TD Bank, 900 employees
- Citizens Bank, 700 employees
- Saint Anselm College, 689 employees
- Anthem Blue Cross Blue Shield, 500 employees

In 2021, Business Insider named Manchester number 12 on its list of the 25 best cities to start a business in.

=== Downtown ===
Downtown Manchester's One City Hall Plaza stands 22 stories high, quickly followed by the all-black, 20-story Brady Sullivan Plaza, formerly known as the Hampshire Plaza. They are the tallest New England buildings north of Cambridge, Massachusetts. The Sullivan Plaza is shorter than City Hall Plaza by a mere 16 feet (4.9 m). Other major buildings include the 18-story Wall Street Apartments tower; the 14-story, recently renamed Brady Sullivan Tower, which was the former New Hampshire Insurance building; the 12-story DoubleTree Hotel and Convention Center Manchester (which serves the SNHU Arena across the street), the Carpenter Center (a former hotel), and the Hampshire Towers condominium building; the 10-story Citizens Bank Building, which was, for much of the early- and mid-20th century, Manchester's iconic Amoskeag Bank "skyscraper"; and several high-rises of or exceeding 10 stories on the city's West Side. This partial list only includes residential and commercial buildings and does not include hospitals, spires and domes, etc.

The SNHU Arena has become the centerpiece of downtown Manchester. The venue can seat slightly less than 12,000 patrons for concerts, and at least 10,000-seat configurations for sporting and other forms of entertainment. It has also hosted major recording artists and comedians, national touring theatrical productions, family-oriented shows, and fairs since it opened in 2001. The Northeast Delta Dental Stadium (formerly MerchantsAuto.com Stadium) is a baseball park on the Merrimack River in downtown Manchester and is home to the local AA baseball affiliate of the Toronto Blue Jays, the New Hampshire Fisher Cats. Historic Gill Stadium supported professional minor-league baseball into the early 21st century and continues to be a viable and popular downtown venue for many sporting and entertainment events, seating nearly 4,000 patrons, depending on the event format.

In recent years there has been continual redevelopment of the Amoskeag Millyard and its residential Historic District. The increasing popularity of downtown living has caused many properties originally built as tenement housing for mill workers in the 19th century to be converted to stylish, eclectic residential condominiums. Many new retail stores and higher education institutions, including the University of New Hampshire at Manchester, have been uniquely retro-fitted into properties along Commercial and Canal Street.

=== Shopping ===
Manchester has three main retail areas: downtown Manchester, South Willow Street (NH Route 28), and Second Street (NH Route 3A) on the West Side. The Mall of New Hampshire is on South Willow Street, and, with more than 125 stores, is one of the largest shopping centers in southern New Hampshire and central New England.

== Arts and culture ==
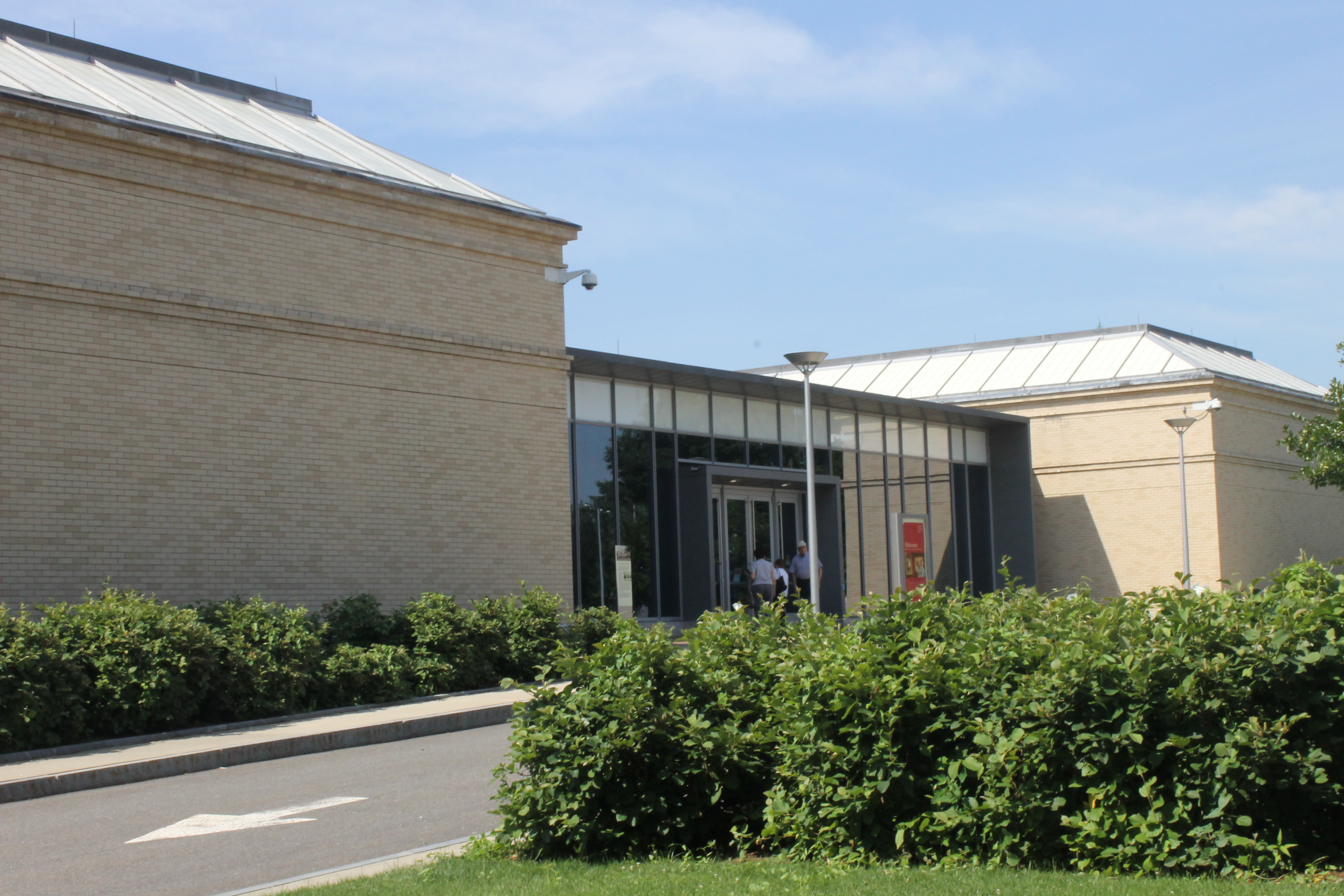
Currier Museum of Art at 150 Ash Street

Cultural landmarks include the historic Palace Theatre, the Currier Museum of Art, the New Hampshire Institute of Art, the Franco-American Center, the Manchester Historic Association Millyard Museum, the Massabesic Audubon Center, the Amoskeag Fishways Learning and Visitors Center, the Lawrence L. Lee Scouting Museum and Max I. Silber Library, the Zimmerman House and Kalil House designed by Frank Lloyd Wright, and the SEE Science Center. Valley Cemetery, the resting place of numerous prominent citizens since 1841, is an early example of a garden-style burial ground.

The John F. Kennedy Memorial Coliseum is another, smaller venue in downtown Manchester with a capacity of approximately 3,000 seats. It was completed in 1963, serves as home ice for the Manchester Central and Memorial High School hockey teams, and is home to the Southern New Hampshire Skating Club.

The nickname "ManchVegas" was derived from illegal gambling in local businesses during the late 1980s or early 1990s. Many pizza shops and local bars had video poker machines that would pay out real money. The nickname was coined following a citywide campaign of law enforcement. It was then adopted as a lampoon of the city's limited entertainment opportunities. The term has since become a source of pride as the city's entertainment scene has grown. By 2003, it was well enough known that a note on Virtualtourist.com said, "Residents reflect the regional dry humor by referring to sedate Manchester as 'ManchVegas'." By 2005, an article in Manchester's Hippo (a local alternative weekly) said that then-Mayor Robert A. Baines "is pushing to replace the nickname ManchVegas with Manchhattan" (meaning Manchester+Manhattan). In 2009, the film Monsters, Marriage and Murder in ManchVegas was released referencing Manchester's popular nickname and using much of the city as its backdrop.

Manchester has a growing collective of artists, due in large part to the influx of young students at the New Hampshire Institute of Art, Southern New Hampshire University, and the University of New Hampshire at Manchester. Slam Free or Die, New Hampshire's only weekly slam poetry venue, is in Manchester.

The Manchester City Library has served the city's residents since the mid-1850s and has been housed in the Carpenter Memorial Building on Pine Street since 1914. There is a branch location on North Main Street on the West Side.

In July 2023, former Mayor Joyce Craig declared Manchester the "Chicken Tender Capital of the World."

== Sports ==
The city is home to McIntyre Ski Area, which opened in 1971. There are also college sports teams that play in and out of the city. Saint Anselm College is located less than a mile outside the city's border in Goffstown, although it has a Manchester postal address, and Southern New Hampshire University is located primarily in Hooksett, but has its campus partially within city limits. The two colleges participate in the NCAA Division II Northeast-10 Conference, and the school with the most head-to-head victories in a school year earns the Queen City Cup.

=== Professional ===
Manchester is the only city in New Hampshire with professional sports teams. The three-time Eastern League champion New Hampshire Fisher Cats play at Delta Dental Stadium. The New Hampshire Kingz of the American Basketball Association play within the Manchester Baller's Association complex at Sundial Center.

From 2001 to 2015, the Manchester Monarchs played in the American Hockey League. In their final season in Manchester, the Monarchs won the league championship. From 2015 to 2019, the city hosted the lower-division Manchester Monarchs in the ECHL. Both teams were based at the SNHU Arena (formerly known as the Verizon Wireless Arena).

From 2002 through 2009, the arena was also the home of a professional arena football team: the Manchester Wolves of AF2.

== Government ==
Manchester is incorporated as a city under the laws of the state of New Hampshire, and operates under a strong mayoral form of government. The mayor serves as chairman of the fourteen-member Board of Mayor and Aldermen, the city's legislative body. Each of Manchester's twelve wards elects a single alderman, and two additional at-large members are elected citywide. Jay Ruais is the current mayor.

The mayor also serves as the chair of the board of school committee. Like the board of aldermen, the school board has twelve members elected by ward and two at-large members. The school board is not a city department; rather, it is a school district coterminous with the city, which obtains financing from the Board of Mayor and Aldermen.

In the New Hampshire Senate, Manchester is represented by three state senators:

- Keith Murphy (Republican-District 16): includes Manchester Ward 1
- Victoria Sullivan (Republican-District 18): Wards 5, 6, 7, 8, 9
- Patrick Long (Democrat District 20): Wards 2, 3, 4, 10, 11, 12

In the New Hampshire Executive Council, Manchester is included within the 4th District and is represented by Republican John Stephen, the city's former mayor. Manchester is included within New Hampshire's 1st congressional district and is represented by Democrat Chris Pappas.

At the presidential level, Manchester leans Democratic. George W. Bush narrowly carried the city by 170 votes in 2004, but no other presidential elections since then have been nearly as close. In 2020, Joe Biden won the highest percentage of the vote in Manchester since 1964.

Manchester city vote by party in presidential elections
Year	Democratic	Republican	Third parties	Total Votes	Difference
2024	53.31% 27,729	45.65% 23,746	1.03% 538	52,013	7.66%
2020	56.01% 29,464	42.06% 22,127	1.93% 1,015	52,606	13.95%
2016	49.95% 24,941	43.17% 21,554	6.89% 3,438	48,576	6.97%
2012	54.60% 26,227	43.60% 20,942	1.80% 864	48,033	11.00%
2008	54.86% 26,526	43.83% 21,192	1.32% 636	48,155	11.08%
2004	49.46% 23,116	49.82% 23,286	0.72% 334	46,738	0.36%
2000	49.17% 19,991	47.11% 19,152	3.72% 1,511	40,654	2.06%
1996	52.52% 20,185	38.26% 14,704	9.22% 3,544	38,433	14.26%
1992	40.91% 16,627	40.10% 16,298	18.99% 7,718	40,643	0.81%
1988	34.13% 12,567	64.89% 23,893	0.98% 359	36,819	30.76%
1984	29.23% 10,283	70.44% 24,780	0.33% 116	35,179	41.21%
1980	28.86% 10,919	62.26% 23,557	8.88% 3,360	37,836	33.40%
1976	47.50% 16,243	51.19% 17,506	1.31% 448	34,197	3.69%
1972	31.23% 12,614	67.55% 27,285	1.22% 493	40,392	36.32%
1968	52.62% 20,853	42.46% 16,828	4.92% 1,951	39,629	10.16%
1964	69.59% 29,364	30.41% 12,834	0.00% 0	42,198	39.17%
1960	63.78% 28,541	36.22% 16,207	0.00% 0	44,798	27.64%
1956	49.94% 20,599	50.03% 20,637	0.03% 12	41,248	0.09%
1952	56.71% 24,514	43.29% 18,715	0.00% 0	43,229	13.41%
1948	66.00% 25,189	33.14% 12,646	0.86% 329	38,164	32.87%
1944	67.01% 24,555	32.99% 12,087	0.00% 0	36,642	34.03%
1940	67.36% 24,774	32.64% 12,005	0.00% 0	36,779	34.72%
1936	61.76% 19,963	32.02% 10,350	6.22% 2,011	32,324	29.74%
1932	63.36% 18,556	35.85% 10,499	0.79% 230	29,285	27.51%

Manchester city election results from state and federal races
Year	Office	Results
2010	Senator	Ayotte 61–36%
2010	House	Guinta 51–45%
2010	Governor	Lynch 52–46%
2012	President	Obama 55–44%
2012	House	Shea-Porter 52–43%
2012	Governor	Hassan 55–42%
2014	Senator	Shaheen 55–46%
2014	House	Shea-Porter 52–48%
2014	Governor	Hassan 55–44%
2016	President	Clinton 50–43%
2016	Senator	Hassan 51–44%
2016	House	Shea-Porter 47–39%
2016	Governor	Van Ostern 50–45%
2018	House	Pappas 60–39%
2018	Governor	Sununu 52–46%
2020	President	Biden 56–42%
2020	Senator	Shaheen 60–37%
2020	House	Pappas 57–40%
2020	Governor	Sununu 64–33%
2022	Senator	Hassan 57–41%
2022	House	Pappas 58–41%
2022	Governor	Sununu 55–43%
2024	House	Pappas 58–41%
2024	Governor	Ayotte 51–47%

== Education ==
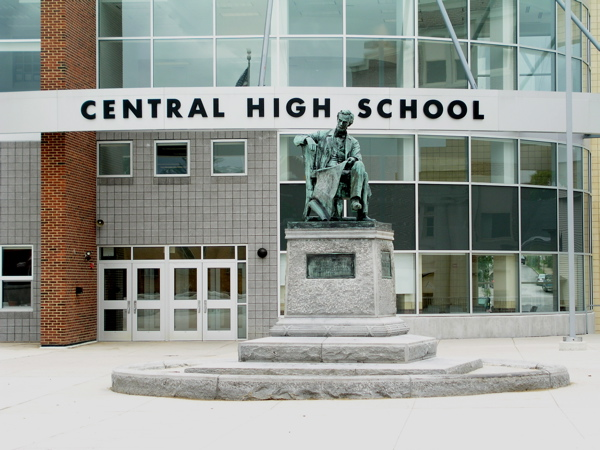
Lincoln statue by John Rogers in front of Central High School, 2005

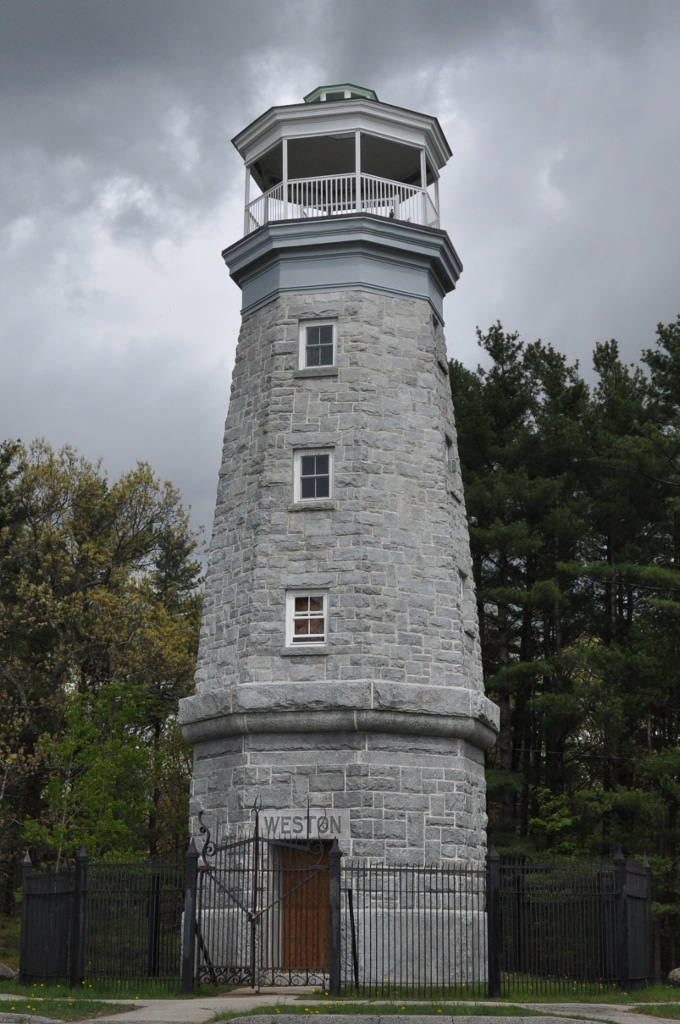
Weston Observatory in Derryfield Park, 2012

=== Public schools ===
Manchester's public school system is run by the Manchester School District. Manchester School District has four public high schools:

- Manchester High School West
- Manchester High School Central
- Manchester Memorial High School
- Manchester School of Technology

Manchester School District has four public middle schools and fourteen elementary schools.

=== Private and charter schools ===
Manchester is served by three private high schools:

- Trinity High School, a private, Roman Catholic high school
- The Derryfield School, a private school serving sixth through twelfth grades
- Holy Family Academy, a small Roman Catholic private school serving seventh through twelfth grades

There are several charter schools in the city:

- The Founders Academy, a public charter school that began in the 2014–2015 school year for children in 6th to 12th grades
- Making Community Connections Charter School Manchester Campus, also known as MC2 (M.C. Squared), a 6th to 12th grade public charter school
- Mills Falls Charter School, a public charter school offering a Montessori education from kindergarten to 6th grade
- Polaris Charter School, a public charter school that offers elementary education
- Kreiva Academy, a public charter school in downtown Manchester for 6th to 12th grades

Other schools:

- Robert B. Jolicoeur School, a private special education school
- Mount Zion Christian Schools, a non-denominational, evangelical Christian school serving kindergarten through twelfth grade
- Saint Benedict Academy, a Catholic elementary school serving kindergarten through sixth grade (formerly Saint Raphael School and Westside Regional Catholic School)
- Cardinal Lacroix School, a K–6 Catholic elementary school that combines St. Anthony School and St. Casimir School
- St. Catherine of Siena School, a Pre-K to 6th grade parochial elementary school
- St. Joseph Regional Junior High School, a grade 7–8 regional Catholic junior high school

=== Higher education ===
Area institutions of higher education, together enrolling more than 8,000 students, include:

- Franklin Pierce University, Manchester branch campus
- Hellenic American University
- Manchester Community College
- Massachusetts College of Pharmacy and Health Sciences, Manchester, New Hampshire Secondary Campus
- Southern New Hampshire University on the boundary between Manchester and Hooksett
- University of New Hampshire at Manchester, an integral college of the University of New Hampshire

Saint Anselm College, in the Pinardville neighborhood of the town of Goffstown, is adjacent to the city line and has a Manchester mailing address and telephone exchange.

== Media ==
The city is served by the New Hampshire Union Leader (formerly the Manchester Union Leader), The Hippo, and Manchester Ink Link.

=== Radio ===
The Manchester radio market, which contains Hillsborough County and portions of Merrimack and Rockingham counties, is home to the following FM radio stations:

- WEVO 89.1 (NPR, "New Hampshire Public Radio")
- WLMW 90.7 (religious programming, "New Hampshire Family Radio")
- WDER-FM 92.1 (Christian programming, "Life-Changing Radio")
- W231BR (classic hits, "Rewind 94.1")
- WMNH (Public Access - 95.3)HOME
- WZID 95.7 (adult contemporary)
- WMLL 96.5 (country music, "96.5 Live Free Country")
- WOKQ 97.5/97.9 (country music)
- WNNH 99.1 (active rock, "99.1 the Bone")
- W260CF 99.9 (News/Talk, FM translator for WFEA-AM 1370)
- WGIR-FM 101.1 (rock music, "Rock 101")
- W276BJ 103.1 (country music, "103.1 the Outlaw")
- WBNH-LP 105.1 (alternative rock, "Bedford 105-1")
- WJYY 105.5 (top 40, "105-5 JYY")
- WFNQ 106.3 (Adult Contemporary, "Frank FM, New Hampshire's Greatest Hits")
- W295BL 106.9 (classical music, simulcast of WCRB from Lowell, Massachusetts)
- WTPL 107.7 (news/talk and sports, "107.7 The Pulse of New Hampshire")

Additionally, almost all stations from Boston can be received throughout the market, along with some stations (depending on location) from Worcester, the Seacoast and/or the Lakes Region.

=== Television ===
Manchester is on the northern edge of the Boston television market. The following stations are based in Greater Manchester:

Channel	Callsign	Affiliation	Branding	Subchannels		Owner
(Virtual)	Callsign	Affiliation	Branding	Channel	Programming	Owner
9.1	WMUR-TV	ABC	WMUR ABC 9	9.2	MeTV	Hearst Television
15.1	WBTS-CD (licensed to Nashua)	NBC	NBC 10 Boston	15.2	Cozi TV	NBCUniversal
21.1	WPXG-TV (licensed to Concord)	Ion	Ion	21.2; 21.3; 21.4; 21.5; 21.6	Qubo; Ion Plus; ION Shop; QVC; HSN	Ion Media Networks
50.1	WWJE-DT (licensed to Derry)	True Crime Network				Univision Communications
60.1	WNEU (licensed to Merrimack)	Telemundo	Telemundo Boston	60.2	TeleXitos	NBCUniversal

== Infrastructure ==
=== Transportation ===
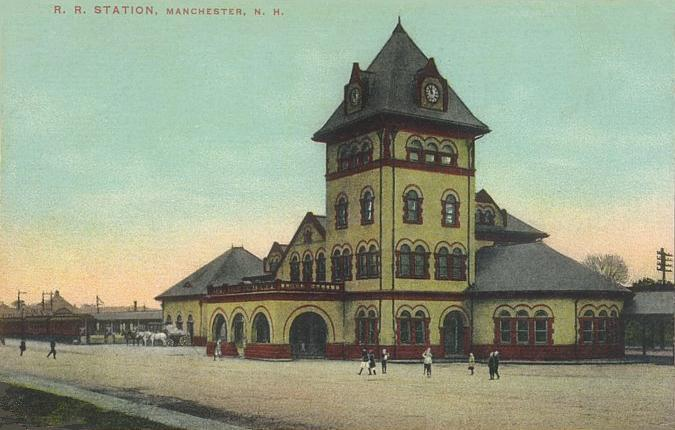
Manchester Union Station, c. 1910

==== Air ====
Manchester-Boston Regional Airport, the fourth-largest passenger and third-largest cargo airport in New England, serves the city.

==== Roads ====
Two Interstate Highways, one U.S. Route, and six New Hampshire State Routes in the city. These include:

- Interstate 93
- Interstate 293
- U.S. Route 3
- New Hampshire Route 3A
- New Hampshire Route 28
- New Hampshire Route 28A
- NH 28 Bypass, known as Londonderry Turnpike.
- New Hampshire Route 101
- New Hampshire Route 114A

==== Bus ====
The Manchester Transit Authority runs several local bus routes throughout the city and surrounding areas, and operates three regional bus routes called the Zip Line service, which offers express service from Manchester to Concord, Nashua, and Salem, New Hampshire. Greyhound Lines operates bus service between Manchester and destinations in the Northeast.

==== Passenger rail ====
Into the 1950s, numerous Boston and Maine Railroad trains operated out of Manchester Union Station, going to points northwest as far as Montreal, north to Woodsville, east to Portsmouth and south to Boston, among these the Alouette and the Ambassador (both of these being Boston - Montreal trains). The last services were a once a day train between Boston and Concord; this service ended in 1967.

A proposed extension of the MBTA Commuter Rail's Lowell Line would see MBTA Commuter Rail service running as far north as Manchester with service frequencies similar to that of the current Lowell Line. A study currently being carried out by AECOM and the State of New Hampshire to design and make a financial plan for the project is due to be completed by 2023. The proposed Manchester station location would be located behind the Market Basket grocery store on Elm Street.

With the expansion of Interstate 93 to eight lanes from Salem to Manchester under construction, space is being reserved in the median for potential future commuter or light rail service along this corridor. The I-93 transit study also suggested restoring service on the Manchester and Lawrence branch for commuter and freight rail. This corridor would support freight rail along with commuter, something that light rail cannot do.

In late 2011, Dean Kamen, inventor of the Segway and owner of several buildings in the Millyard, as well as co-founder of FIRST, proposed a rail loop for downtown and the Millyard. Several meetings have been held with area business and property owners, city officials and local developers, but the idea is in the early conceptual stages.

The downtown rail loop, if approved by the Board of Mayor and Aldermen, would be about three miles long. The loop would go from the Manchester Millyards, down south for about half a mile, then turn over Elm Street, separate into two rails (the other going towards Manchester-Boston Regional Airport), and climb north to Bridge Street, ending at the Brady Sullivan Tower at the northern end of Elm Street. More concrete plans were revealed in 2018.

In 2021, Amtrak announced plans to implement new service from Boston to Concord, including a stop at Manchester, by 2035.

=== Public safety ===
==== Law enforcement ====
Law enforcement is provided by the Manchester Police Department. The Manchester police station is at 405 Valley Street on the corner of Valley and Maple.

The Hillsborough County Department of Corrections is at 445 Willow Street. The prison houses an average of 500 inmates.

==== Fire department ====
The city of Manchester is protected all year by the 200 paid, professional firefighters (IAFF Local 856) of the City of Manchester Fire Department. The department is commanded by a Chief of Department, Ryan Cashin, one Assistant Chief, and five District Chiefs. The Manchester Fire Department operates out of ten fire stations throughout the city, and operates a fire apparatus fleet of ten engines, four ladder trucks (two staffed/two cross-staffed by the engine), one rescue, and one district chief (two if manpower permits). The Manchester Fire Department responds to over 26,000 emergency calls annually.

== Sister cities ==
- Neustadt an der Weinstraße, Germany
- Taichung, Taiwan

== See also ==
- West Side, Manchester, New Hampshire
- USS Manchester, 2 ships
