= Take Our Daughters and Sons to Work Day =

Annual event

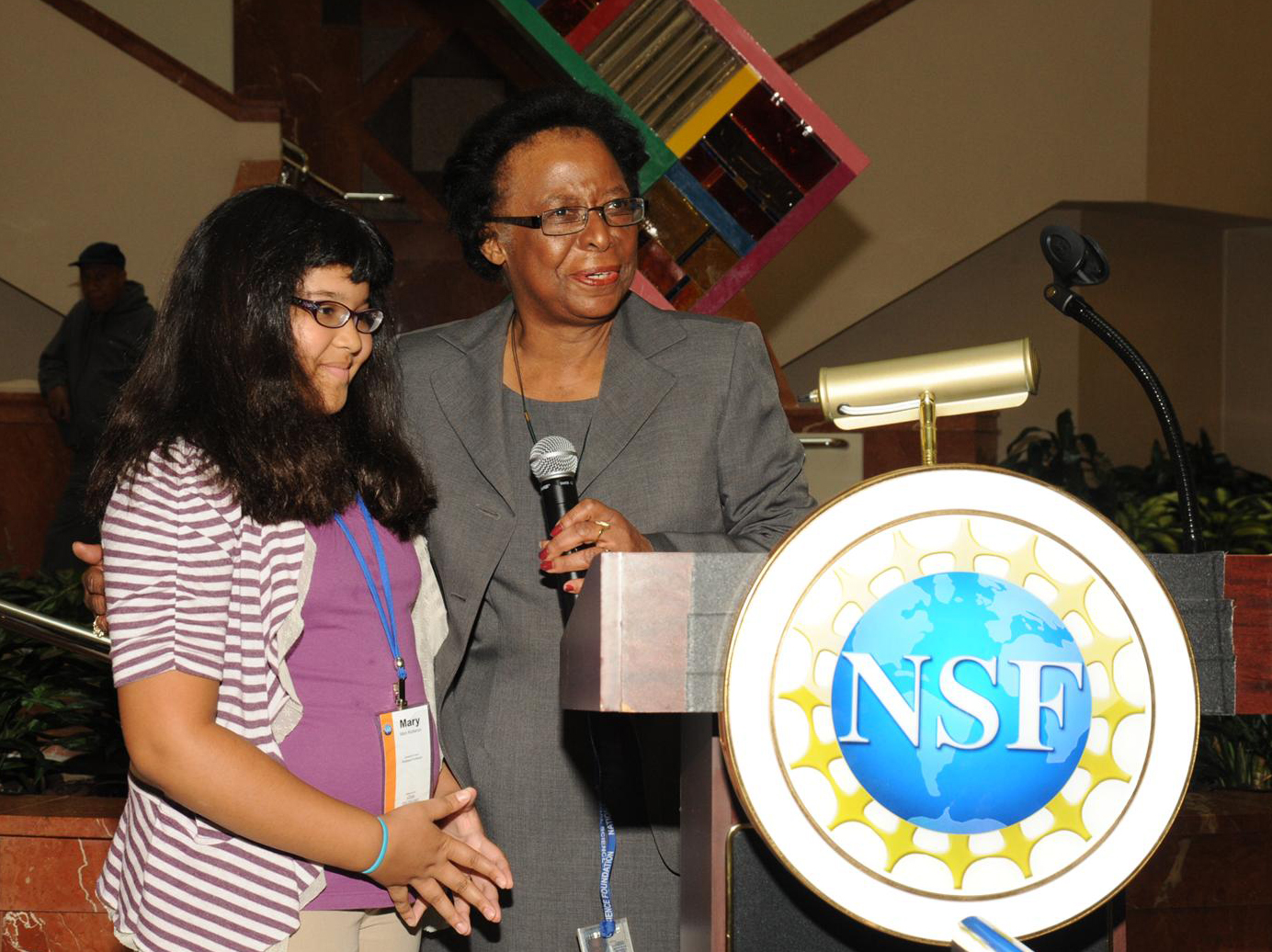
The National Science Foundation welcomed nearly 100 young people to its Arlington, Virginia headquarters on April 26, 2012, for "Take Our Daughters and Sons to Work" Day.

Take Our Daughters and Sons to Work Day, sometimes termed Take Your Child to Work Day, is an annual event in the United States where parents are encouraged to take their children to work and teach them about what they do. It was established in 1993 by the Take Our Daughters And Sons To Work Foundation, a 501(c)(3) non-profit educational organization. It is the successor to Take Our Daughters to Work Day, which aimed to make girls visible in the workplace; it was expanded to include boys in 2003. In the U.S., it occurs on the fourth Thursday in April every year.

In 2024, the event was taken over by Junior Achievement and rebranded as Take A Child To Work Day and Beyond.

In 2018, more than 37 million Americans at over 3.5 million workplaces participated.

== History ==
Take Our Daughters to Work Day was created in New York City in the summer of 1992 by the Ms. Foundation for Women and its president, Marie C. Wilson, the Women's foundation treasurer, Daren Ball, and with support from foundation founder Gloria Steinem. The first celebration took place on March 26, 1993, and has since been celebrated usually on the fourth Thursday of April in order for the 37 million children, parents, schools in over 3.5 million workplaces across the country, in addition to participants in over 200 countries around the world, to plan ahead for the annual event. The day has generally been scheduled on a day that is a school day for most children in the United States, and schools are provided with literature and encouraged to promote the program. Educators are provided with materials for incorporating career exploration into school curricula on the day before or after the event.

The program was officially expanded in 2003 to include boys; however, most companies that participated in the program had, since the beginning, allowed both boys and girls to participate, usually renaming it "Take Our Children to Work Day" or an equivalent. The program's official website states that the program was changed in order to provide both boys and girls with opportunities to explore careers at an age when they are more flexible in terms of gender roles. The Ms. Foundation also states that men who have hosted children have benefited from being seen as parental figures in addition to their roles as professionals, which can contribute to combating gender stereotypes as well.

Prior to the inclusion of boys, the Ms. Foundation contended that the program was designed to specifically address self-esteem issues unique to girls and initially resisted pressure to include boys. Much of this pressure came from educators who did not wish to include the event in their curriculum because their male students were not encouraged to participate.

In 2007, upon becoming its own separate foundation, the Take Our Daughters and Sons to Work program was turned over to Carolyn McKecuen, who took effective control as its executive director before relocating to Elizabeth City, North Carolina.

== Implementation ==
Employees across the United States and around the world typically invite their own children or relatives to join them at work, but the program particularly encourages employees to invite children from residential programs or shelters who may not be exposed to many adults in skilled professions today.

Company employee resource groups (ERGs), such as a Women in the workforce ERG or Working parents ERG, tend to sponsor "Take Our Children to Work Day" programming. In 2019, working mother advocate and Entrepreneur writer Christine Michel Carter listed three implementation benefits for the employer: worker satisfaction, increased productivity, and employee retention.

== Take Our Daughters to Work Day - UK ==
Take Our Daughters to Work Day UK (TODTW UK), was established as a charity in 1994, one year after the first event in the US. Having worked in New York with Nell Merlino, the creator of the concept, Greg Parston, Chief Executive of the Office for Public Management (OPM) in London, offered OPM as the initial organizer of the scheme in the UK.

The Day's objectives were to promote the equality of women with men by the advancement of public education in the role of women at work, to expand opportunities for women at work and to advocate the value of women in the workplace, as well as to advance the education of both girls and boys about the opportunities for employment available to them. The focus of the Day was to build confidence and to encourage girls to think more about their work options and not to limit their choices in their early years at secondary school. TODTWD UK also produced packs with special educational activities for boys, when girls were out of school for the day.

Judy Hargadon, an NHS CEO, who had been in the States as a Harkness Fellow in 1993 and had taken her 10-year old daughter to the TODTW event that year, was appointed Chair of TODTW UK. Raina Sheridan of OPM was the charity's Project Director and later became Chair.

A number of businesses across the UK gave supported the charity including Helene Curtis, BT, Body Shop and the Gatsby Trust, as well as OPM. Many other organizations across the public, private and charitable sectors provided hosting opportunities, including the BBC, the NHS, John Laing, ScotRail, NatWest, ICI and the London Fire Brigade.

In 1997, the charity was renamed Our Daughters and Sons Charitable Trust, with the objective 'to carry on the business of promoting public education and to provide and develop education opportunities within the workplace'. The change enabled the charity to fundraise for activities to support boys' special needs with more of a focus on emotional, rather than career, development.

In 2000 the charity closed due to lack of funding, and its resources were transferred to a national UK organization.

== See also ==
- Job shadow
- Take Our Kids to Work Day - the Canadian version of the event
