= Squad (U.S. Congress) =

Progressive faction in the U.S. House of Representatives

The Squad
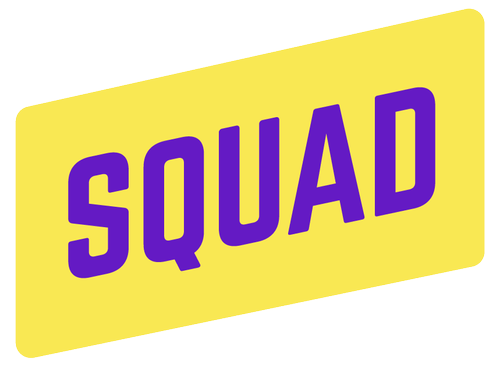
- Founders: Alexandria Ocasio-Cortez; Ilhan Omar; Ayanna Pressley; Rashida Tlaib
- Ideology: Progressivism; Left-wing populism; Faction: Democratic socialism
- Political position: Left-wing
- National affiliation: Democratic Party; Working Families Party; Democratic Socialists of America
- Seats in the House Democratic Caucus: 7 / 214
- Seats in the House: 7 / 435

The Squad is an informal progressive and left-wing faction of the Democratic Caucus in the U.S. House of Representatives. Members of the Squad are all members of the Congressional Progressive Caucus. The Squad comprises the furthest left faction of the Democratic Caucus.

The Squad was initially composed of four members elected in the 2018 United States House of Representatives elections: Alexandria Ocasio-Cortez of New York, Ilhan Omar of Minnesota, Ayanna Pressley of Massachusetts, and Rashida Tlaib of Michigan. The grouping expanded to six following the 2020 United States House of Representatives elections, with newly elected Jamaal Bowman of New York and Cori Bush of Missouri joining. Following the 2022 elections, the squad grew to nine with the addition of Greg Casar of Texas, Summer Lee of Pennsylvania, and Delia Ramirez of Illinois. After the 2024 elections, the group reduced to seven, as Bowman and Bush were defeated in their primaries and left at the beginning of the 119th Congress.

The Squad's members have been supported by the Justice Democrats political action committee, and are on the left wing of the Democratic Party. Ocasio-Cortez, Pressley, Bush and Bowman were initially elected to Congress after unseating incumbents in primary challenges. All but Lee represent seats with Cook Partisan Voting Index scores of at least D+20. Geographically, all but the Texan Casar hail from the Midwestern United States or Northeastern United States. All but Omar, Pressley, and Ramirez are currently or formerly affiliated with the Democratic Socialists of America.

The Squad has been said to represent the advocacy of progressive policies such as Medicare for All, the Green New Deal, and tuition-free college, which the party leadership may not support. Ocasio-Cortez coined the name "Squad" in an Instagram post a week after the 2018 election. The photo, taken at a VoteRunLead event where the four founding members spoke, subsequently went viral. The grouping has since officially adopted the moniker by launching the Squad Victory Fund, a political action committee.

== Name ==
The colloquial use of the word "squad" arose from East Coast hip hop culture and describes "a self-chosen group of people that hope you want to identify with them". Its use by Ocasio-Cortez signaled familiarity with millennial slang as a playful reference to youth social cliques. Hip-hop originated in her home borough, The Bronx. Musical acts with "Squad" in their names and lyrics have existed since the 1990s.

The New York Times considers the Squad sui generis, not fitting neatly into the usual congressional groups: the gang (a bipartisan group focused on particular legislation) or the caucus (a pressure group based on special interests). It notes that the term has a militaristic connotation, conveying values of self-defense, allegiance, and having "something important to protect". Some Republicans have used the moniker pejoratively, but the four original women use it to express solidarity among themselves and with supporters. For example, the Justice Democrats quoted Pressley saying: "We are more than four people... Our squad includes any person committed to creating a more equitable and just world." Before new members joined the original 2018 elected members, President Trump referred to the Squad as "AOC+3".

The average age of the Squad was 38.3 as of mid-2019, nearly 20 years under the overall House average age of 57.6.

== History ==
=== 2018 election ===
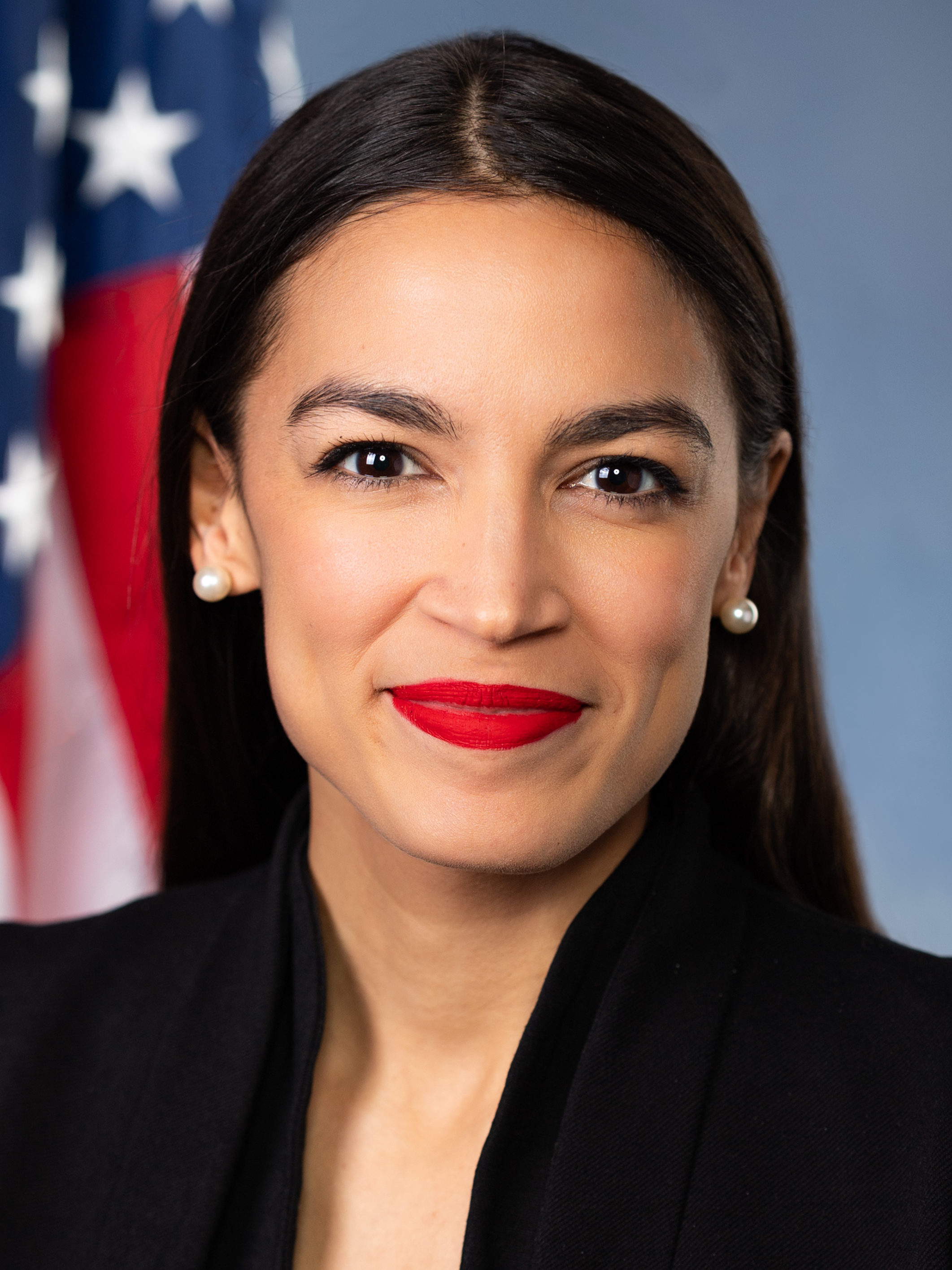
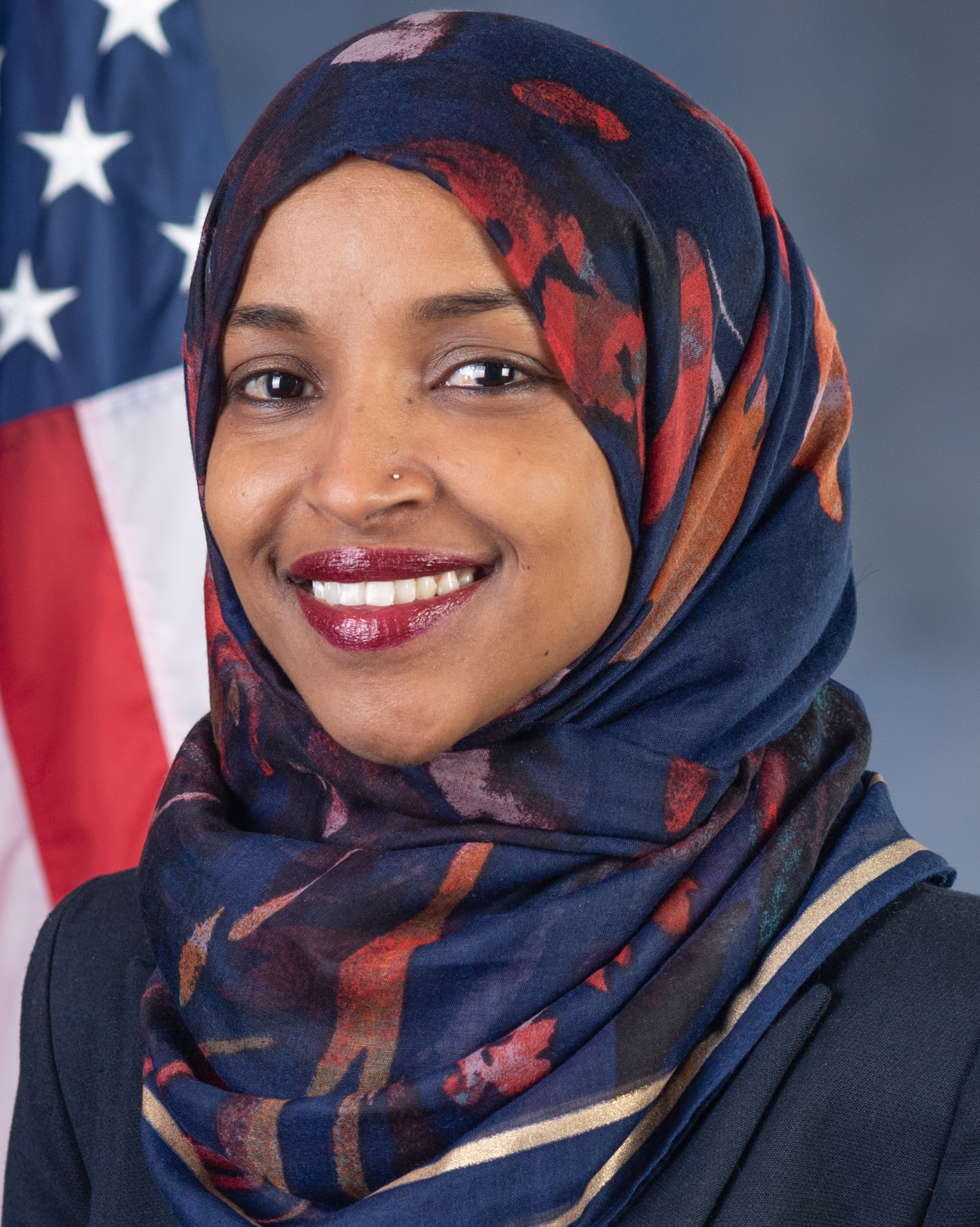
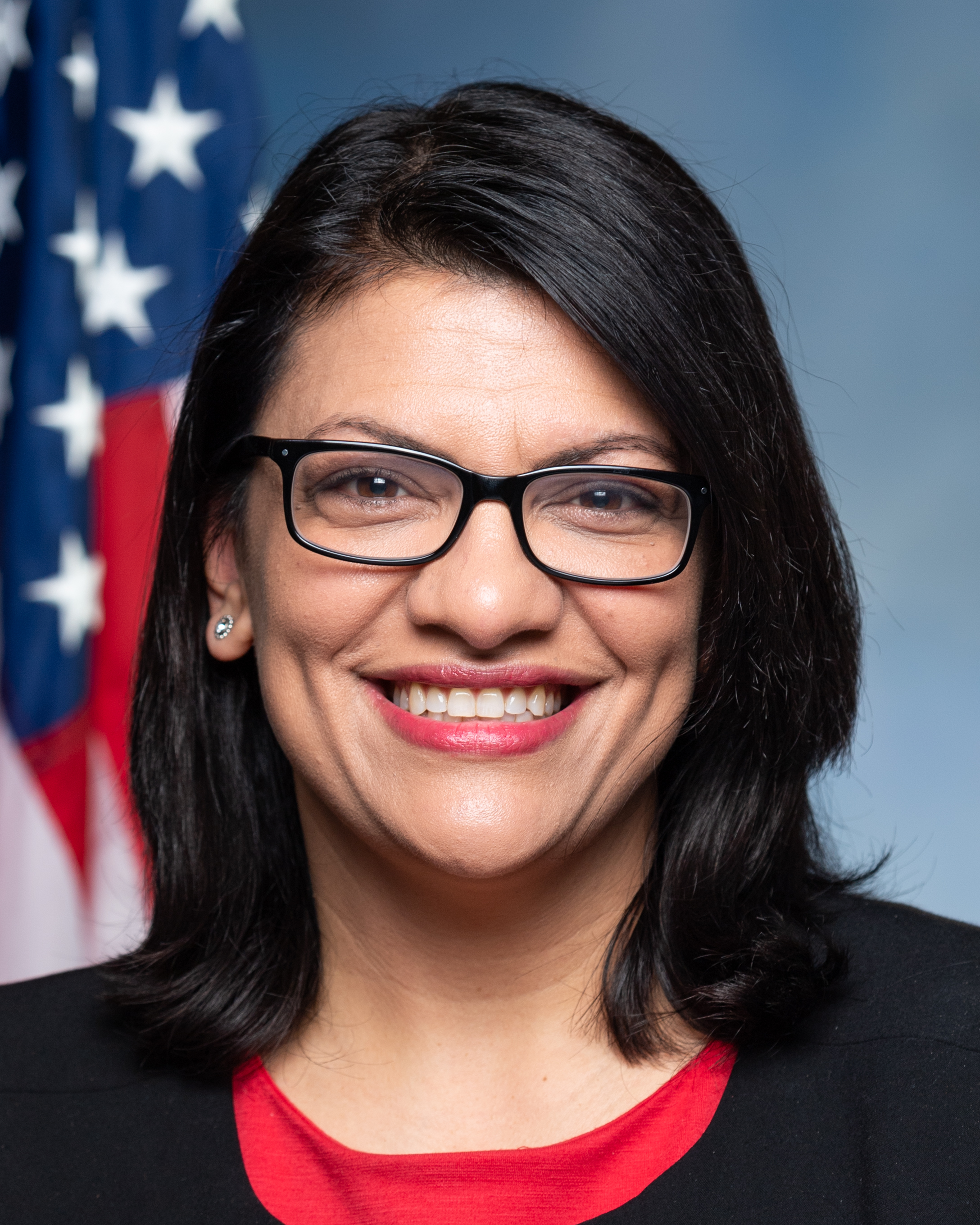
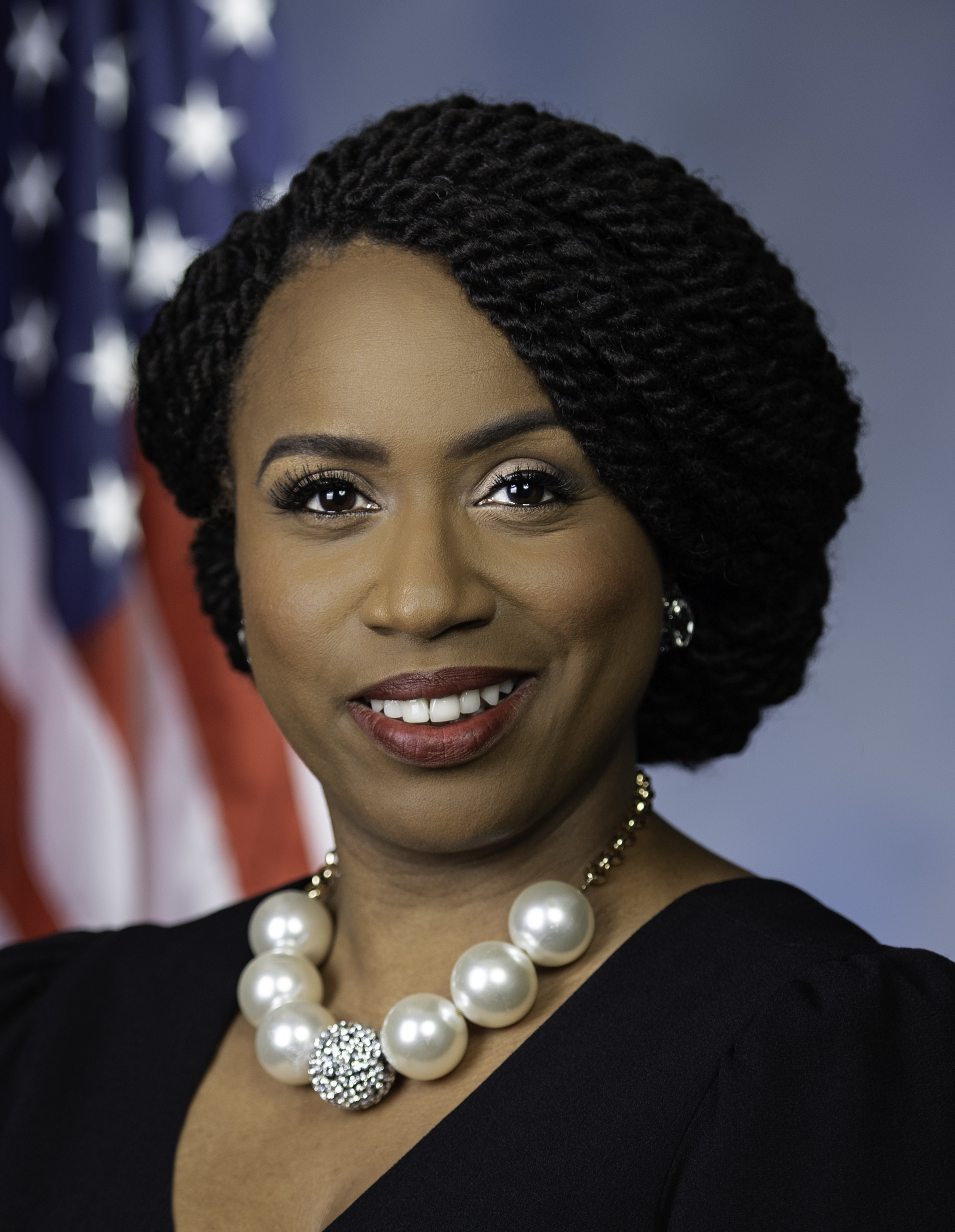
Founding members (clockwise from top left)
- Alexandria Ocasio-Cortez, NY-14
- Ilhan Omar, MN-5
- Ayanna Pressley, MA-7
- Rashida Tlaib, MI-12

Ocasio-Cortez and Pressley unseated Joe Crowley and Mike Capuano, respectively, in primary elections. Omar won the seat previously held by Democrat Keith Ellison, who retired from the House to successfully run for Attorney General of Minnesota, and Tlaib won the seat once held by Dean of the House John Conyers, who resigned in 2017 after nearly 53 years in Congress. At least three Squad members provided fundraising and volunteer assistance during the other members' campaigns.

=== 116th Congress ===
According to Pressley, she and Ocasio-Cortez had met before Freshman Orientation Week for the 116th United States Congress. During that event a week after Election Day, on November 12, 2018, all four Squad members participated in a livestreamed interview with Jodi Jacobson from Rewire.News, organized by VoteRunLead, and took a group picture. Ocasio-Cortez published the picture on Instagram, labeling it "Squad"; Pressley published it on her Instagram story the same day. The next day, they had already attracted negative attention in conservative media, as Laura Ingraham of Fox News called them "the four horsewomen of the apocalypse". The four women, known for their social media savvy, regularly defend each other's policies and remarks.

After publication, Ocasio-Cortez's Squad photo became a viral phenomenon, and public figures, notably New York Times columnist Maureen Dowd and White House counselor Kellyanne Conway, began using "The Squad" to refer collectively to the four women. Dowd had used the term in an interview with House speaker Nancy Pelosi, who criticized the Squad collectively without naming them. Another photo of the three members who served on the House Oversight Committee during Michael Cohen's testimony also got viral attention.

On July 14, 2019, President Donald Trump tweeted that the members of the Squad should "go back and help fix the totally broken and crime infested places from which they came. Then come back and show us how it is done". The insinuation that people of color are foreign was widely viewed as racist; three of the four are American-born and the fourth (Omar) became a naturalized citizen in her youth. On July 15, the four women responded in a press conference, saying, "We are here to stay."

On July 16, the House of Representatives condemned Trump's remarks in H.Res. 489. Over the following days, Trump continued to attack the four Squad members, saying at a July 17 campaign rally: "They never have anything good to say. That's why I say, 'Hey if you don't like it, let 'em leave, let 'em leave.' ... I think in some cases they hate our country." While Trump criticized Omar, the North Carolina crowd chanted, "Send her back, send her back!" Trump also falsely claimed that the four had used the term "evil Jews"; none of them has been reported to have used the term. The same day, the Republican Party launched a political advertisement against the Squad, titled "Squad Goals: Anarchy" and focusing on the Squad's role in the Abolish ICE movement.

A CBS News and YouGov poll of almost 2,100 American adults conducted from July 17 to 19 found that Republican respondents were more aware than Democratic respondents of the four Squad members. The congresswomen had very unfavorable ratings among Republican respondents and favorable ratings among Democratic respondents. In a New York Times opinion piece the historian Barbara Ransby wrote, "The squad has tilled new ground in reanimating a fighting spirit within the Democratic Party and revived its left flank."

In July 2019, the Illinois Republican County Chairmen's Association called the four women the "Jihad Squad" in a Facebook post that was later deleted. Illinois Republican Party Chairman Tim Schneider condemned "evoking race or religion as the basis for political disagreement".

In August 2019, Israel blocked Omar and Tlaib from visiting the country, a reversal of Israeli Ambassador to the United States Ron Dermer's July statement that "any member of Congress" would be allowed in. A spokesman for Israeli Interior Minister Arye Deri attributed the ban to Omar and Tlaib's support for BDS (Boycott, Divestment and Sanctions). A spokesman for Israeli Prime Minister Benjamin Netanyahu said that Omar and Tlaib intended only to visit the Palestinian Territories and had not scheduled a meeting with any Israeli politicians. Less than two hours before the ban, President Trump had tweeted that for Israel to allow the visit would "show great weakness" when Omar and Tlaib "hate Israel & all Jewish people". Omar responded that Netanyahu had caved to Trump's demand and that "Trump's Muslim ban is what Israel is implementing". Tlaib described the ban as "weakness". American legislators from both parties criticized the ban and requested that Israel withdraw it. Trump applauded the ban while continuing his criticism of Omar and Tlaib, calling them "the face of the Democrat Party, and they HATE Israel". A day after the ban was imposed, Tlaib was granted permission to enter Israel to visit her family on the condition that she "committed to accept all the demands of Israel to respect the restrictions imposed on her in the visit" and "promised not to advance boycotts against Israel during the visit". In response, she said she would not visit Israel, tweeting that doing so would "stand against everything [she] believe[s] in—fighting against racism, oppression, and injustice".

=== 2020 election ===
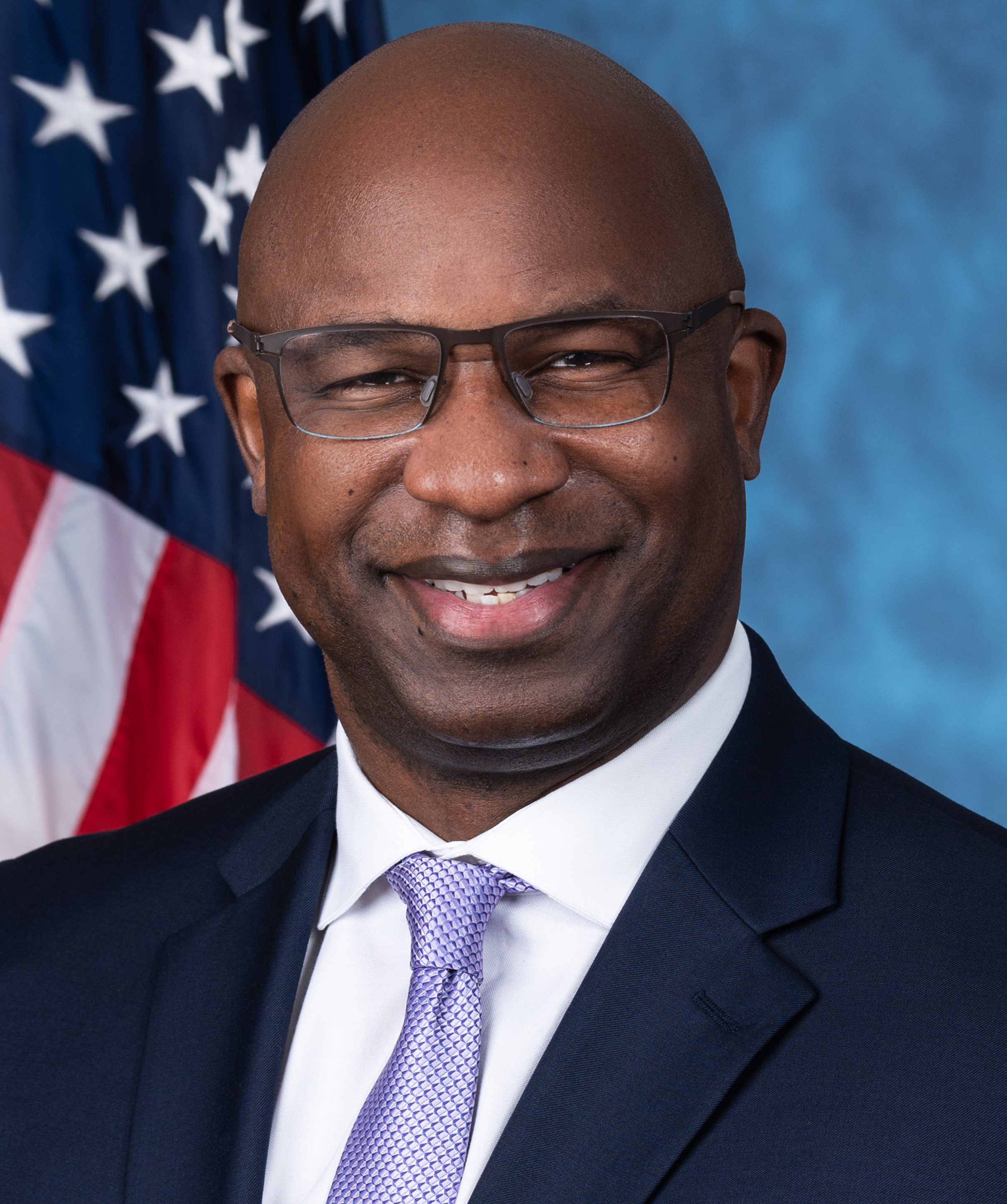
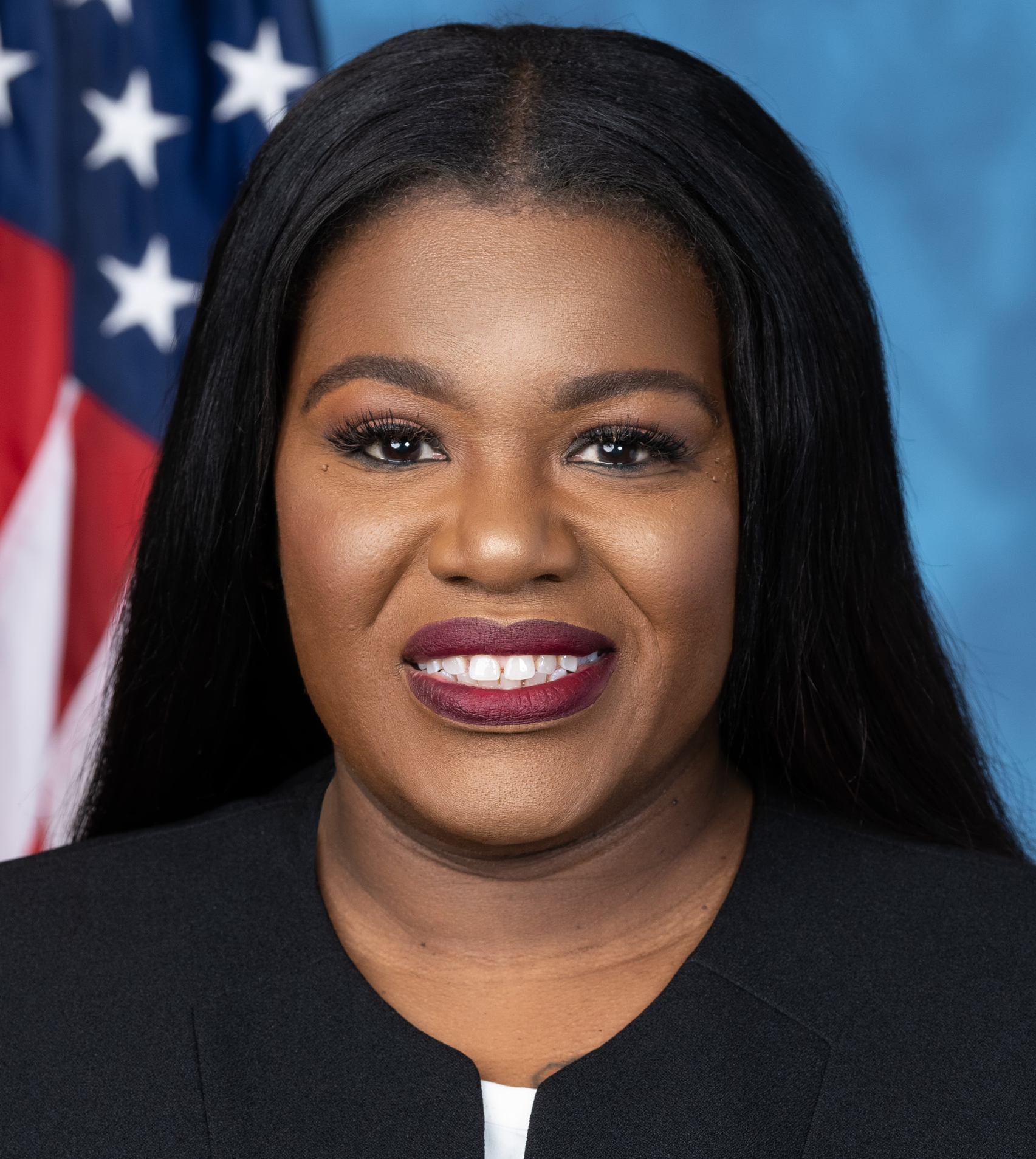
2020 election additions:
- Jamaal Bowman
- Cori Bush

Ocasio-Cortez, Omar, and Tlaib endorsed Bernie Sanders for president in 2020. Pressley endorsed Elizabeth Warren.

In July, the four set up "The Squad Victory Fund", a joint action committee, to raise money for their campaigns and other progressive campaigns.

All four members again won the Democratic nomination in their districts. Pressley was unchallenged in her primary, while Ocasio-Cortez, Tlaib, and Omar defeated challengers, including Tlaib's House predecessor, Brenda Jones, by large margins.

On January 3, 2021, Cori Bush and Jamaal Bowman joined the Squad at the start of the 117th United States Congress. Both defeated incumbent Democrats in their primaries—Lacy Clay and Eliot Engel, respectively. Bush posted a photo on Twitter of herself, Bowman, and the four original Squad members with the caption "Squad up."

=== 2022 election ===
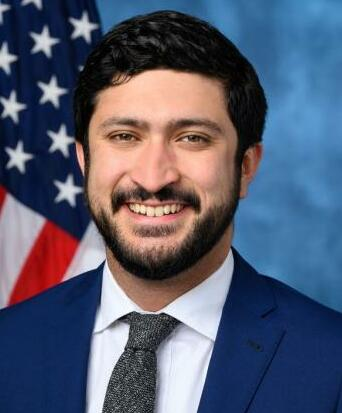
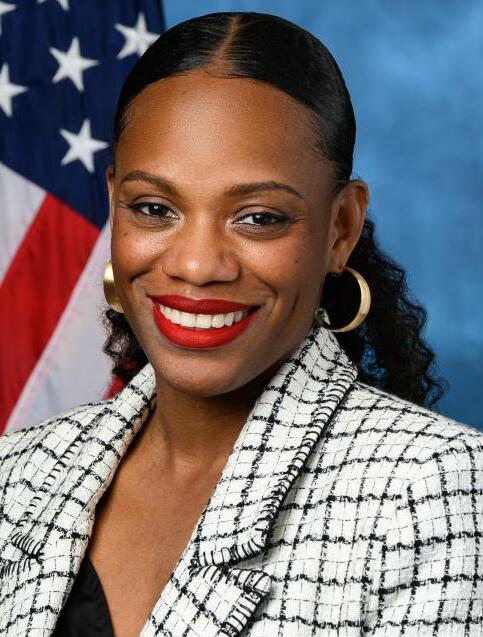
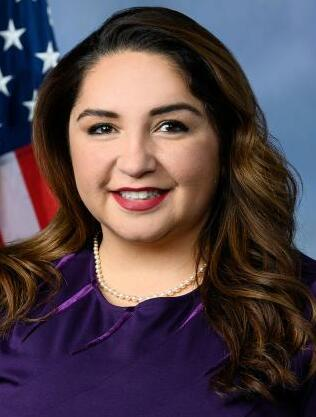
2022 election additions:
- Greg Casar, TX-35
- Summer Lee, PA-12
- Delia Ramirez, IL-3

All six members won the Democratic nomination in their districts. Pressley was again unopposed, as was Ocasio-Cortez, while Tlaib, Bush, and Bowman all garnered over 60% of the vote in their primaries. Omar faced significant opposition from establishment-oriented local officials in her district, most notably Minneapolis Mayor Jacob Frey. Omar had endorsed a challenger in Frey's 2021 reelection campaign. Despite the backlash, Omar won her primary by a 2.1% margin.

After Casar and Lee won their primaries, it was reported that they would join the Squad as well. Ramirez was identified in 2024 as a member of the Squad in campaigns by Justice Democrats and Progressive Democrats of America, and embraced the label.

=== 2024 election ===
Bowman lost the primary to George Latimer, becoming the first Squad member to lose their seat.

Bush became the second Squad member to be defeated, losing the primary to Wesley Bell.

Both were hurt by their stances on Israel, which resulted in AIPAC supporting their challengers. However, it was noted that both had vulnerabilities that the other seven did not, such as Bowman's censure for knowingly activating a false fire alarm in Congress and Bush's alleged misuse of federal security money. Bush has threatened revenge against AIPAC once "untied from the strings of Congress". AIPAC did not support Omar's primary opponent, former Minneapolis City Council member Don Samuels, even though Samuels had won 48% of the vote in the 2022 primary without their backing. He received 43% in 2024.

All members of the Squad endorsed Kamala Harris for president in 2024 except Tlaib, who did not issue an endorsement.

== Political positions ==
The Squad is generally considered to be a progressive and left-wing faction of the Democratic Caucus in the U.S. House of Representatives. The Squad comprises the furthest-left wing faction of the Democratic Caucus.

Squad members generally hold political views considered to be on the left, on subjects such as immigration detention facilities, Islamophobia, universal health care, human rights, the Israel–Palestine conflict, and climate change. This section lists some beliefs typical of Squad members.

=== Climate change ===
In November 2020, the Squad protested outside the Democratic National Committee headquarters because then President-elect Joe Biden did not support the Green New Deal.

=== Islamophobia ===
Squad members such as Omar, Ocasio-Cortez, and Tlaib are outspoken against Islamophobia. In 2021, Ocasio-Cortez said, "Islamophobia is far too often tolerated and ignored."

=== Infrastructure Bill and Build Back Better Act ===
On November 5, 2021, all six Squad members voted against the Infrastructure Investment and Jobs Act because they believed that moderate Democrats in the House and Senators Joe Manchin and Kyrsten Sinema would not vote for the Build Back Better Act. Nine House Democrats had previously refused to vote for the Build Back Better Act until the infrastructure bill was signed, and both Manchin and Sinema had expressed opposition to key aspects of the Act. After resolving certain disagreements, the infrastructure bill passed the House with the votes of every Democrat (and 13 Republicans) except the members of the Squad.

=== Israel–Palestine conflict ===
According to CNN, Squad members are notable for "their criticism of the US relationship with Israel". After the beginning of the Gaza war, seven Squad members were among ten U.S. representatives to vote against a House resolution supporting Israel and condemning Hamas' attack on Israel; Pressley and Casar voted "present". The war began following the October 7 Hamas attack on Israel, which has been condemned as a terrorist attack by the European Union (EU) and at least 44 countries, including the United States.

After the outbreak of war, some Squad members criticized the Israeli government; Tlaib called Israel an "apartheid state". On July 19, 2024, the International Court of Justice (ICJ) issued a non-binding Advisory Opinion stating that Israel's legislation and measures in the West Bank and East Jerusalem impose and maintain a near-complete separation, which constitutes a breach of Article 3 of the International Convention on the Elimination of All Forms of Racial Discrimination (CERD), while refraining from determining whether this amounted to apartheid, or applying this finding to any other territory occupied by Israel or to Israel itself. Amnesty International, Human Rights Watch, and B'Tselem have each released reports accusing Israel of apartheid.

On October 16, 2023, after Israeli strikes in Gaza killed 3,000, Squad members introduced a resolution calling for "an immediate de-escalation and ceasefire in Israel and occupied Palestine" to save as many lives as possible. The resolution was endorsed by groups including IfNotNow, the Institute for Middle East Understanding, and Jewish Voice for Peace.

On July 10, 2024, the National Political Committee (NPC) of the Democratic Socialists of America (DSA) withdrew its endorsement of Alexandria Ocasio-Cortez. The NPC cited her sponsorship of a panel focused on combating antisemitism, which included Jewish leaders, arguing that it "conflated anti-Zionism with antisemitism" and describing her sponsorship as "a deep betrayal". The decision also referenced her vote in favor of a House resolution reaffirming Israel's right to exist, condemning the Hamas-led attack, and stating that "denying Israel's right to exist is a form of antisemitism", which the NPC criticized for "conflating opposition to Israel's right to exist with antisemitism".

=== Leadership positions ===
Since the formation of 'the Squad' members of the group have advanced leadership positions within the Congressional Progressive Caucus as well as leadership positions in the Democratic Caucus.

On December 5, 2024 the Progressive caucus unanimously voted Greg Casar to be chair of the caucus. Ilhan Omar was re-elected as Deputy chair of the caucus, a position she has held since 2023. Delia Ramirez and Rashida Tlaib both currently serve as Vice chairs of the caucus.

Although Alexandria Ocasio-Cortez does not currently hold any leadership positions, she previously held two leadership positions on two committees she served in the 118th congress as ranking member on the Subcommittee on Energy and Mineral Resources and vice ranking member on the Oversight and Government Reform committee. She ran to be ranking member on the Oversight and Government Reform committee in the 119 congress, after previous ranking member Jamie Raskin got elevated to be ranking member on the House Judiciary Committee. She lost the position to Gerry Connolly by a 131 to 84 vote on a secret ballot after the vote was brought to a full Democratic caucus vote.

=== Supreme Court reform ===
During a 2024 House Oversight Committee Democrats Discussion on Supreme Court Ethics convened by Representatives Ocasio-Cortez and Jamie Raskin, Ocasio-Cortez said that the U.S. Supreme Court had been "captured and corrupted by money and extremism", causing a "crisis of legitimacy" that threatened the stability of U.S. democracy, and that "House Democrats are committed to informing the public about why the court's conservative super majority is rolling back critical economic freedoms, civil rights, and environmental protections, and what we can do about it". Pressley renewed her calls for Supreme Court expansion, a binding code of ethics for justices, and investigations into Justices Samuel Alito, Clarence Thomas, and Brett Kavanaugh for "their acceptances of lavish, secret gifts from right-wing megadonors". Lee stressed the need for Supreme Court ethics reform.

During a speech on the House floor, Tlaib called for impeachment of Alito and Thomas for "accepting bribes and doing the bidding of right-wing extremists", and called for expanding the Supreme Court and enacting term limits for justices. Omar and other representatives introduced the Judicial Ethics Enforcement Act of 2024 to create an Office of the Inspector General empowered to conduct investigations of alleged violations of the Code of Conduct for Justices of the Supreme Court. In 2023, Bush and other representatives had introduced the Judiciary Act of 2023, calling for expansion of the Supreme Court. Bush also called for Thomas's impeachment and Alito's resignation.

=== Campaign finance reform ===
Members of the Squad have pushed for campaign finance reform. They have supported efforts to overturn the Citizens United v. FEC Supreme Court decision and "bar corporations from political spending for ten years after being convicted of a crime".

== Membership ==
The four original members of the Squad had already been discussed as a group, even before the name was widely adopted. However, according to Mediaite, the news media currently uses "Squad" to refer to the group "almost exclusively".

Starting membership in election cycles
| Election year | Democratic seats | ± |
|---|---|---|
| 2018 | 4 / 235 | New |
| 2020 | 6 / 222 | ▲2 |
| 2022 | 9 / 213 | ▲3 |
| 2024 | 7 / 215 | ▼2 |

=== Current members ===
Current Squad members
| Photo | Member | Born | District | Prior experience | In office |
|---|---|---|---|---|---|
| | Alexandria Ocasio-Cortez | October 13, 1989 (age 37); New York City, New York | New York 14 (D+25) | Organizer, Bernie Sanders for President (2016) | 2019 – present |
| | Ilhan Omar | October 4, 1982 (age 44); Mogadishu, Somalia | Minnesota 5 (D+29) | Minnesota House of Representatives (2017–2019) | 2019 – present |
| | Ayanna Pressley | February 3, 1974 (age 52); Cincinnati, Ohio | Massachusetts 7 (D+35) | Boston City Council (2010–2019) | 2019 – present |
| | Rashida Tlaib | July 24, 1976 (age 50); Detroit, Michigan | Michigan 12 (D+23) | Michigan House of Representatives (2009–2014) | 2019 – present |
| | Greg Casar | May 4, 1989 (age 37); Houston, Texas | Texas 35 (D+21) | Austin City Council (2015–2022) | 2023 – present |
| | Summer Lee | November 26, 1987 (age 38); Pittsburgh, Pennsylvania | Pennsylvania 12 (D+8) | Pennsylvania House of Representatives (2018–2022) | 2023 – present |
| | Delia Ramirez | June 8, 1983 (age 43); Chicago, Illinois | Illinois 3 (D+20) | Illinois House of Representatives (2018–2022) | 2023 – present |

=== Former members ===
Former Squad members
| Photo | Member | Born | District | Prior experience | In office |
|---|---|---|---|---|---|
| | Jamaal Bowman | April 1, 1976 (age 50); New York City, New York | New York 16 (D+25) | Schoolteacher, school principal | 2021–2025 |
| | Cori Bush | July 21, 1976 (age 50); St. Louis, Missouri | Missouri 1 (D+29) | Nurse, pastor, activist | 2021–2025 |

=== Suggested members ===
==== 2020 election cycle ====
After the 2020 election cycle, it was suggested that Marie Newman, who successfully challenged an incumbent member of the House of Representatives in IL-03 with Justice Democrats' backing, as well as Mondaire Jones, who was initially challenging an incumbent in NY-17 and subsequently won the primary after the incumbent announced her retirement, were thought of as potentially members of the Squad. However, both Newman and Jones were defeated in primary elections the subsequent cycles and were never members of the Squad. Ritchie Torres, who won an open primary in NY-15 in the 2020 election cycle, was another person named as a potential member, but Torres said he had "no intention of joining The Squad".

==== 2022 election cycle ====
Becca Balint and Maxwell Frost, who were both elected in safe Democratic seats in 2022, were also named as potential Squad members but have never officially joined the group.

==== 2024 election cycle ====
Lateefah Simon, who was elected to CA-12 in 2024, was considered as a potential Squad member. However, she declined, saying in an interview with The Oaklandside that "I'm not a squad member. I am a little older than those sisters. I'm a grandmother, but I sit with them. Those are my very close friends, and we pretty much vote consistently together."

==== 2026 election cycle ====
During the 2026 midterm election cycle, several Democratic primary winners have been named as potential additions to the Squad. This has included Frederick Haynes III in TX-30, Chris Rabb in PA-03, Adam Hamawy in NJ-12, Claire Valdez in NY-07, Brad Lander in NY-10, Darializa Avila Chevalier in NY-13, Melat Kiros in CO-01, and Donavan McKinney in MI-13. Analilia Mejia, who was elected to NJ-11 in a 2026 special election, was also named as a potential Squad member, though Mejia herself has dismissed being labeled as such. According to Axios, this expanded group of left-wing candidates has been referred to informally as "The Bloc".
