= Sally Brown (disambiguation) =

Sally Brown is a fictional character in the comic strip Peanuts by Charles Schulz.

Sally Brown may also refer to:

- Sally Boynton Brown (born 1975/1976), American political strategist
- Sally Brown (horse) (1982–2000), British Thoroughbred racehorse and broodmare
- Sally Brown (athlete) (born 1995), Paralympian athlete from Northern Ireland
- Sally Brown (band) (2004-today), Spanish 2Tone&Ska band
- "Sally Brown", a song by Cuban-Jamaican singer Laurel Aitken, later covered by Bad Manners
