= Vote Run Lead =

American nonprofit organization

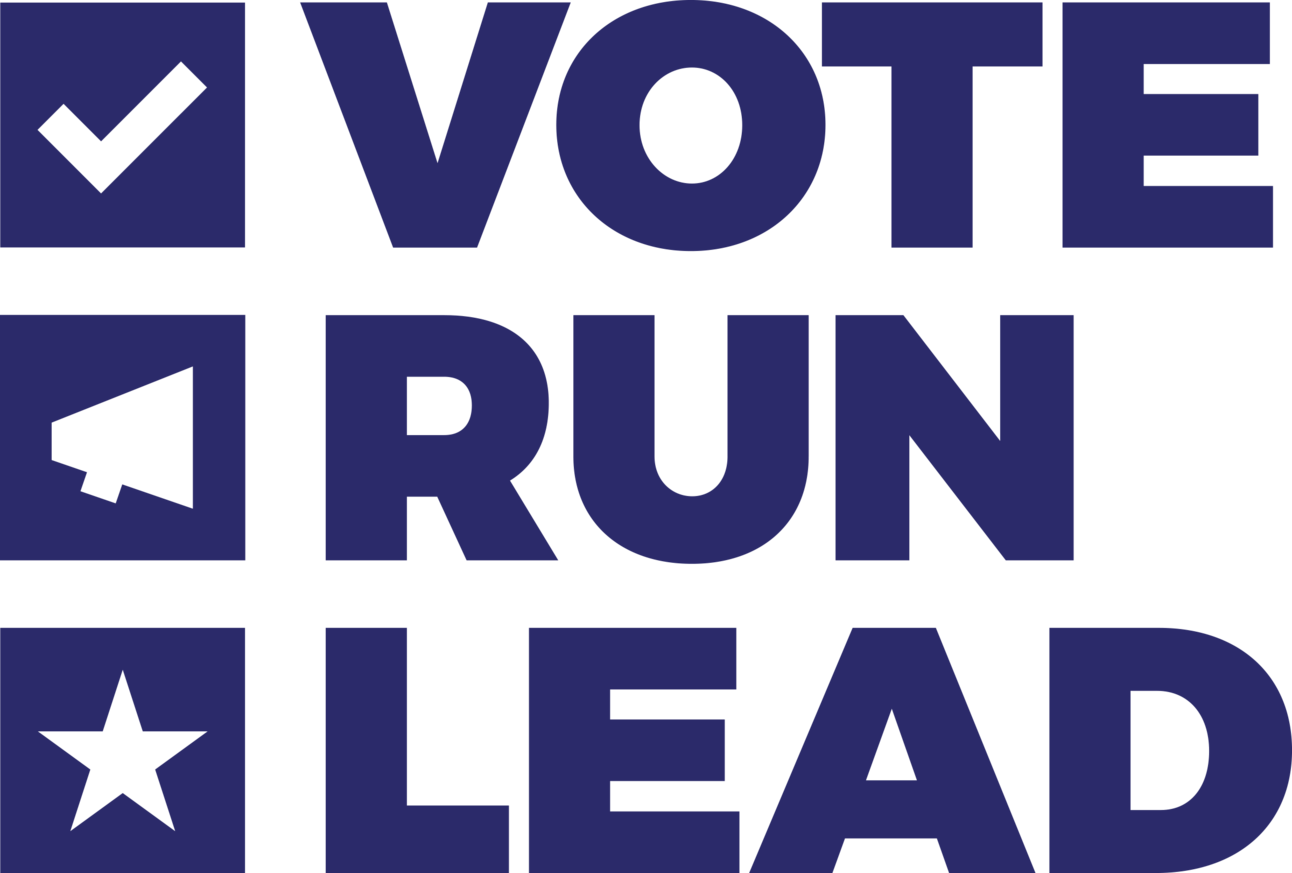
- Founder: Erin Vilardi
- Type: 501(c)(3)
- Co-founders: Rhonda Briggins, Shannon Garrett, Pakou Hang, Liz Johnson
- Board of directors: Stephanie Berger, Vanessa Cooksey, Jehmu Greene, Crystal Patterson
- Website: voterunlead.org

Vote Run Lead is a 501(c)(3) nonprofit organization that trains women to run for office in the United States. Founded in 2014 by Erin Vilardi with co-founders Rhonda Briggins, Shannon Garrett, Pakou Hang and Liz Johnson, it is nationally recognized as the largest, most diverse candidate training program for women.

Vote Run Lead is non-partisan and focuses on state and local offices. The organization reports it has trained more than 55,000 women, nearly 60% of whom are women of color and 20% of whom are from rural areas.

== History ==
Vote Run Lead was first launched in 2004 by Marie C. Wilson and Erin Vilardi as a program of the White House Project, establishing the largest national political training program readying women for public office and training more than 15,000 women to run for office and seek out leadership opportunities in their civic life. After The White House Project closed, Vote Run Lead was founded as a standalone organization in 2014 by Erin Vilardi with Rhonda Briggins, Shannon Garrett, Pakou Hang and Liz Johnson.

The organization's Board of Directors has included Jehmu Greene, Crystal Patterson, Rhonda Briggins and Shannon Garrett.

The organization's Advisory Board has included Erika Alexander, Piper Perabo and Bre Pettis as well as former Republican Congresswoman Susan Molinari, co-founder of Black Voters Matter LaTosha Brown and New York City's Commissioner for International Affairs, Penny Abeywardena in 2020.

Melinda French Gates included Vilardi in her article "5 of the most interesting conversations she had in 2020" and again in a 2023 article for Fortune about "5 women who inspire me."

A photo of Representatives Ilhan Omar, Ayanna Pressley, Rashida Tlaib and Alexandria Ocasio-Cortez at Vote Run Lead's Women & Power: National Town Hall went viral after Ocasio-Cortez posted it on her Instagram page. The photo, captioned "Squad", served as a reminder that the incoming 116th Congress is the "most female, most diverse ever, both racially and ideologically."

In 2023, the organization introduced training programs for campaign managers, as well as candidates.

== Notable alumnae ==
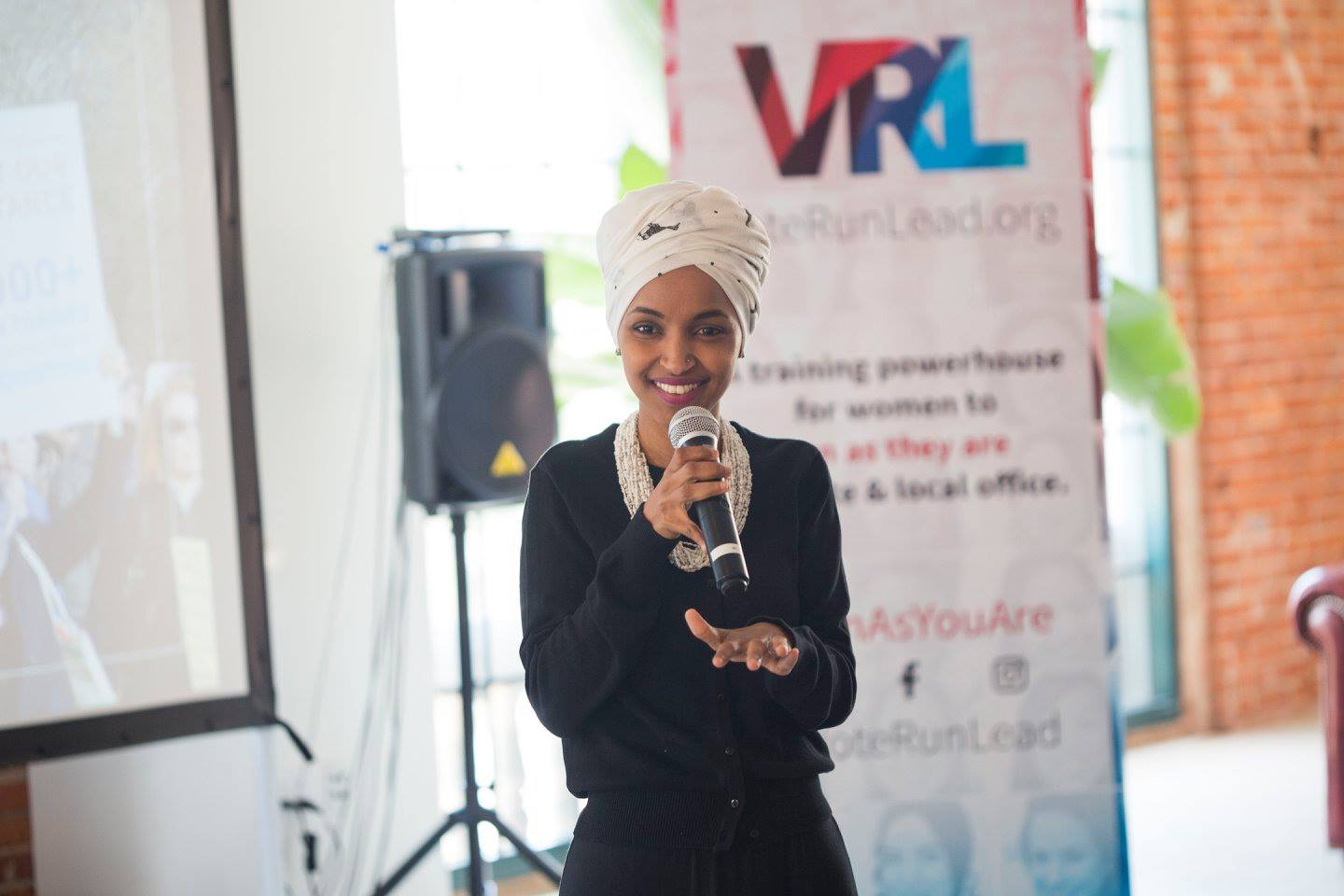
State Rep. Ilhan Omar speaking at a VoteRunLead training in 2018

- Lori Alhadeff, Broward County School Board Member and mother of Alyssa Alhadeff, killed at Marjory Stoneman Douglas High School
- Congresswoman Cori Bush was elected to the U.S. House of Representatives for Missouri's 1st congressional district in 2020
- State Representative Park Cannon, elected at 24 years old, is the first openly queer woman elected to Georgia State Assembly
- Councilwoman Catherine Emmannuel is the first Latina and youngest woman elected to the Eau Claire City Council
- Liuba Grechen Shirley, 2018 Democratic Party nominee for Congress representing the NY-2 district
- Tishaura Jones, City Treasurer of St. Louis, MO
- State Representative Brenda Lopez is first Latina elected to the Georgia State Assembly.
- State Representative Ilhan Omar, the first Somali American woman to be elected to any state legislature in the country.
- Kelda Roys, 2018 Democratic candidate for Governor of Wisconsin
- Representative Lauren Underwood, (D-IL), Illinois 14th Congressional district
- State Representative JoCasta Zamarripa is the first Latina and openly bisexual legislator elected to the Wisconsin State Assembly

== See also ==
- Emily's List
- Center for American Women and Politics
- Represent Women
- FairVote
