= Sara K. Gould =

- Born: Grand Haven, Michigan, United States
- Education: Grand Valley State University, Harvard University
- Movement: Feminist
- Board member of: National Immigration Law Center, Proteus Fund

Sara K. Gould is a feminist leader, philanthropist and activist in the United States. She served as president and CEO of the Ms. Foundation for Women from 2004 to 2010. She is a vice chair on the board of directors of the National Immigration Law Center and serves on the board of the Proteus Fund.

== Biography ==
Gould grew up in Grand Haven, Michigan with five brothers and sisters. She was raised in a Christian background and as a young person was very involved in the church. Later, as an adult, she became "much more secular." In 1973, she graduated with a bachelor's degree in political science from Grand Valley State University. Gould was married at age twenty and she followed her husband to Syracuse where he was attending law school. During her time in Syracuse, she began to see that she was following his dream instead of her own. Gould realized that she was "viewing her life through the prism of gender" and shortly after she left her marriage and went to graduate school at Harvard University. She received her master's degree in city and regional planning from Harvard in 1977.

== Work ==
After graduating from Harvard, Gould went to work in Massachusetts with Community Development Corporations (CDCs), but she didn't feel fulfilled by the work. In 1983, the Women's Action Alliance in New York called Gould to work on a project with them involving women's economic development.

At the time, the Women's Action Alliance and the Ms. Foundation for Women shared space in the same building. In 1986, Gould joined the Ms. Foundation. Gould began to identify economic development organizations throughout the country and began a grassroots program to help women identify their own seats of economic power.

In 1988, Gould started the Institute for Women's Economic Development under the Tufts University umbrella.

In 1990, she created the Collaborative Fund for Women's Economic Development (CFWED), one of the first of its kind in the country. Gould relates that at the time, "the words 'women' and 'economic development' were not put in the same sentence; they were almost like an oxymoron." The project involved multiple funders to pool money together into a larger sum in order to lower individual groups' risk. There were several "anchor" funders who contributed half a million each, such as the Levi Strauss Foundation and the Charles Steward Mott Foundation. The CFWED allowed the Ms. Foundation to give out fifteen large grants for the first time.

She contributed the piece "Owning the Future: Women Entrepreneurs" to the 2003 anthology Sisterhood Is Forever: The Women's Anthology for a New Millennium, edited by Robin Morgan.

Gould served as president for the Ms. Foundation starting in 2004. During her time as president, she expanded grantmaking to further include community project that emphasized sustainable change. When Hurricane Katrina hit in 2005, she immediately reacted by establishing the Katrina Women's Response Fund which granted $3 million in funds to organizations in Louisiana and Mississippi which helped low income women and women of color rebuild their communities.

She has also been a contributor to the Huffington Post.

In 2011, Gould was a visiting fellow at the Foundation Center where she worked with Atlantic Philanthropies for two years providing research and activities on social justice philanthropy.

After her time at the Foundation Center, she served as associate director of Caring Across Generations, a campaign to help those provide long-term home care, from April 2012 to January 2014.
