= Ms. Foundation for Women =

U.S. non-profit organization

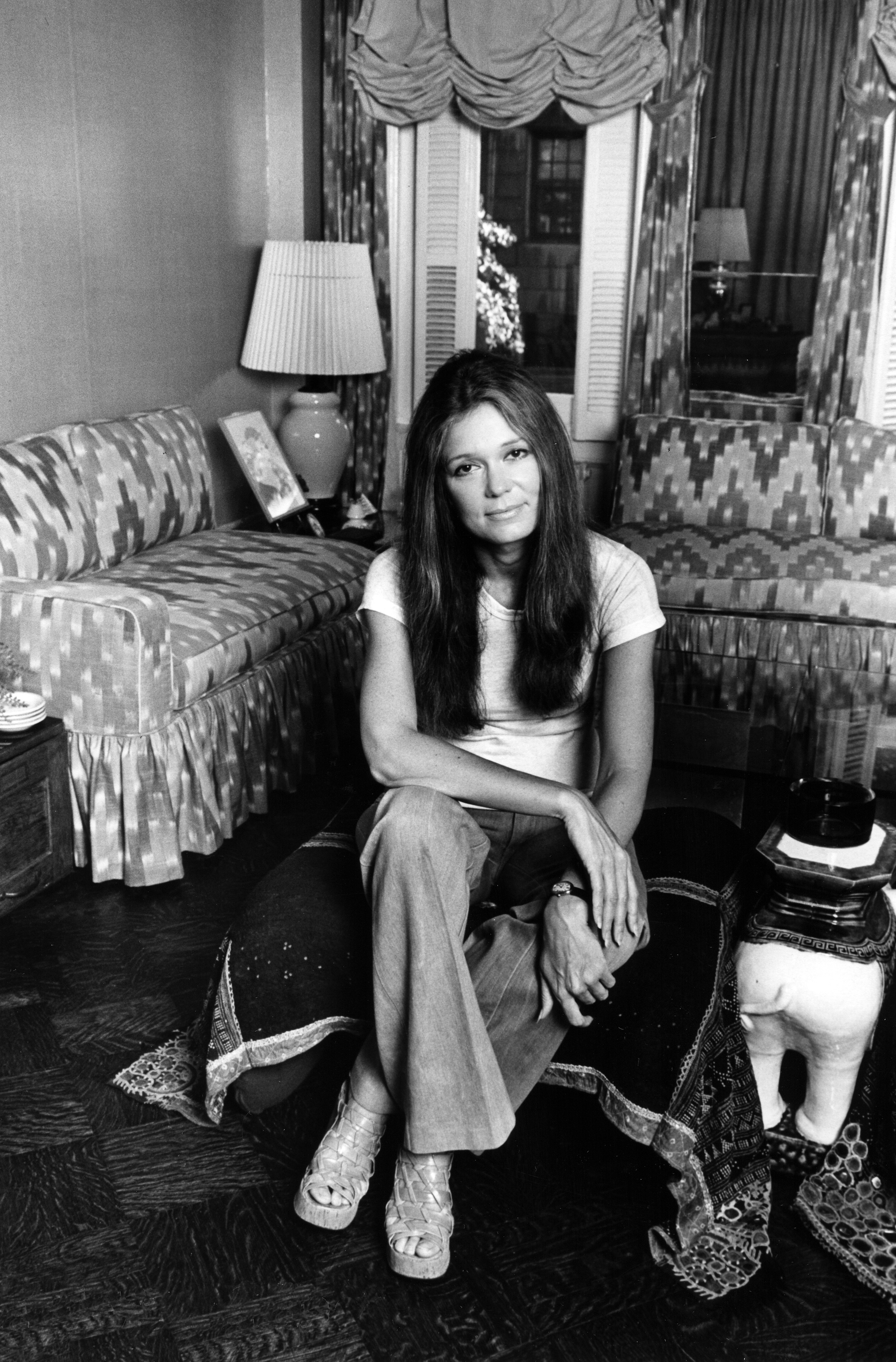
- Gloria Steinem, one of the foundation’s founders; picture taken by Lynn Gilbert
- Formation: 1972
- Founder: Gloria Steinem, Patricia Carbine, Letty Cottin Pogrebin and Marlo Thomas
- Type: Non-profit organization
- Headquarters: Brooklyn, New York
- Website: forwomen.org

The Ms. Foundation for Women is a non-profit organization for women in the United States that was founded in 1972 by Gloria Steinem, Patricia Carbine, Letty Cottin Pogrebin, and Marlo Thomas. The organization was created to deliver strategic resources to groups which elevated women's and girls' voices and solutions across race and class in communities nationwide, working to identify and support emerging and established groups poised to act when and where change is needed. Its grants—paired with skills-building, networking and other strategic opportunities—enable organizations to advance women's grassroots solutions across race and class and to build social movements within and across three areas: Economic Justice, Reproductive Justice and Safety. The organization also focuses its lobbying efforts on the state-level around those three areas.

== Founding ==
Steinem, Carbine, Pogrebin and Thomas wanted to foster the collective power of women and believed that women who faced discrimination and inequity in their own lives had the wisdom and expertise to advance social change that would benefit everyone. The Ms. Foundation was planned to seed and strengthen women's grassroots organizing around the country to create an inclusive movement in which everyone's voice was visible and heard. The Ms. Foundation for Women was created as a separate but related entity to Ms. magazine. The original intent was that Ms. magazine's profits would be redistributed to the national women's movement. It quickly became apparent, however, that the Ms. Foundation would have to raise funds and provide direction for itself; and that for Ms. magazine to survive, it would also have to sustain itself. Since 1987 the Ms. Foundation and Ms. Magazine have been separate entities: Ms. Magazine is published by the Feminist Majority Foundation.

== Personnel ==
The founding group initially did most of the work for fund-raising for the Ms. Foundation until in 1975, a full-time executive director was hired. Sara K. Gould joined the Ms. Foundation in 1986 and created the Collaborative Fund for Women's Economic Development (CFWED). Marie Wilson became the Ms. Foundation president in 1984 and under her leadership, the foundation's annual budget increased significantly, from $400,000 to $10 million by 2004.

In 2000, the Ms. Foundation added men to the board in order to diversify their group and because the foundation sees men as important allies to helping women in their struggles. Those who opposed this decision were afraid that inviting men to be part of the board would indicate that the foundation was less supportive of women. However, those who supported the move pointed out that both men and women must work together to make lasting change. The foundation continued to build on the kind of change enacted with inviting men to the board. By 2007, Ms. Foundation was funding programs that supported women, girls and also coed programs that had "a clear vision for how boys and men as allies with girls and women can work together."

Sara K. Gould served as president and CEO of the Ms. Foundation from 2004 to 2010. She was appointed president in 2004 following Wilson's resignation. In 2008, the Ms. Foundation moved its headquarters from Manhattan to Brooklyn due to rising costs for rent in Manhattan.

Anika Rahman was inducted as the president and CEO of the Ms. Foundation for Women in February 2011. Rahman was noted for helping to update the website for the foundation, giving it a "fresher" look. In Spring 2014 the Ms. Foundation announced that Teresa C. Younger would become its new President and CEO in June. Younger has stated that one of her main goals for the future of the foundation is to diversify their philanthropy.

During the Ms. Foundation’s annual Women of Vision Awards in New York City in April 2026, Tracy Sturdivant was announced as the 10th President and CEO.

== Grants ==
The foundation has played a role in funding both women and girls in the United States through their grants. The Ms. Foundation board "fully embraces the idea that deep diversity is fundamental to effective grant making." In 2004, the foundation gave out $3.8 million in grants.

== Programs ==
In 1988, it created The Institute for Women's Economic EmPOWERment, the only national training ground for economic development and justice organizers working on women's issues; in 1989, the Foundation started the Reproductive Rights Coalition and Organizing Fund; support organizations working on women's health issues at the state level. The foundation has held an annual program called the Gloria Awards (named for Ms. founder Gloria Steinem) since 1988. When the Ms. Foundation first began the awards, Wilson, the current president relates that "people said, 'No one will come out to see women leaders get an award.'" The award went on to defy critics, drawing media attention and with the event full of supporters.

The foundation established Take Our Daughters To Work Day. The first was held in 1993 and was created by former president Marie Wilson. In 1996, it was reported that between seven and ten million girls aged 9 to 17 participated in the day. The impetus for creating the day was based on studies which showed that girls' self-esteem and confidence dropped during those ages. While there was discussion about including boys, and in 1994 and 1995, boys were included, many women involved felt that they "dominated the event." Since 2003, the day was known as "Take Our Daughters and Sons to Work Day" and the last event that was sponsored by the Ms. Foundation took place in 2007.

An early initiative was the 1970s multimedia project Free to Be... You and Me. Other videos produced by the Ms. Foundation for Women include parody designed to raise awareness of laws protecting women and ridiculing those who vote against such laws. Another initiative was the Women of Honor trading cards produced by the foundation. These cards each featured around seventy different, diverse woman chosen to inspire girls and young women. The cards were used in conjunction with a Take Our Daughters to Work program in 1994.

In 1996, the foundation created the Collaborative Fund for healthy girls/healthy women to assist community organizations working on cutting-edge programs to support girls' leadership; in that same year, the foundation founded the Women and AIDS Fund to support organizations created by and for women affected by HIV and AIDS and the Democracy Funding Circle to provide resources to organizations developing a progressive vision and organizing to prevent the rollback of democratic rights gained through the women's and other social justice movements.

The Ms. Foundation has a program known as Collaborative Fund for Women's Economic Development (CFWED), which "brings local activists and funders together." It was created in 1986 by Gould. In 1999, the CFWED was awarded a Presidential Award for Excellence in Microfinance.

After Hurricane Katrina, the Ms. Foundation moved quickly to fund grassroots organizations who responded to the crisis. The Katrina Women's Response Fund supported low income women and women of color in order to help them rebuild their communities and homes.

In 2005, the Foundation began Public Voices, Public Policy, an initiative aimed to actively support women of color who lead grassroots organizations, and get them involved in public-policy advocacy and action.
