= The White House Project =

American non-profit organization

- Formation: 1998
- Dissolved: 2013
- Type: Non-profit organization
- Legal status: 501(c)(3)
- Purpose: Women's leadership
- Headquarters: New York City
- Region served: United States
- President: Tiffany Dufu
- Main organ: Board of Directors
- Website: http://www.thewhitehouseproject.org

The White House Project was an American non-profit organization, which worked to increase female representation in American institutions, businesses, and government. Its main programs focused on female leadership and campaign training and the portrayal of female leadership in the media.

The White House Project was founded in 1998 by Marie C. Wilson. It was headquartered in New York City and had regional offices in Colorado, Minnesota, Michigan, and Georgia. In 2013, the organization had economic troubles and closed.

== VoteRunLead ==
VoteRunLead was a program of The White House Project designed to engage women in the political process as voters, activists, and candidates through training, inspiration, and networking. The training, which included communications, fundraising, and campaigning, aimed to demystify the political process and inspire women to be leaders. The White House Project encouraged involvement through several programs such as voter education and registration, community forums and events, political leadership training, issue briefings, networking events, and movie screenings.

VoteRunLead held several "Boot Camps" to instruct women about several fields of leadership. Debate Boot Camp encouraged women to discuss and defend issues. Security Boot Camp taught material related to National Security. Fundraising Boot Camp helped women create financial plans. Strategy Boot Camp prepared women to contact voters and have field plans.

== Corporate Council ==
Founded in 2006, The White House Project's Corporate Council's purpose was to engage senior businesswomen with government policy issues, private philanthropy, academia, and business, and to facilitate engagement between senior businesswomen in the private and public sectors. Members of the council were corporate women who were active agents of change within their corporations, and who occupied, or had access to, their executive suite. Corporate Council Members included Bank of America, Barbie, Best Buy, Merrill Lynch, Morgan Stanley, and HBO.

== EPIC Awards ==
The White House Project created the EPIC (Enhancing Perceptions in Culture) Awards to honor innovators who brought positive images of women's leadership to the American public. Each April, over 400 prominent business, civic, political and entertainment leaders gathered in New York City to celebrate their accomplishments in advancing women's leadership.

=== 2002 Honorees ===
The 2002 EPIC Awards, in its inaugural year, honored those who presented positive images of women leaders in pop culture venues: Dr. Renee Poussaint, Camille Cosby, Geraldine Laybourne, Ted Nelson, Mullen Advertising, Walter Anderson, Jenifer Lewis, and Tammy Ader. Additionally, Val Ackerman was given an award for showcasing female athletes as persistent, tough, and effective.

=== 2003 Honorees ===
The 2003 honorees included many different areas of popular culture that normalized women leadership: the films Bend It Like Beckham, Blue Vinyl, Frida, The Powerpuff Girls Movie, Rabbit-Proof Fence, Real Women Have Curves, Legally Blonde 2: Red, White & Blonde, and Whale Rider; commercials from MasterCard International, McCann-Erickson WorldGroup, Reebok International Ltd., Berlin Cameron Red Cell, the Girl Scouts, and Kaplan Thaler Group; and the television series Buffy the Vampire Slayer, Charms for the Easy Life, Damaged Care, Homeless to Harvard, and The Division. Additionally, Julie Foudy, the Captain of the U.S. Women's Soccer Team, was given an award.

=== 2005 Honorees ===
The 2005 honorees included Hearst Magazine for their 2004 Election Year articles; CHISHOLM '72 - Unbought & Unbossed; Oscar winner Born Into Brothels; and TV's The West Wing.

=== 2006 Honorees ===
The 2006 honorees included actress Geena Davis, Rod Lurie, Participant Productions, and three corporate leaders: Carolyn Buck-Luce of Ernst & Young, Joann Heffernan Heisen of Johnson & Johnson and Deborah Elam of General Electric.

=== 2007 Honorees ===
The 2007 honorees were Jean King, Sheila Nevins, Barbara Kopple, Cecilia Peck, KeKe Palmer, and Nancy Hult Ganis. Awards were presented to culture changers who brought images of women's leadership to a global audience in 2007: Abigail E. Disney, Leymah Gbowee, Gini Reticker, Marjane Satrapi, Kathleen Kennedy, and Glamour magazine.

=== 2008 Honorees ===
On April 17, The 2008 EPIC Awards celebrated the 10th anniversary of The White House Project. The "Circle of 10" women were honored: Barbara Bridges, Anne Delaney, Barbara Dobkin, Julie Gilbert, Mellody Hobson, Helen LaKelly Hunt, Swanee Hunt, Deborah Slaner Larkin, Linda Riefler, and J. Christine Wilson.

=== 2009 Honorees ===
On March 30, 2009, the EPIC awards were held at the U.N. Headquarters in New York City. The awards were hosted by Soledad O’Brien, CNN anchor and special correspondent. Awards were presented to: Chief Judge Judith S. Kaye, Maria Teresa Petersen, Rosario Dawson, and The Lifetime Network's Every Woman Counts campaign.

=== 2010 Honorees ===
On April 7, 2010, The White House Project hosted the annual EPIC Awards at the IAC Building in New York City. The goal of the evening was to celebrate and honor women's leadership in both media and popular culture. Awards were presented to the film Yes, Madam. Sir, Sheryl WuDunn, and Ally Woodard.

=== 2011 Honorees ===
On April 7, 2011, The White House Project hosted the 9th annual EPIC Awards. The event honored seven people who were advocates of women's leadership in popular culture and media: Marie C. Wilson, Gabi Wilson, Duane Baughman, Doug Liman, John Schreiber, Ben Hauser, and Dee Rees.
