= Externship =

Period of work experience, usually for students

Externships are experiential learning opportunities, similar to internships, provided by partnerships between educational institutions and employers to give students practical experiences in their field of study. In medicine, it may refer to a visiting physician who is not part of the regular staff. In law, it usually refers to rigorous legal work opportunities undertaken by law students for law school credit, similar to that of a junior attorney. It is derived from Latin externus and from English -ship.

The term externship has a first known use date of 1905 in the Merriam-Webster dictionary.

== Advantages ==
Externships are often viewed as job shadowing since externs are closely supervised by employee volunteers who agree to walk them through day-to-day routines at the company or organization. They can be viewed as external studies which combine classroom knowledge with real-world experience. This knowledge prepares students for the transition from school to career.

The experience obtained through externships allows students to apply their coursework learning to real-life settings, and to observe and ask questions within that context. Externships may lead to opportunities after students complete their studies. They can help pre-graduates get their foot in the door for possible job openings or even make them better candidates for aggressive internship opportunities, and to allow externs to become familiar with new professions and job fields. Externships are also a source of networking contacts once a profession is chosen.

Externships are not only conducted for the benefit of the extern, but for the host as well. Both parties get a chance to observe one another. Successful externships could lead to recruitment possibilities which would be based on a thoroughly informed decision.

== Legal externships ==
Legal externships, like internships, can be taken for law school credit. Internships and externships offered by law schools accredited by the Council of the ABA Section on Legal Education and Admission to the Bar are called "law clinic" and "field placement" courses, respectively, by (Accreditation) Standard 304. Experiential Courses: Simulation Courses, Law Clinics, and Field Placements. Standards 304(b) and (c) address the Council's expectations for simulation courses in clinics/internships and placements/externships, respectively.

Standard 304(d) applies to field placements (externships), defining them as follows for purposes of law school accreditation: "A field placement course provides substantial lawyering experience that (1) is reasonably similar to the experience of a lawyer advising or representing a client or engaging in other lawyering tasks in a setting outside a law clinic under the supervision of a licensed attorney or an individual otherwise qualified to supervise..."

Law schools accredited by state government agencies, such as the State Bar of California, in addition to or in place of the ABA Council, must comply with the accreditation standards of those agencies, in order to maintain those accreditations. In California's case, Rule 4.102 in Division 2. Accredited Law School Rules of Title 4. Admissions and Educational Standards provides: "A law school provisionally or fully approved by the American Bar Association is deemed accredited by the Committee [of Bar Examiners, of the State Bar of California] and exempt from these rules, unless the American Bar Association withdraws its approval." (Inset added.) Other states that accredit law schools within their boundaries include Alabama, Connecticut, Massachusetts, and Tennessee.

No university or free-standing law school allows students to receive academic credit in simulation, clinic (internship) or field placement (externship) courses for making coffee, taking inventory, or other tasks unrelated to practical experience to develop lawyering skills. Students can make the coffee if they wish - but the time they spend doing it cannot be counted as part of their experiental course time commitment. Neither can they receive academic credit for performing a paid job.

== See also ==
- Varatuomari
