= 2017 Democratic National Committee chairmanship election =

- February 25, 2017

435 members of the DNC who voted 218 votes needed to win
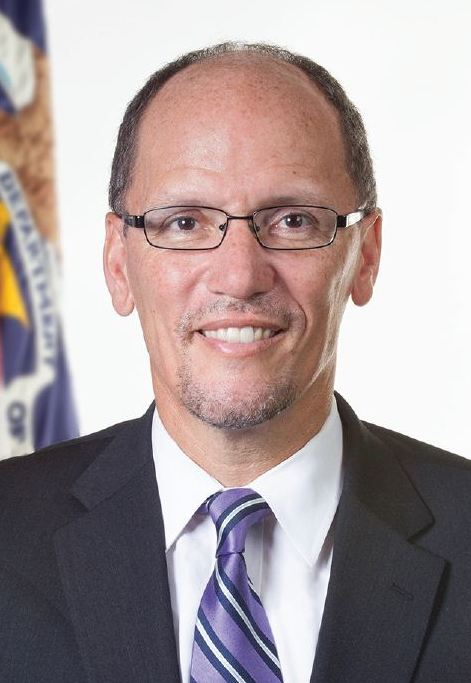

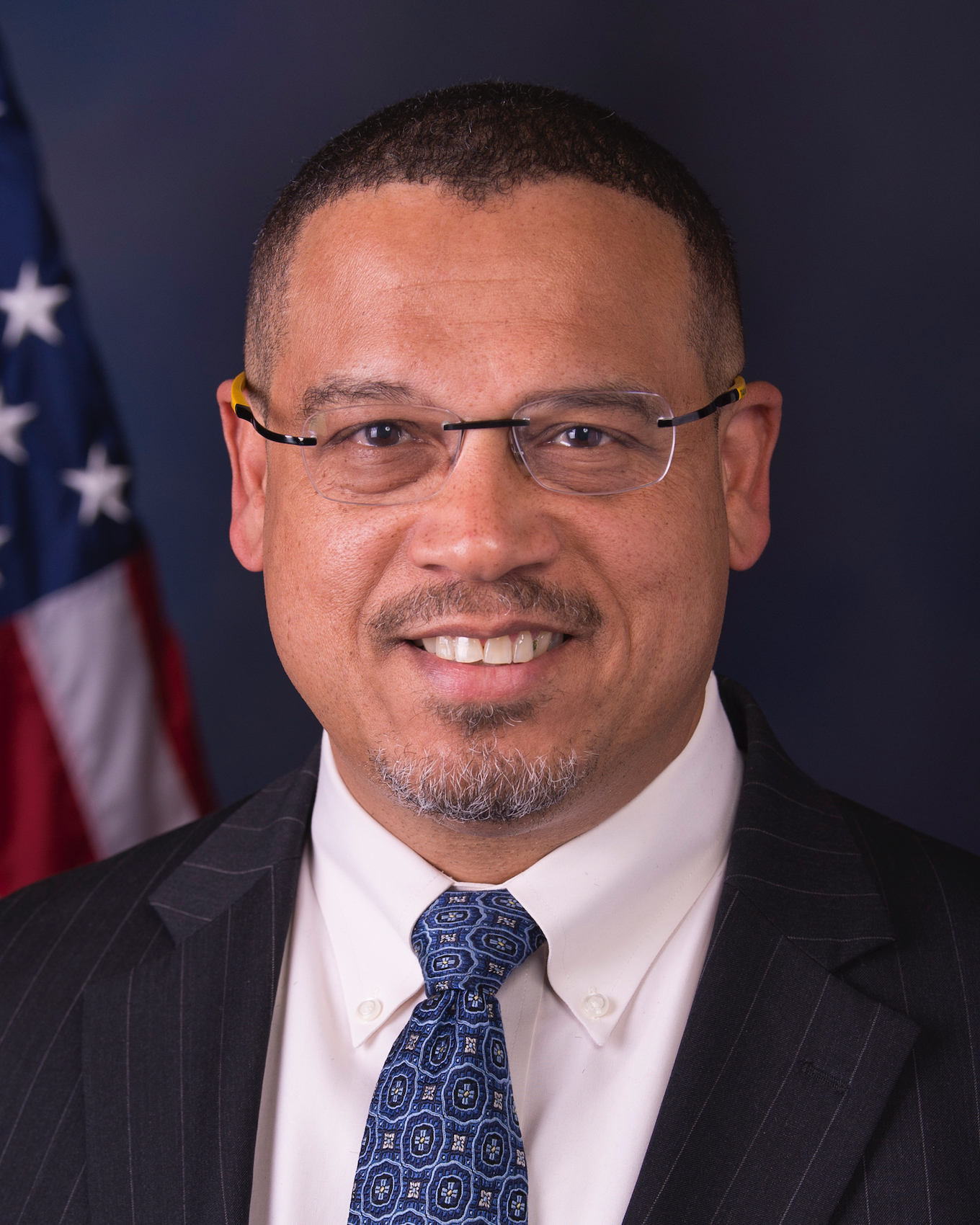
Candidate	Tom Perez	Keith Ellison
Caucus vote	235	200
Percentage	54.02%	45.98%
Chair before election
Donna Brazile (interim)
Elected Chair
Tom Perez

The 2017 Democratic National Committee chairmanship election was held on February 25, 2017, at the Westin Peachtree Plaza Hotel in Atlanta to determine the next chairperson of the Democratic National Committee (DNC). It was the first contested DNC chair election since 1985.

Tom Perez and Keith Ellison emerged as the favored candidates of the majority of DNC members. Other candidates included Sally Boynton Brown, Pete Buttigieg, future DNC chairman Jaime Harrison, Sam Ronan, and Jehmu Greene. Perez was elected chairperson after two rounds of voting.

== Background ==
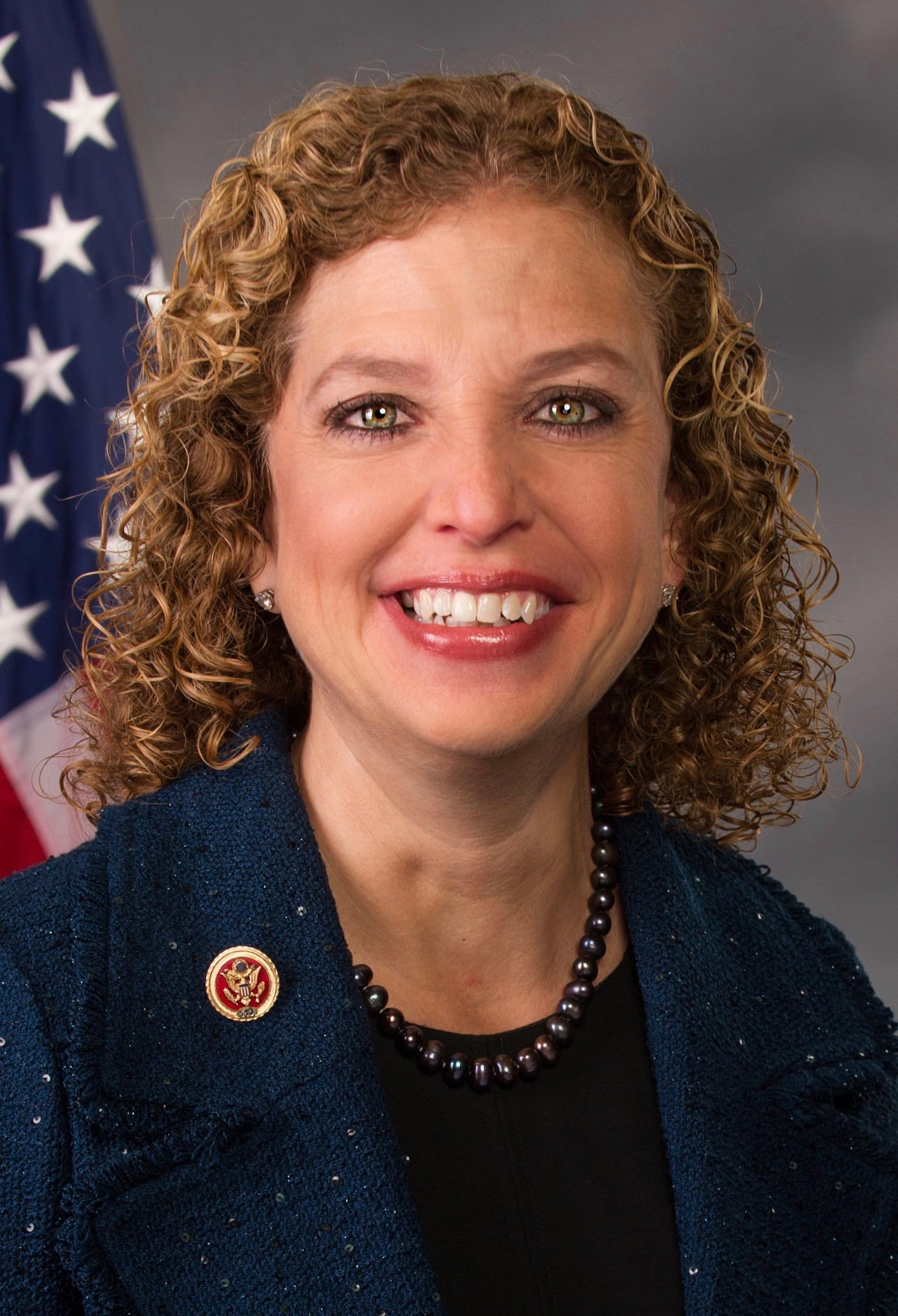
Debbie Wasserman Schultz

Following the 2016 DNC email leak, which suggested that the DNC leadership showed favor to Hillary Clinton in the 2016 presidential primary, Debbie Wasserman Schultz resigned as DNC Chairwoman, and was succeeded on an interim basis by Donna Brazile.

Brazile announced that she would not run for a full term. With no president to select a chair, this became the first contested DNC chair election since 1985. A DNC executive committee meeting took place in December to provide further procedural clarity into the race, though the election itself was to be held at the DNC's Winter Meeting in late February 2017. The 448 DNC members were the sole voting members. A quarter of the members were state level chairs and vice chairs; the remainder had been elected at the state level. To be elected as chair, a simple majority of votes was required.

== Timeline ==
- July 28, 2016 – Debbie Wasserman Schultz resigns as chairman of the Democratic National Committee; Donna Brazile appointed as interim chairman.
- Mid–December – Meeting of the executive board of the Democratic National Committee.
- February 23–26, 2017 – Election to be held by party voting members at the DNC's Winter Meeting (election must be held on or before March 31, 2017)
  - 2:28 p.m. ET, February 25, 2017 – First round of voting is concluded: Tom Perez received 213.5 votes, Keith Ellison got 200. (214.5 votes required to win the first round.)
  - 3:20 p.m. ET, February 25, 2017 – Tom Perez is elected the chair of the DNC after the second round of voting. Perez motioned for Keith Ellison to be elected as Deputy Chairman of the DNC, which was approved by unanimous voice vote.

== Candidates ==
Calling for a return to the fifty-state strategy, Howard Dean, a former Governor of Vermont who served as chairman of the DNC from 2005 to 2009, announced his candidacy on November 10. Citing the potential for a divisive race, Dean withdrew himself from consideration on December 2.

Keith Ellison, U.S. Representative for Minnesota's 5th congressional district, announced his candidacy on November 14. That day, South Carolina Democratic Party chairman Jaime Harrison also declared himself a candidate. New Hampshire Democratic Party chairman Raymond Buckley declared his candidacy on November 29. On December 16, 2016, Sally Boynton Brown, executive director of the Idaho Democratic Party, announced her candidacy.

After meeting with DNC members, Ellison announced on December 7 that he would resign his seat in the House of Representatives if elected DNC chair, so that he could focus his full attention on the job. One week later, Labor Secretary Tom Perez announced his candidacy. On February 1, former Vice President Joe Biden publicly offered his support for Perez. South Bend, Indiana Mayor Pete Buttigieg announced his candidacy on January 5, 2017. Fox News analyst Jehmu Greene announced her candidacy on January 12, 2017.

Another possible candidate was Representative Ruben Gallego of Arizona. Former California Assembly Speaker John Pérez contemplated a run, but first decided instead to run for Congress, then withdrew from that for health reasons. Former Michigan Governor Jennifer Granholm, once considered a potential candidate, took herself out of consideration. Former Maryland Governor Martin O'Malley said that he was "taking a hard look" at running for DNC chairman, but decided not to run. Ilyse Hogue, the President of NARAL Pro-Choice America, and Representative Steve Israel of New York announced that they would not run. DNC Vice-chair R. T. Rybak considered a run, then chose to endorse Ellison when the latter announced his candidacy.

Senators Bernie Sanders, Elizabeth Warren, Representative John Lewis, former Senate Minority Leader Harry Reid, and Senate Minority Leader Chuck Schumer publicly supported Representative Keith Ellison of Minnesota, the co-chairman of the Congressional Progressive Caucus. MoveOn.org, led by Ilya Sheyman, has also expressed support for Ellison, along with Progressive Democrats Of America.

=== Declared candidates ===
- Sally Boynton Brown of Idaho, executive director of the Idaho Democratic Party since 2012, withdrew on February 25, and did not endorse another candidate.
- Keith Ellison of Minnesota, U.S. Representative from Minnesota since 2007
- Jehmu Greene of Texas, Democratic strategist, Fox News analyst, and former Rock the Vote president. Withdrew on February 25, 2017, and endorsed Perez.
- Peter Peckarsky, Attorney from Wisconsin – withdrew February 25, 2017, and endorsed Ellison.
- Tom Perez of Maryland, United States Secretary of Labor from 2013 to 2017
- Samuel Ronan of Ohio, activist and Air Force veteran – withdrew February 25, 2017, and endorsed Ellison.

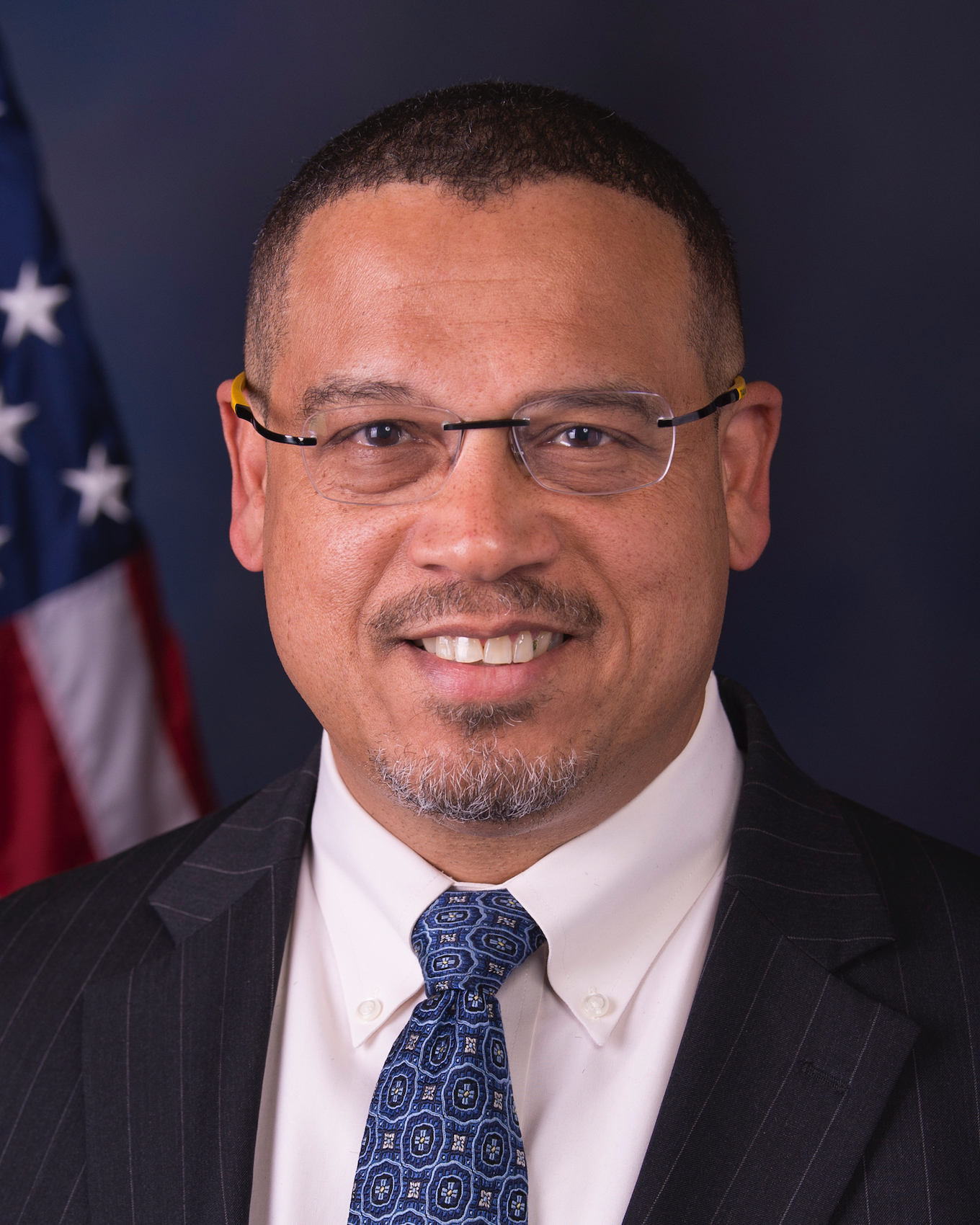
U.S. Representative
Keith Ellison
from Minnesota

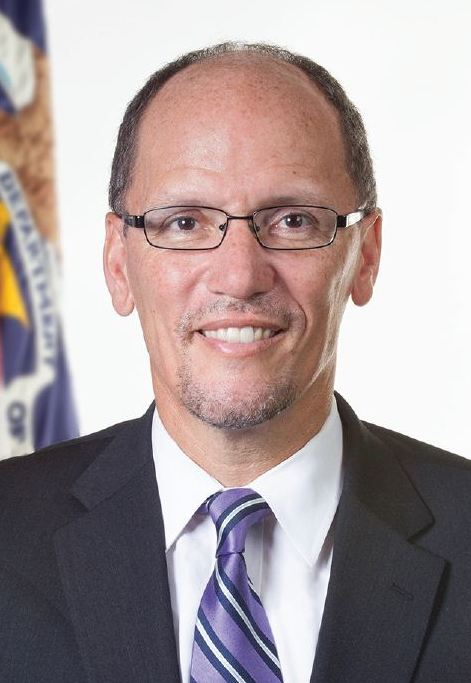
Former U.S. Secretary of Labor
Tom Perez
from Maryland

=== Withdrew prior to balloting ===
- Robert Vinson Brannum, Veterans Committee chair of the NAACP's Washington D.C. branch, withdrew on February 18, 2017, and endorsed Perez
- Raymond Buckley of New Hampshire, chairman of the New Hampshire Democratic Party since 2007, Buckley withdrew on February 18, 2017, and endorsed Ellison
- Pete Buttigieg of Indiana, Mayor of South Bend, Indiana (2012–2020). Buttigieg dropped out on the day of the election, February 25, 2017, and did not endorse another candidate.
- Howard Dean, Governor of Vermont (1991–2003); chairman of the DNC (2005–2009). Dean withdrew on December 2, 2016, and endorsed Buttigieg on February 22, 2017. After Buttigieg withdrew, Dean endorsed Ellison on February 25, 2017.
- Jaime Harrison of South Carolina, chairman of the South Carolina Democratic Party since 2013. Harrison withdrew on February 23, 2017, and endorsed Perez.

=== Declined ===
- Xavier Becerra, Attorney General of California (2017–2021); U.S. Representative from California (1993–2017)
- Joe Biden, Vice President of the United States (2009–2017); U.S. Senator from Delaware (1973–2009)
- Ruben Gallego, U.S. Representative from Arizona since 2015
- Jennifer Granholm, Governor of Michigan (2003–2011)
- Ilyse Hogue, president of NARAL Pro-Choice America
- Steve Israel, U.S. Representative from New York (2001–2017)
- Jason Kander, Secretary of State of Missouri (2013–2017); candidate for the U.S. Senate in 2016
- Martin O'Malley, Governor of Maryland (2007–2015); candidate for President in 2016
- John Pérez, Speaker of the California Assembly (2010–2014)
- R. T. Rybak, DNC Vice-chair since 2001; Mayor of Minneapolis (2002–2014)

== Forums and debates ==
The candidates participated in regional forums in Phoenix, Arizona, on January 13 and 14, in Houston, Texas, on January 27 and 28, in Detroit, Michigan, on February 3 and 4, and in Baltimore, Maryland, on February 10 and 11. They participated in two debates: the first at George Washington University, hosted by The Huffington Post, on January 18 and the second in Atlanta, sponsored and aired nationally by CNN, on February 22.

== Endorsements ==
Raymond Buckley (withdrew)

U.S. senators

- Sen. Jeanne Shaheen (D-NH)
- Sen. Maggie Hassan (D-NH)

U.S. representatives

- Rep. Annie Kuster (D-NH)
- Rep. Carol Shea-Porter (D-NH)

State and local politicians

- California State Assemblyman Evan Low
- New Hampshire State Sen. Martha Fuller Clark
- Fmr. Idaho Democratic Party Vice-Chairwoman Jeanne Buell
- Fmr. Pennsylvania Democratic Party Chairman Jim Burn
- Fmr. Democrats Abroad Vice-Chairman Robbie Checkoway
- Fmr. New Jersey Democratic Party Executive Director Sean Downey
- Fmr. New Hampshire State Sen. and Fmr. DNC Member Peter Burling
- Fmr. New Jersey Democratic Party Executive Director Paul Pennay
- Fmr. Maine Democratic Party Vice-Chairwoman Marianne Stevens
- Fmr. Wisconsin Democratic Party Chairman Mike Tate

DNC members

- DNC Western States Caucus Chair Aleita Huguenin (CA)
- Barbra Casbar Siperstein (NJ)
- Joanne Dowdell (NH)
- Kathleen Sullivan (NH)
- Penny Gerber (PA)
- William Shaheen (NH)

Individuals

- Democratic activist and Fmr. Mississippi College Republicans Chairman Evan Alvarez
- Democratic activist and Fmr. New Hampshire College Republicans Chairman Jake Wagner
- New Hampshire Young Democrats President Lucas Meyer
- Fmr. National Stonewall Democrats Executive Director Michael Colby
- New Hampshire Stonewall Democrats Chairman Ryan Richman
- LGBT human right activist and Harvey Milk Foundation Co-Founder Stuart Milk
Pete Buttigieg (withdrew)

U.S. senators

- Sen. Joe Donnelly (D-IN)
- Sen. Heidi Heitkamp (D-ND)

State and local politicians

- Fmr. Vermont Governor and former DNC Chairman Howard Dean
- Oregon State Treasurer Tobias Read
- Indiana Democratic Party Chairman John Zody
- Maryland State Sen. Bill Ferguson
- Indiana State Rep. Joe Taylor
- Mayor of West Sacramento, California Christopher Cabaldon (CA)
- Mayor of Santa Fe, New Mexico Javier Gonzales (NM)
- Mayor of Braddock, Pennsylvania John Fetterman (PA)
- Mayor of Downingtown, Pennsylvania Josh Maxwell (PA)
- Mayor of Philadelphia, Pennsylvania Jim Kenney (PA)
- Mayor of Gary, Indiana Karen Freeman-Wilson (IN)
- Mayor of New Orleans, Louisiana Mitch Landrieu (LA)
- Mayor of Dayton, Ohio Nan Whaley (OH)
- Mayor of Newton, Massachusetts Setti Warren (MA)
- Mayor of Austin, Texas Steven Adler (TX)
- Fmr. Pennsylvania Gov. and former DNC Chairman Ed Rendell
- Fmr. Gov. Martin O'Malley (D-MD)
- Fmr. Gov Ted Strickland (D-OH)
- Fmr. New York Democratic Party Chairman John T. Sullivan Jr

Organizations

- Indiana State AFL–CIO
- Kansas Young Democrats
- VoteVets.org
- Indiana High School Democrats

Individuals

- Fmr. Secretary of Commerce and Fmr. White House Chief of Staff William M. Daley
- Fmr. DNC Chairman David Wilhelm
- Fmr. DNC Chairman Joe Andrew
- Fmr. DNC Treasurer R. Scott Pastrick
- Fmr. DNC Chairman Steve Grossman
- Fmr. DNC Vice & Deputy Chair Susan Turnbull
- Fmr. DNC Deputy Chair Yolanda Caraway
- Singer & actress Cher
Keith Ellison

Vice presidents

- Walter Mondale

U.S. senators

- Senate Minority Leader Chuck Schumer (D-NY)
- Sen. Al Franken (D-MN)
- Sen. Amy Klobuchar (D-MN)
- Sen. Bernie Sanders (I-VT)
- Sen. Chris Murphy (D-CT)
- Sen. Elizabeth Warren (D-MA)
- Sen. Martin Heinrich (D-NM)
- Sen. Mazie Hirono (D-HI)
- Sen. Tammy Baldwin (D-WI)
- Sen. Tammy Duckworth (D-IL)
- Fmr. Senate Minority Leader Harry Reid (D-NV)

U.S. representatives

- Rep. Al Green (D-TX)
- Rep. Alan Lowenthal (D-CA)
- Rep. Andre Carson (D-IN)
- Rep. Barbara Lee (D-CA)
- Rep. Bobby Rush (D-IL)
- Rep. Bobby Scott (D-VA)
- Rep. Bonnie Watson Coleman (D-NJ)
- Rep. Brenda Lawrence (D-MI)
- Rep. Collin Peterson (D-MN)
- Rep. Dan Kildee (D-MI)
- Rep. Dave Loebsack (D-IA)
- Rep. Earl Blumenauer (D-OR)
- Rep. Elijah Cummings (D-MD)
- Rep. Frank Pallone (D-NJ)
- Rep. G. K. Butterfield (D-NC)
- Rep. Gwen Moore (D-WI)
- Rep. Hakeem Jeffries (D-NY)
- Rep. Jan Schakowsky (D-IL)
- Rep. Jared Huffman (D-CA)
- Rep. Joe Crowley
- Rep. John Conyers (D-MI)
- Rep. John Lewis (D-GA)
- Rep. Judy Chu (D-CA)
- Rep. Katherine Clark (D-MA)
- Rep. Lacy Clay (D-MO)
- Rep. Lloyd Doggett (D-TX)
- Rep. Luis Gutierrez (D-IL)
- Rep. Marcy Kaptur (D-OH)
- Rep. Mark Pocan (D-WI)
- Rep. Mark Takano (D-CA)
- Rep. Maxine Waters (D-CA)
- Rep. Pramila Jayapal (D-WA)
- Rep. Raja Krishnamoorthi (D-IL)
- Rep. Raúl Grijalva (D-AZ)
- Rep. Rick Nolan (D-MN)
- Rep. Ro Khanna (D-CA)
- Rep. Sheila Jackson Lee (D-TX)
- Rep. Ted Lieu (D-CA)
- Rep. Tulsi Gabbard (D-HI)
- Rep. Yvette Clarke (D-NY)
- U.S. Delegate Gregorio Sablan (D-MP)
- U.S. Delegate Madeleine Bordallo (D-GU)
- Fmr. Rep. Brad Miller (D-NC)
- Fmr. Rep. Bruce Morrison (D-CT)
- Fmr. Rep. Janice Hahn (D-CA)
- Fmr. Rep. Lynn Woolsey (D-CA)
- Fmr. Rep. Mary Rose Oakar (D-OH)
- Fmr. Rep. Mike Honda (D-CA)

State and local politicians

- Gov. Mark Dayton (D-MN)
- Lieutenant Gov. Gavin Newsom (D-CA)
- Lieutenant Gov. Tina Smith (D-MN)
- New York Attorney General Eric Schneiderman
- California State Controller Betty Yee
- California State Assembly Speaker John Pérez
- Arizona Democratic Party Chairwoman Alexis Tameron
- California Democratic Party Chairman John L. Burton
- California Democratic Party Vice-Chairman Eric C. Bauman
- California Democratic Party Sec. Daraka Larimore-Hall
- Hawaii Democratic Party Chairman Tim Vandeveer
- Illinois Democratic Party Vice-Chairwoman Karen Yarbrough
- Indiana Democratic Party Vice-Chairwoman Cordelia Lewis Burks
- Maine Democratic Party Chairman Phil Bartlett
- Maryland Democratic Party Vice-Chairwoman and Mayor of Cambridge, MD Victoria Jackson-Stanley
- Michigan Democratic Party Chairman Brandon Dillon
- Minnesota DFL Party Chairman Ken Martin
- Minnesota DFL Party Vice-Chairwoman Marge Hoffa
- Missouri Democratic Party Vice-Chairwoman Genevieve Williams
- Montana Democratic Party Chairman Jim Larson
- Mississippi Democratic Party Vice-Chairman Rae Shawn Davis
- Nebraska Democratic Party Chairwoman Jane Kleeb
- Nebraska Democratic Party Vice-Chairman Frank LaMere
- New Hampshire Democratic Party Chairman, President of the Association of State Democratic Chairs, and Ex-DNC Chair Candidate Raymond Buckley
- New York Democratic Party Vice-Chairwoman and Fmr. New York City Council Speaker Christine Quinn
- New Mexico Democratic Party Vice-Chairman Juan Sanchez
- Oklahoma Democratic Party Chairman Mark Hammons
- Rhode Island Democratic Party Chairman Joseph M. McNamara
- South Dakota Democratic Party Chairwoman Ann Tornberg
- South Dakota Democratic Party Vice-Chairman Joe Lowe
- Washington Democratic Party Chairwoman Tina Podlodowski
- Washington Democratic Party Vice-Chairman Joe Pakootas
- Wisconsin Democratic Party Chairwoman Martha Laning
- Wisconsin Democratic Party Vice-Chairman and Wisconsin State Rep. David Bowen
- Vermont Democratic Party Chairwoman Dottie Deans
- Vermont Democratic Party Vice-Chairman Tim Jerman
- Arizona State Sen. Martín Quezada
- California State Sen. Toni Atkins
- Georgia State Sen. Nan Grogan Orrock
- Illinois State Sen. Daniel Biss
- Illinois State Sen. Omar Aquino
- Maine State Sen. Troy Jackson
- Massachusetts State Sen. James Eldridge
- Michigan State Sen. Ian Conyers
- Minnesota State Sen. Bobby Joe Champion
- Minnesota State Sen. Jeff Hayden
- Minnesota State Sen. Melisa Franzen
- Minnesota State Sen. Patricia Torres Ray
- Minnesota State Sen. Scott Dibble
- Minnesota State Sen. Susan Allen
- New York State Sen. Gustavo Rivera
- Rhode Island State Sen. Adam Satchell
- Rhode Island State Sen. Hanna Gallo
- Rhode Island State Sen. Joshua Miller
- Rhode Island State Sen. Jeanine Calkin
- Rhode Island State Sen. James Sheehan
- Washington State Sen. Bob Hasegawa
- Washington State Sen. Maralyn Chase
- Virginia State Sen. Adam Ebbin
- Wisconsin State Sen. Chris Larson
- Wisconsin State Sen. Kathleen Vinehout
- Wisconsin State Sen. Mark F. Miller
- Wisconsin State Sen. Robert Wirch
- Wisconsin State Sen. Tim Carpenter
- Minnesota State Rep. Erin Maye Quade
- Minnesota State Rep. Peggy Flanagan
- New Jersey State Asm. John Wisniewski
- Rhode Island House of Reps. Majority Leader, State Rep. K. Joseph Shekarchi
- Mecklenburg County Commissioner Pat Cotham (NC)
- Mayor of New York City Bill de Blasio (NY)
- Mayor of Madison, Wisconsin Paul Soglin (WI)
- Mayor of Kansas City and Democratic Municipal Officials Chairman Sly James (MO)
- Mayor of Ithaca, New York Svante Myrick (NY)
- Standing Rock Indian Reservation Chairman David Archambault II (ND)
- Deputy Mayor of New Rochelle, New York Jared Rice (NY)
- Baltimore City Council President Bernard C. Young (MD)
- New York City Council Speaker Melissa Mark-Viverito (NY)
- Fmr. Oklahoma State Sen. Constance N. Johnson
- Fmr. Ohio State Sen. Nina Turner

DNC members

- DNC Vice-Chairman R.T. Rybak
- DNC Vice-Chairwoman Maria Elena Durazo
- AJ Durrani (TX)
- Annette Taddeo-Goldstein (FL)
- Elly Zaragoza (MN)
- Fmr. U.S. Secretary of Labor Hilda Solis (CA)
- President of the American Federation of Government Employees J. David Cox Sr. (at-large)
- Jeri Shepherd (CO)
- Jessica Chambers (WY)
- Jim Zogby (DC)
- President of American Federation of State, County and Municipal Employees Lee Saunders (OH)
- President of the National Education Association (NEA) Lily Eskelsen García (at-large)
- Lupita Maurer (OR)
- Matt Keating (OR)
- Tanya Shively (OR)
- Travis Nelson (OR)
- Persephone Dakopolos (MO)
- President of American Federation of Teachers Randi Weingarten (at-large)
- Rich Cassidy (VT)
- Ron Harris (MN)
- Troy Jackson (ME)
- Yasmine Taeb (VA)

Labor unions

- 1199SEIU United Healthcare Workers East
- AFL–CIO
- Alliance for Retired Americans
- American Federation of Government Employees
- Asian Pacific American Labor Alliance (APALA)
- Communications Workers of America
- Good Jobs Nation
- International Brotherhood of Electrical Workers
- International Brotherhood of Teamsters
- National Nurses United
- Service Employees International Union, Local 32B
- UNITE HERE
- United Automobile Workers
- United Steelworkers

Organizations

- 350.org
- Americans for Democratic Action
- ASPIRE PAC
- Bend The Arc Jewish Action
- California Democratic Party African American Caucus
- Center for Popular Democracy Action
- Champaign County Democratic Party (IL)
- DC For Democracy
- Democracy for America
- Democratic Socialists of America
- Friends of the Earth Action
- Gulf Coast State College Democrats
- Illinois Democratic County Chairmen’s Association
- Michigan State University College Democrats
- MoveOn Political Action
- National Democratic Seniors Coordinating Council
- North Kingstown Democratic Town Committee
- Our Revolution
- People's Action Network
- Progressive Change Campaign Committee
- Progressive Democrats of America
- Rutgers Progressives
- Social Security Works
- Texas Coalition of Black Democrats
- The Nation Magazine
- University of Texas at Dallas College Democrats
- Working Families Party
- Young Democrats of Rhode Island

Individuals

- Executive Director of Social Security Works Alex Lawson
- Philanthropist Alexander Soros
- Fmr. NAACP Chairman and Civil Rights Activist Ben Jealous
- President of Communications Workers of America Chris Shelton
- Co-Founder of United Farm Workers Dolores Huerta
- Activist Gloria Steinem
- Civil rights activist Jesse Jackson
- Chair of Democracy For America Jim Dean
- Immigration Rights activist, and Founder and CEO of Define American Jose Antonio Vargas
- International President of the Amalgamated Transit Union (ATU) Lawrence J. Hanley
- President of the United Steelworkers (USW) Leo Gerard
- Executive Vice President, Emerita, of the AFL–CIO and Fmr. DNC Vice-Chairwoman Linda Chavez-Thompson
- President of the International Brotherhood of Electrical Workers (IBEW) Lonnie Stephenson
- President of the American Postal Workers Union (APWU) Mark Dimondstein
- Filmmaker Michael Moore
- Executive Director of National Nurses United RoseAnn DeMoro
- Co-Founder and Co-Director of ROC United and ROC Action Saru Jayaraman
- President of the Coalition of Black Trade Unionists and Secretary-Treasurer of the New York State AFL–CIO Rev. Terry L. Melvin
- Political activist Zephyr Teachout
Jaime Harrison (withdrew)

U.S. representatives

- Rep. Bennie Thompson (D-MS)
- Rep. Jim Clyburn (D-SC)
- Fmr. Rep. John Barrow (D-GA)
- Rep. John B. Larson (D-CT)
- Fmr. Rep. John Spratt (D-SC)
- Rep. Marcia Fudge (D-OH)
- Rep. Sanford Bishop (D-GA)
- Fmr. U.S. Delegate Donna Christian-Christensen (VI)

DNC members

- Fmr. DNC Chairman Carol Fowler (SC)
- Clay Middleton (SC)

State and Local Politicians

- South Carolina Democratic Party First Vice-Chair Kaye Lingle Koonce (SC)
- Fmr. Gov. and Fmr. U.S. Secretary of Education Richard Riley (D-SC)
Tom Perez

Presidents

- Barack Obama

Vice presidents

- Joe Biden

U.S. representatives

- Rep. Steny Hoyer (D-MD)
- Rep. Filemon Vela Jr. (D-TX)
- Fmr. Rep. Tony Coelho (D-CA) Primary Sponsor of the Americans with Disabilities Act

State and local politicians

- Gov. Dannel Malloy (D-CT), also President of the Democratic Governors Association
- Gov. Gina Raimondo (D-RI)
- Gov. Jay Inslee (D-WA)
- Gov. John Bel Edwards (D-LA)
- Gov. John Hickenlooper (D-CO)
- Gov. Terry McAuliffe (D-VA), also former DNC Chair
- Gov. Tom Wolf (D-PA)
- Illinois Attorney General Lisa Madigan
- Georgia Democratic Party Chairman DuBose Porter
- Georgia Democratic Party Vice-Chairwoman Nikema Williams
- Illinois Democratic Party Chairman Mike Madigan
- Kansas Democratic Party Chairwoman Lee Kinch
- Kansas Democratic Party Vice-Chairwoman Kathryn Focke
- Maryland Democratic Party Chairman Bruce Poole
- New Jersey Democratic State Committee Chairman John Currie
- Ohio Democratic Party Chairman David Pepper
- Pennsylvania Democratic Party Chairman Marcel Groen
- Texas Democratic Party Chairman Gilberto Hinojosa
- Texas State Sen. José R. Rodríguez
- Wisconsin State Sen. Janet Bewley
- Harris County Commissioner Rodney Ellis (TX)
- Mayor of Seattle Ed Murray (WA)
- Mayor of Los Angeles Eric Garcetti (CA)
- Mayor of Phoenix Greg Stanton (AZ)
- Mayor of Atlanta Kasim Reed (GA)
- Fmr. Mayor of Houston Annise Parker (TX)
- Fmr. Mayor of Trenton, New Jersey, and fmr. President of the U.S. Conference of Mayors Douglas Palmer
- Fmr. Mayor of Philadelphia and fmr. President of the U.S. Conference of Mayors Michael Nutter
- Fmr. Atlanta Mayor and Co-Chair of 2016 Democratic National Committee Platform Committee Shirley Clarke Franklin

DNC members

- Founder of Texas Latinas List Celina Vasquez (TX)
- Isabel Framer (OH)
- William T. Cheek (TN)

Organizations

- Congressional Hispanic Caucus BOLDPAC
- International Brotherhood of Boilermakers, Iron Ship Builders, Blacksmiths, Forgers and Helpers
- International Association of Fire Fighters
- International Longshore and Warehouse Union (ILWU)
- International Union of Bricklayers and Allied Craftworkers (BAC)
- United Association of Journeymen and Apprentices of the Plumbing and Pipefitting Industry (UA)
- United Brotherhood of Carpenters and Joiners of America (UBC)
- United Farm Workers
- United Food and Commercial Workers
- Democratic Hispanic Caucus of Florida
- Fmr. U.S. Attorney General Eric Holder
- Fmr. Secretary of Health and Human Services and Fmr. Gov. of Kansas Kathleen Sebelius (D-KS)
- Fmr. U.S. Secretary of Agriculture and Fmr. Gov. of Iowa Tom Vilsack (D-IA)
- Fmr. Director of the Office of Public Engagement and Intergovernmental Affairs and Fmr. Senior Advisor to the President Valerie Jarrett
- 53 former U.S. Attorneys and Department of Justice officials

== Results ==
With 447 voting members of the DNC, 224 votes were expected to be needed to win the chairmanship. However, only 427 members voted in the first round (Chairperson Donna Brazile and two other members present did not vote, and one abstained), so only 214.5 votes were required to reach the threshold for victory. In the first round, Perez received 213.5 votes, while Ellison received 200, Boynton Brown received 12, Buttigieg received one, and Greene received 0.5. (Note: While DNC members received a full vote, Democrats Abroad had half of a vote.)

After the first round, Greene dropped out and endorsed Perez, while Peckarsky and Ronan dropped out and endorsed Ellison. Boynton Brown withdrew without endorsing a candidate. In the second round, 435 votes were cast: 235 for Tom Perez and 200 for Keith Ellison. After Perez won, he selected Ellison as deputy chair.

The vote tally was obtained through an email from the DNC.

Candidate	Round 1	Round 2
Pete Buttigieg	1	Withdrew
Sally Boynton Brown	12	Withdrew
Keith Ellison	200	200
Jehmu Greene	0.5	Withdrew
Peter Peckarsky	0	Withdrew
Tom Perez	213.5	235
Sam Ronan	0	Withdrew
No vote	2	0
Abstain	1	0

Candidate secured enough votes to win election
Candidate secured a plurality of votes in the round
Candidate withdrew

== See also ==
- 2005 Democratic National Committee chairmanship election
- 2017 Republican National Committee chairmanship election
