= Jehmu Greene =

American political commentator

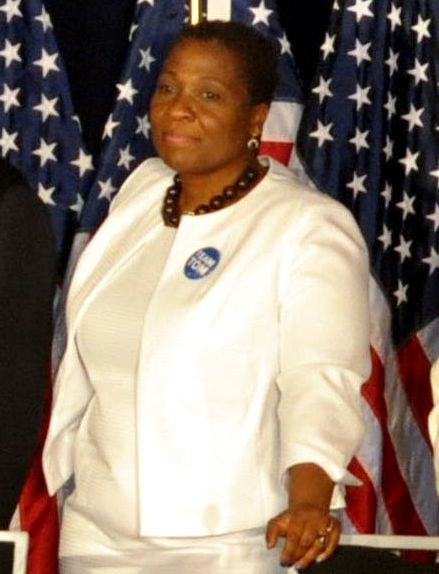
- Greene in 2017

Personal details
- Born: Washington, D.C., U.S.
- Party: Democratic

Jehmu Greene is an American television commentator, social justice advocate, and political and media strategist. She was born in Washington, D.C., and grew up in Austin, Texas. The daughter of Liberian immigrants, Greene is a first generation American.

Greene was a candidate for Chair of the Democratic National Committee (DNC), the election was held on February 25, 2017, in Atlanta. She withdrew on February 25, 2017, and endorsed Tom Perez.

== Career ==
On January 13, 2017, Greene joined the race for chair of the Democratic National Committee.

From 1998-2000, Greene served as the Director of Women's Outreach and Southern Political Director at the Democratic National Committee (DNC). Greene also served as the program director for the Center for Policy Alternatives' Youth Voices Project and National Student Voter Education Day, Volunteer Coordinator for the University of Texas at Austin Neighborhood Longhorns Program, and Executive Director of the Texas Young Democrats. In addition, she has worked on numerous campaigns, including Clinton/Gore '96, Harvey Gantt for U.S. Senate, Lloyd Doggett for Congress, Jim Mattox for U.S. Senate, and Ann Richards for Governor.

In 1999, Greene traveled to Botswana and South Africa on behalf of the United States Information Agency to encourage young voters to participate in the upcoming elections.

Greene served on the Credentials Committee for the 2004 Democratic National Convention in Boston, Massachusetts. After the 2004 elections, Greene was appointed by Terry McAuliffe, DNC Chairman, to serve on the Commission on Presidential Timing and Scheduling. The Commission concluded its work in December 2005 and submitted its report to DNC Chairman, Howard Dean. To address diversity, representation, and participation issues in a meaningful way, the Commission recommended that there be an additional one or two first-tier caucuses inserted between the Iowa caucus and the New Hampshire primary.

Throughout her career, she has worked with the media to build high-profile social justice campaigns. A commentator on Fox News, CNN, MSNBC and elsewhere, Greene served as president of Rock the Vote from 2000-2005 where membership grew from 1,500 to 1 million, 1.4 million new voters were registered, over 200 celebrities volunteered their support and youth voter turnout increased 11%, the highest increase ever recorded in between two presidential elections.

Greene is a former National Director of Project Vote, the 501c3 voter registration arm of Association of Community Organizations for Reform Now (ACORN).

From 2009-2010, Greene was president of Women's Media Center, a 501(c)(3) nonprofit media advocacy organization founded in 2005 by Jane Fonda, Robin Morgan, and Gloria Steinem.

In 2010, Greene was appointed by Secretary of State Hillary Clinton to serve on the U.S. National Commission for UNESCO.

Greene co-founded Define American in June 2011 with Jose Antonio Vargas, Jake Brewer, and Alicia Menendez. Define American seeks to elevate the conversation on immigration reform.

In 2013, she joined forces with the Founders of WakaWaka, Camille van Gestel and Maurits Groen to bring attention to their award-winning Wakawaka light and raise awareness about energy poverty. In 2014, she became president of WakaWaka North America and after Groen and van Gestel stepped down as co-CEOs, she was appointed Interim CEO of WakaWaka in 2015.

She was a member of the Citizen's Debate Commission and previously served on the board of directors of the American Prospect Magazine; Demos; Youth Vote Coalition; The Entrepreneurial Development Institute (TEDI). She has also served as an advisory board member of the Partnership for Public Service; Campus Green Vote; Vote for America; The White House Project's Vote-Run-Lead Project; and Freedom's Answer. Greene was a co-founder and board member of the 2030 Center, an economic and public policy organization for young adults.

Greene was a founder and managing partner of Urban Hang Suite, a party promotion and early social networking company that specialized in connecting African American professionals in Washington, D.C.

== In the news ==
Greene is a paid Fox News Channel contributor with frequent appearances on Fox News and Fox Business. She has appeared on numerous television and radio programs, including The O'Reilly Factor, MTV News, The Daily Show, Anderson Cooper 360, Dennis Miller Live, CBS Evening News, NBC Nightly News, Bloomberg Television, NPR's News & Notes, Democracy Now!, Tucker Carlson Tonight, and The Tavis Smiley Show.

On the edition of May 4, 2012 of America Live, Greene referred to fellow debater Tucker Carlson as a "bow-tying white boy", in a discussion about Massachusetts Senate candidate Elizabeth Warren's decision to list herself as a member of a racial minority in the Association of American Law Schools desk book, a directory of law professors, in the 1980s and 1990s, because her great-great-great-grandmother was listed as Cherokee. Host Megyn Kelly later apologized to Carlson and her audience for the remark on behalf of the program, calling it "an inappropriate name" that was "not consistent with our standards".

Greene has received the National Conference for Community and Justice's Community Service Award, the American Association of University Women's Women of Distinction Award, and the National Council for Research on Women's Women Making a Difference Award. Essence magazine has named Greene among its "40 Women Under 40 Shaping the World" and "35 Most Beautiful and Remarkable Women in the World".
