= 2005 Democratic National Committee chairmanship election =

DNC chairmanship election, 2005
- February 12, 2005
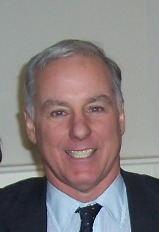
Candidate	Howard Dean
Chair before election
Terry McAuliffe
Elected Chair
Howard Dean

The 2005 Democratic National Committee (DNC) chairmanship election was held on February 12, 2005, to elect a chairperson to the DNC for a four-year term. Howard Dean was elected as the DNC chair, succeeding Terry McAuliffe.

== Race ==
Following the 2004 U.S. presidential election, some Democratic Party insiders wanted Terry McAuliffe to remain DNC chair. The netroots pushed for a different leader who would move the party away from the large donors. Howard Dean, a candidate for the Democratic Party nomination for president in 2004, announced his bid to become DNC chair on January 11. Other candidates to declare included Former U.S. Representative Tim Roemer of Indiana, former Al Gore and John Kerry staffer Donnie Fowler, Mayor of Denver Wellington Webb, New Democrat Network founder Simon Rosenberg, Former U.S. Representative Martin Frost of Texas, and Ohio Democratic Party Chair David J. Leland. Kate Michelman almost ran due to Roemer's anti-abortion stance, but she opted not to run. Harold M. Ickes also considered running, but did not.

Dean became the front-runner in the race, though Roemer received the endorsements of Harry Reid and Nancy Pelosi, the Democratic Party leaders in the United States Senate and United States House of Representatives, respectively. Though the executive committee of the Association of State Democratic Party chairs recommended an endorsement of Fowler, the group chose to endorse Dean on January 31. Webb dropped out and endorsed Dean. On February 1, Dean announced the endorsements of 53 more members of the DNC, increasing his total number of DNC supporters to 102. The AFL–CIO opted not to endorse a candidate. Meanwhile, the Service Employees International Union endorsed Dean. Without the support of the labor movement, Frost dropped out. Receiving little support, Leland dropped out as well.

Rosenberg dropped out on February 4 and endorsed Dean. Fowler dropped out on February 5 and endorsed Dean. Roemer, Dean's last challenger, dropped out on February 7. Dean was elected by a voice vote on February 12.

== See also ==
- Democratic National Committee chairmanship election, 2017
