= Take Our Kids to Work Day =

Canadian education event

- Date: First Wednesday of November
- Location: Canada
- Type: Education
- Website: http://www.thelearningpartnership.ca/TOKW

Take Our Kids to Work Day is an annual career exploration event, held on the first Wednesday of November, where Grade 9, Senior 1 (Manitoba) and Secondary III (Quebec) students across Canada spend the day in the life of a working professional. Developed by The Learning Partnership and now led by The Students Commission of Canada, the initiative started as a one-day event for students in the Greater Toronto Area in the Canadian province of Ontario. Currently, it is a national event with more than 250,000 students, 18,000 teachers and 75,000 organizations participating each year. The most recent Take Our Kids to Work Day took place on Wednesday, November 6, 2024.

Students spend the day at the workplace of a parent, relative, friend or volunteer host, witnessing first-hand the world of work, prompting early career planning, and enabling students to make informed decisions about their future goals and endeavours. The event also gives parents the opportunity to discuss career prospects with their children, and allows businesses to share knowledge, experience and advice around education, career choices and relevant skills required in today's workplace.

== Overview ==
Developed by The Learning Partnership, Take Our Kids to Work Day is the most recognized career exploration event in Canada, in which Grade 9 students experience a day in the life of various professionals, careers and industries. The Learning Partnership ceased operations in summer of 2022.

== History ==
The Learning Partnership founded Take Our Kids to Work Day in 1994. The concept of Take our Kids to Work Day was loosely related to Take Your Daughter to Work Day in the United States founded the year prior, which is now called Take Our Daughters and Sons to Work Day. Take Our Kids to Work is The Learning Partnership's flagship program. Unlike its American counterpart, Take Our Kids to Work focuses on Grade 9 students and takes place annually on the first Wednesday of November instead of April. November 5, 2014, marked the 20th anniversary of Take Our Kids to Work.

== See also ==
- Job shadow
- Take Our Daughters and Sons to Work Day
