= WakaWaka =

- Founded: 2012
- Founders: Maurits Groen & Camille van Gestel
- Headquarters: Haarlem, Netherlands
- Area served: Worldwide
- Key people: Camille van Gestel (CEO)
- Products: Solar chargers and flashlights
- Website: waka-waka.com

WakaWaka is a global social enterprise that developed and sold portable solar products for people without access to electricity. The company was founded in 2012 by Maurits Groen and Camille van Gestel. WakaWaka means “shine bright” in Swahili. For every WakaWaka purchased, one solar light was donated to a family living without access to electricity. In July 2018 TSM Business School took over the brand name and the remaining stocks of WakaWaka, after the enterprise went bankrupt after failing to raise EUR 2.5 million in growth capital.

== Company history ==
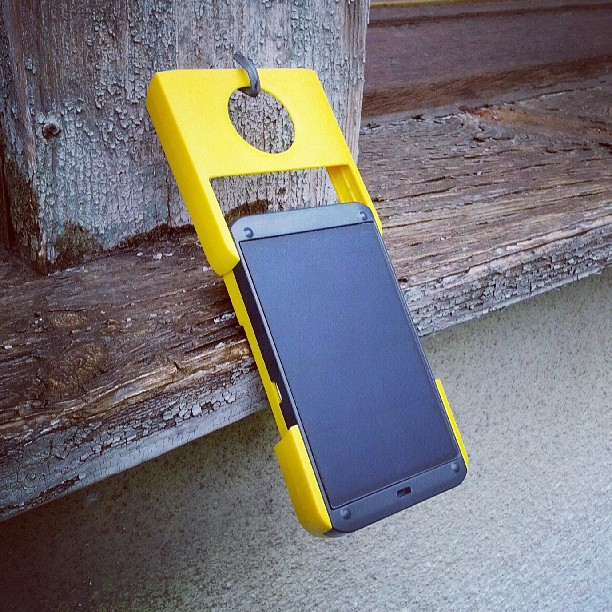
WakaWaka lamp (charging)

The company was founded in 2012 by Maurits Groen and Camille van Gestel. The inspiration for WakaWaka was first sparked in 2010, as Maurits and Camille traveled through South Africa, working to offset carbon emissions from that year’s World Cup championship. Throughout their travels, they were struck by the scores of people living without access to electricity.

Funded by a Kickstarter campaign that raised $48,000, the first product produced in 2012 was the WakaWaka Light, a solar flashlight. In 2013 and 2014, the company turned to Kickstarter again and added OnePlanetCrowd to crowdfund the product development of the WakaWaka Power, a solar charger and flashlight and the WakaWaka Base, a solar home kit, raising $700,000 and $385,000 respectively.

WakaWaka opened an office in Kigali, Rwanda in 2014 and launched the Virtual Grid, the world’s first telecom-based pico solar pay-as-you-go system. Since 2019, WakaWaka Rwanda has continued independently under the name of Mother Light Africa.

In the fall of 2015, Maurits Groen was named #1 in Trouw's Sustainability Index of the 100 most sustainable people in the Netherlands.

In 2016, WakaWaka has started selling through retail, in the UK, France, Germany, Switzerland and Scandinavia.

== Business model ==
Through the company's Share the Sun model, when customers buy a WakaWaka they also give a solar light to a family living without access to electricity. In the United States, donated solar lights are given exclusively to the International Rescue Committee. In other countries, donations are given to the Red Cross, Save the Children, Habitat for Humanity and others. The company is against flooding communities in developing markets with donated products. WakaWaka donates without reservation in humanitarian crisis and disaster relief situations. Outside of humanitarian emergencies, they develop market-based models and encourage their partners to do the same.

== Impact ==
WakaWaka is a member of the Clinton Global Initiative.

Before instituting a global buy one, give one model, the company tested different impact business models. 12,000 WakaWaka Powers were donated to Haitian organizations rebuilding after the 2010 earthquake. 15,000 WakaWakas were sent to Sierra Leone and Liberia for health workers and to be included in prevention kits for families. 20,000 WakaWakas were donated through its Solar for Philippines and Solar for Syria campaigns. 5,000 WakaWakas were delivered to earthquake victims in Nepal.

== Reception ==
- Awards

In 2016, Wakawaka received the Distree EMEA Diamond Award for Best Mobile & Tablet Accessory.

In 2015, WakaWaka received three CES Innovation Awards for the WakaWaka Power+ and the WakaWaka Base.

In 2015, the WakaWaka Power won the ANWB/KCK Kampeer Award 2015, a Dutch award for best camping accessory.

In 2014, WakaWaka’s prepaid solar product was recognized for its Good Industrial Design at the 28th GIO awards ceremony hosted by Design Link.

In 2014, WakaWaka won four Accenture Innovation Awards, including the popularity votes in three categories: Communications, Media & Technology (CMT), Energy and Sustainable Products and the jury prize for CMT. This caused a spokesperson of Accenture to mention this as a unique event in the history of the Award: “Never before we have seen a winner of both jury prize and popularity vote in the same category.”

In 2013, WakaWaka won the Social Enterprise Start-Up Award during Social Enterprise Day in the Netherlands. The jury stated "start-up WakaWaka deserved this first prize, WakaWaka is a passionate social enterprise dedicated to fight energy poverty They have the poorest people as a target group and create real impact with their high-tech, low-cost solar lamps. By utilizing the latest technology in the field of solar energy, WakaWakas are a real lifesaver for people without access to electricity."
