= Carolyn McKecuen =

- Occupation: President of the Take Our Daughters And Sons To Work Foundation
- Known for: Founder and director of Watermark craft cooperative; supporter of Take Our Daughters to the Polls initiative
- Awards: Presidential Award for Public/Private Support in Microenterprise (Ms. Foundation); 1994 MacArthur Fellows Program

Carolyn McKecuen is President of the Take Our Daughters And Sons To Work Foundation. She supported Take our Daughters to the Polls as a non-partisan initiative. She is founder and director of Watermark, a member-owned craft cooperative.

== Awards ==
- Presidential Award for Public/Private Support in Microenterprise, by the Ms. Foundation
- 1994 MacArthur Fellows Program
