= Marie C. Wilson =

American writer and feminist

- Born: Marie Collins
- Education: Vanderbilt University, University of Delaware, Drake University
- Notable work: Closing the Leadership Gap: Why Women Can and Must Help Run the World
- Spouse: Nancy A. Lee
- Children: 5

Marie C. Wilson is a feminist, author, political organizer and entrepreneur; founder and president emerita of the White House Project and the Ms. Foundation for Women; and creator of Take our Daughters to Work Day. She has written Closing the Leadership Gap: Why Women Can and Must Help Run the World and Getting Big: Reimagining the Women's Movement. She contributed the piece "Front Line: The Funding Struggle" to the 2003 anthology Sisterhood Is Forever: The Women's Anthology for a New Millennium, edited by Robin Morgan.

== Early life and education ==
Wilson was born and raised in Georgia, the daughter of a typesetter and a dental hygienist. She was the Vice President of the Student Body, a Merit Scholar, and Homecoming Queen. Wilson studied philosophy at Vanderbilt University,[6] where she and now-Senator Lamar Alexander supported black activist James Lawson during his sit-ins at Nashville's lunch counters to protest racism.[7] She graduated from the University of Delaware and received a Master of Science in higher education from Drake University.[8]

== Early career ==
Between 1978 and 1981, Wilson was the Director of Women's Programs at Drake University; creating one of the largest programs of its kind in America. During this time, Wilson designed and administered educational programs and services for women who are entering or re-entering the workforce. During a five-year term as the Director of Women's Programs, Wilson created special career and professional development and re-training programs that met the needs of 3,000 women annually. Wilson also initiated career programs for women in the community, including men and women managing together, alternative work arrangements, and career development for minority women. After having built the largest university-based women's program in the county, Wilson worked at the Iowa Bankers Association, serving as its vice president, and Director of Education and Human Resources.

== Des Moines City Council ==
In 1983, Wilson became the first woman elected to the Des Moines City Council as a member-at-large. In 1984, during her tenure as a city councilwoman, Wilson was recruited to the Ms. Foundation for Women.

== Ms. Foundation ==
Wilson left a seat on the Des Moines City Council to lead the Ms. Foundation. Created in 1973, the Ms. Foundation was established at the height of the feminist movement to fund feminist organizations nationwide. Wilson and her staff initiated funding circles, including some of the first collaborative groups in the funding community, beginning with the creation of the Collaborative Fund for Women's Economic Development, for which the foundation received an award from the White House. Since its inception, it has leveraged tens of millions of dollars to support local micro-enterprise programs for low-income women and to reshape public policy. of During her time at the foundation, main initiatives included establishing a $17 million endowment in an organization that had none, and, beginning a 5-year, $50 million endowment campaign.

In honor of her work, the Ms. Foundation created The Marie C. Wilson Leadership Fund.

== Take Our Daughters To Work Day ==
In 1992, during her tenure as President of the Ms. Foundation, Wilson created Take Our Daughters To Work Day, which later became Take Our Daughters and Sons To Work Day. It has since been celebrated every year on the 4th Thursday in April by over 30 million children, parents, and schools, and has been adopted by over four million workplaces across the country. It has been one of the most successful public education campaigns in the nation, and participants in over 200 countries around the world plan for the annual event.

== The White House Project ==
In 1998, while still at the Ms. Foundation, Wilson created the White House Project a national non-profit organization that aimed to advance women's leadership in all communities and sectors, up to the U.S. presidency. through training programs for women candidates and activists.

In 2004, Wilson and the White House Project collaborated with Mattel and Toys "R" Us to create the Barbie for President doll to encourage girls to become leaders.

During Wilson's time with the White House Project, she led a number of initiatives, including the launch of the Vote, Run, Lead initiative in 2004, launched the, which has successfully trained and empowered 15,000 of women to run for office and to vote. With offices in five cities, reaching 15 states, VRL was the largest political training program for women. In 2007, Wilson led in the creation of the first International Women Leaders Global Security Summit. The Summit brought together 70 female leaders from 36 countries. Wilson also formed the largest U.S. delegation to travel to Chile for the inauguration of Michelle Bachelet, the first freely elected female president in South America, and afterwards organized a 500-person event in D.C. introducing Bachelet to women leaders in the U.S., including Hillary Clinton, Sen. Susan Collins, and Supreme Court Justice Ruth Bader Ginsburg, among others.

== Awards and honors ==
Wilson was named the Woman of the Year in 2013 by the YES WE CAN Center. Wilson is a member of the Women's Leadership Board at Harvard Kennedy School, an Athena Fellow at Barnard College, and chairs the advisory board of VoteRunLead.

Other awards include:

- The New York Women's Foundation "Celebrating Women Award," 2008
- MAKERS: Women Who Make America, 2012
- Presidential Award for Excellence in Microenterprise Development, 2001
- Council on Foundations Robert W. Scrivner Award for Creative Grantmaking, 2002
- Drake University Alumni Achievement Award, 1999
- Changing the Face of Philanthropy Women's Leadership Award, 1996
- Official U.S. delegate, Fourth World Conference on Women, Beijing, 1995

Honorary

- Doctor of Divinity, Episcopal Divinity School, 2011
- Doctor of Humane Letters, Chatham College, 2004
- Doctor of Public Service, Drake University, 2000

== Personal life ==
Wilson married Nancy Ann Lee in 2009. She has five children: Eugene III, Renee, Kirsten, David and Martin Wilson. And twelve grandchildren: Asha Lee, Treme Wilson, Batia, Joshua, Salla, Mariah, Harrison, Peyton, Mica, Zachary Marine, Alec and Tre. She resides in New York City and spends free time in Woodstock, New York.
