= Job shadow =

Type of on-the-job learning

Job shadowing (or work shadowing) is a type of on-the-job learning. It may be a part of an onboarding process, or part of a career or leadership development program. Job shadowing involves following and observing another employee who might have a different job in hand, have something to teach, or be able to help the person who is shadowing learn new aspects related to the job, organization, certain behaviors or competencies.

- New job training: An individual planning to take up a different role in the same organization may be asked to shadow the current incumbent for a couple of days to a couple of months to get a better idea of their role. This helps the individuals who are shadowing to understand the particulars of the job without the commitment of the responsibility. This allows the individual to be more confident, aware, and better prepared to take up the role. For the organization, job training reduces the chances of failure, and reduces the time required for the individual to be fully productive.
- Career development: With multiple options available for an individual to grow in an organization, job shadowing can help to get a better sense of options available and the required competencies for these position options. An employee may shadow senior employees in various positions or functions to appreciate and get a better idea of what it takes to build a career there.
- Developing expertise: At the core of job shadowing is its ability to transmit knowledge and expertise from one individual to another. By doing planned work, job shadowing can support knowledge management and ensure that expertise and knowledge are not lost.
- Leadership development: Many organizations use job shadowing as a tool for leadership development. Aspiring leaders are given opportunities to shadow senior leaders and learn from them. It complements classroom learning and aspiring leaders get to experience first hand what it takes to be a leader.

Job shadowing helps both parties to learn and exchange ideas. It helps in networking, exploring opportunities, giving/receiving feedback, and collaboration with different departments.

== See also ==
- Externship
- Take Our Kids to Work Day
