= Sally Boynton Brown =

American political strategist

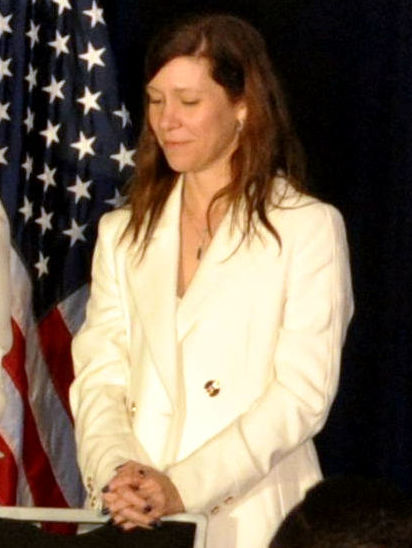

President of the Florida Democratic Party
- In office April 26, 2017 – November 20, 2017
- Preceded by: Scott Arceneaux

Personal details
- Born: Sally Ann Wilson; 1975 or 1976 (age 48–49) Middleton, Idaho, U.S.
- Party: Democratic
- Spouse: Burr Boynton
- Children: 3
- Education: Boise State University (BA)
- Website: Official website

Sally Boynton Brown (née Sally Ann Wilson) is an American political strategist who served as the executive director of the Idaho Democratic Party from 2012 to 2017. She was also a candidate for the Democratic National Committee chairmanship election in 2017.

== Early life and education ==
Brown was born into a working-class family and grew up in Idaho. She attended Boise State University and received her B.A. in Communications in 2005.

== Idaho Democratic Party ==
Brown first started working for the Idaho Democratic Party in early 2011 as a field director, and became communications director in November 2011. She assumed the executive director position in March 2012.

Brown worked on Idaho Representative Sue Chew’s legislative campaign in 2006, and as campaign manager for Representative Phylis King’s re-election campaign in 2008. She worked for Keith G. Allred's gubernatorial campaign as Director of Operations in 2010.

In 2013, Brown expanded her work nationwide by starting the Lead discussion group, with the goal of increasing participation of women leaders within the Democratic Party.

She oversaw the largest Democratic caucus in the nation in Ada County, Idaho in 2016.

She was the president of the Association of State Democratic Party Executive Directors.

Brown announced on April 21, 2017 that she would step down from being the executive director of the Idaho Democratic Party. She was replaced by the party's communications director, Dean Ferguson, pending a search for a full-time replacement.

== Candidacy for chair of the Democratic National Committee ==
Brown announced her candidacy for the chair of the Democratic National Committee on December 16, 2016. Her candidacy was considered a long shot inasmuch as Rep. Keith Ellison, South Bend Mayor Pete Buttigieg, and former Labor Secretary Tom Perez each had some degree of national recognition; ultimately she achieved third place (after Buttigieg's resignation) before dropping out, having won twelve votes in the first round.

=== Controversy ===
On January 23, 2017, Brown became the subject of controversy when during the Democratic National Committee Chair Candidates Forum in Washington, D.C. she said in regard to the Black Lives Matter movement that Democrats need to offer "training" that teaches white people "how to be sensitive and how to shut their mouths if they are white." Brown went on to say that "It makes me sad that we're even having that conversation and that tells me that white leaders in our party have failed," she said. "I'm a white woman, I don't get it... My job is to listen and be a voice and shut other white people down when they want to interrupt... This is life and death" she continued. "I am a human being trying to do good work and I can't do it without y'all. So please, please, please, get ahold of me... I need schooling so I can go school the other white people."

== Florida Democratic Party ==
It was announced on April 26, 2017 that the Florida Democratic Party had hired Brown as its president (executive director). She succeeded Scott Arceneaux, the top party administrator for the previous seven years. She resigned in November after she was accused of enabling sexual harassment from former chair Stephen Bittel.
