= 2014 New Hampshire Senate election =

- November 4, 2014

All 24 seats in the New Hampshire Senate 13 seats needed for a majority

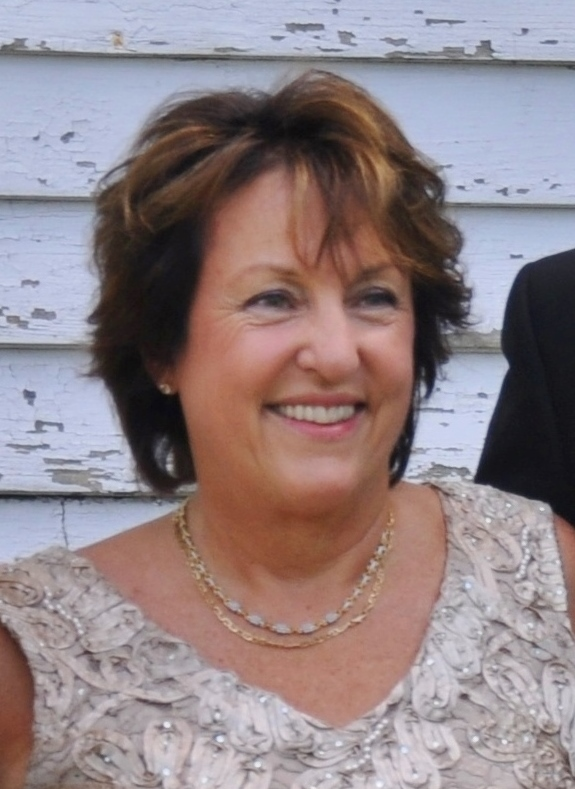
	Majority party	Minority party
Leader	Chuck Morse	Sylvia Larsen (retired)
Party	Republican	Democratic
Leader since	September 3, 2013
Leader's seat	District 22	District 15
Last election	13	11
Seats after	14	10
Seat change	▲1	▼1
Popular vote	230,950	233,544
Percentage	49.72%	50.28%
President of the Senate before election
Chuck Morse
Republican
Elected President of the Senate
Chuck Morse
Republican

The 2014 New Hampshire Senate election was held on November 4, 2014, to determine which party would control the New Hampshire Senate for the following two years in the 164th New Hampshire General Court. All 24 seats in the New Hampshire Senate were up for election and the primary was held on September 9, 2014. Prior to the election, 13 seats were held by Republicans and 11 seats were held by Democrats. The general election saw Republicans expanding their majority by a single seat.

== Predictions ==
Source	Ranking	As of
Governing	Lean R	October 20, 2014

== Retirements ==
=== Democrats ===
1. District 15: Sylvia Larsen retired.

=== Republicans ===
1. District 8: Bob Odell retired.
2. District 19: Jim Rausch retired.

== Closest races ==
Seats where the margin of victory was under 10%:

1. District 7, 0.82%
2. District 12, 1.50% (gain)
3. District 18, 6.42%
4. District 9, 6.52%

== Results ==
=== District 1 ===
District 1 election, 2014
Party	Candidate	Votes	%
Democratic	Jeff Woodburn (incumbent)	10,829	60.18%
Republican	Mark Evans	7,166	39.82%
Total votes		17,995	100.0%
Democratic hold			

=== District 2 ===
District 2 election, 2014
Party	Candidate	Votes	%
Republican	Jeanie Forrester (incumbent)	12,657	62.73%
Democratic	Carolyn Mello	7,521	37.27%
Total votes		20,178	100.0%
Republican hold			

=== District 3 ===
District 3 election, 2014
Party	Candidate	Votes	%
Republican	Jeb Bradley (incumbent)	14,409	64.44%
Democratic	John White	7,950	35.56%
Total votes		22,359	100.0%
Republican hold			

=== District 4 ===
District 4 election, 2014
Party	Candidate	Votes	%
Democratic	David H. Watters (incumbent)	10,121	55.65%
Republican	Eddie Edwards	8,067	44.35%
Total votes		18,188	100.0%
Democratic hold			

=== District 5 ===
District 5 election, 2014
Party	Candidate	Votes	%
Democratic	David Pierce (incumbent)	18,474	100.0%
Total votes		18,474	100.0%
Democratic hold			

=== District 6 ===
District 6 election, 2014
Party	Candidate	Votes	%
Republican	Sam Cataldo (incumbent)	9,882	56.40%
Democratic	Richard Leonard	7,640	43.60%
Total votes		17,522	100.0%
Republican hold			

=== District 7 ===
District 7 election, 2014
Party	Candidate	Votes	%
Democratic	Andrew Hosmer (incumbent)	9,578	50.41%
Republican	Kathleen Lauer-Rago	9,423	49.59%
Total votes		19,001	100.0%
Democratic hold			

=== District 8 ===
District 8 election, 2014
Party	Candidate	Votes	%
Republican	Jerry Little	12,033	55.50%
Democratic	Linda Tanner	9,649	44.50%
Total votes		21,682	100.0%
Republican hold			

=== District 9 ===
District 9 election, 2014
Party	Candidate	Votes	%
Republican	Andy Sanborn (incumbent)	12,310	53.26%
Democratic	Lee Nyquist	10,804	46.74%
Total votes		23,114	100.0%
Republican hold			

=== District 10 ===
District 10 election, 2014
Party	Candidate	Votes	%
Democratic	Molly Kelly (incumbent)	14,034	100.0%
Total votes		14,034	100.0%
Democratic hold			

=== District 11 ===
District 11 election, 2014
Party	Candidate	Votes	%
Republican	Gary L. Daniels	12,754	59.80%
Democratic	Roger Tilton	8,575	40.20%
Total votes		21,329	100.0%
Republican hold			

=== District 12 ===
District 12 election, 2014
Party	Candidate	Votes	%
Republican	Kevin Avard	10,839	50.75%
Democratic	Peggy Gilmour (incumbent)	10,517	49.25%
Total votes		21,356	100.0%
Republican gain from Democratic			

=== District 13 ===
District 13 election, 2014
Party	Candidate	Votes	%
Democratic	Bette Lasky (incumbent)	8,729	56.84%
Republican	Doris Hohensee	6,628	43.16%
Total votes		15,357	100.0%
Democratic hold			

=== District 14 ===
District 14 election, 2014
Party	Candidate	Votes	%
Republican	Sharon Carson (incumbent)	11,742	63.71%
Democratic	Kate Messner	6,689	36.29%
Total votes		18,431	100.0%
Republican hold			

=== District 15 ===
District 15 election, 2014
Party	Candidate	Votes	%
Democratic	Dan Feltes	13,352	65.11%
Republican	Lydia Dube Harman	7,154	34.89%
Total votes		20,506	100.0%
Democratic hold			

=== District 16 ===
District 16 election, 2014
Party	Candidate	Votes	%
Republican	David Boutin (incumbent)	11,666	55.76%
Democratic	Maureen Raiche Manning	9,255	44.24%
Total votes		20,921	100.0%
Republican hold			

=== District 17 ===
District 17 election, 2014
Party	Candidate	Votes	%
Republican	John Reagan (incumbent)	11,669	58.20%
Democratic	Nancy R.B. Fraher	8,382	41.80%
Total votes		20,051	100.0%
Republican hold			

=== District 18 ===
District 18 election, 2014
Party	Candidate	Votes	%
Democratic	Donna Soucy (incumbent)	8,266	53.21%
Republican	George Lambert	7,268	46.79%
Total votes		15,534	100.0%
Democratic hold			

=== District 19 ===
District 19 election, 2014
Party	Candidate	Votes	%
Republican	Regina Birdsell	11,561	61.38%
Democratic	Kristi St. Laurent	7,275	38.62%
Total votes		18,836	100.0%
Republican hold			

=== District 20 ===
District 20 election, 2014
Party	Candidate	Votes	%
Democratic	Lou D'Allesandro (incumbent)	7,973	57.94%
Republican	Eileen Landies	5,787	42.06%
Total votes		13,760	100.0%
Democratic hold			

=== District 21 ===
District 21 election, 2014
Party	Candidate	Votes	%
Democratic	Martha Fuller Clark (incumbent)	12,423	60.87%
Republican	Phil Nazzaro	7,987	39.13%
Total votes		20,410	100.0%
Democratic hold			

=== District 22 ===
District 22 election, 2014
Party	Candidate	Votes	%
Republican	Chuck Morse (incumbent)	12,928	65.61%
Democratic	Richard O'Shaughnessy	6,777	34.39%
Total votes		19,705	100.0%
Republican hold			

=== District 23 ===
District 23 election, 2014
Party	Candidate	Votes	%
Republican	Russell Prescott (incumbent)	12,030	57.44%
Democratic	Donna Schlachman	8,915	42.56%
Total votes		20,945	100.0%
Republican hold			

=== District 24 ===
District 24 election, 2014
Party	Candidate	Votes	%
Republican	Nancy Stiles (incumbent)	14,990	60.43%
Democratic	Chris Muns	9,816	39.57%
Total votes		24,806	100.0%
Republican hold			
