= Senator Sullivan =

Senator Sullivan may refer to:

== Members of the United States Senate ==
- Dan Sullivan (U.S. senator) (born 1964), U.S. Senator from Alaska since 2015
- Patrick Joseph Sullivan (1865–1935), U.S. Senator from Wyoming from 1929 to 1930
- William V. Sullivan (1857–1918), U.S. Senator from Mississippi from 1898 to 1901

== United States state senate members ==
- Charles F. Sullivan (1904–1962), Massachusetts State Senate
- Christopher D. Sullivan (1870–1942), New York State Senate
- Dan Sullivan (Arkansas politician) (fl. 2010s–2020s), Arkansas State Senate
- Dave Sullivan (Illinois politician) (born 1964), Illinois State Senate
- Francis D. Sullivan (fl. 1960s), Ohio State Senate
- George Sullivan (Nebraska politician) (1900–1972), Nebraska State Senate
- George H. Sullivan (1867–1935), Minnesota State Senate
- Henry P. Sullivan (1916–2003), New Hampshire State Senate
- Jim Sullivan (Wisconsin politician) (born 1967), Wisconsin State Senate
- John Andrew Sullivan (1868–1927), Massachusetts State Senate
- John M. Sullivan (politician) (born 1959), Illinois State Senate
- John S. Sullivan (1875–1949), Massachusetts State Senate
- Kate Sullivan (politician) (born 1950), Nebraska State Senate
- Kevin Sullivan (politician) (born 1949), Connecticut State Senate
- Leo J. Sullivan (1905–1963), Massachusetts State Senate
- Mike Sullivan (pitcher) (1870–1906), Massachusetts State Senate
- Nancy Sullivan (politician) (born 1949), Maine State Senate
- Nancy Achin Sullivan (1959–2022), Massachusetts State Senate
- Peter F. Sullivan (1869–1931), Massachusetts State Senate
- Samuel Sullivan (politician) (1773–1853), Ohio State Senate
- Timothy Sullivan (1862–1913), New York State Senate
- Tom Sullivan (Colorado politician) (born 1956), Colorado State Senate
- Victoria Sullivan (born 1968), New Hampshire State Senate
- William P. Sullivan (1870–1925), Missouri State Senate
- William Sullivan (Kentucky politician) (1921–2013), Kentucky State Senate

== See also ==
- Senator O'Sullivan (disambiguation)
