= Senator Cilley (disambiguation) =

Joseph Cilley (1791–1887) (1791–1887) was a U.S. Senator from New Hampshire from 1846 to 1847. Senator Cilley may also refer to:

- Jackie Cilley (born 1951), New Hampshire State Senate
- Joseph Cilley (1734–1799) (1734–1799), New Hampshire State Senate
