= John Gallus (politician) =

American politician

Member of the New Hampshire Senate from the 1st district
- In office December 4, 2002 – December 2012
- Preceded by: Harold Burns
- Succeeded by: Jeff Woodburn

Personal details
- Party: Republican
- Spouse: Peggy

John Gallus is a Republican former member of the New Hampshire Senate, representing the 1st District from 2002 to 2012. Previously he was a member of the New Hampshire House of Representatives from 1996 until 2002.
