= Andre Martel =

American businessman and politician

Member of the New Hampshire House of Representatives from the 44th Hillsborough district
- In office December 5, 2012 – December 22, 2016
- Succeeded by: Mark McLean

Member of the New Hampshire Senate from the 18th district
- In office 2002–2006
- Preceded by: Daniel P. O'Neil
- Succeeded by: Betsi DeVries

Member of the New Hampshire House of Representatives from the 45th Hillsborough district
- In office 1998–2002

Personal details
- Born: December 16, 1946 Manchester, New Hampshire
- Died: December 22, 2016 (aged 70) Manchester, New Hampshire
- Party: Republican
- Spouse: Simone Leclerc
- Education: New Hampshire College (BS)

Military service
- Allegiance: United States
- Branch/service: United States Army
- Years of service: 1965–1968

Andre A. "Andy" Martel (December 16, 1946 – December 22, 2016) was an American businessman and Republican politician.

Born in Manchester, New Hampshire, Martel graduated from Bishop Bradley High School in 1964 and New Hampshire College (now Southern New Hampshire University) in 1971. Martel also took graduate classes at Emerson College, Wellesley College, Cornell University, and Princeton University.

He worked in various businesses as a general manager and auditor. Martel served in the New Hampshire House of Representatives from 1998 to 2002 and from 2012 until his death and served in the New Hampshire State Senate for the 18th district from 2002 to 2006. Martel died at Catholic Medical Center in Manchester, New Hampshire.
