= Fenton Groen =

American politician

Member of the New Hampshire House of Representatives from the Strafford 23rd district
- In office December 2, 2020 – December 2022
- Preceded by: Sandra Keans

Member of the New Hampshire Senate from the 6th district
- In office December 2010 – December 2012
- Preceded by: Jackie Cilley
- Succeeded by: Sam Cataldo

Personal details
- Born: January 1950 (age 76)
- Party: Republican

Fenton L. Groen (born January 1950) is a New Hampshire politician who previously served in the New Hampshire House of Representatives from 2020 to 2022. He formerly served in the New Hampshire Senate from 2010 to 2012.
