= Kathy Sullivan (American politician) =

American lawyer

Chair of the New Hampshire Democratic Party
- In office February 1999 – March 25, 2007
- Preceded by: Jeff Woodburn
- Succeeded by: Raymond Buckley

Personal details
- Born: June 21, 1954 (age 72) Manchester, New Hampshire, U.S.
- Party: Democratic
- Spouse: John Rist
- Relatives: Henry P. Sullivan (father)
- Education: College of the Holy Cross (BA); Cornell University (JD)

Kathleen Sullivan (born June 21, 1954) is an American attorney, and former chairwoman of the New Hampshire Democratic Party.

== Early life and education ==
Sullivan was born on June 21, 1954, in Manchester, New Hampshire. Her father, Henry P. Sullivan (1916–2003), was an attorney, state senator, state representative, and candidate for governor. Her mother, the former Mary McCaffrey (1919–1997), was a state representative.

Sullivan graduated from the College of the Holy Cross with a B.A. in 1977 and earned her Juris Doctor (J.D.) from Cornell Law School in 1981.

== Career ==
Sullivan served as the chairperson of the New Hampshire Democratic Party. She served as a member of the United States Electoral College in 2008, when she cast one of New Hampshire's four Electoral Votes for Barack Obama and Joe Biden. She was a superdelegate for Hillary Clinton in 2016.

Sullivan appears in the Marlo Poras documentary Run Granny Run about Doris Haddock's 2004 U.S. Senate campaign.

Sullivan served as Treasurer of In This Together, a Political action committee created by Kentucky Governor Andy Beshear

== Personal life ==
Sullivan is married to John Rist, the principal of Manchester Central High School.

Party political offices
Preceded by Jeff Woodburn	Chair of the New Hampshire Democratic Party; 1999–2007	Succeeded by Raymond Buckley
