= Tom DeBlois =

American politician (born 1945)

Member of the New Hampshire Senate from the 18th district
- In office December 1, 2010 – December 5, 2012
- Preceded by: Betsi DeVries
- Succeeded by: Donna Soucy

Personal details
- Born: April 22, 1945 (age 81) Manchester, New Hampshire, U.S.
- Party: Republican
- Spouse: Peggy McGuire
- Education: University of New Hampshire

Military service
- Allegiance: United States
- Branch/service: United States Army; United States Army Reserve

Thomas H. DeBlois (born April 22, 1945) is an American politician who formerly served as a member of the New Hampshire Senate for the 18th district. A member of the Republican Party, he was elected in 2010, defeating incumbent Betsi DeVries. In 2012, he decided not to seek a second term and, instead, ran for the 4th district seat on the Executive Council of New Hampshire, narrowly losing the Republican nomination.

== Electoral history ==
Date	Election	Candidate	Party	Votes	%
New Hampshire Senate, 18th district
Nov 2, 2010	General	Thomas H. DeBlois	Republican	8,439	56.57
Nov 2, 2010	General	Betsi L. DeVries	Democratic	6,450	43.23
Nov 2, 2010	General	Scatter		30	0.20
Nov 2, 2010	General	Incumbent lost; seat switched from Democratic to Republican			

New Hampshire Senate
Preceded by Betsi DeVries	New Hampshire Senator for the 18th District; 2010–2012	Succeeded by Donna Soucy
