= Senator Downing =

Senator Downing may refer to:

- Benjamin Downing (born 1981), Massachusetts State Senate
- Bernard Downing (1869–1931), New York State Senate
- Coe S. Downing (1791–1847), New York State Senate
- Henry H. Downing (1853–1919), Virginia State Senate
- Michael Downing (politician) (born 1954), New Hampshire State Senate
- Philip Downing (1871–1961), Wisconsin State Senate
- Thomas J. Downing (1867–1927), Virginia State Senate
