= Joshua Query =

American politician

Member of the New Hampshire House of Representatives from the 16th Hillsborough district
- In office December 6, 2018 – December 7, 2022 Serving with Barbara Shaw
- Preceded by: Victoria Sullivan

Personal details
- Party: Democratic

Joshua Query is an American politician from Manchester, New Hampshire who served as a member of the New Hampshire House of Representatives from 2018 to 2022. They represented the Hillsborough 16th District as a member of the Democratic Party. Query was re-elected to the statehouse in 2020 as New Hampshire’s first genderqueer representative. Query is running for State Representative in the 2024 cycle in the Hillsborough 20th district.

== Electoral history ==
2018 New Hampshire House of Representatives election, Hillsborough's 16th district
Party	Candidate	Votes	%
Democratic	Barbara Shaw (incumbent)	1,614	30.6
Democratic	Joshua Query	1,290	24.4
Republican	Victoria Sullivan (incumbent)	1,213	23.0
Republican	Thomas Robert	1,164	22.0
Total votes		5,281	100

2020 New Hampshire House of Representatives election, Hillsborough's 16th district
Party	Candidate	Votes	%
Democratic	Barbara Shaw (incumbent)	2,330	30.6
Democratic	Joshua Query (incumbent)	1,810	23.8
Republican	Robert Kliskey	1,776	23.3
Republican	Steven Stefanik	1,704	22.4
Total votes		7,620	100

== Personal life ==
Query is genderqueer, and uses they/them pronouns.
