= Senator DeVries =

Senator DeVries may refer to:

- Betsi DeVries (born 1955), New Hampshire State Senate
- Edna DeVries (born 1941), Alaska State Senate
