= Senator Soucy =

Senator Soucy may refer to:

- David Soucy (born 1957), Vermont State Senate
- Donna Soucy (born 1967), New Hampshire State Senate
