= Kelly Murphy (disambiguation) =

Kelly Murphy is an American author, illustrator and educator.

Kelly Murphy may also refer to:

- Kelly Noonan Murphy (born 1974 or 1975), American politician
- Kelly Murphy (volleyball) (born 1989), American indoor volleyball player
- Kelly Murphy (cyclist) (born 1989), Irish racing cyclist

== See also ==
- Kelleigh Murphy, American politician
