= Henry Sullivan =

Henry Sullivan may refer to:

== Politicians ==
- Henry Sullivan (Australian politician) (1921–1977)
- Henry P. Sullivan (1916–2003), American politician
- Sir Henry Sullivan, 2nd Baronet (1785–1814), member of parliament (MP) for Lincoln and army officer

== Others ==
- Henry Sullivan (swimmer) (1892–1955), American marathon swimmer
- Henry Sullivan (composer) (1895–1975), American composer, songwriter, and pianist

== See also ==
- Harry Sullivan (disambiguation)
