= Massachusetts House of Representatives' 23rd Middlesex district =

American legislative district

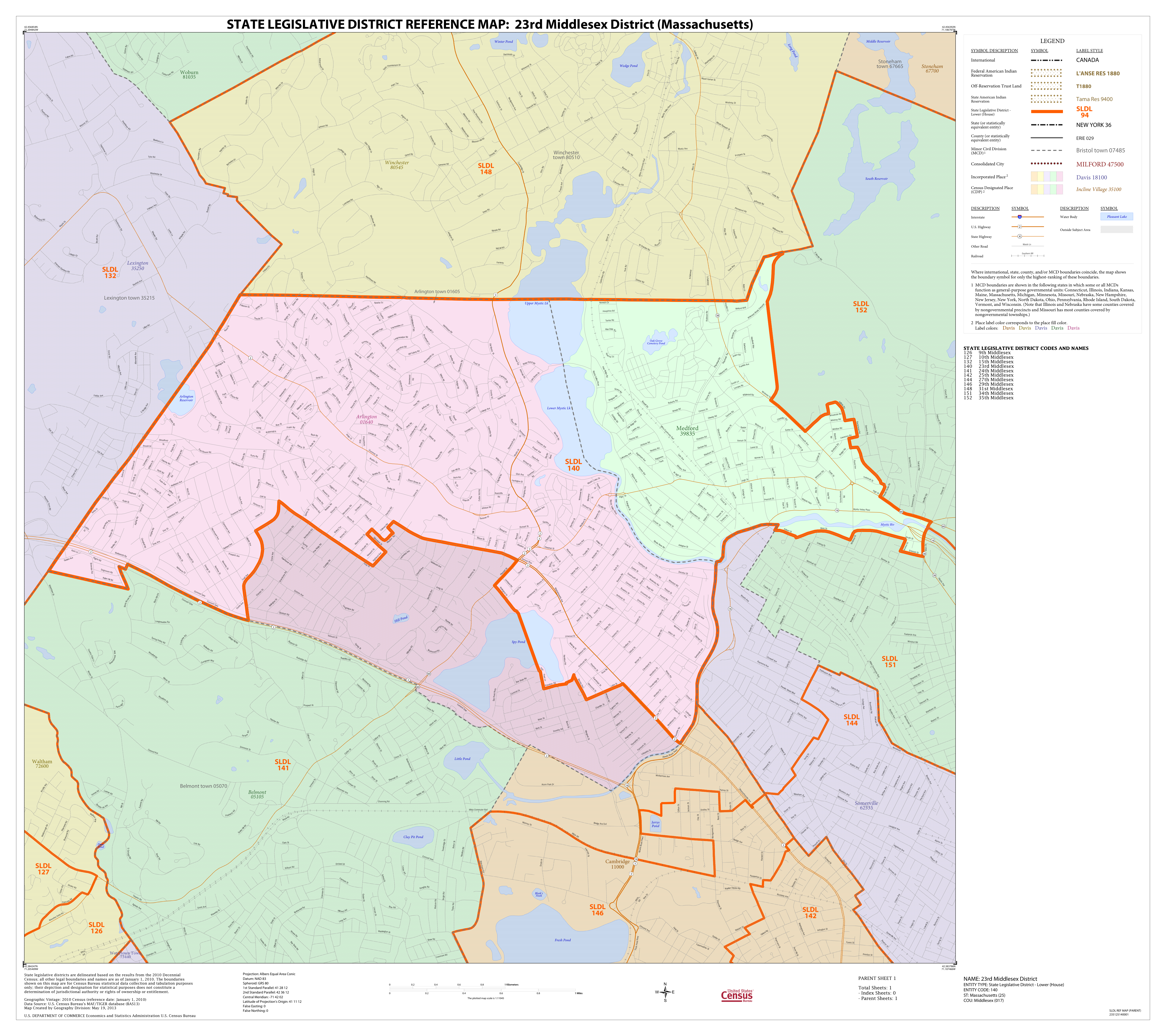
Map of Massachusetts House of Representatives' 23rd Middlesex district, based on the 2010 United States census.

Massachusetts House of Representatives' 23rd Middlesex district in the United States is one of 160 legislative districts included in the lower house of the Massachusetts General Court. It covers part of Middlesex County. Democrat Sean Garballey of Arlington has represented the district since 2009.

== Locales represented ==
The district includes the following localities:

- part of Arlington
- part of Medford

The current district geographic boundary overlaps with those of the Massachusetts Senate's 2nd Middlesex and 4th Middlesex districts.

=== Former locales ===
The district previously covered:

- Melrose, circa 1872
- South Reading, circa 1872
- Stoneham, circa 1872

== Representatives ==
- Horatio G. F. Corliss, circa 1858
- Sullivan Tay, circa 1858–1859
- William G. Wise, circa 1858
- Marcus A. Thomas, circa 1859
- Jno. C. Woodward, circa 1859
- Peter J. Brady, circa 1888
- Charles M. Austin, circa 1920
- William Fleming, circa 1920
- Harvey E. Frost, circa 1920
- Edward L. Kerr, circa 1951
- William Walter Kirlin, circa 1951
- George Keverian, circa 1975
- Jim Marzilli
- Sean Garballey, 2009–current

== See also ==
- List of Massachusetts House of Representatives elections
- List of Massachusetts General Courts
- List of former districts of the Massachusetts House of Representatives
- Other Middlesex County districts of the Massachusetts House of Representatives: 1st, 2nd, 3rd, 4th, 5th, 6th, 7th, 8th, 9th, 10th, 11th, 12th, 13th, 14th, 15th, 16th, 17th, 18th, 19th, 20th, 21st, 22nd, 24th, 25th, 26th, 27th, 28th, 29th, 30th, 31st, 32nd, 33rd, 34th, 35th, 36th, 37th

== Images ==
Portraits of legislators

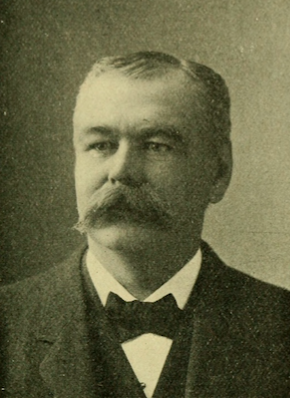
Charles Davenport

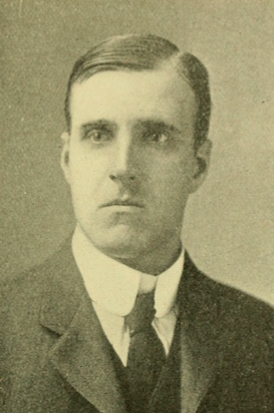
Frank Bayrd

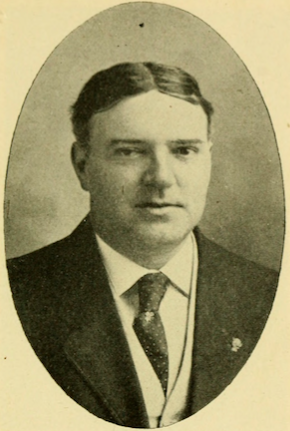
Thomas Riley

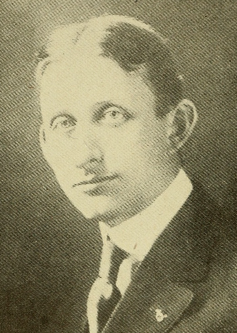
Charles Austin

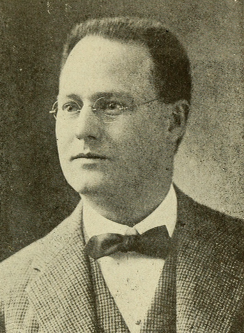
Charles Underhill

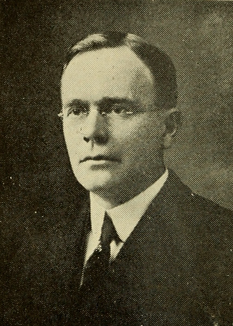
William Fleming

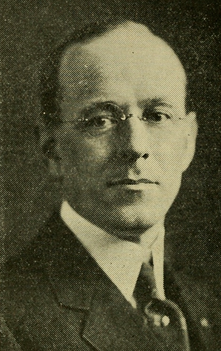
Francis Smith

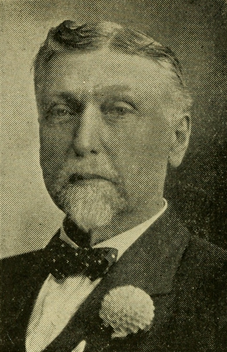
Walter Herbert Snow

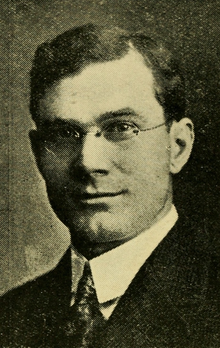
William Bell

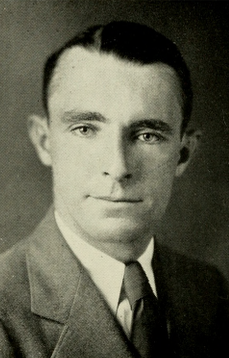
Edward Brady

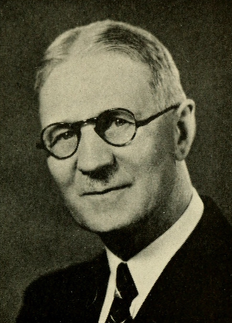
Clark Partridge

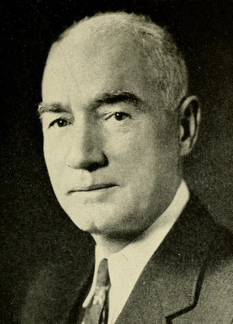
John Vaughan

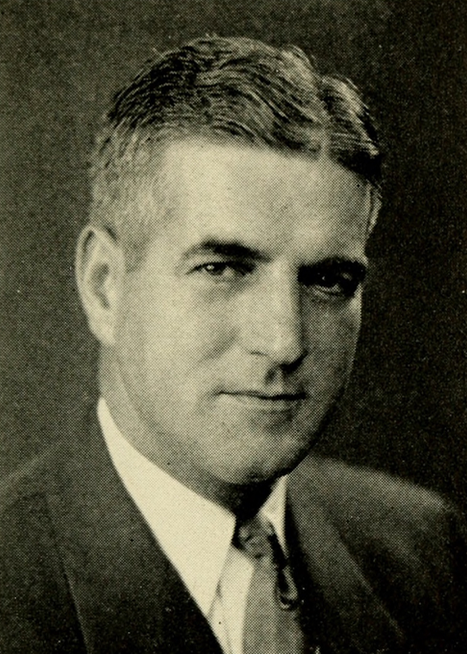
Edward Kerr

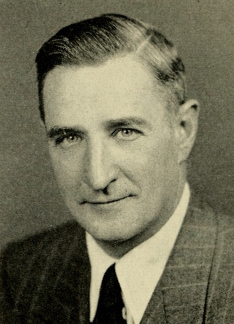
William Walter Kirlin

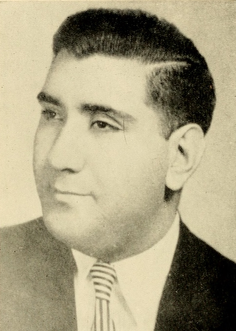
Gregory Khachadoorian

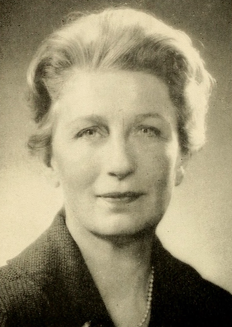
Janet Kirkland Starr

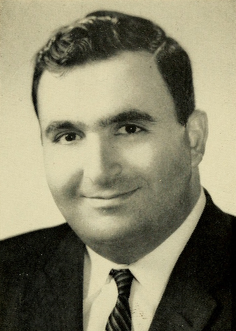
George Keverian

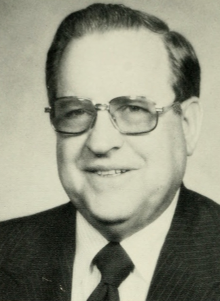
Robert Vigneau

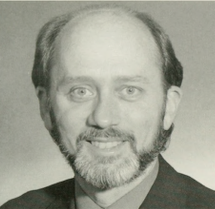
J. James Marzilli

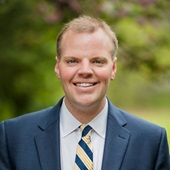
Sean Garballey
