= Martha Hennessey =

American politician

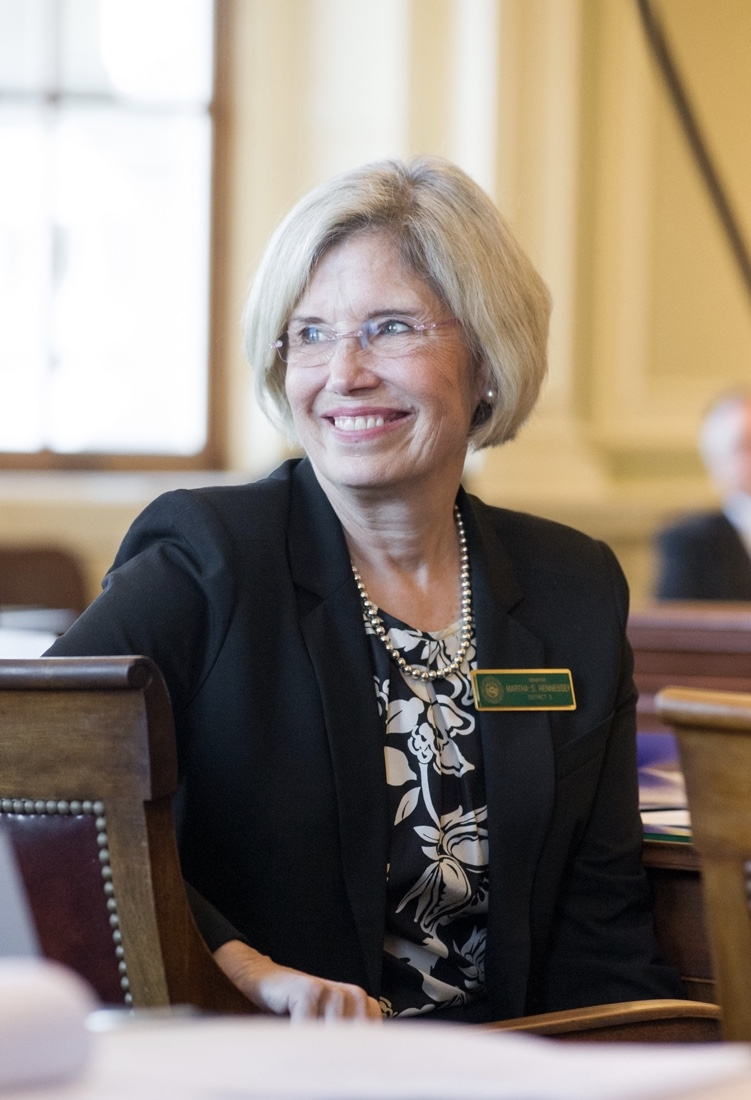

Member of the New Hampshire Senate from the 5th district
- In office December 7, 2016 – December 2, 2020
- Preceded by: David Pierce
- Succeeded by: Suzanne Prentiss

Member of the New Hampshire House of Representatives from the Grafton 12th district
- In office December 3, 2014 – December 7, 2016
- Preceded by: Multi-member district
- Succeeded by: Multi-member district

Personal details
- Born: February 2, 1954 (age 72) Seattle, Washington
- Party: Democratic

Martha S. Hennessey (born February 2, 1954) is an American politician who served in the New Hampshire Senate for the 5th district from 2016 until 2020. She was the chair of the Senate Judiciary Committee, and served on Transportation and Health and Human Services Committees. She previously served on the Children and Family Law Committee in the New Hampshire House of Representatives for the Grafton 12 district from 2014 to 2016.

Hennessey graduated from Dartmouth College (1976), with a degree in psychology and from the University of Pennsylvania, with an MBA (Wharton) and PhD in developmental psychology. She practiced as an educational psychologist in Massachusetts and New Hampshire, before joining the NH legislature. She is married to Stephen Severson, and they have three children (Kristina, Tucker, and Elizabeth) and 6 granddaughters.
