= Peggy Gilmour =

American politician

Member of New Hampshire Senate for District 12
- In office 2012–2014

Member of New Hampshire Senate for District 12
- In office 2008–2010

Personal details
- Party: Democratic
- Education: Boston University

Peggy Gilmour is an American politician who served as a Democratic member of the New Hampshire Senate for the 12th district from 2008 to 2010 and again from 2012 to 2014.
