= Harold Burns (politician) =

American politician (1926–2013)

Member of the New Hampshire Senate from the 1st district
- In office December 6, 2000 – December 4, 2002
- Preceded by: Frederick W. King, Sr.
- Succeeded by: John T. Gallus

Speaker of the New Hampshire House of Representatives
- In office December 5, 1990 – December 4, 1996
- Preceded by: Doug Scamman Jr.
- Succeeded by: Donna Sytek

Member of the New Hampshire House of Representatives from the Coös 5th district
- In office December 1, 1982 – December 4, 1996
- Preceded by: Otto H. Oleson; Lawrence J. Guay
- Succeeded by: John E. Tholl

Member of the New Hampshire House of Representatives from the Coös 4th district
- In office December 4, 1968 – December 1, 1982
- Preceded by: Ada C. Taylor
- Succeeded by: Lynn C. Horton

Personal details
- Born: December 4, 1926 Whitefield, New Hampshire, U.S.
- Died: March 24, 2013 (aged 86) Whitefield, New Hampshire, U.S.
- Party: Republican
- Spouse: Eleanor Ann Burns
- Profession: Businessman

Harold Burns (December 4, 1926 – March 24, 2013) was an American politician who represented the 1st district in the New Hampshire Senate from 2000 to 2002, and earlier in the New Hampshire House of Representatives.

== Background ==
Born in Whitefield, New Hampshire, Burns served in the United States Army and owned an insurance business Burns Insurance Agency.

== Political career ==
Burns served in the New Hampshire House of Representatives from 1968 to 1996 and served as speaker from 1991 to 1996. He then served in the New Hampshire State Senate beginning in 2000 and retired in 2002. From 2005 to 2012 he was town moderator for Whitefield, New Hampshire.

== Death ==
Burns died of cancer on March 24, 2013, at the age of 86 and is survived by two sons, John and Scott, both of Whitefield, and a daughter, Sandra McCay, of Hydesville, California. He was predeceased by his wife, Eleanor Ann Burns, in 1997.

== Legacy ==
Burns Bridge in Whitefield was renamed in his honor in 2013.

== Notes ==
New Hampshire House of Representatives
Preceded by Ada C. Taylor	Member of the New Hampshire House of Representatives from the Coös 4th district 1968–1982	Succeeded by Lynn C. Horton
Preceded by Otto H. Oleson; Lawrence J. Guay	Member of the New Hampshire House of Representatives from the Coös 5th district 1982–1996	Succeeded by John E. Tholl
Political offices
Preceded by Doug Scamman Jr.	Speaker of the New Hampshire House of Representatives; 1990–1996	Succeeded by Donna Sytek
New Hampshire Senate
Preceded by Frederick W. King, Sr.	Member of the New Hampshire Senate from the 1st district 2000–2002	Succeeded by John T. Gallus
