= Wenyen Gabriel =

South Sudanese-American basketball player (born 1997)

- Gabriel in 2026

No. 32 – Beşiktaş Fuzul
- Position: Center / power forward
- League: Basketbol Süper Ligi; EuroLeague

Personal information
- Born: March 26, 1997 (age 29) Khartoum, Sudan
- Listed height: 6 ft 9 in (2.06 m)
- Listed weight: 212 lb (96 kg)

Career information
- High school: Trinity (Manchester, New Hampshire); Wilbraham & Monson Academy (Wilbraham, Massachusetts)
- College: Kentucky (2016–2018)
- NBA draft: 2018: undrafted
- Playing career: 2018–present

Career history
- 2018–2020: Sacramento Kings
- 2018–2019: →Stockton Kings
- 2020: Portland Trail Blazers
- 2020–2021: New Orleans Pelicans
- 2021–2022: Wisconsin Herd
- 2021: Brooklyn Nets
- 2021–2022: Los Angeles Clippers
- 2022–2023: Los Angeles Lakers
- 2023–2024: Wisconsin Herd
- 2024: Memphis Grizzlies
- 2024: Vaqueros de Bayamón
- 2024: Maccabi Tel Aviv
- 2024–2025: Panathinaikos
- 2025–2026: Bayern Munich
- 2026–present: Beşiktaş

Career highlights
- Greek Cup winner (2025); Nike Hoop Summit (2016)
- Stats at NBA.com
- Stats at Basketball Reference

Wenyen Makuac Gabriel (born March 26, 1997) is a South Sudanese-American professional basketball player for Beşiktaş of the Turkish Basketbol Süper Ligi (BSL) and the EuroLeague. He played college basketball for the Kentucky Wildcats, after being a 5-star prospect in 2016, ranked as high as #14 on ESPN's Top 100. Gabriel has also played in the NBA for the Sacramento Kings, Portland Trail Blazers, New Orleans Pelicans, Brooklyn Nets, Los Angeles Clippers, Los Angeles Lakers, and the Memphis Grizzlies.

== High school career ==
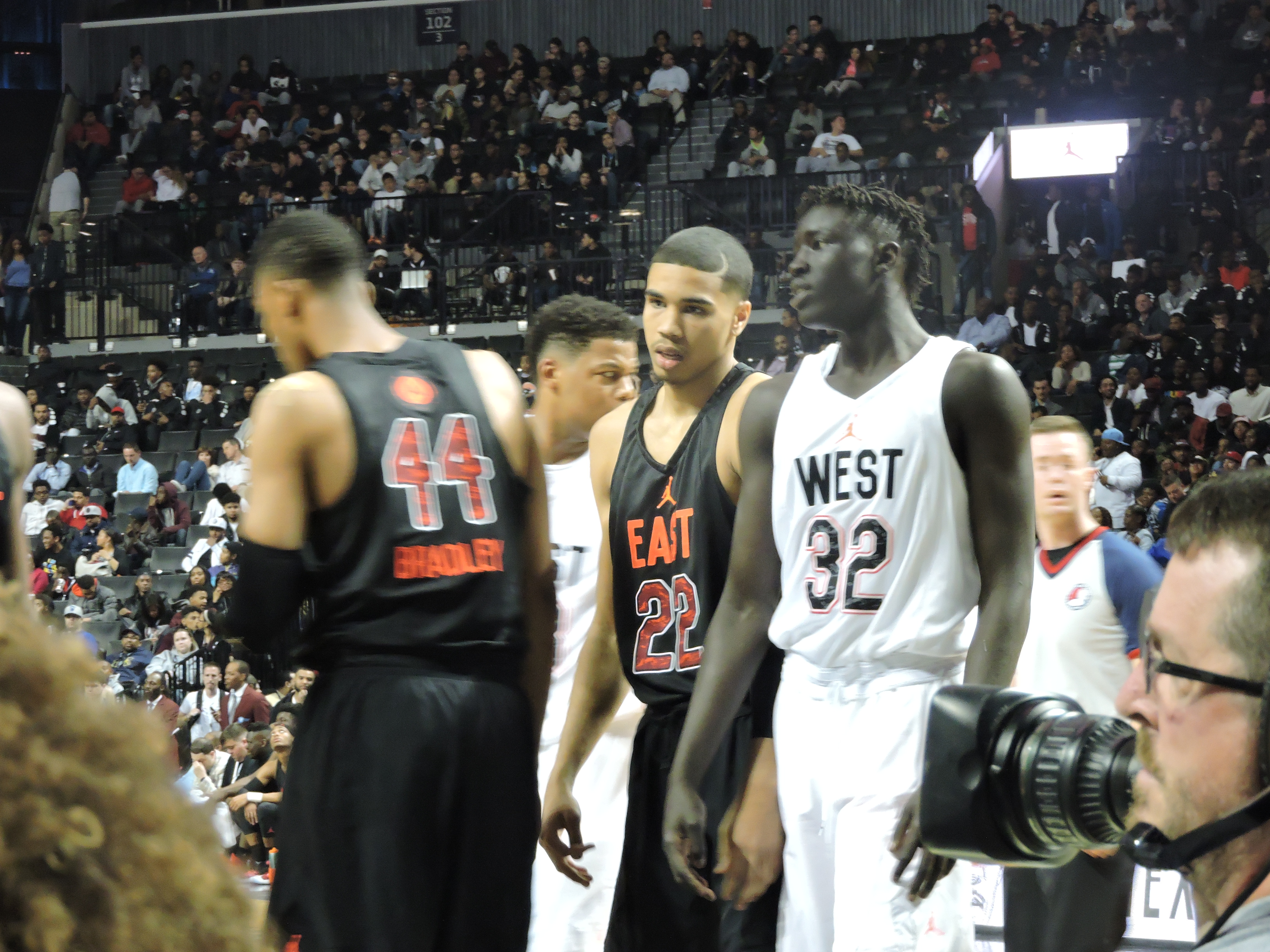
Gabriel (32) at the 2016 Jordan Brand Classic

Gabriel attended Wilbraham & Monson Academy in Wilbraham, Massachusetts beginning in 2014. Prior to that, he played at Trinity High School in Manchester, New Hampshire for three years. As a senior in 2015–16, he averaged 22.0 points per game, 14.0 rebounds per game, 7.0 blocks per game and 6.3 assists per game. In October 2015, he announced his decision to enroll at the University of Kentucky. Maryland, Duke, UConn and Providence were other schools on his shortlist. He played 19:17 minutes in the 2016 Nike Hoop Summit, scoring two points, grabbing four rebounds and dishing out two assists. He also played in the 2016 Jordan Brand Classic. Gabriel was rated as a five-star recruit and ranked #14 in the Class of 2016 by ESPN.

== College career ==
He made his debut for the Kentucky Wildcats in an exhibition game on October 31, 2016, against Clarion University, tallying nine points, two rebounds and one assist in 17 minutes coming off the bench. As a freshman, he played in 38 games, including 23 starts, averaging 4.6 points and 4.8 rebounds in 17.8 minutes. During his sophomore year, Gabriel became more of a key figure for Kentucky's success that season, tallying 6.8 points and 5.4 rebounds in 37 games. He led Kentucky with 40 blocked shots.

== Professional career ==
=== Sacramento Kings (2018–2020) ===
Gabriel declared for the 2018 NBA draft, but went undrafted. He joined the Sacramento Kings for the 2018 NBA Summer League. On July 31, 2018, he signed a two-way contract with the Kings. However, he did not appear in a game during that season.

Just prior to the start of the 2019–20 season, the Kings converted Gabriel's contract to a standard deal. He had a double-double of 16 points and 16 rebounds for the Stockton Kings on December 20, 2019, in a win over the Delaware Blue Coats. On January 11, 2020, Gabriel had 37 points, 11 rebounds and three assists for Stockton in its 163–143 win over the Iowa Wolves.

=== Portland Trail Blazers (2020) ===
On January 20, 2020, Gabriel was traded to the Portland Trail Blazers along with Trevor Ariza and Caleb Swanigan in exchange for Kent Bazemore, Anthony Tolliver and two future second round picks. He made his debut for the Trail Blazers on January 31, going 0-for-3 from the field with one rebound, one assist and a block in 13 minutes as the Blazers defeated the Los Angeles Lakers 127–119.

=== New Orleans Pelicans (2020–2021) ===
On November 30, 2020, Gabriel signed with the New Orleans Pelicans. In 21 games with the team he averaged 11.5 minutes, 3.5 points, 2.69 rebounds, and 0.4 blocks per game. He was waived just prior to the start of the 2021–22 season.

=== Wisconsin Herd (2021) ===
In October 2021, Gabriel joined the Wisconsin Herd as an affiliate player. In 12 games he averaged 13.8 points on 47.5 percent shooting from the field and 38.7 percent shooting from 3-point range, 8.6 rebounds, 1.0 assists, 1.1 steals and 2.0 blocks in 25.8 minutes per contest.

=== Brooklyn Nets (2021) ===
On December 21, 2021, Gabriel signed a 10-day contract with the Brooklyn Nets. He played one game for the team.

=== Los Angeles Clippers (2021–2022) ===
On December 31, 2021, Gabriel signed a 10-day contract with the Los Angeles Clippers. He signed a third 10-day contract with the Clippers on January 11, 2022.

=== Second stint with Wisconsin (2022) ===
Following the expiration of his second 10-day contract, Gabriel was re-acquired by the Wisconsin Herd on January 21.

On January 29, 2022, Gabriel signed a 10-day contract with the New Orleans Pelicans. He did not play in a game for the Pelicans before his deal expired. On February 8, he was reacquired by the Herd.

=== Los Angeles Lakers (2022–2023) ===
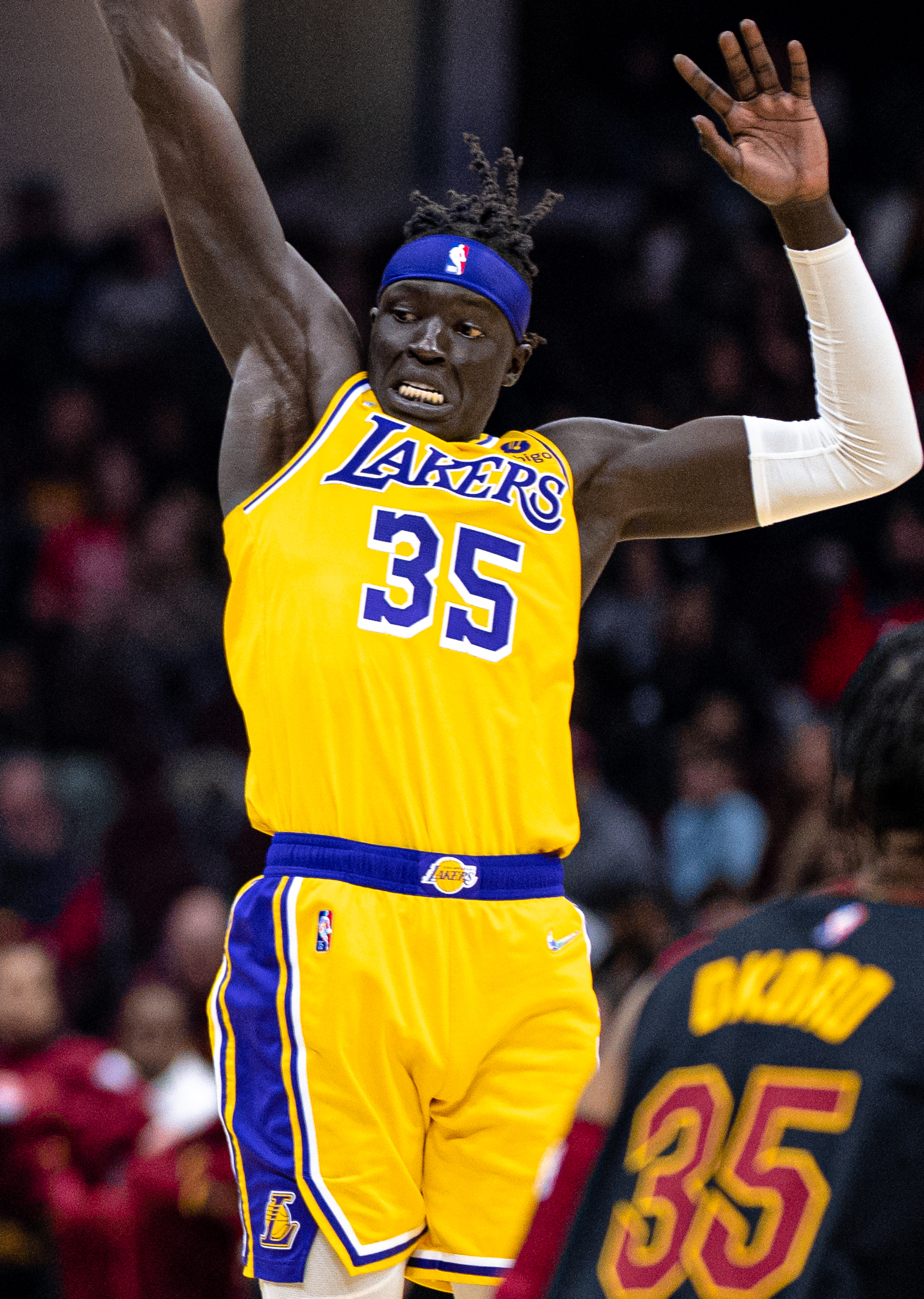
Gabriel with the Los Angeles Lakers in 2022

On March 1, 2022, Gabriel signed a two-way contract with the Los Angeles Lakers. On April 8, 2022, the Los Angeles Lakers converted Gabriel's two-way contract into a two-year standard contract. With the Lakers, in 68 games in which he played 15.1 minutes per game, he averaged 5.5 points, 4.2 rebounds, and 0.5 blocks per game, with a .596 field goal percentage.

On October 3, 2023, Gabriel signed with the Boston Celtics, but was waived on October 20.

=== Third stint with Wisconsin / Memphis Grizzlies (2023–2024) ===
On October 30, 2023, Gabriel joined the Wisconsin Herd and on March 8, 2024, he signed a 10-day contract with the Memphis Grizzlies. With Memphis, in five games he averaged 16.2 minutes, 3.4 points, 5.0 rebounds, and 0.4 blocks per game. On March 18, he returned to Wisconsin.

=== Vaqueros de Bayamón (2024) ===
On March 11, 2024, Gabriel signed with Vaqueros de Bayamón. In 23 games he averaged 13.0 points, 7.4 rebounds, and 1.3 blocks (7th in the league) per game, with a .576 field goal percentage.

=== Maccabi Tel Aviv (2024) ===
On July 10, 2024, Gabriel signed a two-year deal with Maccabi Tel Aviv of the Israeli Basketball Premier League and the Euroleague. During September he suffered an injury that left him out for 3–4 weeks.

=== Panathinaikos (2024–2025) ===
Wenyen Gabriel signed with Panathinaikos of the Greek Basketball League and the EuroLeague on December 23, 2024, to fill the gap left by Mathias Lessort until the end of the season.

During his time with the team, Gabriel made an immediate impact, averaging 6.0 points, 3.9 rebounds, and 0.9 blocks per game in the EuroLeague, and posting a career-high 16 points against Crvena Zvezda on April 11, 2025. His energetic playing style, defensive presence, and versatility quickly endeared him to Panathinaikos fans, who appreciated his hustle and commitment on the court.

At the end of the season, Gabriel left the team due to restrictions on the number of foreign players in the Greek Basketball League, with his roster spot being given to veteran NBA center Richaun Holmes.

=== Bayern Munich (2025–2026) ===
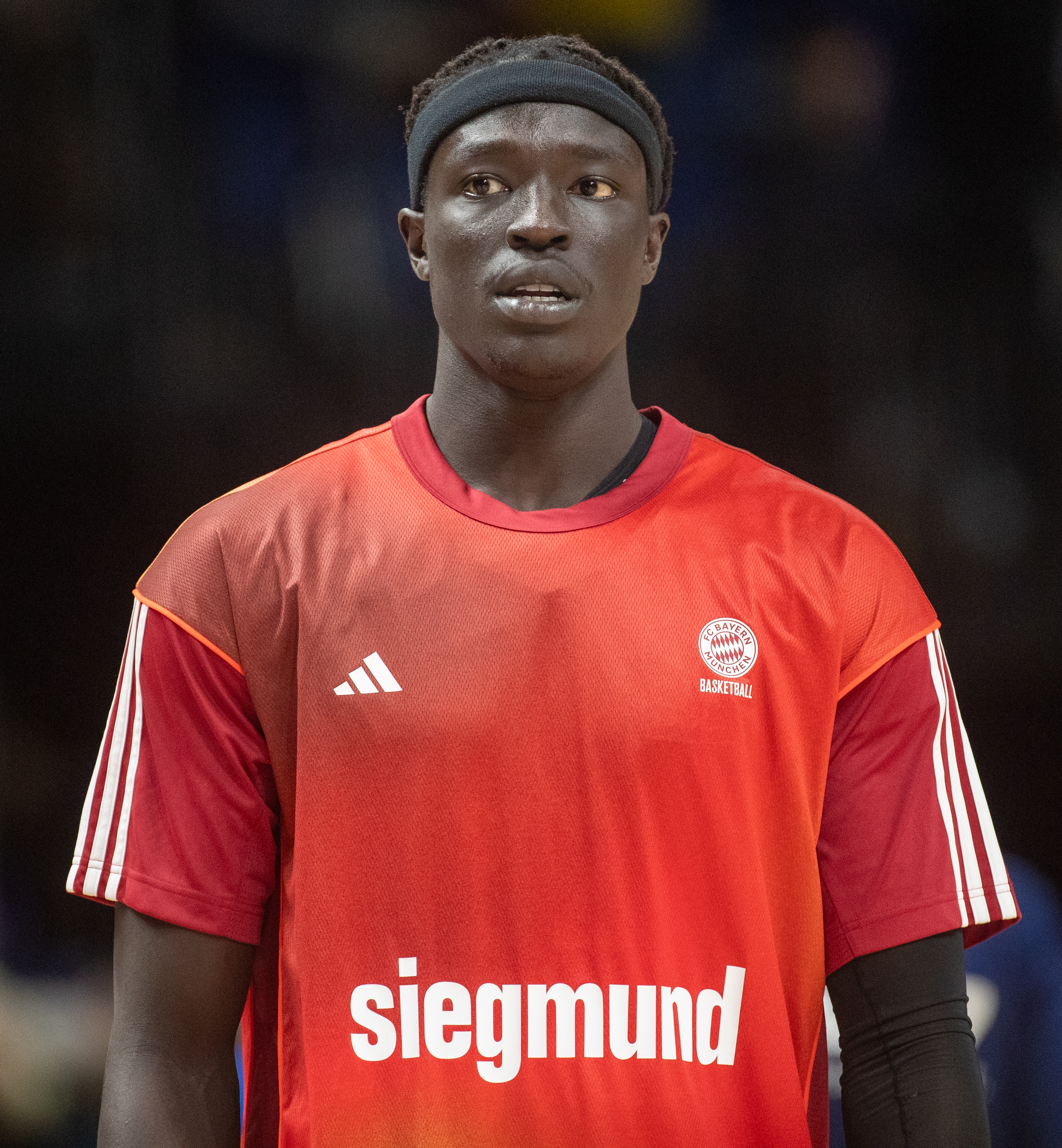
Gabriel in 2025

On June 28, 2025, Gabriel signed with Bayern Munich of the German Basketball Bundesliga and EuroLeague.

=== Beşiktaş (2026–present) ===
On July 31, 2026, Gabriel signed with Beşiktaş of the Turkish Basketbol Süper Ligi (BSL) and the EuroLeague.

== National team career ==
Gabriel joined the South Sudan national team in August 2023, as he was selected in the roster for the 2023 FIBA Basketball World Cup, where South Sudan made their international debut. Gabriel and the South Sudanese team made history for the nation by placing first out of all African nations at the tournament. The team was granted automatic qualification for the 2024 Paris Olympics men's basketball tournament, a first for the team and Gabriel.

== Career statistics ==
Legend
GP	Games played	GS	Games started	MPG	Minutes per game
FG%	Field goal percentage	3P%	3-point field goal percentage	FT%	Free throw percentage
RPG	Rebounds per game	APG	Assists per game	SPG	Steals per game
BPG	Blocks per game	PPG	Points per game	**Bold**	Career high

=== NBA ===
==== Regular season ====
Year	Team	GP	GS	MPG	FG%	3P%	FT%	RPG	APG	SPG	BPG	PPG
2019–20	Sacramento	11	0	5.6	.353	.125	.600	.9	.3	.3	.2	4.7
2019–20	Portland	19	1	9.1	.484	**.417**	**.750**	2.2	.3	**.4**	.3	4.7
2020–21	New Orleans	21	0	11.5	.400	.406	.647	2.6	.5	**.4**	.4	3.4
2021–22	Brooklyn	1	0	1.3	—	—	—	1.0	.0	.0	.0	6.8
2021–22	L.A. Clippers	6	0	7.7	.385	.400	.500	2.3	.3	.2	.3	7.1
2021–22	L.A. Lakers	19	**5**	**16.4**	.505	.261	.605	4.3	**.6**	.2	**.5**	**6.7**
2022–23	L.A. Lakers	**68**	2	15.1	**.596**	.278	.619	4.2	.5	**.4**	**.5**	6.7
2023–24	Memphis	5	0	16.2	.364	.167	.000	**5.0**	**.6**	**.4**	.4	7.7
Career		150	8	12.9	.524	.311	.606	3.4	.5	.4	.4	6.8

==== Playoffs ====
Year	Team	GP	GS	MPG	FG%	3P%	FT%	RPG	APG	SPG	BPG	PPG
2020	Portland	4	**2**	**13.3**	**.600**	**.400**	.500	**2.5**	**1.0**	**.5**	**.5**	**5.3**
2023	L.A. Lakers	**10**	0	3.7	.400	—	**.667**	.9	.0	.2	.3	1.0
Career		14	2	6.5	.520	.400	.600	1.4	.3	.3	.4	2.2

=== College ===
Year	Team	GP	GS	MPG	FG%	3P%	FT%	RPG	APG	SPG	BPG	PPG
2016–17	Kentucky	**38**	**23**	17.7	.405	.317	.618	4.8	**.7**	.3	.9	4.6
2017–18	Kentucky	37	7	**23.1**	**.442**	**.396**	**.625**	**5.4**	.6	**.8**	**1.1**	**6.8**
Career		75	30	20.3	.426	.367	.622	5.1	.6	.5	1.0	5.7

== Personal life ==
Gabriel was born in Khartoum, Sudan, on March 26, 1997. Because his sister – born a year earlier – had died in infancy, Gabriel was given the name "Wenyen", which means "wipe your tears" in his native Dinka language. Two weeks after he was born, Gabriel's mother, Rebecca Gak, moved with him and his three siblings to Cairo, Egypt to escape the violence of the Second Sudanese Civil War. While Gabriel's mother worked to earn enough money to move his father, Makuac, to Cairo, his seven-year-old brother, Komot, became Gabriel's primary care giver. Two years after moving to Egypt, the United Nations granted an appeal to move the refugee family to Manchester, New Hampshire, an American city with a large South Sudanese population.

Gabriel became a US citizen in 2017 when his parents became citizens. He received his paperwork and passport in 2015, and represented the USA Basketball Junior National Select Team at the 2016 Nike Hoop Summit. In 2016, he said he still considers South Sudan his home.
