= Michael Downing (politician) =

American politician

Mike Downing

Member of the New Hampshire Senate from the 22nd district
- In office 2006–2010
- Preceded by: Chuck Morse
- Succeeded by: Chuck Morse

Personal details
- Born: October 20, 1955 Malden, Massachusetts
- Died: April 17, 2015 (aged 59)
- Party: Republican
- Spouse: Heidi Downing
- Education: Southern New Hampshire University; Franklin Pierce University

Michael "Mike" Downing (October 20, 1954 - April 17, 2015) was the Sheriff of Rockingham County, New Hampshire, having served in that role from his election in 2010 until his cancer related death in 2015.

Downing was a Republican member of the New Hampshire Senate, representing the 22nd district from 2006 to 2010. He was also a member of the New Hampshire House of Representatives from 1996 until 2002.

== Early life and education ==
Downing was born in Malden, Massachusetts. He earned his associate degree from New Hampshire College (now Southern New Hampshire University) and his bachelor's degree from Franklin Pierce University.

== 2006 campaign ==
After a three-way Republican primary, Mike Downing ran against Democrat Beth Roth for the open seat that was vacated by Chuck Morse who gave up the seat to run for the New Hampshire Executive Council.

== 2010 election ==
Downing stepped down from the Senate in order to run for Sheriff of Rockingham County. He defeated 5 other candidates to win the Republican primary.

No Democrats appeared on the primary ballot. Police officer Shannon Coyle of Derry waged a write-in campaign for the Democratic primary, and won the nomination. Independent Dorothy Heyl also ran in the general election.

On election day, Downing won with 60% of the vote, compared to 30% for Coyle and 9% for Heyl.

Preceded by Chuck Morse	New Hampshire State Senate, 22nd district 2006 – 2010	Succeeded by Chuck Morse
