= Jackie Cilley =

American politician

Jacalyn L. Cilley

Member of the New Hampshire House of Representatives from the Strafford 4th district
- In office December 3, 2014 – December 5, 2018

Member of the New Hampshire Senate from the 6th district
- In office January 3, 2007 – December 1, 2010
- Preceded by: Richard Green
- Succeeded by: Fenton Groen

Member of the New Hampshire House of Representatives from the Barrington ? district
- In office 2004–2006

Personal details
- Born: August 5, 1951 (age 75) Berlin, New Hampshire, U.S.
- Party: Democratic
- Spouse: Bruce
- Education: University of New Hampshire

Jacalyn L. Cilley (born August 5, 1951) is a former Democratic member of the New Hampshire House of Representatives, representing the Strafford 4th District, and a former member of the New Hampshire Senate for the 6th district.

== Biography ==
Jacalyn Cilley was born in Berlin, New Hampshire on August 5, 1951. Her father, Archie Edward Rowe, was a trucker and Korean War veteran and her mother Celestine Phyllis Currier worked in a textile factory. She was raised with many siblings in a third-floor walk-up tenement in Berlin.

She graduated in 1969 from Berlin High School. In her late 20s as a separated single mother she decided to proceed to higher education and enrolled in the University of New Hampshire at Durham, becoming the first member of her extended family to attend college. She received her BA in psychology in 1983 and her MBA in 1985 from the university's Whittemore School of Business and Economics and has been an adjunct professor at the School, now the Peter T. Paul College of Business and Economics, for over twenty years.

For fifteen years she owned and operated Cilley & Associates, a research consulting service providing information and market assistance to local businesses. She is a partner in her husband's farrier supply company Horseshoes Plus, Inc.

In 2004 she ran for a seat in the New Hampshire House of Representatives and won. She subsequently served for two terms as a New Hampshire Senator, representing the 6th District from 2006 to 2010, when she was defeated for re-election by Republican Fenton Groen.

In 2012 she ran an unsuccessful primary campaign for the Democratic nomination for Governor of New Hampshire, losing to Maggie Hassan, former majority leader of the New Hampshire Senate, who would continue on to be elected as the 81st holder of that office.

Cilley was elected to the State House again in 2014. She was re-elected in 2016 and decided not to run again in 2018.
