= Trinity High School (Manchester, New Hampshire) =

Location
- 581 Bridge Street; Manchester, (Hillsborough County), New Hampshire 03104-5395; United States; 42°59′42″N 71°26′17″W

Information
- Type: Private
- Motto: "Pride, Spirit, Tradition"
- Religious affiliation: Roman Catholic
- Established: 1970
- President: Nathan Stanton
- Principal: Michael Gaumount
- Chaplain: Rev. Eric C. Ouellette
- Faculty: 30
- Grades: 9–12
- Average class size: 16
- Student to teacher ratio: 1:12.7
- Campus: Suburban
- Colors: Red, white and blue
- Athletics conference: NHIAA
- Team name: Pioneers
- Accreditation: New England Association of Schools and Colleges
- Newspaper: The Pioneer
- Tuition: $12,750 (‘19-‘20)
- Website: www.trinity-hs.org

Trinity High School is a private, Catholic high school located in Manchester, New Hampshire. It is operated by the Roman Catholic Diocese of Manchester.

As of 2010, 445 students attended Trinity High School. Every member of the class of 2010 was accepted into college. It was the fourth year in a row this has occurred.

== History ==
The school opened on September 9, 1970, as part of a merger of three Catholic high schools in Manchester: Bishop Bradley High School, Immaculata High School, and Saint Anthony's High School. The only remaining Catholic high school in the city, Ste. Marie's, remained independent but eventually closed in 1973.

The school's college preparatory curriculum features a Catholic emphasis. Students of all faiths are welcome to attend, but classes on the Catholic faith are required of all students.

It is accredited by the National Catholic Educational Association.

== Sports and extracurricular clubs ==
The school competes at the Class "L" level in 21 boys', girls' and coed varsity sports. The football team currently competes in Division III. The teams are known by the mascot name "Pioneers". In the fall of 2019, the football team won the Division III state championship.

The school fields a FIRST Robotics Competition Team, which competed on the national level in 2011. The team now fields a VEX Robotics team that competes on the local and world level.

The Trinity boys' basketball team won the Class "L" championship against Dover High School at UNH's Lundholm Gym in 1985. In 2009, after two consecutive years with championship losses, the Trinity Pioneers won the Class "L" basketball championship, and again in 2013, this time versus Bishop Guertin High School.

The varsity cheerleading team currently has five state championships.

== Notable alumni ==
- Tunji Awojobi (born 1973), Nigerian professional basketball player
- Luke Bonner, former professional basketball player (Austin Toros)
- Chris Carpenter, St. Louis Cardinals pitcher and Cy Young Award winner
- Joanne Dow, U.S. Olympic racewalker
- Jeff Fulchino, Washington Nationals pitcher
- Wenyen Gabriel (born 1997), South Sudanese-American basketball player for Maccabi Tel Aviv of the Israeli Basketball Premier League
- James Georgopoulos, visual artist
- Gérald Lacroix, Cardinal of the Roman Catholic Church, Archbishop of Québec
- Mike LaValliere, former major league catcher for the Pittsburgh Pirates
- Andre Martel, New Hampshire businessman and state legislator; graduated from Bishop Bradley High School in 1964
- Dan Mullen, head football coach, UNLV; former head football coach at Mississippi State University and the University of Florida
