= Don Leeman =

American politician

Member of New Hampshire House of Representatives for Strafford 23
- In office 2014 – May 27, 2016
- Preceded by: David Miller
- Succeeded by: Sandra Keans

Personal details
- Party: Republican

Don Evans Leeman is an American politician. He represented Strafford 23rd district on the New Hampshire House of Representatives from 2014 to 2016. He resigned after being charged by New Hampshire Attorney General Joseph A. Foster. The charges were later dropped. In 2020, he was a primary candidate for Strafford 10th district.
