= Matthew Houde =

American politician

Member of the New Hampshire House of Representatives from the Sullivan 1st district
- In office 2006–2008

Member of the New Hampshire Senate from the 5th district
- In office 2008–2012
- Preceded by: Peter Burling
- Succeeded by: David Pierce

Personal details
- Party: Democratic

Matthew Houde is an American politician. He served as a Democratic member for the Sullivan 1st district of the New Hampshire House of Representatives. He also served as a member for the 5th district of the New Hampshire Senate.
