= Carrie Gendreau =

American politician from New Hampshire

Member of the New Hampshire Senate from the 1st district
- In office December 7, 2022 – December 4, 2024
- Preceded by: Erin Hennessey
- Succeeded by: David Rochefort

Personal details
- Born: 1961 or 1962 (age 64–65) Littleton, New Hampshire
- Party: Republican
- Education: Bob Jones University

Carrie L. Gendreau is an American politician from Littleton, New Hampshire. She served as a Republican Senator for the 1st district of the New Hampshire Senate, and previously was a member of the Littleton Board of Selectmen.

Gendreau graduated from Bob Jones University, and was a sorority chaplain during her time there.

Gendreau is a self-identified evangelical Christian. During her time on the Littleton Board of Selectmen, Gendreau would occasionally open meetings with a prayer, and she carried a Bible with her to debates in the New Hampshire Senate. She told the New York Times, "I will listen to my constituents, but if the Lord trumps the majority, I will go with that." After community protests, she did not seek reelection and was succeeded by Kerri Harrington.

She attracted international attention after protesting a mural of a "white iris in front of a rainbow color wheel ...two birch trees in front of blue mountains and a white crescent moon ... [and] dandelions growing from the pages of a book". Gendreau believed "the iris was a dangerous symbol because Iris was the Greek goddess of the rainbow".

Gendreau's father was Littleton moderator Gerald Winn.
