= David Miller (New Hampshire politician) =

American politician

Member of New Hampshire House of Representatives for Strafford 23
- In office 2012–2014
- Succeeded by: Don Leeman

Personal details
- Party: Democratic
- Education: Plymouth State University

David P. Miller is an American politician. He represented Strafford 23rd district on the New Hampshire House of Representatives from 2012 to 2014.
