= Erin Hennessey =

American politician (born 1976)

Member of the New Hampshire Senate from the 1st district
- In office December 2, 2020 – June 7, 2022
- Preceded by: David Starr
- Succeeded by: Carrie Gendreau

Member of the New Hampshire House of Representatives from the Grafton 1st district
- In office December 3, 2014 – December 2, 2020
- Preceded by: Ralph Doolan Jr.
- Succeeded by: Joseph DePalma IV

Personal details
- Born: January 1, 1976 (age 50)
- Party: Republican
- Education: Boston College (BS)

Erin Tapper Hennessey (born January 1, 1976) is an American politician serving as the Deputy Secretary of State of New Hampshire. She was formerly a member of the New Hampshire Senate from the 1st district, serving from 2020 to 2022.

== Education ==
Hennessey earned a Bachelor of Science degree in management and accounting from Boston College.

== Career ==
From 1998 to 2001, Hennessey worked as a senior associate at PricewaterhouseCoopers. She was then a senior corporate auditor for the Callaway Golf Company. From 2004 to 2007, she was a project manager for Resources Global Professionals. She was also a sales manager at Peabody & Smith Realty, Inc. She served as a member of the New Hampshire House of Representatives for the Grafton 1st district from 2014 to 2020. She was then elected to the New Hampshire Senate, where she has served as vice chair of the education committee.
