= Donna Schlachman =

American politician

Member of New Hampshire House of Representatives for Rockingham 18
- In office 2008–2014

Personal details
- Born: July 18, 1949 (age 77) New York
- Party: Democratic
- Education: Columbia University; University of New Hampshire

Donna Schlachman (born July 18, 1949) is an American politician. She represented Rockingham 18th district at the New Hampshire House of Representatives from 2008 to 2014. She was vice chair of the House Commerce and Consumer Affairs Committee. She was a Democratic candidate for District 23 in the 2014 New Hampshire Senate election.
