= Raymond Buckley =

American politician and current Chair of the New Hampshire Democratic Party

Ray Buckley
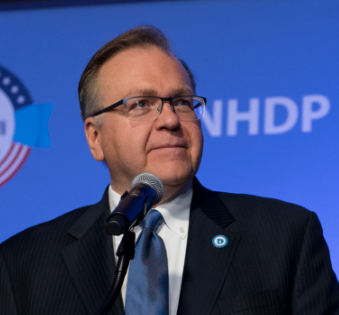

Chair of the New Hampshire Democratic Party
- Incumbent
- Assumed office March 25, 2007
- Preceded by: Kathy Sullivan

Member of the New Hampshire House of Representatives from the 44th Hillsborough district
- In office 1986–2004
- Preceded by: Nancy Bridgewater
- Succeeded by: Betsi DeVries

Personal details
- Born: 1959 (age 66–67)
- Party: Democratic

Raymond Buckley (born 1959) is an American politician from the state of New Hampshire who currently serves as chair of the New Hampshire Democratic Party. Buckley previously served as President of the Association of State Democratic Chairs, and as a Vice Chair of the Democratic National Committee. On December 21, 2016 he announced his candidacy to be Chair of the DNC in its chairmanship election. He withdrew his candidacy February 18, 2017.

He is a member of the New Hampshire delegation to the Democratic National Committee, and served as the chairman of the eastern region of the Democratic National Committee from 2001 to 2009. He has also been director of the NH Democratic Senate Caucus, and from 1998 to 2007 served as the City Democratic Chair for Manchester. As of March 25, 2007 he is the state chair of the New Hampshire Democratic Party. Buckley was reelected state chair in 2009, 2011, 2013, 2015, 2017, 2019, and 2021.

Buckley served 8 terms (1986–2004) as a member of the New Hampshire House of Representatives where he represented southern Manchester, and served as Party Whip in that body. He was a delegate to the Democratic National Convention from New Hampshire in 1988, 1996, 2000, 2004 and 2008. He served as the vice chair of the New Hampshire Democratic Party from 1999 to March 2007, when he was elected as chair.

== Political career ==
=== Early involvement ===
Buckley's first involvement in Democratic Party politics was at age eight, when he campaigned for a gubernatorial candidate by making homemade signs. As a twelve-year-old in 1972, he was volunteering for the Ed Muskie primary presidential campaign. By the age of fourteen, he was an acting town party chairman for the town of Canterbury, New Hampshire. As a young man, he was taken under the wing of state party boss Chris Spirou, who mentored him. In high school, he worked on the campaign of future President Jimmy Carter. He was elected to the New Hampshire Democratic State Committee at the age of 18, and was elected treasurer of that body by the age of 21.

=== State legislator ===
His first election to state office was in 1986, where he was elected to the General Court to represent Manchester's 8th ward. As a state legislator, he served 18 years, many as the Party Whip. He successfully sponsored over 150 bills into law, including a 1999 repeal of the state's ban on adoption by homosexual couples, a repeal of state taxes on hospitals, and anti-bullying legislation. In 1998, he gained some notoriety when he led a delegation of N.H. House Democrats to walk out on a speech given by Newt Gingrich. That same year, he also won the Lawrence O'Brien Award, an award given by the Democratic National Committee to its top party members. In 2002, he gained additional national prominence when his party's phone lines were jammed by a Republican Party consulting firm.

While a legislator, he has also frequently worked on presidential campaigns for prominent Democratic candidates. He campaigned for Michael Dukakis in 1988, and notably in 2003–2004, he was a member of Senator Joseph Lieberman's campaign staff. His own personal vehicle, a Chrysler PT Cruiser decorated as the "JoeMobile", served as a prominent symbol for that campaign.

He is credited with leading his party to prominence in New Hampshire, a former Republican stronghold, although he has also been chastised for controversial fundraising efforts that have led to that rise. Despite being leading the party to prominence, he has also been known to be at the center of several bitter intra-party feuds, including a 1981 attempt to impeach then Party Chair Richard Boyer and a divisive campaign for the top party spot in 1988 against Joe Grandmaison, which Buckley would lose.

=== Post-legislature career ===
Buckley left the New Hampshire House of Representatives in 2004 to run for the Executive Council of New Hampshire against incumbent Ray Wieczorek. A bitter campaign ensued, fueled by a long political history. The Republican Wieczorek had been the mayor of Manchester and Buckley had been an Alderman, and the two had fought frequently. Buckley lost the election, but was immediately hired as the Executive Director of the Senate Democratic Caucus. Under his campaign leadership, the Democratic Party gained control of the New Hampshire Senate, a situation that had only occurred for one and a half terms since the nineteenth century.

He is a prominent member of the state Gay Marriage Commission, attempting to reach a bi-partisan agreement on a hot-button issue.

=== State Democratic Party chair ===
Buckley was the frontrunner to become the chair of the New Hampshire Democratic Party in 2007. He temporarily ended his bid for chairman in January of that year, following allegations of possessing child pornography leveled by Buckley's former housemate, Rep. Steve Vaillancourt. Vaillancourt and Buckley had been friends since 1983, and housemates until 1999, when Vaillancourt evicted Buckley for unknown reasons. The relationship has been strained since then. Vaillancourt later admitted he had no proof to back up his allegations.

On January 19, 2007, the Manchester Union Leader reported that the New Hampshire Democratic Party has hired an attorney to investigate a separate set of allegations against Buckley. The investigation was prompted by a letter that accuses Buckley of sexually harassing young male party staffers.

On March 1, 2007, the Attorney General announced that criminal charges would not be filed against Buckley, and he was cleared of all charges of impropriety. The New Hampshire Attorney General considered filing charges against Vaillancourt, but determined instead to let the matter drop for lack of evidence. Buckley promptly resumed his campaign to chair the New Hampshire Democratic Party. Shortly after this, a video surfaced on YouTube, which showed a much younger Buckley using inappropriate language. This video led U.S. House of Representatives member Paul Hodes to withdraw his support of Buckley. Buckley ultimately defeated his challenger, state representative Betty Hall, receiving 109 votes to Hall's 17.

== Personal life ==
Raymond Buckley was born in Keene, New Hampshire in 1959, and is the eldest of nine siblings and half-siblings. His parents moved frequently to find work, and Raymond had attended a different school for each grade through the ninth. His parents divorced in 1972. By high school, his family had settled in Canterbury, where at the age of 14 he served as the town's Democratic Party Chair (due to his youth, his mother held the post officially). He planned to go to college upon graduating high school, but lacking the finances, he accepted a job offer to work for then State Democratic Chair Joanne Symons. He has been a professional politician ever since.

Buckley is openly gay and faced opposition to his sexuality from his first election to the State House in 1986. Before that election, he helped found the New Hampshire Citizens Alliance for Gay and Lesbian Rights. Of his own sexuality, Buckley has said "You cannot make me straight, so get over it."

Political offices
Preceded by Nancy Bridgewater	Member of the New Hampshire House of Representatives from the 44th Hillsborough district 1986–2004	Succeeded by Betsi DeVries
Party political offices
Preceded by Kathy Sullivan	Chair of the New Hampshire Democratic Party; 2007–present	Incumbent
