= Harry Sullivan =

Harry Sullivan may refer to:

- Harry Stack Sullivan (1892–1949), American psychologist and psychoanalyst
- Harry Sullivan (baseball) (1888–1919), American pitcher
- Harry Sullivan (footballer) (1932–2017), Australian rules footballer
- Harry Sullivan (politician) (1921–1977), Australian politician
- Harry Sullivan (Doctor Who), fictional character in the British science-fiction series
- HSTikkyTokky, British YouTuber

== See also ==
- Henry Sullivan (disambiguation)
