= Victoria Sullivan =

American politician (born 1968)

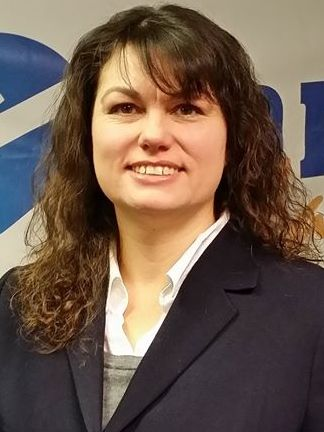
- Sullivan in 2015

Member of the New Hampshire Senate from the 18th district
- Incumbent
- Assumed office December 4, 2024
- Preceded by: Donna Soucy

Member of the New Hampshire House of Representatives from the 16th Hillsborough district
- In office December 3, 2014 – December 5, 2018 Serving with Barbara Shaw
- Preceded by: David McCloskey
- Succeeded by: Joshua Query

Personal details
- Born: June 21, 1968 (age 58)
- Party: Republican
- Spouse: Buddy
- Children: 2
- Website: Campaign website

Victoria L. Sullivan (born June 21, 1968) is an American politician in the state of New Hampshire. She is currently serving in the New Hampshire State Senate, representing the 18th district. Prior to serving in the Senate, she was a member of the New Hampshire House of Representatives, sitting as a Republican from the Hillsborough 16th district, having been first elected in 2014. She lost her reelection bid in 2018 to Democrats Barbara Shaw and Joshua Query.

== Early life ==
Sullivan attended Northern Essex Community College and Medway High School.

== Political career ==
Victoria Sullivan served on the House Education Committee for four years and also served in House leadership as an Assistant Majority Leader.

Sullivan ran for Mayor of Manchester in 2019, losing to incumbent Joyce Craig in the city's non-partisan election, taking 43% of the vote to Craig's 57%. In the 2021 mayoral election, Sullivan made it into the general election after a recount confirmed she came in second. In the general election, Sullivan was beaten by Craig again.

In a special election to fill the remaining term of Manchester Ward 9 Alderman Barbara Shaw held in March 2022, Sullivan lost to former Manchester Fire Chief Jim Burkush.

Sullivan has sponsored a bill that criminalizes female genital mutilation.

She has started and chaired a sober home in Manchester and took a position as director of Freedom Staffing, a non-profit staffing agency that works to remove barriers to employment to those who are re-entering the workforce after being in recovery, homeless, and/or incarcerated. She also serves on the Oversight Commission for Children's Services.

Sullivan was elected to the New Hampshire Senate for the 18th district in 2024, defeating 12 year incumbent and former Senate President Donna Soucy.

New Hampshire House of Representatives
Preceded by David McCloskey	Member of the New Hampshire House of Representatives from the 16th Hillsborough district 2014–2018; Served alongside: Barbara Shaw	Succeeded by Joshua Query
New Hampshire Senate
Preceded by Donna Soucy	Member of the New Hampshire Senate from the 18th district 2024–present	Incumbent
