= Sandra Keans =

American politician

Member of the New Hampshire House of Representatives from the Strafford 23rd district
- In office December 2016 – December 2, 2020
- Preceded by: Don Leeman
- Succeeded by: Fenton Groen

Personal details
- Born: April 9, 1942 (age 84) Rochester, New Hampshire, U.S.
- Party: Democratic
- Education: University of New Hampshire

Sandra Keans (born April 9, 1942) is an American politician in the state of New Hampshire. She is a former member of the New Hampshire House of Representatives, sitting as a Democrat from the Strafford 23 district from 2016 to her defeat in 2020. She previously served from 1980 to 2012.

During her final term as a state representative, from 2019 to 2020, she served as the Vice Chair for the House Judiciary Committee.
