= Janet Kirkland Starr =

American politician

Janet Starr
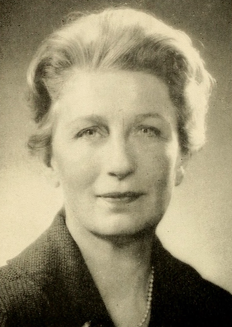

Member of the Massachusetts House of Representatives from the 23rd Middlesex district
- In office 1963–1968

Personal details
- Children: David Starr (politician)

Janet Kirkland Starr was an American Republican politician from Belmont, Massachusetts. She represented the 23rd Middlesex district in the Massachusetts House of Representatives from 1963 to 1968.

She was born in 1917 in New Rochelle, NY to Carol and Bryson Howie and attended Wellesley College, where she earned a degree in philosophy. She married John C. Starr, originally of Montreal.
