= Lillian Soucy =

American politician

Lillian Soucy (née Provost, died 1990) was a member of the New Hampshire House of Representatives. She was the mother of President of the New Hampshire Senate Donna Soucy and was the wife of Manchester alderman C. Arthur Soucy.
