= Senator O'Sullivan =

Senator O'Sullivan may refer to:

- Matt O'Sullivan (born 1978), Australian Senate
- Patrick B. O'Sullivan (1887–1978), Connecticut State Senate
- Thomas C. O'Sullivan (1858–1913), New York State Senate

== See also ==
- Senator Sullivan (disambiguation)
