= Jeff Woodburn =

American politician

Minority Leader of the New Hampshire Senate
- In office December 1, 2014 – August 6, 2018
- Deputy: Donna Soucy
- Preceded by: Sylvia Larsen
- Succeeded by: Donna Soucy (Acting)

Member of the New Hampshire Senate from the 1st district
- In office December 5, 2012 – December 5, 2018
- Preceded by: John Gallus
- Succeeded by: David Starr

Member of the New Hampshire House of Representatives from the 6th Coos district
- In office December 7, 1988 – December 5, 1990
- Preceded by: Thomas Brady
- Succeeded by: Leighton Pratt

Personal details
- Born: June 1965 (age 61)
- Party: Democratic
- Education: Franklin Pierce University (BA)
- Website: Official website

Jeffrey R. Woodburn (born June 1965) from Dalton, New Hampshire is a former Democratic member of the New Hampshire Senate for the 1st district, elected in 2012. He was the minority leader of the Senate Democratic caucus. Woodburn served on the Public and Municipal Affairs Committee and the Election Law and Internal Affairs Committee.

Woodburn graduated in 1987 from Franklin Pierce College, and won a seat in the New Hampshire House of Representatives after graduation. He served one term (1989 to 1991). He previously ran for the State House in 1986, but lost to Harold Burns. He served as Chairman of the New Hampshire Democratic Party (1997 to 1999), and as the executive director for U.S. Representative Richard Swett. Woodburn has also worked as a social studies teacher, freelance writer, real estate businessman, and town moderator. He previously ran for the Executive Council of New Hampshire in 2000, losing to Peter J. Spaulding. He ran for Coos County Commission in 2004, but lost to Thomas M. Brady.

Woodburn was arrested on August 2, 2018, on simple assault, domestic violence, criminal mischief, and criminal trespass charges. Democratic Party Chairman Raymond Buckley called on him to resign. On August 6, Woodburn announced he would resign as the minority leader but would remain as a senator. He won the Democratic primary on September 11, 2018, but was defeated by Republican David Starr in the 2018 general election.

In May 2021, a jury convicted Woodburn of one count of domestic violence, one count of simple assault, and two counts of criminal mischief, but acquitted him of three counts of simple assault, one count of domestic violence, and one count of criminal trespass. He received a sixty-day jail term. However, in March 2023 the New Hampshire Supreme Court overturned Woodburn's convictions and ordered a new trial on the grounds that the trial judge had improperly refused to allow him to raise self-defence. His second trial in 2024 ended in a mistrial. The assault and domestic violence charges were dropped, but Woodburn was retried on the two criminal mischief counts, found guilty, and served 20 days in jail.

== Electoral history ==
New Hampshire's 5th Coos House District election, 1986
Party	Candidate	Votes	%
Republican	Harold Burns	432	51.6
Democratic	Jeff Woodburn	406	48.4

New Hampshire's 6th Coos House District election, 1988
Party	Candidate	Votes	%
Democratic	Jeff Woodburn	2,137	53.3
Republican	Marie R. Bond	1,872	46.7

New Hampshire's 2nd Executive Council District election, 2000
Party	Candidate	Votes	%
Republican	Peter J. Spaulding	58,461	56.5
Democratic	Jeff Woodburn	44,945	43.4

Coos County Commission's 2nd District election, 2004
Party	Candidate	Votes	%
Republican	Thomas M. Brady	3,214	52.5
Democratic	Jeff Woodburn	2,897	47.4

New Hampshire's 1st Senate District election, 2012
Party	Candidate	Votes	%
Democratic	Jeff Woodburn	14,924	59.1
Republican	Debi Warner	10,348	40.9

New Hampshire's 1st Senate District election, 2014
Party	Candidate	Votes	%
Democratic	Jeff Woodburn	10,829	60.2
Republican	Mark Evans	7,166	39.8

New Hampshire's 1st Senate District election, 2016
Party	Candidate	Votes	%
Democratic	Jeff Woodburn	13,926	54.6
Republican	Dolly McPhaul	11,590	45.4

New Hampshire's 1st Senate District election, 2018
Party	Candidate	Votes	%
Republican	David Starr	10,560	54.3
Democratic	Jeff Woodburn (Incumbent)	8,739	44.9

New Hampshire Senate
Preceded by Sylvia Larsen	Minority Leader of the New Hampshire Senate; 2014–2018	Succeeded by Donna Soucy; Acting
