= David Starr (politician) =

American politician

Member of the New Hampshire Senate from the 1st district
- In office December 5, 2018 – December 2, 2020
- Preceded by: Jeff Woodburn
- Succeeded by: Erin Hennessey

Personal details
- Born: June 10, 1943 (age 83)
- Party: Republican
- Parent: Janet Kirkland Starr (mother)
- Education: Franklin & Marshall College (BA); University of Delaware (BS)

David J. Starr (born June 10, 1943) is a former Republican member of the New Hampshire Senate, representing the 1st district, in the northernmost part of the state, from 2018 until 2020. He defeated Democratic incumbent Jeff Woodburn in the 2018 general election after Woodburn was indicted for domestic violence. This was Starr's first race for any elective office. Starr was defeated by State Representative Erin Hennessey in the 2020 Republican primary. He is a resident of Franconia and a retired engineer and Air Force officer.

== Electoral history ==
New Hampshire's 1st Senate District election, 2018
Party	Candidate	Votes	%
Republican	David Starr	10,560	54.3
Democratic	Jeff Woodburn (incumbent)	8,739	44.9
