= George Lambert (American politician) =

American politician

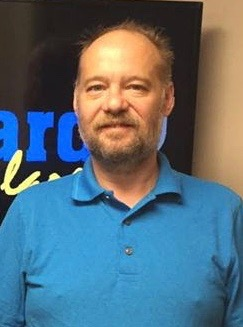

Member of the New Hampshire House of Representatives from the Hillsborough 44th district
- In office December 5, 2012 – December 3, 2014

Member of the New Hampshire House of Representatives from the Hillsborough 27th district
- In office December 2010 – December 5, 2012

Personal details
- Born: September 4, 1968 (age 57) Sanford, Maine, United States
- Party: Republican

George Lambert (born September 4, 1968, Sanford, Maine) is an American politician from the state of New Hampshire. A member of the Republican Party, Lambert served in the New Hampshire House of Representatives.

He is affiliated with the Free State Project.

Lambert unsuccessfully ran for the 18th district of the New Hampshire Senate in the 2014 elections.

He considered running for Governor of New Hampshire in the 2014 election.

Lambert lives in Litchfield, New Hampshire.
