= Betsi DeVries =

American politician

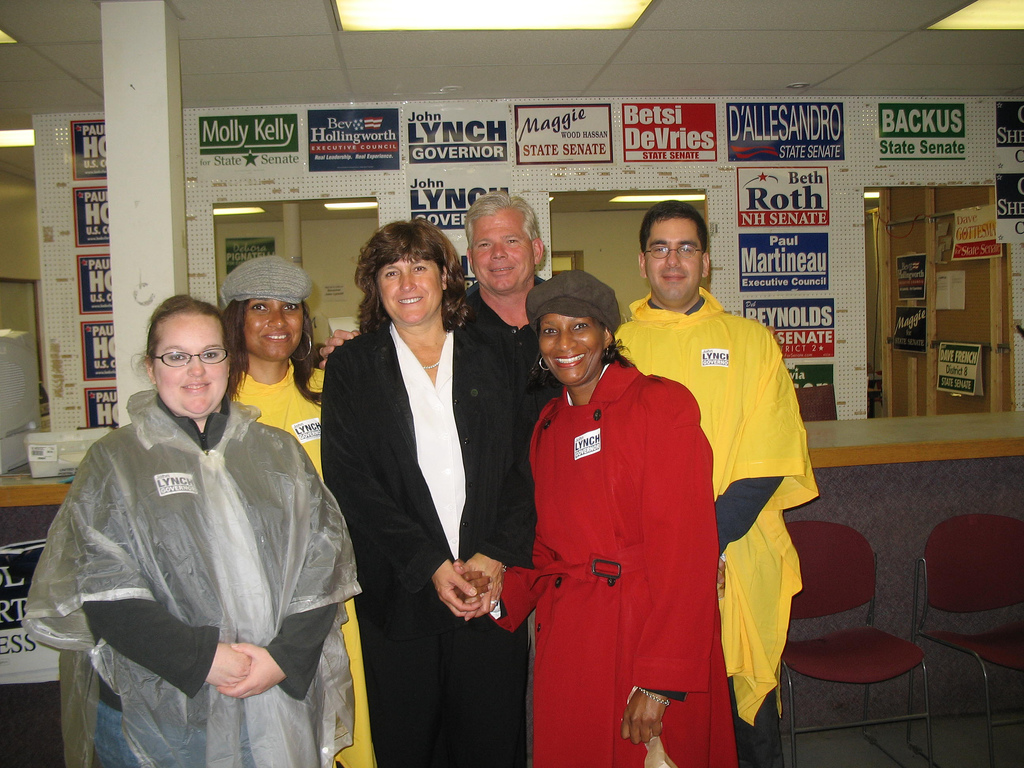
- Betsi DeVries (center)

Member of the New Hampshire Senate from the 18th district
- In office December 2006 – December 2010
- Preceded by: Andre Martel
- Succeeded by: Tom DeBlois

Personal details
- Born: August 12, 1955 (age 70)
- Party: Democratic
- Spouse: Walter Becht
- Profession: Firefighter

Betsi DeVries was a Democratic member of the New Hampshire Senate, representing the 18th district from 2006 until 2010. Previously she was a member of the New Hampshire House of Representatives from 2004 through 2006. She lost her re-election bid in November 2010.

She served as Chair of the New Hampshire Senate Public and Municipal Affairs Committee, is the Vice Chair of the Commerce, Labor and Consumer Protection Committee, and served on the Executive Departments and Administration Committee.

The Senate District 18 comprises: Litchfield and Wards 5, 6, 7, 8 and 9 in the city of Manchester.

In addition to her elected positions Senator DeVries also serves on the board of directors of the Heritage United Way, and the Manchester YWCA. She is past president of the Manchester Area League of Women Voters, a member of the Crystal Lake Preservation Association and a member of the Pine Island Pond Environmental Society.
