= Kelleigh Murphy =

American politician

Member of New Hampshire House of Representatives for Hillsborough 7
- In office 2012–2014

Personal details
- Party: Independent; Republican
- Parent: Jacquelyn Domaingue
- Education: Boston College; University of Richmond School of Law

Kelleigh Domaingue Murphy is an American politician. She represented Hillsborough 7th district at the New Hampshire House of Representatives from 2012 to 2014.

== Biography ==
Her mother Jacquelyn Domaingue was a state representative in the 1980s. She worked on political campaigns including Pat Buchanan and Ovide Lamontagne and was Press Secretary for Bob Smith. She was the owner of the New Hampshire Sports and Social Club. She was elected to the New Hampshire House of Representatives from 2012 and served one term. She was the first female Chairwoman of Bedford Town Council. Outside politics Murphy has worked as a litigation attorney.
