= Jacquelyn Domaingue =

American politician

Member of New Hampshire House of Representatives
- In office 1987–1994
- Constituency: Hillsborough 42 (1987-1992); Hillsborough 44 (1992-1994)

Personal details
- Party: Republican
- Children: Kelleigh Murphy

Jacquelyn M. Domaingue is an American politician. She represented Hillsborough County at the New Hampshire House of Representatives from 1987 to 1994. Her daughter Kelleigh Murphy also served as a state representative.
