= Donna Soucy =

American politician (born 1967)

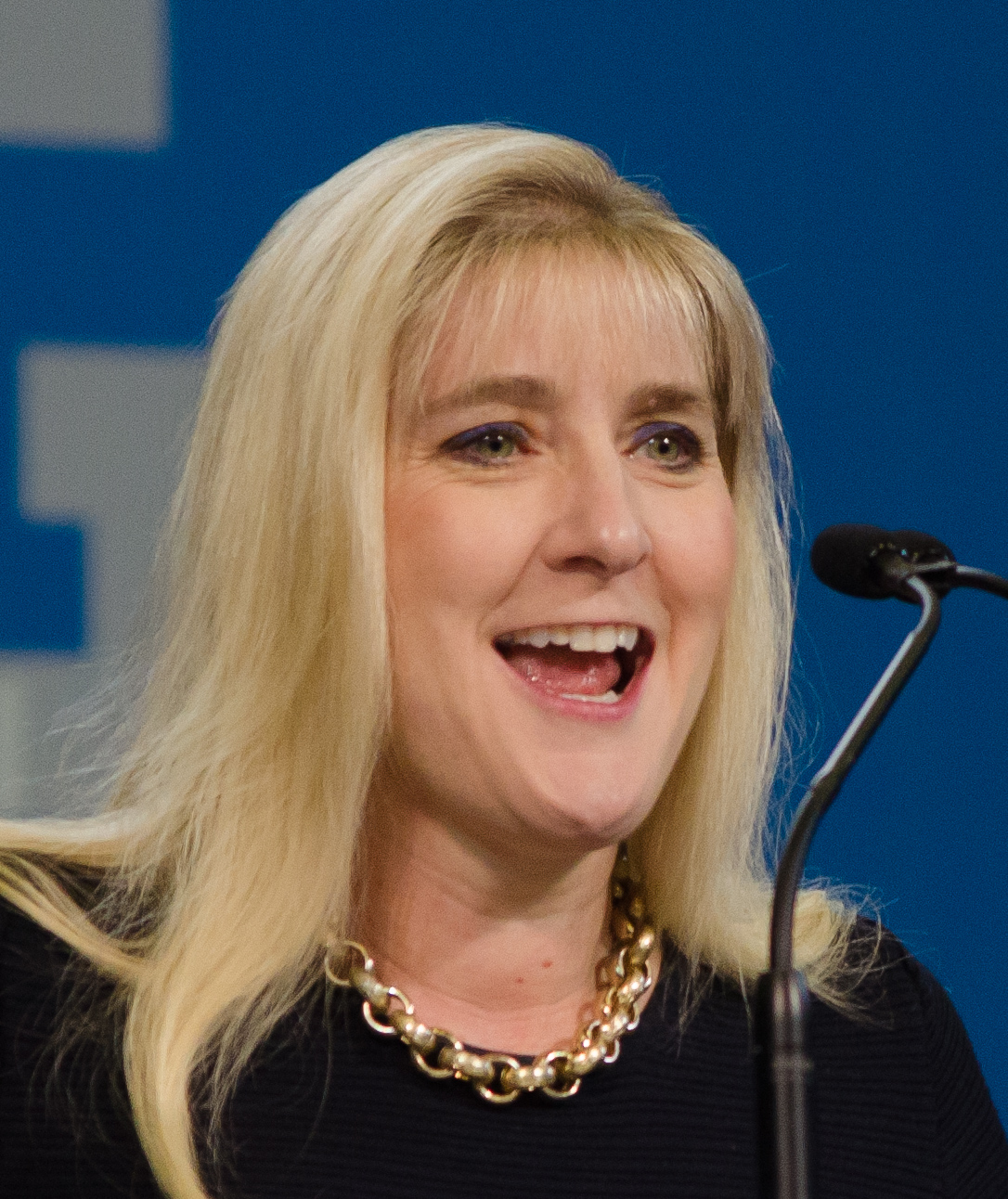

Minority Leader of the New Hampshire Senate
- In office December 2, 2020 – December 4, 2024
- Preceded by: Chuck Morse
- Succeeded by: Rebecca Perkins Kwoka
- In office August 6, 2018 – December 5, 2018; Acting
- Preceded by: Jeff Woodburn
- Succeeded by: Chuck Morse

President of the New Hampshire Senate
- In office December 5, 2018 – December 2, 2020
- Preceded by: Chuck Morse
- Succeeded by: Chuck Morse

Member of the New Hampshire Senate from the 18th district
- In office December 5, 2012 – December 4, 2024
- Preceded by: Tom DeBlois
- Succeeded by: Victoria Sullivan

Member of the New Hampshire House of Representatives from the 42nd Hillsborough district
- In office December 2, 1992 – December 4, 1996
- Preceded by: Jacquelyn Domaingue
- Succeeded by: Robert Murphy

Member of the New Hampshire House of Representatives from the 39th Hillsborough district
- In office December 5, 1990 – December 2, 1992
- Preceded by: Lillian Soucy
- Succeeded by: Joanne O'Rourke

Personal details
- Born: September 7, 1967 (age 59) Manchester, New Hampshire, U.S.
- Party: Democratic
- Relatives: Lillian Soucy (mother)
- Education: St. Anselm College (BA); University of New Hampshire, Concord (JD)
- Website: Campaign website

Donna M. Soucy (born September 7, 1967) is an American attorney and former Democratic member of the New Hampshire Senate, first elected in 2012 in the 18th district. She is previously served as the President of the New Hampshire Senate, from December 5, 2018 until December 2, 2020. Soucy served on the Senate Commerce, and Rules and Enrolled Bills committees, in addition to the Joint Fiscal Committee Soucy has also previously served in the New Hampshire House of Representatives and as a Manchester alderman.

== Early life and education ==
Soucy's mother was Lillian Soucy, a New Hampshire state representative who died in 1990, the year after she graduated from Saint Anselm College in Goffstown, New Hampshire. Her father, C. Arthur Soucy, also served as a Manchester city alderman and as a city official in other capacities, and as a member of the federal Electoral College.

Soucy attended the Franklin Pierce Law Center (now the University of New Hampshire School of Law) and received a Juris Doctor degree.

== Senate career ==
First elected in 2012, Soucy became the minority leader in August 2018, after the incumbent Jeff Woodburn stepped down from his leadership post because he had been arrested on domestic violence charges. Soucy was re-elected to her Senate seat that November, but Woodburn was not, as Democrats won the majority of Senate seats statewide. The 14 Democratic senators-elect chose Soucy as their leader at a caucus shortly after the 2018 mid-term election; she was later unanimously elected Senate President on December 5, 2018. Soucy lost her bid for re-election to a seventh term on November 5, 2024.

== Post-Senate career ==
In April 2026, Soucy co-founded the "New Hampshire Forum" an organization focused on civic engagement and bipartisanship. Soucy serves as the organization's co-chair alongside 2022 U.S. Senate candidate and former Londonderry town manager Kevin H. Smith.

New Hampshire Senate
Preceded by Jeff Woodburn	Minority Leader of the New Hampshire Senate; Acting; 2018	Succeeded by Chuck Morse
Preceded by Chuck Morse	Minority Leader of the New Hampshire Senate; 2020–2024	Succeeded by Rebecca Perkins Kwoka
Political offices
Preceded by Chuck Morse	President of the New Hampshire Senate; 2018–2020	Succeeded by Chuck Morse
