= Chuck Morse =

American politician from New Hampshire

Acting Governor of New Hampshire
- In office January 3, 2017 – January 5, 2017
- Preceded by: Maggie Hassan
- Succeeded by: Chris Sununu

President of the New Hampshire Senate
- In office December 2, 2020 – December 7, 2022
- Preceded by: Donna Soucy
- Succeeded by: Jeb Bradley
- In office September 3, 2013 – December 5, 2018
- Preceded by: Peter Bragdon
- Succeeded by: Donna Soucy

Minority Leader of the New Hampshire Senate
- In office December 5, 2018 – December 2, 2020
- Deputy: Jeb Bradley
- Preceded by: Donna Soucy (acting)
- Succeeded by: Donna Soucy

Member of the New Hampshire Senate from the 22nd district
- In office December 1, 2010 – December 7, 2022
- Preceded by: Michael Downing
- Succeeded by: Daryl Abbas
- In office December 4, 2002 – December 6, 2006
- Preceded by: Arthur Klemm
- Succeeded by: Michael Downing

Member of the New Hampshire House of Representatives from the 28th Rockingham district
- In office December 2, 1998 – December 4, 2002
- Preceded by: Arthur Klemm
- Succeeded by: Constituency abolished

Personal details
- Born: October 11, 1960 (age 65) Salem, New Hampshire, U.S.
- Party: Republican
- Spouse: Susan
- Children: 1
- Education: Plymouth State University (BS)

Charles W. Morse (born October 11, 1960) is an American politician who served as president of the New Hampshire Senate and was acting governor of New Hampshire in 2017. Morse represented New Hampshire's 22nd State Senate district from 2010 to 2022, having previously held the same office from 2002 to 2006.

In 2022, Morse was a Republican candidate for the U.S. Senate in New Hampshire, placing second in the primary behind Donald Bolduc. He also ran for governor in 2024, but lost to former New Hampshire Senator Kelly Ayotte.

== Biography ==
Morse lives with his wife, Susan, and their daughter in Salem, New Hampshire. Morse received his bachelor's degree in business from Plymouth State University. He is the owner of Freshwater Farms, a landscaping business and garden center in southern New Hampshire.

== Political career ==
=== State legislature ===
Morse served in the New Hampshire House of Representatives from 1998 through 2002. He served in the New Hampshire Senate from 2002 through 2006 and led the Senate Finance Committee. He ran for the Executive Council of New Hampshire in 2006, but lost the election to state Senator Beverly Hollingworth. He returned to the New Hampshire Senate in 2010 by being elected in the 22nd district that fall. He was chosen as the president of the Senate, succeeding Peter Bragdon, in 2013. Morse served on the Finance Committee and was responsible for crafting the state budget.

Morse was re-elected to his Senate seat in 2018, but the Republicans were in the minority by a margin of 14–10 in 2019–2020. The ten newly elected Republican members of the state senate chose Morse as their caucus leader shortly after the election. His successor as president was Democratic state senator Donna Soucy.

Morse was re-elected to his Senate seat in 2020 and the Republicans regained the majority by a margin of 14–10. The 14 newly elected Republican members of the state senate chose Morse as their candidate for senate president shortly after the election.

In 2017, Morse served as acting governor of New Hampshire for two days, from when Maggie Hassan resigned as governor in order to join the United States Senate on January 3, 2017, until Chris Sununu's inauguration on January 5. Morse was ceremonially introduced as governor before the legislature and State Senator Sharon Carson briefly assumed the role of Senate President during legislative proceedings. Morse's short stint as governor largely consisted of ceremonial activities in the governor's chamber, including signing proclamations and taking photos with members from his home district.

=== U.S. Senate campaign ===
In 2022, Morse announced he would not seek re-election to the New Hampshire Senate and would instead seek the Republican nomination for United States Senate in the 2022 United States Senate election in New Hampshire. It had been widely anticipated that Morse would seek a full term as Governor of New Hampshire in the 2022 election, however incumbent Republican Chris Sununu opted to seek reelection, causing Morse to shift course toward a U.S. Senate run.

Morse placed second in the primary, narrowly behind Donald Bolduc, and conceded the day after the primary.

Following his defeat, Morse was named New Hampshire state chair of U.S. Term Limits.

=== Gubernatorial campaign ===
After Sununu announced that he would not run for reelection in 2024, Morse announced that he would run for the Republican nomination. He lost the Republican nomination to former US Senator Kelly Ayotte.

== Political positions ==
=== Economic ===
As a state senator, Morse has opposed a broad-based state sales or income tax, has advanced legislation aimed at reducing property taxes, and has focused on eliminating other state taxes, particularly the interest and dividends tax, which the newest state budget will phase out.

=== Immigration ===
As a candidate for U.S. Senate, Morse has highlighted border security as a priority if elected, suggesting current U.S. policy related to border security is responsible for the presence of drugs, including fentanyl, in the state.

=== Abortion ===
Morse helped pass New Hampshire's 24-week late-term abortion ban and has opposed Roe v. Wade, advocating for states to determine abortion laws.

New Hampshire Senate
Preceded by Donna Soucy; Acting	Minority Leader of the New Hampshire Senate; 2018–2020	Succeeded by Donna Soucy
Political offices
Preceded by Peter Bragdon	President of the New Hampshire Senate; 2013–2018	Succeeded by Donna Soucy
Preceded by Maggie Hassan	Governor of New Hampshire; Acting; 2017	Succeeded by Chris Sununu
Preceded by Donna Soucy	President of the New Hampshire Senate; 2020–2022	Succeeded by Jeb Bradley
