= Sam Cataldo =

American politician (1937–2018)

Member of the New Hampshire Senate from the 6th district
- In office December 2012 – December 2016
- Preceded by: Fenton Groen
- Succeeded by: James Gray

Personal details
- Born: July 16, 1937 Lawrence, Massachusetts, U.S.
- Died: February 3, 2018 (aged 80) Farmington, New Hampshire, U.S.
- Party: Republican
- Spouse: Cheryl
- Education: Lowell Technological Institute; Northeastern University

Military service
- Allegiance: United States
- Branch/service: United States Air Force

Sam Cataldo (July 16, 1937 – February 3, 2018) was a Republican member of the New Hampshire Senate, representing the 6th district from 2012 to 2016. His district comprised the towns of Alton, Barnstead, Farmington, Gilmanton, New Durham, and the city of Rochester. He previously served in the New Hampshire House of Representatives for four terms.

== Political career ==
Cataldo served 4 terms in the New Hampshire House of Representatives, before his election to the state senate in 2012.

Cataldo endorsed Jim Gilmore for the 2016 Presidential election. Gilmore also named Cataldo as his campaign's New Hampshire State Chairman.

In 2016, Cataldo ran for the 2nd district of the Executive Council of New Hampshire, but lost to Andru Volinsky.

== Personal life ==
Cataldo was born in Lawrence, Massachusetts and graduated from Central Catholic High School in 1956. In June 1956, he joined the United States Air Force. He had a commercial pilot's license and worked for Avco Corporation. Cataldo and his wife Cheryl had five grown children.

Cataldo died in an automobile crash in Farmington, New Hampshire on February 3, 2018. Sun glare was believed to have played a role in the crash.
