= David Pierce (politician) =

American politician

Member of the New Hampshire Senate from the 5th district
- In office 2012–2016
- Preceded by: Matthew Houde
- Succeeded by: Martha Hennessey

Member of the New Hampshire House of Representatives from the Grafton 9 district
- In office 2006–2012

Personal details
- Party: Democratic

David Pierce was an American politician. He served in the New Hampshire House of Representatives from 2006 to 2012, and in the New Hampshire Senate for the 5th district from 2012 to 2016.

He was the first openly gay person to ever run for and win a seat in the 24-member New Hampshire Senate. Pierce is also widely credited for his speech before the New Hampshire House on the issue of same-sex marriage in New Hampshire, which reportedly swayed several undecided legislators to support the legislation and led to its passage on a narrow vote. He was also known for his advocacy on voting rights in particular and his work on constitutional issues generally. In 2008, Pierce completed Harvard University's John F. Kennedy School of Government program for Senior Executives in State and Local Government as a David Bohnett Foundation LGBTQ Victory Institute Leadership Fellow.
