= New Hampshire's 5th State Senate district =

American legislative district

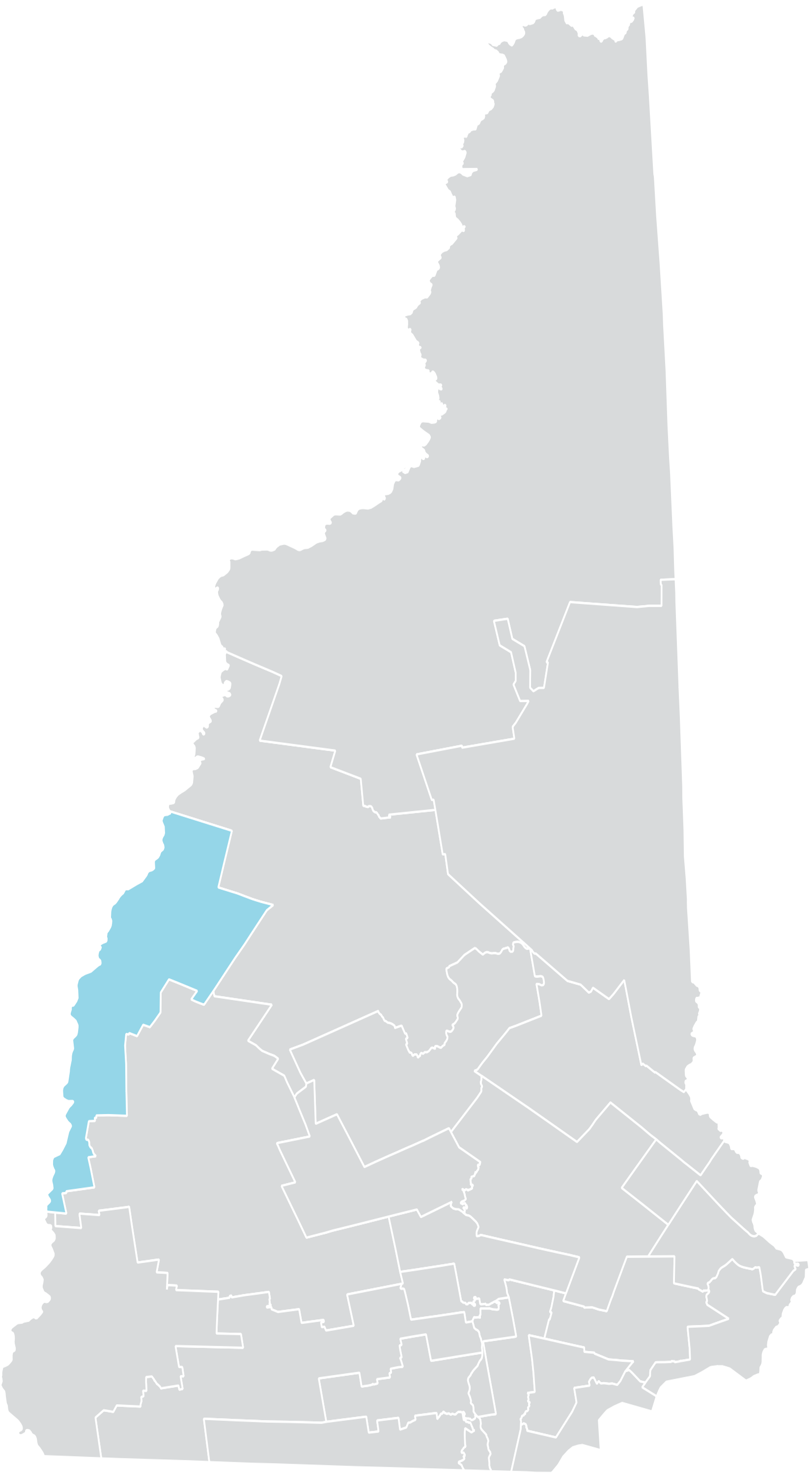
Senator
Suzanne Prentiss; D–Lebanon
- Registration: 44.6% Democratic; 18.7% Republican; 36.5% No party preference
- Demographics: 89.1% White; 1.5% Black; 3.0% Hispanic; 4.5% Asian
- Population (2019) • Citizens of voting age: 57,741; 44,785

New Hampshire's 5th State Senate district is one of 24 districts in the New Hampshire Senate. It has been represented by Democrat Suzanne Prentiss since 2020, succeeding fellow Democrat Martha Hennessey.

== Geography ==
District 5 covers parts of western Grafton, Merrimack, and Sullivan Counties, including the towns of Canaan, Cornish, Dorchester, Enfield, Grantham, Groton, Hanover, Lebanon, Lyme, New London, Orford, Plainfield, Plymouth, Springfield, and Wentworth.

The district is located entirely within New Hampshire's 2nd congressional district. It borders the state of Vermont.

== Recent election results ==
=== 2024 ===
2024 New Hampshire State Senate election, District 5
Party	Candidate	Votes	%
Democratic	Suzanne Prentiss (Incumbent)	23,028	66.21
Republican	John J. McIntyre	11,709	33.67
Write-in		42	0.12
Total votes		34,779	100.0
Democratic hold			

=== 2022 ===
2022 New Hampshire State Senate election, District 5
Party	Candidate	Votes	%
Democratic	Suzanne Prentiss (incumbent)	19,269	69.0
Republican	John McIntyre	8,656	31.0
Total votes		27,925	100.0

=== 2020 ===
2020 New Hampshire State Senate election, District 5
Primary election
Party	Candidate	Votes	%
Democratic	Suzanne Prentiss	4,134	50.4
Democratic	Beatriz Pastor	4,062	49.5
Total votes		8,201	100
General election
Democratic	Suzanne Prentiss	20,418	66.5
Republican	Timothy O'Hearne	10,295	33.5
Total votes		30,713	100
Democratic hold			

=== 2018 ===
2018 New Hampshire State Senate election, District 5
Party	Candidate	Votes	%
Democratic	Martha Hennessey (incumbent)	16,932	71.2
Republican	Patrick Lozito	6,862	28.8
Total votes		23,794	100
Democratic hold			

=== 2016 ===
2016 New Hampshire State Senate election, District 5
Party	Candidate	Votes	%
Democratic	Martha Hennessey	18,809	65.3
Republican	Marie Lobito	9,998	34.7
Total votes		28,807	100
Democratic hold			

=== 2014 ===
2014 New Hampshire State Senate election, District 5
Party	Candidate	Votes	%
Democratic	David Pierce (incumbent)	18,474	100
Total votes		18,474	100
Democratic hold			

=== 2012 ===
2012 New Hampshire State Senate election, District 5
Primary election
Party	Candidate	Votes	%
Democratic	David Pierce	3,092	71.6
Democratic	Sandy Harris	1,224	28.4
Total votes		4,316	100
General election
Democratic	David Pierce	17,719	64.1
Republican	Joe Osgood	9,940	35.9
Total votes		27,659	100
Democratic hold			

=== Federal and statewide results ===
Year	Office	Results
2020	President	Biden 68.1 – 30.3%
2016	President	Clinton 64.6 – 30.9%
2014	Senate	Shaheen 68.4 – 31.6%
2014	Governor	Hassan 67.7 – 32.3%
2012	President	Obama 67.2 – 31.6%
2012	Governor	Hassan 68.4 – 28.3%

== Historical election results ==
These results happened prior to 2012 redistricting, and thus occurred under different district lines.

=== 2010 ===
2010 New Hampshire State Senate election, District 5
Party	Candidate	Votes	%
Democratic	Matthew Houde (incumbent)	11,014	59.6
Republican	James Danforth	7,465	40.4
Total votes		18,479	100
Democratic hold			
