= Barbara Shaw (politician) =

American politician (1942–2021)

Barbara E. Shaw (March 7, 1942 – December 22, 2021) was an American politician from New Hampshire serving as a state representative representing the Hillsborough 16th District from 2000 up until her death in 2021.

== Biography ==
Shaw lived in Manchester, New Hampshire, and was a teacher and an assistant principal. She served in the New Hampshire House of Representatives for 22 years and also on the Manchester Board of Mayor and Aldermen since 2010 for the Democratic Party. She died from complications of surgery on December 22, 2021, at the age of 79.
