= Henry P. Sullivan =

American lawyer and politician

Henry Phillip Sullivan
- Born: August 21, 1916; Manchester, New Hampshire, U.S.
- Died: April 24, 2003 (aged 86); Manchester, New Hampshire, U.S.
- Education: Catholic University of America
- Occupations: Lawyer, politician
- Political party: Democratic Party
- Spouse: Mary McCaffrey
- Children: Kathy Sullivan
- Parent(s): Phillip Sullivan; Johanna Sheehan

Henry Phillip Sullivan (August 21, 1916 – April 24, 2003) was an American lawyer and politician.

== Early life ==
Henry Phillip Sullivan was born on August 21, 1916, in Manchester, New Hampshire. His father was Phillip Sullivan and his mother, Johanna Sheehan.

Sullivan graduated from the Catholic University of America, where he received a Bachelor of Arts degree. He subsequently received a law degree from the Columbus School of Law, CUA's law school.

== Career ==
Sullivan started his career at the Federal Bureau of Investigation (FBI) in law school. He subsequently served in the United States Army Air Forces. In 1946, he was admitted to the New Hampshire Bar, and began a legal practise in Manchester.

Sullivan served as a Democratic member of the New Hampshire House of Representatives and the New Hampshire Senate.

== Personal life ==
Sullivan married Mary McCaffrey. They had a daughter, Kathy Sullivan, a former chairwoman of the New Hampshire Democratic Party.

== Death ==
Sullivan died on April 24, 2003, in Manchester, New Hampshire.
