= New Hampshire's 22nd State Senate district =

American legislative district

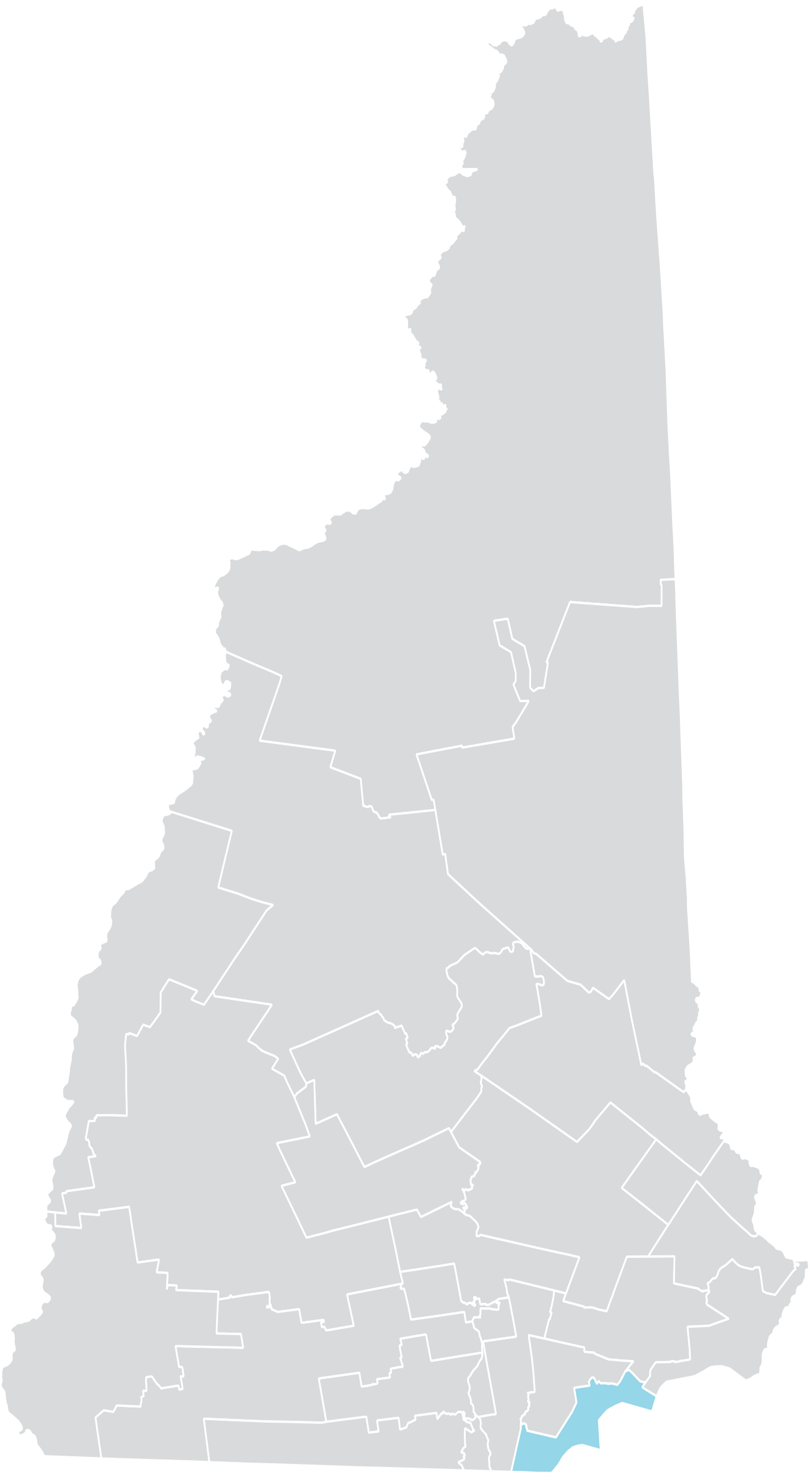
Senator
| Daryl Abbas; R–Salem |
- Registration: 34.6% Republican; 26.7% Democratic; 38.4% No party preference
- Demographics: 88% White; 2% Black; 5% Hispanic; 3% Asian
- Population (2020) • Citizens of voting age: 59,229; 41,575

New Hampshire's 22nd State Senate district is one of 24 districts in the New Hampshire Senate. It has been represented by Republican Daryl Abbas since 2022.

== Geography ==
District 22 spans the state's southern border with Massachusetts in Hillsborough and Rockingham Counties, including the towns of Atkinson, Pelham, Plaistow, and Salem.

The district overlaps with both New Hampshire's 1st congressional district and New Hampshire's 2nd congressional district.

== Recent election results ==
=== 2024 ===
2024 New Hampshire State Senate election, District 22
| Party | Candidate | Votes | % |
|---|---|---|---|
| Republican | Daryl Abbas (Incumbent) | 22,892 | 63.94 |
| Democratic | Wayne Haubner | 12,899 | 36.03 |
| Write-in | | 9 | 0.03 |
| Total votes | | 35,800 | 100.0 |
| Republican hold | | | |

=== 2022 ===
2022 New Hampshire State Senate election, District 22
Primary election
| Party | Candidate | Votes | % |
|---|---|---|---|
| Republican | Daryl Abbas | 4,233 | 55.8 |
| Republican | Peter Torosian | 3,353 | 44.2 |
| Total votes | | 7,586 | 100 |
General election
| Republican | Daryl Abbas | 16,622 | 62.6 |
| Democratic | Wayne Haubner | 9,927 | 37.4 |
| Total votes | | 26,549 | 100 |
| Republican hold | | | |

Elections prior to 2022 were held under different district lines.

== Historical election results ==
=== 2020 ===
2020 New Hampshire State Senate election, District 22
| Party | Candidate | Votes | % |
|---|---|---|---|
| Republican | Chuck Morse (incumbent) | 22,191 | 64.8 |
| Democratic | Thomas Haynes | 12,073 | 35.2 |
| Total votes | | 34,264 | 100 |
| Republican hold | | | |

=== 2018 ===
2018 New Hampshire State Senate election, District 22
| Party | Candidate | Votes | % |
|---|---|---|---|
| Republican | Chuck Morse (incumbent) | 13,571 | 58.6 |
| Democratic | Richard O'Shaughnessy | 9,155 | 39.5 |
| Libertarian | Mitch Dyer | 448 | 1.9 |
| Total votes | | 23,174 | 100 |
| Republican hold | | | |

=== 2016 ===
2016 New Hampshire State Senate election, District 22
| Party | Candidate | Votes | % |
|---|---|---|---|
| Republican | Chuck Morse (incumbent) | 18,717 | 62.4 |
| Democratic | Richard O'Shaughnessy | 11,270 | 37.6 |
| Total votes | | 29,987 | 100 |
| Republican hold | | | |

=== 2014 ===
2014 New Hampshire State Senate election, District 22
| Party | Candidate | Votes | % |
|---|---|---|---|
| Republican | Chuck Morse (incumbent) | 12,928 | 65.6 |
| Democratic | Richard O'Shaughnessy | 6,777 | 34.4 |
| Total votes | | 19,705 | 100 |
| Republican hold | | | |

=== 2012 ===
2012 New Hampshire State Senate election, District 22
| Party | Candidate | Votes | % |
|---|---|---|---|
| Republican | Chuck Morse (incumbent) | 16,972 | 63.4 |
| Democratic | Victoria Czaia | 9,781 | 36.6 |
| Total votes | | 26,753 | 100 |
| Republican hold | | | |

=== Federal and statewide results ===
| Year | Office | Results |
|---|---|---|
| 2020 | President | Trump 56.4 – 42.3% |
| 2020 | Senate | Messner 50.1 – 47.9% |
| 2016 | President | Trump 58.7 – 37.3% |
| 2016 | Senate | Ayotte 55.6 - 39.4% |
| 2014 | Senate | Brown 62.5 – 37.5% |
| 2014 | Governor | Havenstein 57.2 – 42.8% |
| 2012 | President | Romney 58.4 – 40.7% |
| 2012 | Governor | Lamontagne 52.7 – 43.8% |
