= New Hampshire's 1st State Senate district =

American legislative district

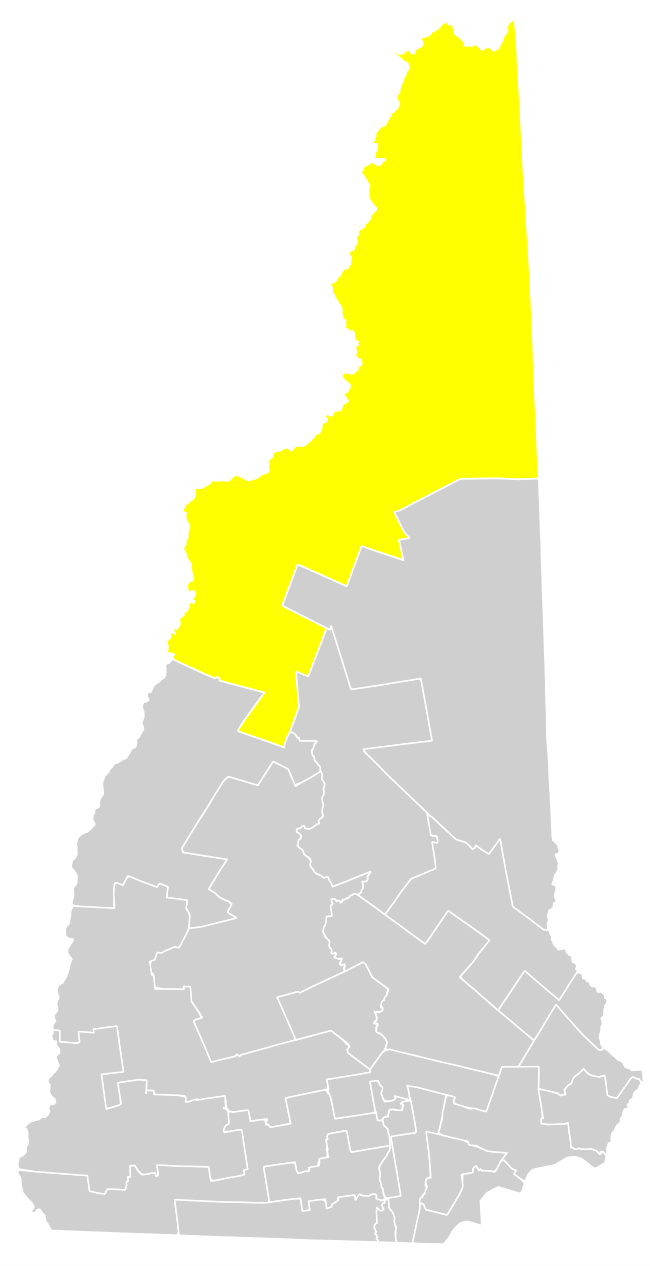
Senator
David Rochefort; R–Littleton
- Registration: 28.6% Republican; 27.5% Democratic; 44.0% No party preference
- Demographics: 92% White; 2% Black; 2% Hispanic; 1% Asian; 2% Native American
- Population (2020): 55,947

New Hampshire's 1st State Senate district is one of 24 districts in the New Hampshire Senate. It has been represented by Republican David Rochefort since 2024.

== Geography ==
District 1 covers far northern New Hampshire, including the Great North Woods region bordering Canada. It is located entirely within New Hampshire's 2nd congressional district. It borders the states of Maine and Vermont, as well as the Canadian province of Quebec. At over 2,500 square miles, it is the largest state legislative district in New Hampshire.

Coös County - 100% of county

Grafton County - 27% of county

- Littleton
- Bethlehem
- Franconia
- Sugar Hill
- Lisbon
- Lyman
- Monroe
- Bath
- Landaff
- Easton
- Haverhill
- Benton
- Woodstock
- Ellsworth
- Warren
- Piermont
- Rumney

== Recent election results ==
=== 2024 ===
2024 New Hampshire State Senate election, District 1
Party	Candidate	Votes	%
Republican	David Rochefort	17,613	56.82
Democratic	Rusty Talbot	13,371	43.14
Write-in		12	0.04
Total votes		30,996	100.0
Republican hold			

=== 2022 ===
2022 New Hampshire State Senate election, District 1
Party	Candidate	Votes	%
Republican	Carrie Gendreau	13,112	54.7
Democratic	Edith Tucker	10,885	45.3
Total votes		23,967	100
Republican hold			

Elections prior to 2022 were held under different district lines.

=== Federal and statewide results ===
Results are of elections held under 2022 district lines.

Year	Office	Results
2022	Senate	Hassan 52.0 – 47.9%
2022	Governor	Sununu

== Historical election results ==
=== 2020 ===
2020 New Hampshire State Senate election, District 1
Primary election
Party	Candidate	Votes	%
Republican	Erin Hennessey	3,620	69.6
Republican	David Starr (incumbent)	1,571	30.2
Total votes		5,200	100
General election
Republican	Erin Hennessey	15,756	57.3
Democratic	Susan Ford	11,741	42.7
Total votes		27,497	100
Republican hold			

=== 2018 ===
2018 New Hampshire State Senate election, District 1
Party	Candidate	Votes	%
Republican	David Starr	10,560	54.3
Democratic	Jeff Woodburn (incumbent)	8,739	44.9
Total votes		19,447	100
Republican gain from Democratic			

=== 2016 ===
2016 New Hampshire State Senate election, District 1
Primary election
Party	Candidate	Votes	%
Republican	Dolly McPhaul	2,274	51.6
Republican	Leon Rideout	2,130	48.4
Total votes		4,404	100
General election
Democratic	Jeff Woodburn (incumbent)	13,926	54.6
Republican	Dolly McPhaul	11,590	45.4
Total votes		25,516	100
Democratic hold			

=== 2014 ===
2014 New Hampshire State Senate election, District 1
Party	Candidate	Votes	%
Democratic	Jeff Woodburn (incumbent)	10,829	60.2
Republican	Mark Evans	7,166	39.8
Total votes		17,995	100
Democratic hold			

=== 2012 ===
2012 New Hampshire State Senate election, District 1
Primary election
Party	Candidate	Votes	%
Republican	Debi Warner	2,691	62.2
Republican	Frank Dumaine	1,632	37.8
Total votes		4,323	100
General election
Democratic	Jeff Woodburn	14,924	59.1
Republican	Debi Warner	10,348	40.9
Total votes		25,272	100
Democratic hold			
