= New Hampshire's 6th State Senate district =

American legislative district

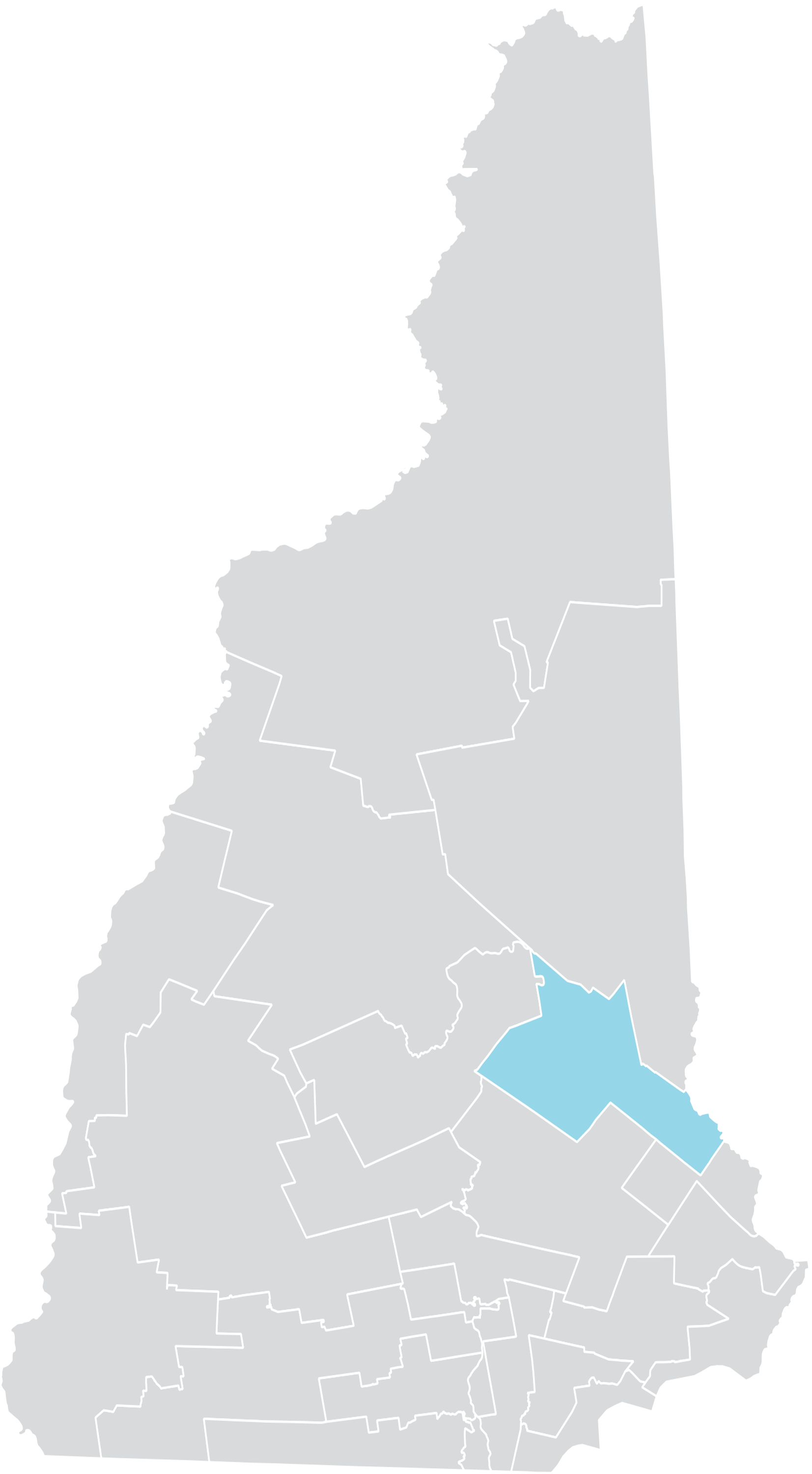
Senator
James Gray; R–Rochester
- Registration: 33.1% Republican; 25.3% Democratic; 41.6% No party preference
- Demographics: 93.6% White; 0.4% Black; 2.2% Hispanic; 1.4% Asian
- Population (2019) • Citizens of voting age: 54,303; 41,920

New Hampshire's 6th State Senate district is one of 24 districts in the New Hampshire Senate. It has been represented by Republican James Gray since 2016, succeeding fellow Republican Sam Cataldo.

== Geography ==
District 6 covers parts of Belknap and Strafford Counties, including the towns of Alton, Farmington, Gilmanton, New Durham, Rochester and Strafford.

The district is located entirely within New Hampshire's 1st congressional district. It borders the state of Maine.

== Recent election results ==
=== 2024 ===
2024 New Hampshire State Senate election, District 6
Party	Candidate	Votes	%
Republican	James P. Gray (Incumbent)	18,561	59.77
Democratic	John Ceskavich	12,483	40.19
Write-in		13	0.04
Total votes		31,057	100.0
Republican hold			

=== 2022 ===
2022 New Hampshire State Senate election, District 6
Party	Candidate	Votes	%
Republican	James Gray (incumbent)	13,167	55.79
Democratic	Ruth Larson	10,434	44.21
Total votes		23,601	100.0

=== 2020 ===
2020 New Hampshire State Senate election, District 6
Party	Candidate	Votes	%
Republican	James Gray (incumbent)	17,290	57.8
Democratic	Christopher Rice	12,638	42.2
Total votes		29,928	100
Republican hold			

=== 2018 ===
2018 New Hampshire State Senate election, District 6
Party	Candidate	Votes	%
Republican	James Gray (incumbent)	11,602	54.9
Democratic	Anne Grassie	9,537	45.1
Total votes		21,139	100
Republican hold			

=== 2016 ===
2016 New Hampshire State Senate election, District 6
Party	Candidate	Votes	%
Republican	James Gray	14,481	55.1
Democratic	Joe Casey	11,793	44.9
Total votes		26,274	100
Republican hold			

=== 2014 ===
2014 New Hampshire State Senate election, District 6
Party	Candidate	Votes	%
Republican	Sam Cataldo (incumbent)	9,882	56.4
Democratic	Richard Leonard	7,640	43.6
Total votes		17,522	100
Republican hold			

=== 2012 ===
2012 New Hampshire State Senate election, District 6
Primary election
Party	Candidate	Votes	%
Republican	Sam Cataldo	2,358	52.3
Republican	Richard Green	2,153	47.7
Total votes		4,511	100
General election
Republican	Sam Cataldo	12,764	51.3
Democratic	Richard Leonard	12,127	48.7
Total votes		24,891	100
Republican hold			

=== Federal and statewide results ===
Year	Office	Results
2020	President	Trump 54.1 – 44.0%
2016	President	Trump 55.7 – 38.7%
2014	Senate	Brown 52.3 – 47.7%
2014	Governor	Havenstein 52.7 – 47.3%
2012	President	Romney 50.6 – 48.3%
2012	Governor	Hassan 51.7 – 45.5%
