= New Hampshire's 18th State Senate district =

American legislative district

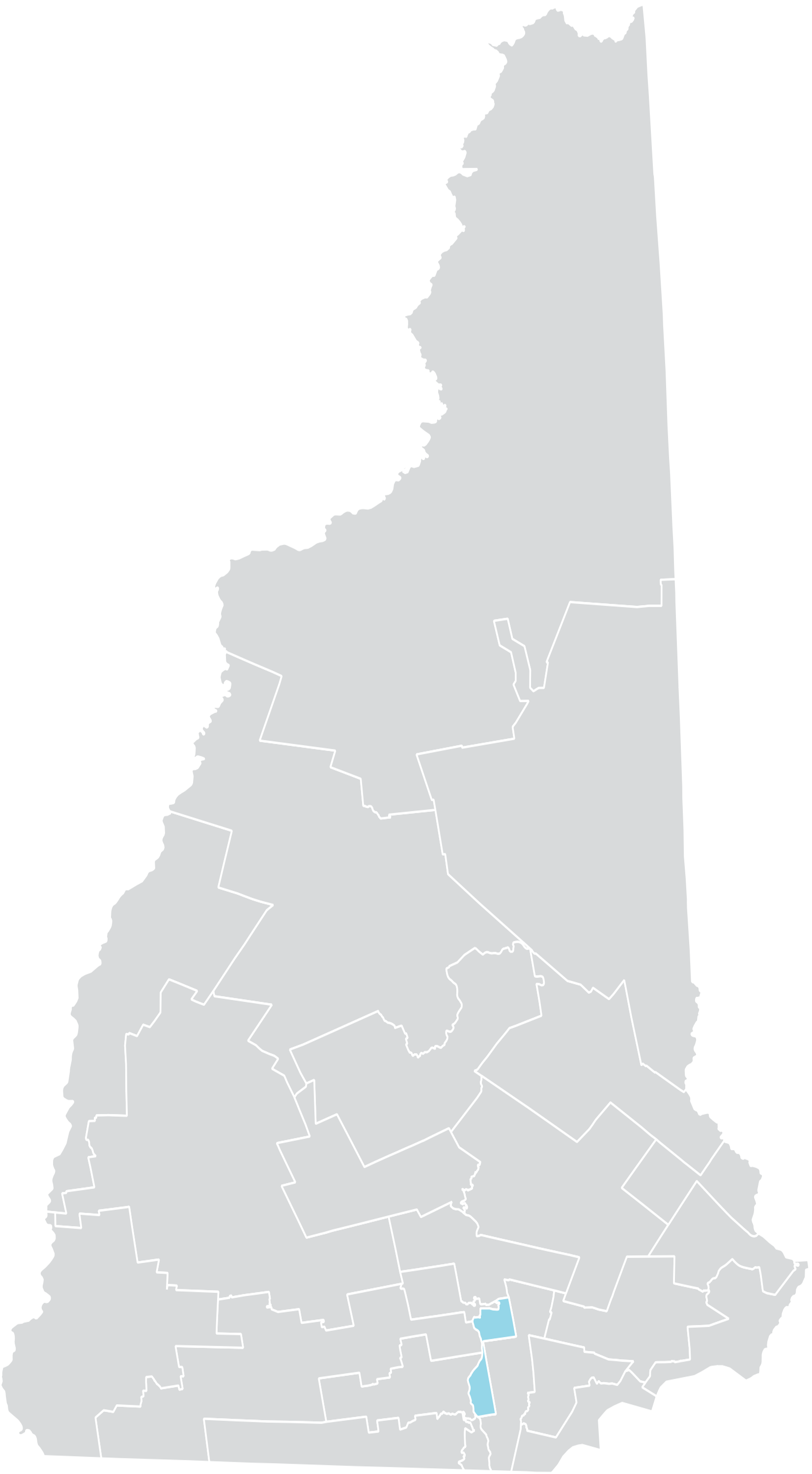
Senator
Victoria Sullivan; R–Manchester
- Registration: 30.2% Democratic; 29.8% Republican; 40.0% No party preference
- Demographics: 78.7% White; 3.7% Black; 9.5% Hispanic; 5.4% Asian
- Population (2019) • Citizens of voting age: 54,993; 40,578

New Hampshire's 18th State Senate district is one of 24 districts in the New Hampshire Senate. It was represented by Democrat Donna Soucy, formerly the President of the New Hampshire Senate, from 2012 to 2024. Former NH State Representative, Republican Victoria Sullivan, defeated her on November 5, 2024. Victoria Sullivan was sworn in to represent NH Senate District 18 on December 4, 2024.

== Geography ==
District 18 is based in Manchester, covering the city's 5th, 6th, 7th, 8th, and 9th wards as well as the nearby town of Litchfield, all in Hillsborough County.

The district overlaps with both New Hampshire's 1st congressional district and New Hampshire's 2nd congressional district.

== Recent election results ==
=== 2024 ===
2024 New Hampshire State Senate election, District 18
Party	Candidate	Votes	%
Republican	Victoria Sullivan	13,289	51.42
Democratic	Donna Soucy (Incumbent)	12,541	48.52
Write-in		16	0.06
Total votes		25,848	100.0
Republican gain from Democratic			

=== 2022 ===
2022 New Hampshire State Senate election, District 18
Party	Candidate	Votes	%
Democratic	Donna Soucy (incumbent)	9,920	52.4
Republican	George Lambert	9,015	47.6
Total votes		18,961	100.0

=== 2020 ===
2020 New Hampshire State Senate election, District 18
Primary election
Party	Candidate	Votes	%
Republican	George Lambert	2,219	55.1
Republican	Ross Terrio	1,790	44.4
Total votes		4,030	100
General election
Democratic	Donna Soucy (incumbent)	14,105	55.4
Republican	George Lambert	11,355	44.6
Total votes		25,460	100
Democratic hold			

=== 2018 ===
2018 New Hampshire State Senate election, District 18
Party	Candidate	Votes	%
Democratic	Donna Soucy (incumbent)	10,276	56.0
Republican	George Lambert	8,066	44.0
Total votes		18,342	100
Democratic hold			

=== 2016 ===
2016 New Hampshire State Senate election, District 18
Primary election
Party	Candidate	Votes	%
Republican	Ross Terrio	1,253	36.7
Republican	George Lambert	1,242	36.3
Republican	Ralph Boehm	924	27.0
Total votes		3,419	100
General election
Democratic	Donna Soucy (incumbent)	13,299	55.0
Republican	Ross Terrio	10,869	45.0
Total votes		24,168	100
Democratic hold			

=== 2014 ===
2014 New Hampshire State Senate election, District 18
Primary election
Party	Candidate	Votes	%
Republican	George Lambert	1,780	56.2
Republican	Robyn Dunphy	1,386	43.8
Total votes		3,166	100
General election
Democratic	Donna Soucy (incumbent)	8,266	53.2
Republican	George Lambert	7,268	46.8
Total votes		15,534	100
Democratic hold			

=== 2012 ===
2012 New Hampshire State Senate election, District 18
Party	Candidate	Votes	%
Democratic	Donna Soucy	12,139	51.6
Republican	J. Gail Barry	8,024	34.1
Independent	Arthur Beaudry	3,378	14.3
Total votes		23,541	100
Democratic gain from Republican			

=== Federal and statewide results ===
Year	Office	Results
2020	President	Biden 51.5 – 46.6%
2020	Senate	Shaheen 56.3 – 41.0%
2016	President	Trump 48.9 – 46.1%
2014	Senate	Shaheen 50.9 – 49.1%
2014	Governor	Hassan 51.5 – 48.5%
2012	President	Obama 51.2 – 47.5%
2012	Governor	Hassan 52.0 – 45.1%
