= Maggie Hassan =

American politician (born 1958)

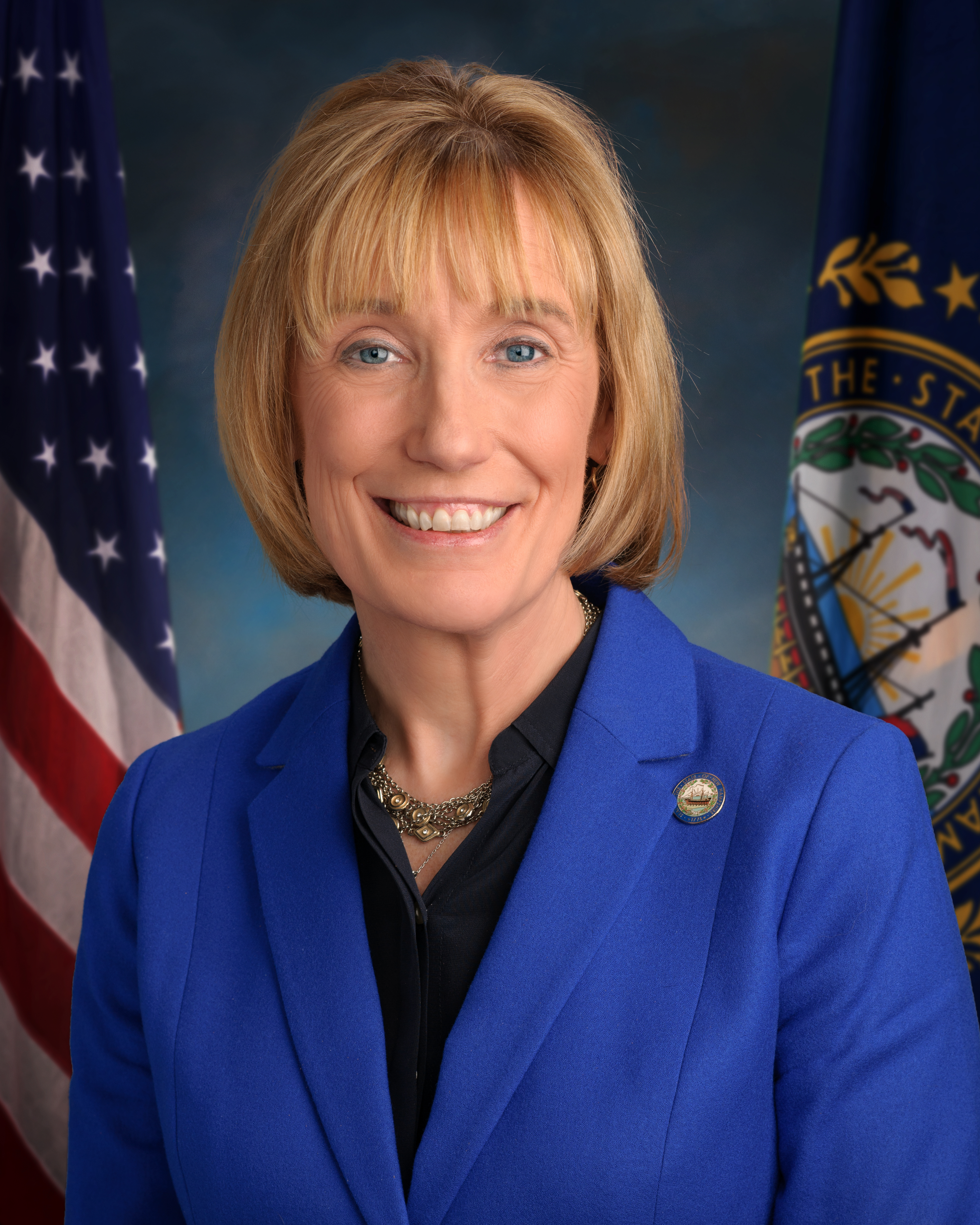
- Official portrait, 2016

Ranking Member of the Joint Economic Committee
- Incumbent
- Assumed office January 3, 2025
- Preceded by: David Schweikert

United States Senator from New Hampshire
- Incumbent
- Assumed office January 3, 2017 Serving with Jeanne Shaheen
- Preceded by: Kelly Ayotte

81st Governor of New Hampshire
- In office January 3, 2013 – January 2, 2017
- Preceded by: John Lynch
- Succeeded by: Chuck Morse (acting)

Majority Leader of the New Hampshire Senate
- In office January 3, 2008 – December 1, 2010
- Preceded by: Joseph Foster
- Succeeded by: Jeb Bradley

Member of the New Hampshire Senate from the 23rd district
- In office December 1, 2004 – December 1, 2010
- Preceded by: Russell Prescott
- Succeeded by: Russell Prescott

Personal details
- Born: Margaret Coldwell Wood; February 27, 1958 (age 68) Boston, Massachusetts, U.S.
- Party: Democratic
- Spouse: Thomas Hassan (m. 1983)
- Children: 2
- Relatives: Robert Coldwell Wood (father); Frank Wood (brother)
- Education: Brown University (BA); Northeastern University (JD)
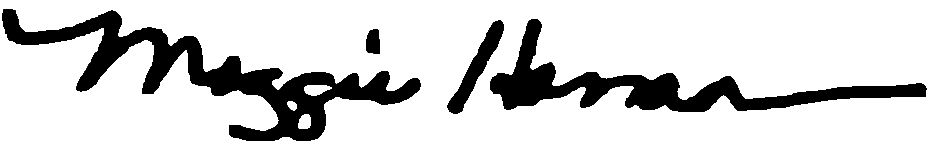
- Signature
- Website: Senate website Campaign website
- Hassan's voice Hassan questions witnesses on Career Pathway Programs; Recorded May 15, 2022

Margaret Coldwell Hassan (/ˈhæsən/ HASS-ən; née Wood; born February 27, 1958) is an American politician and attorney serving as the junior United States senator for New Hampshire since 2017. A member of the Democratic Party, Hassan was the 81st governor of New Hampshire, from 2013 to 2017.

Born in Boston, Hassan graduated from Brown University and earned a J.D. from the Northeastern University School of Law. After graduating from law school in 1985, she worked at the law firm Palmer & Dodge. She later worked as associate general counsel for Brigham and Women’s Hospital.

Hassan first ran for the New Hampshire Senate in 2002, losing to incumbent Russell Prescott. She ran again in 2004 and won. She served in the New Hampshire Senate from 2005 to 2010. She became the state senate majority leader in 2008 before losing reelection in a 2010 rematch with Prescott.

Hassan ran for governor in 2012, defeating former state senator Jacalyn Cilley in the Democratic primary and Republican nominee Ovide M. Lamontagne in the general election. She was reelected in 2014. After becoming governor, Hassan was elected vice chair of the Democratic Governors Association and served as a superdelegate at the 2016 Democratic National Convention.

In 2016, Hassan ran for the U.S. Senate and narrowly defeated Kelly Ayotte, the Republican incumbent, by about 1,000 votes, or 0.1%. She was reelected in 2022. She serves with Jeanne Shaheen, another former governor. Hassan is expected to become New Hampshire's senior senator and the dean of the state's congressional delegation upon Shaheen's retirement in 2027.

== Early life and education ==
Margaret Wood was born in Boston on February 27, 1958, and grew up in the Boston suburb of Lincoln, where she sang in school choirs and at church. Her parents were both involved in politics. Her father, Robert Coldwell Wood, was a political science professor who served as president of the University of Massachusetts and helped found the United States Department of Housing and Urban Development, later serving as the department's secretary. Her mother was a teacher, and the head of their local chapter of the League of Women Voters. She described family dinners as discussions where her father in turn asked everyone at the table, including her and any guests, to comment. She has two siblings, including Tony Award-winning actor Frank Wood.

Hassan attended Lincoln-Sudbury Regional High School in Sudbury, Massachusetts, graduating in 1976. She spent a short time working on an assembly line making boxes while she was in high school, which she later described as the worst job she ever had. In 1980, she graduated from Brown University with a bachelor's degree. She worked as an information officer with the Massachusetts Department of Social Services from 1980 to 1982. From 1985 to 1992, she worked at the Boston law firm Palmer & Dodge. She graduated from Northeastern University School of Law in 1985 with a juris doctor and worked as an attorney from 1985 to 1992. She worked as assistant general counsel at Brigham and Women's Hospital from 1993 to 1996. She then returned to work as an attorney from 1996 to 2009.

Hassan became a disability rights activist when her son with cerebral palsy began school and she sought accommodations for him. This led Governor Jeanne Shaheen to appoint Hassan citizen advisor for the Adequacy in Education and Finance Commission in 1999.

== New Hampshire Senate ==
Hassan in 2008

Hassan ran for the New Hampshire Senate in the 2002 election. She ran on the encouragement of her husband, despite her belief that her job and family meant she would not have time to hold political office. She lost to incumbent Republican Russell Prescott, with 46% of the vote to Prescott's 54%. They faced each other again in 2004, where she defeated Prescott with 52% of the vote to Prescott's 48%. She was reelected against Natalie Healy in 2006, 60% to 40%. She defeated Lee Quandt in 2008, 57% to 43%. Hassan supported Hillary Clinton in the 2008 Democratic Party presidential primaries.

Hassan held leadership positions in the New Hampshire Senate, including assistant Democratic whip and president pro tempore. She also chaired the Capital Budget and Public Municipal Affairs Committees. In 2008, Senate President Sylvia Larsen chose Hassan to serve as Senate Majority Leader, the number two position in the New Hampshire Senate. Larsen said she chose Hassan because she wanted someone who would fight to get the Democratic caucus to support the same agenda and take a partisan position, allowing Larsen to take a conciliatory position. Hassan had a reputation for taking aggressive stances, which she later said taught her the importance of bipartisanship. She was majority leader from 2008 to 2010.

In 2010, Hassan proposed a healthcare regulation system called "Maggie Care" by her opponents in reference to the Affordable Care Act's nickname "Obamacare". Her proposed commission was created, but she was unable to grant it the power to limit rates. Her healthcare bill was unpopular and never reached a vote in the state legislature.

Hassan's budget for the fiscal years 2010–2011 included a tax limited liability companies that had previously paid lower taxes. The measure was controversial because it raised taxes on small businesses and was enacted without a public hearing, and she was involved in its repeal the following year.

Hassan served in the New Hampshire Senate for six years before losing in a rematch with Russell Prescott in the 2010 election, getting 47% of the vote to Prescott's 53%. This was one of many losses for Democrats across the country in a year when Republicans performed exceptionally well.

=== New Hampshire Senate committee assignments ===
- Capital Budget Committee
- Commerce, Labor and Consumer Protection
- Finance
- Public and Municipal Affairs (Chair)
- Energy, Environment, and Economic Development (Vice Chair)
- Internal Affairs Committee
- Executive Department and Administration Committee

=== New Hampshire Senate caucus membership ===
- Congressional Coalition on Adoption

== Governor of New Hampshire ==
=== 2012 election ===
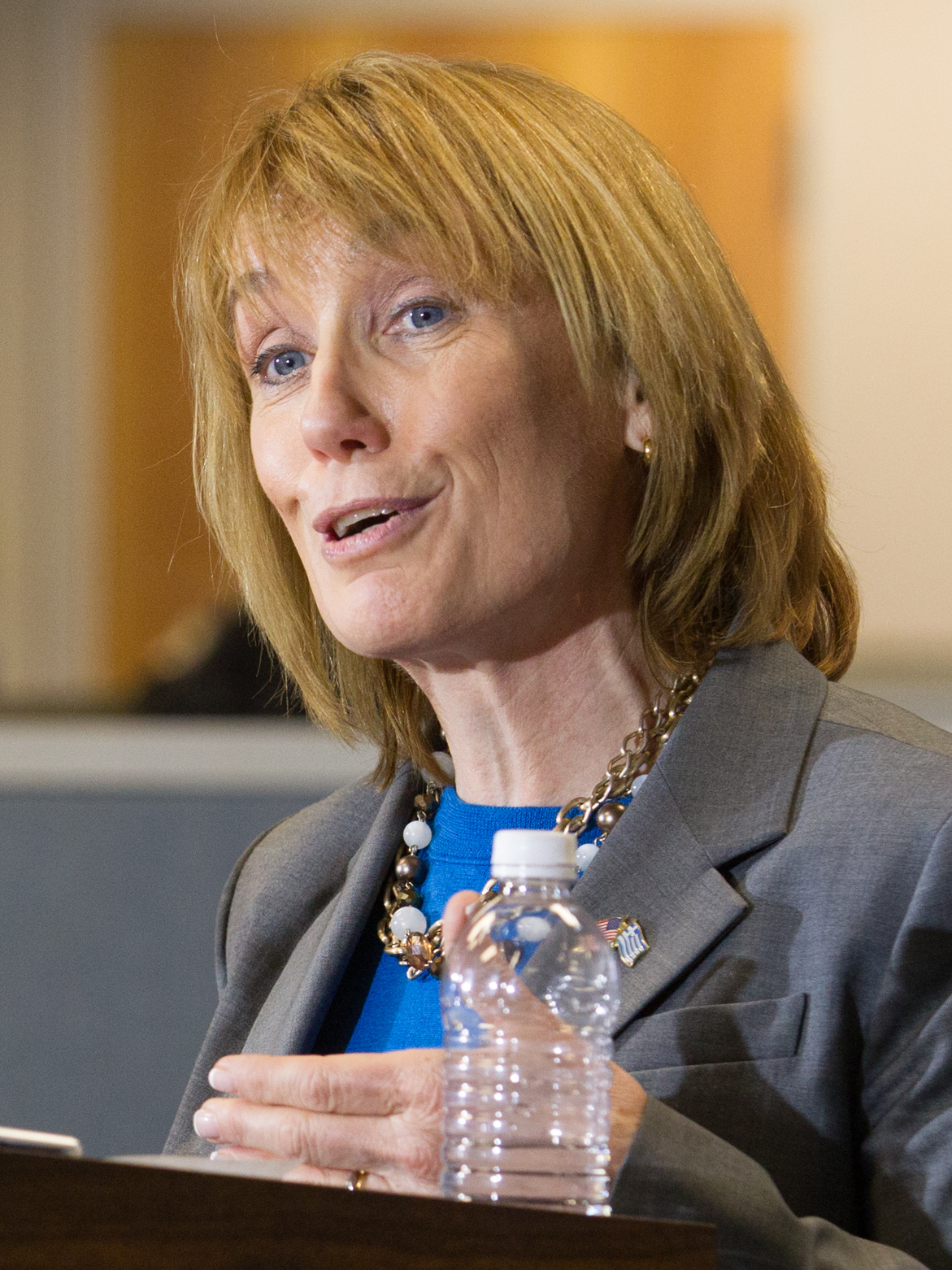
Hassan in 2014

Hassan announced her candidacy for governor of New Hampshire in October 2011, one month after incumbent governor John Lynch announced his retirement. She was the first Democrat to enter the gubernatorial race, and she was endorsed by former president Bill Clinton during the Democratic primary election. She won the primary election with 54% of the vote, defeating state senator Jackie Cilley and firefighter Bill Kennedy. Hassan was the only woman to be a major party's candidate for governor in 2012.

Hassan faced Republican nominee Ovide Lamontagne in the general election, campaigning on the economy and higher education. On the economy, she took a fiscally conservative stance and opposed creating a state income tax. She described her opponent as a Tea Party candidate, while he criticized her for advocating high taxes and spending, and for her lack of business experience. Financial support for her campaign came from the Democratic Governors Association, the Service Employees International Union, the American Federation of State, County and Municipal Employees, and the National Education Association.

The Democratic Party performed well in New Hampshire's 2012 elections, and Hassan won with 55% of the vote to Lamontagne's 43%. She carried every county in the state. Her election made New Hampshire the first state whose governor and entire Congressional delegation were women.

=== First term as governor (2013–2015) ===
Hassan was sworn in as governor on January 3, 2013. She took office with a legislature split between Democrats and Republicans, and advocated bipartisanship. Hassan did not live in the Governor's Mansion but in a colonial house on the campus of the school of which her husband was principal; the last governor to live in the Governor's Mansion was Meldrim Thomson in the 1970s. The Democratic Governors Association selected Hassan as its vice chair in 2013.

Hassan's major initiatives as governor involved funding for higher education, expanding mental health services, and support for gambling. She passed a Medicaid expansion in 2014. Hassan allowed Republicans in the legislature to create the budget during her first term, leading critics to accuse her of being too uninvolved in the budget process. The state had budget surpluses during her first term.

=== 2014 election ===
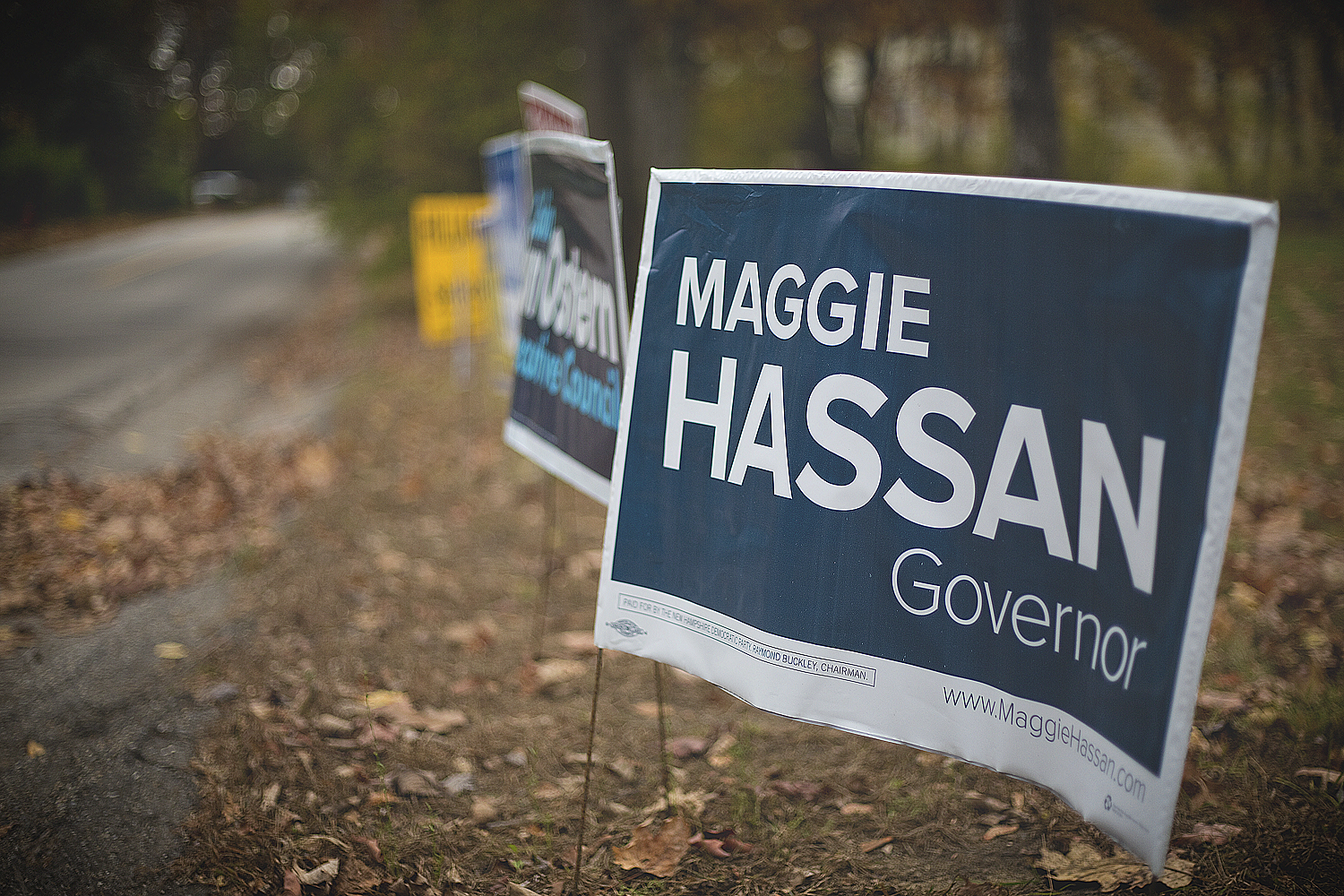
A campaign sign for Hassan in 2014.

Hassan ran for reelection in 2014. She won the Democratic primary with 94% of the vote and faced businessman Walt Havenstein in the general election. Havenstein campaigned on corporate tax cuts, opposition to gambling, and support for right-to-work laws. Hassan was reelected with 53% of the vote to Havenstein's 47%. Her victory was a win for Democrats in a year when they otherwise performed poorly.

=== Second term as governor (2015–2017) ===
The Republican Party controlled both chambers of New Hampshire's legislature during Hassan's second term, challenging her ability to enact her policies. The opioid epidemic remained a major issue, and opponents accused her of taking insufficient action. She responded by saying the state needed more federal assistance to address the issue. She appointed Jack Wozmak to be the state's drug czar in early 2015, but he resigned a year later in response to complaints about his job performance.

Other initiatives during Hassan's second term included protection for Planned Parenthood funding, bonds to fund the redevelopment of The Balsams Grand Resort Hotel, and a renewed fight with Republicans to extend New Hampshire's Medicaid expansion. In 2015, Hassan took the rare step of vetoing a budget created by the state legislature. She cited its tax cuts for businesses, its lack of negotiated raises for state employees, and its exclusion of Medicaid expansion. She proposed a budget that increased funding for healthcare and higher education by raising taxes on businesses, motor vehicle registration, and sale of tobacco, as well as legalizing Keno in restaurants and bars.

Hassan endorsed Hillary Clinton in the 2016 Democratic Party presidential primaries. She was scrutinized for evading a question about whether Clinton was "honest and trustworthy", only later clarifying that she did consider Clinton honest and trustworthy. Hassan was one of several politicians nationally who agreed to return campaign donations from partners of the Thornton Law Firm in 2016 after the firm was accused of reimbursing partners for their donations. Her approval rating was boosted by low unemployment during her tenure.

Hassan resigned as governor on January 2, 2017, three days before the end of her term, so she could be sworn in to the Senate with the rest of the incoming freshmen senators on January 3 and avoid forfeiting her seniority. Senate President Chuck Morse became acting governor.

== U.S. Senate ==
=== 2016 election ===
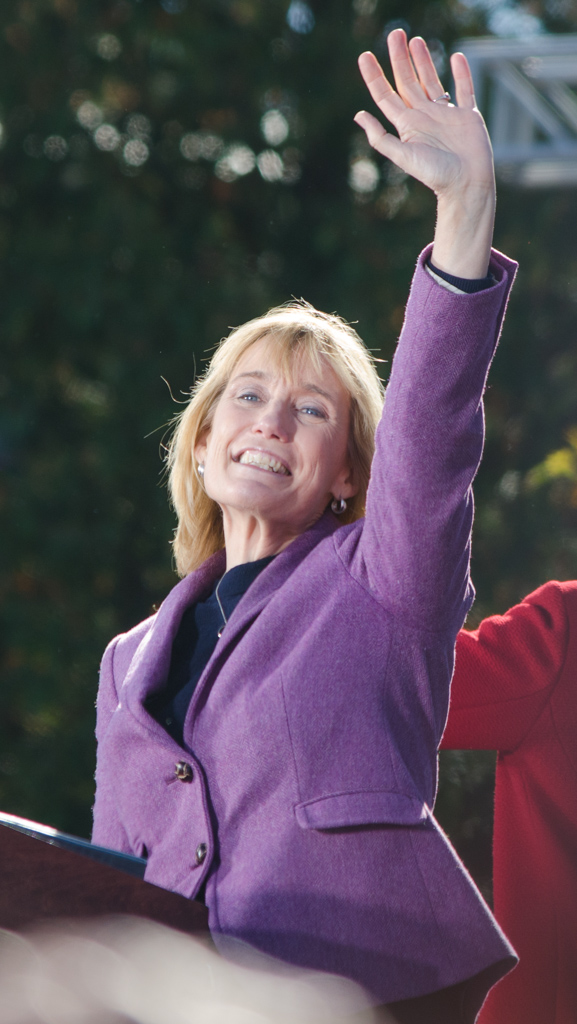
Hassan campaigning at a Hillary Clinton rally in Manchester, New Hampshire, in October 2016.

As a popular governor, Hassan was considered a likely Senate candidate in the 2016 election. Early polling suggested she had a high chance of winning, and both parties were running campaign ads about her before she entered the race. Hassan announced her candidacy in October 2015, and she was unopposed in the Democratic primary. She faced incumbent Kelly Ayotte in the general election.

The race in New Hampshire was expected to be close and was one of the most important races to decide which party would control the Senate. Hassan campaigned on abortion rights, climate change, and reducing the influence of corporations and special interests in federal politics. EMILY's List, a pro-choice political action committee for abortion policy, was the first national endorsement of her campaign. Hassan and Ayotte were also distinguished by their positions on gun control, as Hassan supported restrictions and Ayotte opposed them.

Hassan's campaign sought to associate Ayotte with the Republican Party's presidential nominee, Donald Trump, who was polling behind his opponent in New Hampshire. Ayotte moderated her positions and accused Hassan of being too closely aligned with the Democratic Party. Hassan was sometimes seen as too rigid while speaking, and Ayotte criticized Hassan for running on generic platitudes without giving a specific rationale for running.

Hassan's campaign was affected by a sex scandal at the school where Hassan's husband was principal. She had accepted campaign donations from a teacher who had been accused in 2011 of having sexual relations with students. She responded to the scandal by donating money to the New Hampshire Coalition Against Domestic and Sexual Violence's HAVEN program.

Hassan defeated Ayotte by 1,017 votes, less than one percentage point. She was one of two Senate candidates to unseat an incumbent Republican that year. Hassan declared victory before the election was called, when 299 of 300 precincts had reported their results and she led by 692 votes. Ayotte conceded without requesting a recount. Hassan became the second woman in the United States, after her predecessor Shaheen, to serve as both a governor and a US Senator.

=== First US Senate term (2017–2023) ===
==== 115th United States Congress (2017–2019) ====
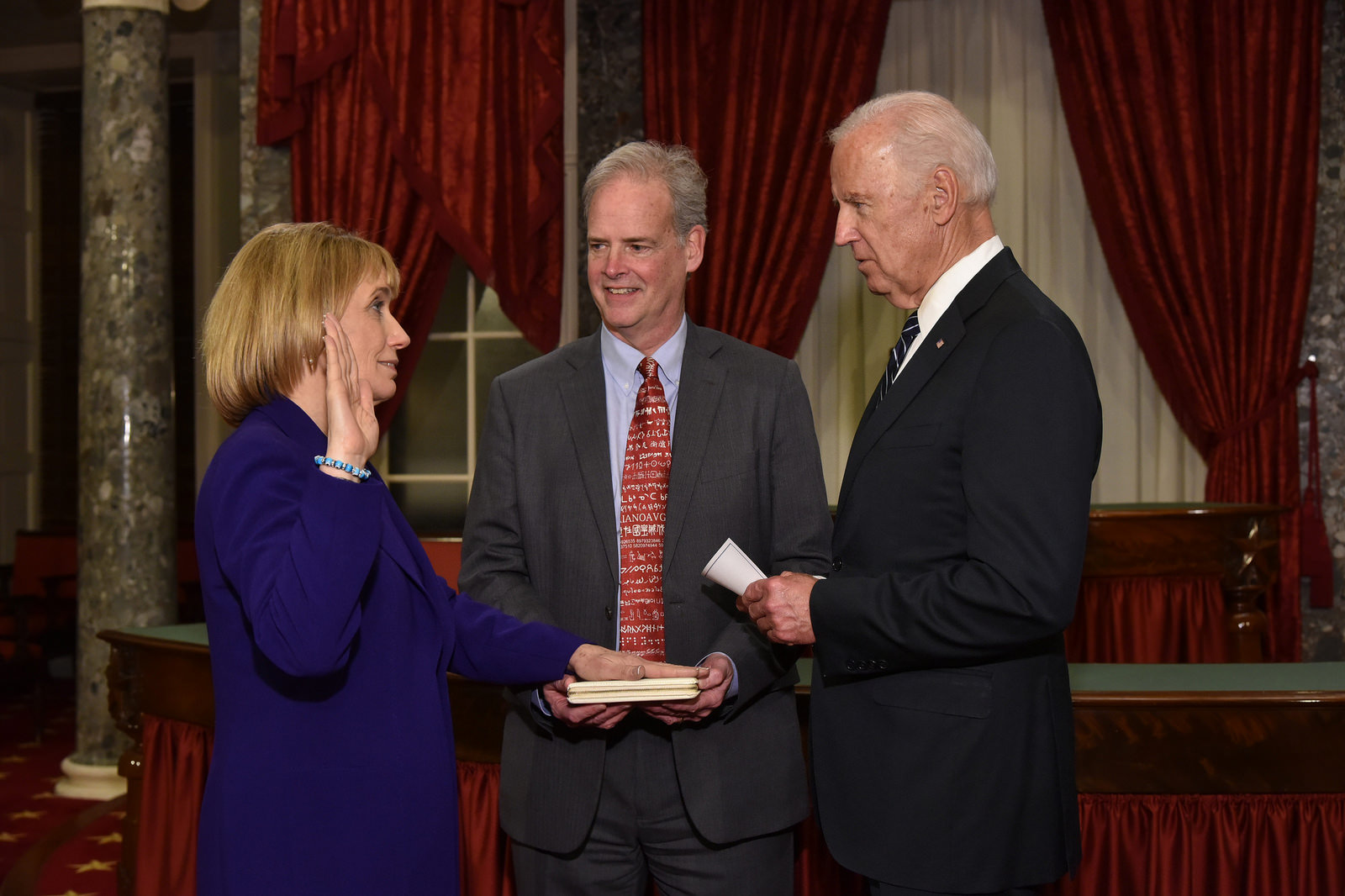
Hassan being sworn in to the U.S. Senate by Vice President Joe Biden in 2017.

Hassan joined the Senate as one of its more moderate Democrats. She stated that her first priority as new senator was the opioid epidemic, and this was the subject of her first speech on the Senate floor. New Hampshire had the third-highest rate of drug overdose deaths, and worked with other legislators from the state to increase funding for the issue. She criticized the Trump administration in a Time magazine op-ed for insufficient action against the epidemic.

Hassan was critical of Betsy DeVos, Donald Trump's nominee for United States Secretary of Education in 2017, for being insufficiently supportive of children with disabilities. Her questioning of DeVos during her Senate confirmation hearing, where Hassan criticized her for being unfamiliar with the Individuals with Disabilities Education Act, increased Hassan's national profile. Hassan opposed the nomination of Gina Haspel as Director of the Central Intelligence Agency because of Haspel's involvement with the use of torture through enhanced interrogation techniques. Hassan called for an independent investigation into Trump's firing of FBI Director James Comey, who had been investigating Russian interference in the 2016 United States elections, but she was unwilling to call the action impeachable or obstruction of justice before an investigation took place.

In February 2018, Hassan joined a bipartisan group to visit the United Kingdom, Israel, Jordan, and Greece. During her first term, Hassan became chairwoman of the Women's Senate Network within the Democratic Senatorial Campaign Committee. She was appointed to the Senate Committee on Finance in 2019. In 2021, Hassan became chair of the Subcommittee on Emerging Threats and Spending Oversight. She primarily used this position to focus on cybersecurity.

In 2018, Hassan suspended an intern for a week for shouting an expletive at Trump, but cautioned that the intern's incivility should not be compared to Trump's. Hassan rejected demands that she fire the intern. The same year, a former system administrator from Hassan's staff used another staff member's access to hack the Senate's computers and release the personal information of five Republican senators who were involved in Brett Kavanaugh's confirmation to the Supreme Court. Another aide pleaded guilty to giving him access.

==== 116th United States Congress (2019–2021) ====
Hassan in 2019

Hassan opposed Trump's nomination of William Barr as attorney general in 2019 because of his stance on executive power and his opinion on the Mueller special counsel investigation into Russian interference. Hassan participated in a bipartisan Trump administration task force to support the reopening of the economy during the COVID-19 pandemic. Hassan was on the shortlist to be selected as Democratic presidential nominee Joe Biden's running mate in the 2020 presidential election, but Kamala Harris was ultimately chosen.

==== 117th United States Congress (2021–2023) ====
Hassan was in the Senate chamber on January 6, 2021, for the 2021 United States Electoral College vote count when Trump supporters stormed the U.S. Capitol. She said that Trump was responsible for inciting the attack and she supported impeaching him to set a precedent that presidents are held accountable during their lame duck period. On January 7, she called for Trump to resign, calling him "unfit for office". She also called for an investigation into the lack of security, poor law enforcement response, and how law enforcement treated the Trump supporters, which contrasted with the treatment of Black Lives Matter protesters.

As of September 2021, Hassan had voted in line with President Biden's stated position 100% of the time. She was among the moderate Democratic senators who criticized the Biden administration as it became less popular. She criticized the 2021 withdrawal of troops from Afghanistan and called for an inquiry into why the United States was unaware of the Taliban's ability to retake the country as quickly as it did. She also accused the Biden administration of responding to inflation too slowly. Along with her fellow senator from New Hampshire Jeanne Shaheen, Hassan was among the strongest defenders of Biden's selection of Michael Delaney, a New Hampshire politician opposed by both parties for his defense of St. Paul's School in a civil sexual assault case, as a federal judge. Hassan criticized Biden's selection of Janet Woodcock as head of the Food and Drug Administration, citing her past handling of the opioid epidemic.

Hassan backed the Biden administration's stimulus plan to restore the economy, but she did not endorse Biden's proposals of raising the national minimum wage to $15 or allowing forgiveness for $10,000 of student loan debt. She was part of a bipartisan group in 2021 crafting infrastructure policy with the Biden administration. She opposed efforts from within her party to tie the infrastructure bill to a more expansive one, saying it was important to pass what they can while the opportunity was available.

In 2022, Hassan traveled to the Mexico–United States border and recorded a video by the border wall to express support for retaining Title 42 expulsion of asylum seekers. Both major parties responded negatively, describing the trip as a photo op, with especially strong backlash from Latino political groups.

Hassan was ranked the most bipartisan senator by the Lugar Center in 2021 by measuring co-sponsorship of bills with members of the opposing party.

=== 2022 election ===
Hassan ran for reelection in 2022 and won the Democratic primary election with 94% of the vote. New Hampshire was one of the six competitive Senate races in 2022, and one of four being defended by Democrats. Hassan's path to reelection was considered especially difficult because Republicans had two popular contenders, Governor Chris Sununu and former Senator Kelly Ayotte. Both declined, and the Republican nomination went to retired general Don Bolduc. Bolduc was criticized within his own party for holding far-right beliefs and promoting conspiracy theories. Both Hassan and Bolduc struggled in polling. Buldoc challenged Hassan to seven debates, and Hassan eventually agreed to one televised debate and two non-televised.

Abortion and inflation were the main issues in Hassan's reelection campaign. The issue of abortion rights brought strong turnout in her favor after Dobbs v. Jackson Women's Health Organization overturned Roe v. Wade and a previous fight over abortion restrictions had taken place in New Hampshire, and she touted herself as bipartisan. Bolduc also campaigned against inflation, and he tied Hassan to the Biden administration's unpopular handling of the economy. Hassan also campaigned on gas prices in 2022, including support for a gas tax holiday and release of oil from the federal oil reserve. She avoided large public events while she was campaigning and instead held smaller events at businesses. Hassan won reelection with 53% of the vote to Bolduc's 44%.

=== Second US Senate term (2023–present) ===
==== 118th United States Congress (2023–2025) ====
In October 2023, Hassan visited China as part of a bipartisan congressional delegation led by Senate Majority Leader Chuck Schumer and met with General Secretary of the Chinese Communist Party Xi Jinping. Hassan criticized the Democratic National Committee for moving the party's first presidential primary election from New Hampshire to South Carolina in 2024.

==== 119th United States Congress (2025–2027) ====
Hassan was among the Democrats who strongly opposed Trump's choice of Robert F. Kennedy Jr. as Secretary of Health and Human Services in 2025, citing her son's experiences with cerebral palsy to criticize Kennedy's spreading of misinformation about medical science. Hassan was one of eight Democratic-aligned senators who voted to end the 2025 shutdown of the federal government, and one of three who then voted to confirm Trump's judicial nominees. As a member of the United States Senate Committee on Homeland Security and Governmental Affairs, Hassan launched an investigation into Homeland Security official Corey Lewandowski in 2026. Hassan was a major critic of public service announcements featuring Trump in 2026, which she said were campaign ads paid for by taxes.

==== 120th United States Congress (2027–2029) ====
Hassan is expected to become chairwoman of the United States Senate Committee on Homeland Security and Governmental Affairs at the start of the 120th United States Congress in January 2027.

=== U.S. Senate committee assignments ===
- Committee on Finance
- Committee on Health, Education, Labor and Pensions
  - Subcommittee on Children and Families
  - Subcommittee on Primary Health and Retirement Security
- Committee on Homeland Security and Governmental Affairs
  - Subcommittee on Emerging Threats and Spending Oversight (Chair)
  - Subcommittee on Federal Spending Oversight and Emergency Management
  - Subcommittee on Regulatory Affairs and Federal Management
- Committee on Veterans Affairs
- Joint Economic Committee

== Political positions ==
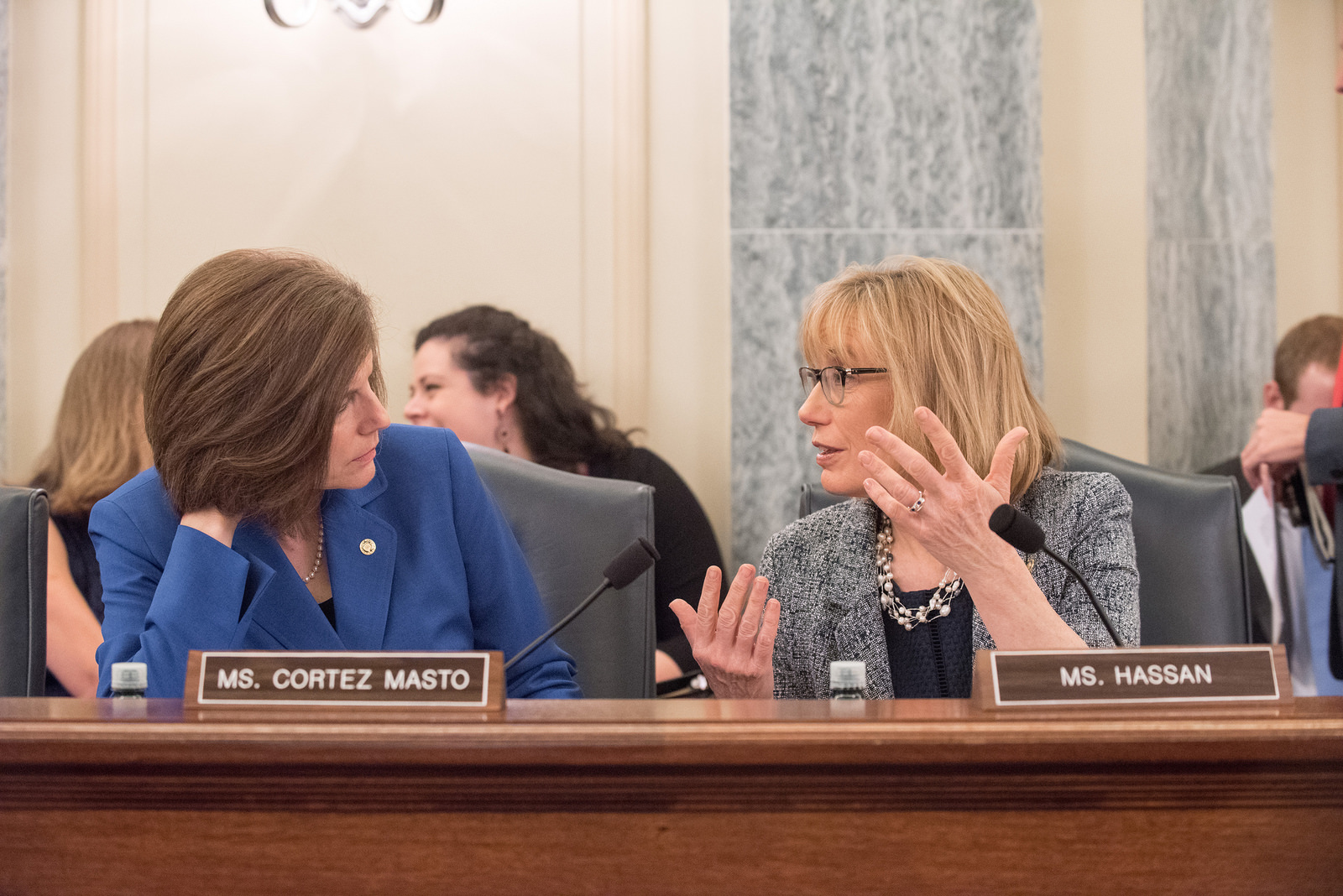
Hassan speaking with Catherine Cortez Masto at a Senate committee hearing in June 2017.

Hassan has been described as a centrist or moderate Democratic and advocates bipartisanship, and she is often a swing vote in the Senate. She is known for being especially polished and on-message when speaking, which critics consider rigid and repetitive, and is known for a cautious, understated approach to policy.

=== Abortion ===
Hassan believes that abortion is an issue of women's rights and women's safety, and she opposes regulation of when abortions can take place, seeing this as a decision between a woman and her doctor. She has criticized New Hampshire's 24-week abortion ban as too restrictive.

Hassan supports a federal law to establish a national right to abortion and requiring insurance companies to cover over-the-counter contraception.

=== Crime ===
As governor, Hassan supported a stronger state trooper presence and the creation of a new women's prison. She advocated the creation of a receiving facility for mental health services in New Hampshire, and pushed for an increase in funding for mental health in response to a class action lawsuit by the United States Department of Justice. Hassan has said cryptocurrency should be regulated because of its use in ransomware attacks and other criminal activity.

=== Drug policy ===
As governor, Hassan signed legislation to legalize medical cannabis but said she would veto any bill that came to her desk to legalize recreational cannabis. As of 2020, NORML, an organization that seeks legalization, gave Hassan a C− grade as a U.S. senator due to her actions as governor. Hassan supports combating the illegal drug market by providing treatment for fentanyl users to reduce demand.

=== Economy ===
Hassan was fiscally conservative as governor of New Hampshire, and she wanted a balanced budget for the state. During her first campaign for governor, Hassan opposed a broad-based tax and opposed tax breaks for businesses. She signed measures to increase the state fuel tax, protect workers' right to discuss their payment with one another, expand the deadline for discrimination complaints from one year to three, and guarantee minimum wage to workers with disabilities. She also launched the Live Free and Start program to encourage tech startup companies to go to New Hampshire. Other economic policies Hassan supported as governor included the legalization of gambling, the creation of a casino to increase revenue for the state, and an increase on cigarette taxes and car registration fees. She vetoed an anti-bullying bill for public employees out of concern that it was too broad.

As a United States Senator, Hassan proposed reducing the cost of living by reducing the federal fuel tax and taking action against the pharmaceutical industry. She expressed support for increasing the cap on income taxes that go into Social Security, suggesting that the rich "pay a little bit more into the system". Hassan opposed the Trump administration's tariffs, saying they were causing inflation and hurting American's retirement savings. Policies she has supported include increasing financial assistance for home heating systems, passing the CHIPS and Science Act to encourage domestic production of semiconductors, guaranteeing the right of firefighters and emergency medical services to unionize, and regulating video games that use loot boxes to charge real money. Hassan has accused oil companies of raising prices despite record profits.

Hassan said that the federal minimum wage of $7.25 per hour was too low in 2016 and supported raising it to $12 per hour. She still supported a $12 per hour minimum wage in 2021, while she opposed increasing the federal minimum wage to $15 per hour out of concern for how it would affect small businesses during the COVID-19 pandemic. She supported raising the New Hampshire minimum wage while she was governor.

=== Education ===
Hassan proposed a bill in 2017 that would defer student loan payments for the founders and employees of small businesses, and in 2022 called for an investigation to determine whether student loan providers misled borrowers of non-qualified loans on their rights following bankruptcy. As governor, Hassan oversaw the reduction of community college tuition and the freezing of state university tuition. She supported increased spending for higher education as governor, and she doubled tax credits for research and development in universities.

Hassan supports reforming how elementary schools and high schools assess students. She vetoed a bill as governor that would have challenged the use of Common Core standards in New Hampshire, and she sponsored a bill in the United States Senate that would allocate funds to provide mental health services in schools. Hassan has argued that school vouchers disadvantage students with disabilities by leaving them in public schools while other students are able to attend private schools.

=== Environment ===
Hassan advocates a stronger response to prevent climate change, including the allocation of federal funding to multi-state climate change programs, and restoring a tax credit for homeowners who implement upgrades for energy efficiency. She has sought for the National Academy of Sciences to carry out a study of net metering.

As a state senator, Hassan pushed to reduce mercury emissions in coal power plants. She introduced a bill to the United States Senate in 2021 to ban PFAS chemicals from food packaging.

=== Firearms ===
As governor, Hassan vetoed multiple bills that would allow concealed carry without a license. In 2016, she joined state representatives in a sit-in protesting a lack of gun regulations. In the United States Senate, she proposed legislation to ban firearm accessories like bump stocks and trigger cranks that increase the rate of fire of semi-automatic firearms. She supports background checks to prevent the mentally ill from purchasing firearms. In 2012, the National Review reported that Hassan had a "D" grade from the NRA Political Victory Fund (NRA-PVF).

=== Foreign policy ===
During her first campaign for the United States Senate, Hassan called for more airstrikes and special forces deployments to combat terrorism, including the destruction of the Islamic State. She endorsed the airstrike on Syria Trump ordered in 2017 as retaliation for a Syrian chemical attack against its own people, but insisted that Trump must not take further action without consulting Congress and international allies. Hassan was among 23 Senate Democrats to vote for a resolution criticizing excessive withdrawal from Syria and Afghanistan in 2019. Following the 2021 American withdrawal from Afghanistan, Hassan criticized Biden's decision to follow a deadline for withdrawal, which she called arbitrary.

In 2015, Hassan criticized the Boycott, Divestment and Sanctions movement and expressed support for Israel's "right to exist and defend itself". She voted against a measure to block the sale of American weapons to Israel during the Gaza war. Hassan has expressed support for NATO and opposition to Russian expansion. She believes the United States should support Ukraine in the Russo-Ukrainian war, saying it is important to support democracies. In 2021, Hassan introduced legislation tying foreign aid to prevention of fentanyl trafficking. She supported the Iran nuclear deal as a way to prevent Iran from developing nuclear weapons.

=== Gay rights ===
Hassan was an early Democratic supporter of same-sex marriage and helped legalize it in New Hampshire while in the state senate. She presented three versions of a same-sex marriage bill, one of which gained enough support to pass both chambers. She issued an executive order in 2016 while governor to ban the government of New Hampshire from discriminating on the basis of gender identity.

=== Government reform ===
In her first term in the United States Senate, Hassan supported an election reform bill that she said would make elections fairer and more accessible. The bill included requirements for automatic voter registration, early voting, reduction of voter identification laws, campaign finance reform, and independent redistricting. Hassan supports abolishing the Electoral College and selecting the president by popular vote. She has supported term limits for Supreme Court justices but opposes increasing the court's size. Hassan supported abolishing the Senate filibuster in 2021 while Democrats were attempting to pass voting rights legislation. She opposes using reconciliation to enact progressive policy. Hassan proposed a bill in the New Hampshire Senate to restrict campaign spending by third-parties, but it never reached a vote.

=== Health and healthcare ===
Hassan at a rally for the Americans with Disabilities Act in 2018

Hassan supports the Affordable Care Act. She supported regulating healthcare costs in New Hampshire while she was in the state senate, and as governor she obtained a Medicaid expansion for New Hampshire through the Affordable Care Act. Hassan opposed Trump's healthcare reform in 2017 because it would reduce Medicaid spending, which she argued would make it harder to combat the opioid epidemic. She supports the ability of Medicare to negotiate pharmaceutical prices and proposed allowing Medicaid to fund home care treatment for the elderly and people with disabilities.

As governor, Hassan sought an increase to the cigarette tax. In the Senate, Hassan passed a bill in 2020 regulating hidden fees in medical bills, introduced a bill that would prevent discrimination against patients with disabilities when seeking organ transplants, and endorsed the Biden administration's decision to reduce restrictions on the prescription of buprenorphine as an alternative to opioids.

=== Immigration ===
Hassan supports strengthening border control. She has called for the deployment of additional law enforcement, construction to fill gaps in physical barriers on the border, and the implementation of new technology to detect fentanyl trafficking. Hassan supported barring entrance for Syrian refugees during the Syrian refugee crisis in 2015 until vetting procedures were expanded. She opposed the Trump border wall, which she considered "expensive and ineffective", and she criticized the travel ban implemented by the Trump administration in 2017, calling it "a backdoor Muslim ban". She then criticized the Biden administration for what she said was insufficient vetting of immigrants. Hassan split with the Democratic Party in 2022 when she supported retaining Title 42 expulsion, which allowed the government to expel asylum seekers as a means to prevent the spread of COVID-19. She was one of twelve Democratic senators who joined Republicans in passing the Laken Riley Act in 2025, which required undocumented immigrants to be held without bond when charged with theft or violent crimes.

=== Infrastructure and transportation ===
Hassan voted in favor of seat belt legislation while serving in the New Hampshire Senate. As governor, Hassan unsuccessfully pushed for a commuter rail to Boston. As a senator, Hassan passed legislation in 2017 protecting passenger rights following the violent removal of a passenger on a United Airlines flight and granting protections for passengers with disabilities.

During the presidency of Joe Biden, Hassan said her priority on infrastructure was to obtain bipartisan support instead of including all the Biden administration's policies. Hassan supports the expansion of broadband internet and incorporated it into infrastructure legislation in 2021.

=== National security ===
Hassan with Senator Jon Tester at a Homeland Security and Governmental Affairs Committee meeting in 2017

Hassan has pushed for expanding cybersecurity measures, including the establishment of Department of Homeland Security cybersecurity coordinators with each state. As governor, she formed the New Hampshire Cybersecurity Integration Center. Hassan introduced provisions into the 2022 annual defense budget to prevent women in the military from paying more for their uniforms. Hassan opposes closing the Guantanamo Bay detention camp, breaking with her party.

== Personal life ==
Hassan is a member of the United Church of Christ. She is married to Thomas Hassan, a former principal of Phillips Exeter Academy in New Hampshire. They have two children, and she cites her son's cerebral palsy as a reason for entering politics. Hassan has received honorary doctorates from the University of New Hampshire (2013), Northeastern University (2013), Southern New Hampshire University (2014), New Hampshire Institute of Art (2015), New England College (2016), and UNH School of Law (2017).

== Electoral history ==
=== State Senate ===
New Hampshire State Senate election in the 23rd district, 2002
Party	Candidate	Votes	%
Republican	Russell Prescott (incumbent)	10,659	54.04
Democratic	Maggie Hassan	9,067	45.96
Total votes		19,726	100.00

New Hampshire State Senate election in the 23rd district, 2004
Party	Candidate	Votes	%
Democratic	Maggie Hassan	15,201	51.96
Republican	Russell Prescott (incumbent)	14,054	48.04
Total votes		29,255	100.00

New Hampshire State Senate election in the 23rd district, 2006
Party	Candidate	Votes	%
Democratic	Maggie Hassan	10,566	60.12
Republican	Natalie Healy	7,008	39.88
Total votes		17,574	100.00

New Hampshire State Senate election in the 23rd district, 2008
Party	Candidate	Votes	%
Democratic	Maggie Hassan	17,212	57.20
Republican	Lee Quandt	12,877	42.80
Total votes		30,089	100.00

New Hampshire State Senate election in the 23rd district, 2010
Party	Candidate	Votes	%
Republican	Russell Prescott	11,001	53.38
Democratic	Maggie Hassan (inc.)	9,606	46.62
Total votes		20,607	100.00

=== Governor ===
2012 Democratic primary results
Party	Candidate	Votes	%
Democratic	Maggie Hassan	45,120	53.1
Democratic	Jackie Cilley	33,066	38.9
Democratic	Bill Kennedy	5,936	7.0
Democratic	Other	850	1.0
Total votes		84,972	100

2012 New Hampshire gubernatorial election
Party	Candidate	Votes	%	±%
Democratic	Maggie Hassan	378,934	54.61%	+1.98%
Republican	Ovide Lamontagne	295,026	42.52%	−2.51%
Libertarian	John J. Babiarz	19,251	2.77%	+0.56%
n/a	Write-ins	666	0.10%	−0.02%
Total votes		693,877	100.0%	N/A
Democratic hold				

2014 New Hampshire gubernatorial election
Party	Candidate	Votes	%	±%
Democratic	Maggie Hassan (incumbent)	254,666	52.38%	−2.23%
Republican	Walt Havenstein	230,610	47.43%	+4.91%
n/a	Write-ins	907	0.19%	+0.09%
Total votes		486,183	100.0%	N/A
Democratic hold				

=== U.S. Senate ===
2016 United States Senate election in New Hampshire
Party	Candidate	Votes	%	±%
Democratic	Maggie Hassan	354,649	47.99%	+11.25%
Republican	Kelly Ayotte (incumbent)	353,632	47.84%	−12.32%
Independent	Aaron Day	17,742	2.40%	N/A
Libertarian	Brian Chabot	12,597	1.70%	+0.65%
n/a	Write-ins	520	0.07%	N/A
Total votes		739,140	100.0%	N/A
Democratic gain from Republican				

2022 United States Senate election in New Hampshire
Party	Candidate	Votes	%	±%
Democratic	Maggie Hassan (incumbent)	332,193	53.50%	+5.52%
Republican	Don Bolduc	275,928	44.43%	−3.41%
Libertarian	Jeremy Kauffman	12,390	2.00%	+0.30%
n/a	Write-ins	464	0.07%	–
Total votes		620,975	100.0%	
Democratic hold				

== See also ==
- List of female governors in the United States
- Women in the United States Senate

== Works cited ==
- Barone, Michael; McCutchenon, Chuck (2013). The Almanac of American Politics 2014. University of Chicago Press. ISBN 978-0-226-10544-4.
- Cohen, Richard E.; Barnes, James A. (2015). The Almanac of American Politics 2016. Columbia Books & Information Services. ISBN 978-1-938518-30-0.
- Cohen, Richard; Barnes, James A. (2017). The Almanac of American Politics 2018. Columbia Books & Information Services. ISBN 978-1-938939-58-7.
- Cohen, Richard; Cook, Charlie (2019). The Almanac of American Politics 2020. Columbia Books & Information Services. ISBN 978-1-938939-88-4.
- Cohen, Richard; Cook, Charlie (2021). The Almanac of American Politics 2022. Columbia Books & Information Services. ISBN 978-1-952374-09-8.
- Cohen, Richard; Cook, Charlie (2023). The Almanac of American Politics 2024. Columbia Books & Information Services. ISBN 978-1-952374-18-0.
- Galdieri, Christopher J.; Lucas, Jennifer C.; Sisco, Tauna S. (2023). "New Hampshire Senate Race: Slow and Steady Keeps the Seat Blue". In Wilson, Walter Clark; Foreman, Sean D.; Godwin, Marcia L. (eds.). The Roads to Congress 2022: Controversies and Competing Visions for America's Future. Palgrave Macmillan. pp. 253–268. ISBN 978-3-031-42748-0.
- LaWare, Margaret (2019). "Hassan, Margaret "Maggie"". In Bystrom, Dianne G.; Burrell, Barbara (eds.). Women in the American Political System: An Encyclopedia of Women as Voters, Candidates, and Office Holders. Vol. I. ABC-CLIO. pp. 200–203. ISBN 978-1-4408-4612-0.
- Lucas, Jennifer; Sisco, Tauna S.; Galdieri, Christopher (2018). "New Hampshire Senate Race: Closest in the Nation". In Foreman, Sean D.; Godwin, Marcia L. (eds.). The Roads to Congress 2016: American Elections in a Divided Landscape. Palgrave Macmillan. pp. 321–337. ISBN 978-3-319-58094-4.

New Hampshire Senate
Preceded by Joseph Foster	Majority Leader of the New Hampshire Senate; 2008–2010	Succeeded by Jeb Bradley
Party political offices
Preceded by John Lynch	Democratic nominee for Governor of New Hampshire; 2012, 2014	Succeeded by Colin Van Ostern
Preceded by Paul Hodes	Democratic nominee for U.S. Senator from New Hampshire (Class 3); 2016, 2022	Most recent
Political offices
Preceded by John Lynch	Governor of New Hampshire; 2013–2017	Succeeded by Chuck Morse; Acting
U.S. Senate
Preceded by Kelly Ayotte	United States Senator (Class 3) from New Hampshire; 2017–present Served alongside: Jeanne Shaheen, Chris Pappas (elect)	Incumbent
U.S. order of precedence (ceremonial)
Preceded by Tammy Duckworth	Order of precedence of the United States as United States Senator	Succeeded by John Kennedy
Preceded by Tammy Duckworth	United States senators by seniority 59th	Succeeded by John Kennedy
