= Ron Johnson =

American politician (born 1955)

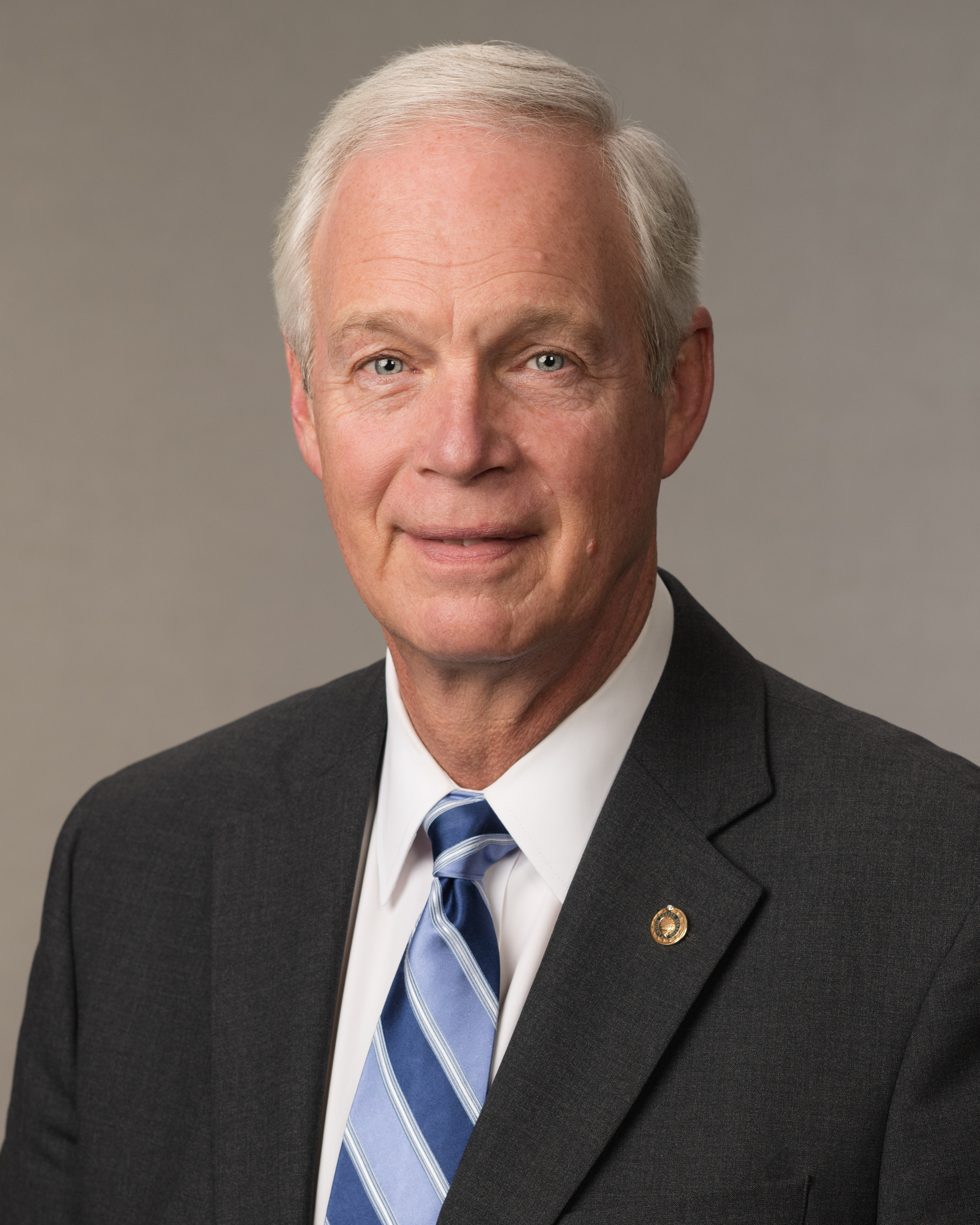
- Official portrait, 2020

United States Senator from Wisconsin
- Incumbent
- Assumed office January 3, 2011 Serving with Tammy Baldwin
- Preceded by: Russ Feingold
Senate positions
Chair of the Senate Budget Committee
Incumbent
Assumed office July 21, 2026
Preceded by	Lindsey Graham
Chair of the Senate Homeland Security Committee
In office January 3, 2015 – February 3, 2021
Preceded by	Tom Carper
Succeeded by	Gary Peters

Personal details
- Born: Ronald Harold Johnson; April 8, 1955 (age 71) Mankato, Minnesota, U.S.
- Party: Republican
- Spouse: Jane Curler (m. 1977)
- Children: 3
- Education: University of Minnesota (BS)
- Website: Senate website Campaign website
- Johnson's voice Johnson's tribute to Bart Starr, former Green Bay Packers quarterback. Recorded November 19, 2015

Ronald Harold Johnson (born April 8, 1955) is an American businessman and politician serving as the senior United States senator from Wisconsin, a seat he has held since 2011. A Republican, Johnson was first elected to the U.S. Senate in 2010, defeating Democratic incumbent Russ Feingold. Johnson defeated Feingold in a rematch in 2016, and defeated Lieutenant Governor Mandela Barnes in 2022. Before entering politics, he was chief executive officer of a plastics manufacturer in Oshkosh, Wisconsin.

Johnson entered politics to oppose the Affordable Care Act and credits the Tea Party movement with his political ascent, though he does not personally identify with the movement. As a freshman senator, he gained a reputation for opposing government spending and seeking a balanced budget, having stalled or voted against budget proposals from both major parties for not offsetting spending. He is also critical of the Social Security program and has called for its partial privatization. Johnson has promoted various political conspiracy theories, including the Biden–Ukraine conspiracy theory, connections between vaccines and autism, election denial, the Great Replacement conspiracy theory, and 9/11 conspiracy theories. He advocates the use of alternative medicine and sponsored a right-to-try law to legalize the use of experimental medical treatments. Johnson also supports stronger measures against crime and illegal immigration, expansion of free trade, rejection of the scientific consensus on climate change, and protection of the right to bear arms.

Starting in his second term, Johnson aligned himself with Donald Trump. As chair of the Committee on Homeland Security and Governmental Affairs, he led investigations into Hillary Clinton, Hunter Biden, and officials involved in the FBI investigation of the Trump campaign. Johnson also worked on Ukraine–United States relations during his second term and saw Ukraine as an ally against Russia, but stopped supporting military aid for Ukraine after Russia invaded Ukraine in 2022 because he believed a Russian victory was inevitable. Due to his interactions with Ukrainian officials, Johnson was a major witness in the 2019 Trump–Ukraine scandal and the subsequent impeachment of Donald Trump, which he said was an attempt to sabotage Trump. In his third term, Johnson has focused on investigating corruption in federal agencies, which he alleges are working against the Trump administration.

== Early life and business career ==
Ronald Harold Johnson was born on April 8, 1955, in Mankato, Minnesota. He was the son of Jean Johnson, a film processor, and Dale Johnson, a treasurer who worked both corporately and for the church. He held several jobs in his youth, including as a newspaper delivery boy, a caddie, a hay baler on his uncle's farm, a dishwasher, the night manager of a restaurant, and at a school yearbook company. Johnson attended Edina High School but skipped his senior year and graduated from the University of Minnesota in 1977 with a bachelor's degree in business and accounting. He began working as an accountant while studying for a Master of Business Administration, but he ended his studies in 1979 to enter business.

Johnson moved to Oshkosh, Wisconsin, where he worked as a machine operator and accountant to help establish the Pacur plastic company with his brother-in-law in 1979. He became Pacur's CEO in the mid-1980s when his brother-in-law left the company. The family sold Pacur to Bowater Industries for $18,000,000 (equivalent to $44,000,000 in 2025) in 1987, but Johnson remained CEO. He purchased Pacur from Bowater in 1997 and remained CEO until he was elected to the Senate in 2010.

In October 2009, Michelle Litjens invited Johnson to speak at an Oshkosh rally associated with the Tea Party movement. He was asked to speak about his experiences as a businessman regarding government regulation but extended the scope of his speech to health care reform and his daughter's heart defect. The speech was well-received among conservatives and gained him political support. Afterward, he reached out to Litjens to help him launch a campaign for the Senate. Johnson's wife took convincing, saying "absolutely not" when he first raised the idea.

== U.S. Senate ==
=== 2010 Senate election ===
==== 2010 Republican primary election ====
Without previous political experience, Johnson announced his candidacy in the 2010 United States Senate election in Wisconsin a week before the May 15 Republican convention. He cited his opposition to the Affordable Care Act (ACA) as his reason for running, saying it was "the greatest assault on our freedom in my lifetime". Johnson first became known statewide with the assistance of conservative political commentator Charlie Sykes, who later opposed Johnson because of Johnson's support for Donald Trump. Since the Republican candidates entered the race late in the year, there was no time to seek donors, which made Johnson's personal wealth an advantage.

The other major Republican candidate for the Senate nomination, Wisconsin Secretary of Commerce Dick Leinenkugel, withdrew during the convention and gave a surprise endorsement to Johnson. Johnson also gained the support of Senator Jim DeMint, who held influence over the support received by Republican candidates. Johnson won the Republican primary in September with 85% of the vote, defeating Dave Westlake and Stephen Finn, who received 10% and 5%, respectively. Johnson's other opponent, Terrence Wall, dropped out of the race.

==== 2010 general election ====
Final results by county in 2010: Ron Johnson: 70–80%; 60–70%; 50–60%; 40–50%; Russ Feingold: 80–90%; 60–70%; 50–60%

Wisconsin had long been a competitive state where both Democratic and Republican candidates were viable. The Democratic nominee in the general election, Russ Feingold, was the incumbent and had won his previous race by 11 points. Johnson's campaign was concerned about his debates against Feingold, an experienced public speaker, so they began practicing a month in advance in what Johnson called "murder sessions". Both candidates were seen as having performed well in the three debates. Feingold was the favorite to win early in the race, but polling fluctuated over the following months and was even in the days leading up to the election.

Johnson ran as a political outsider and small-business owner while criticizing Feingold as a Washington insider. His messaging emphasized fiscal responsibility, including job creation and reduction of the national debt. Johnson did not fully align with the Tea Party movement's strict reading of the Constitution, but his campaign had its backing and he was seen as a Tea Party candidate.

The main issue Johnson campaigned on was opposition to the Recovery Act and the ACA, both passed by the Obama administration. He launched his campaign by telling the Milwaukee Journal Sentinel that the United States "would have been far better off not spending any of the money and [letting] the recovery happen as it was going to happen". He rarely went into detail on other policies during the campaign. He declined to say how he would reduce the federal budget if elected, saying he was not going to "start naming things to be attacked about".

Johnson took controversial positions on several issues. He vocally denied the scientific consensus on climate change, and his endorsement of the oil industry was scrutinized after it was discovered he owned $100,000 of stock in BP. He walked back statements in which he said he supported firearms licenses and supported drilling for oil in the Great Lakes, describing himself as a political novice who misspoke. After these gaffes, the campaign avoided frequent public appearances.

The campaign ran a series of TV commercials, including ads in which Johnson's children praised him, he called the national debt "inter-generational theft", and he criticized the Senate for lacking manufacturers or accountants while having 57 members who were lawyers. From September 1 to the end of the campaign, Johnson ran more ads than any other Senate candidate nationwide, with Feingold running the second-most. In January 2010, Citizens United v. FEC overturned limits on how much organizations may spend on political campaigns, and nearly all the race's outside funds were in support of Johnson. His campaign spent about $15 million, including $8.7 million of his own money.

==== 2010 results and transition period ====
Johnson was elected to the Senate with 51.9% of the vote to Feingold's 47.0%. The 2010 elections were favorable to the Republican Party, which saw victories across the nation and especially in Wisconsin. Candidates without previous political experience, such as Johnson, also did particularly well in 2010.

After Johnson was elected, Johnson sold the majority of his liquid assets, retaining a 401(k) account and a 5% share of Pacur that he held until 2020. He also continued receiving payments from the company. He chose not to create a blind trust, saying it would not help because his family would still have ownership. Pacur paid Johnson $10 million in deferred compensation in the months after the election, which covered the period from 1997 to 2011, during which he took no salary as CEO. He disputed allegations that the compensation was related to the contributions he had made to his campaign.

=== First term (2011–2017) ===
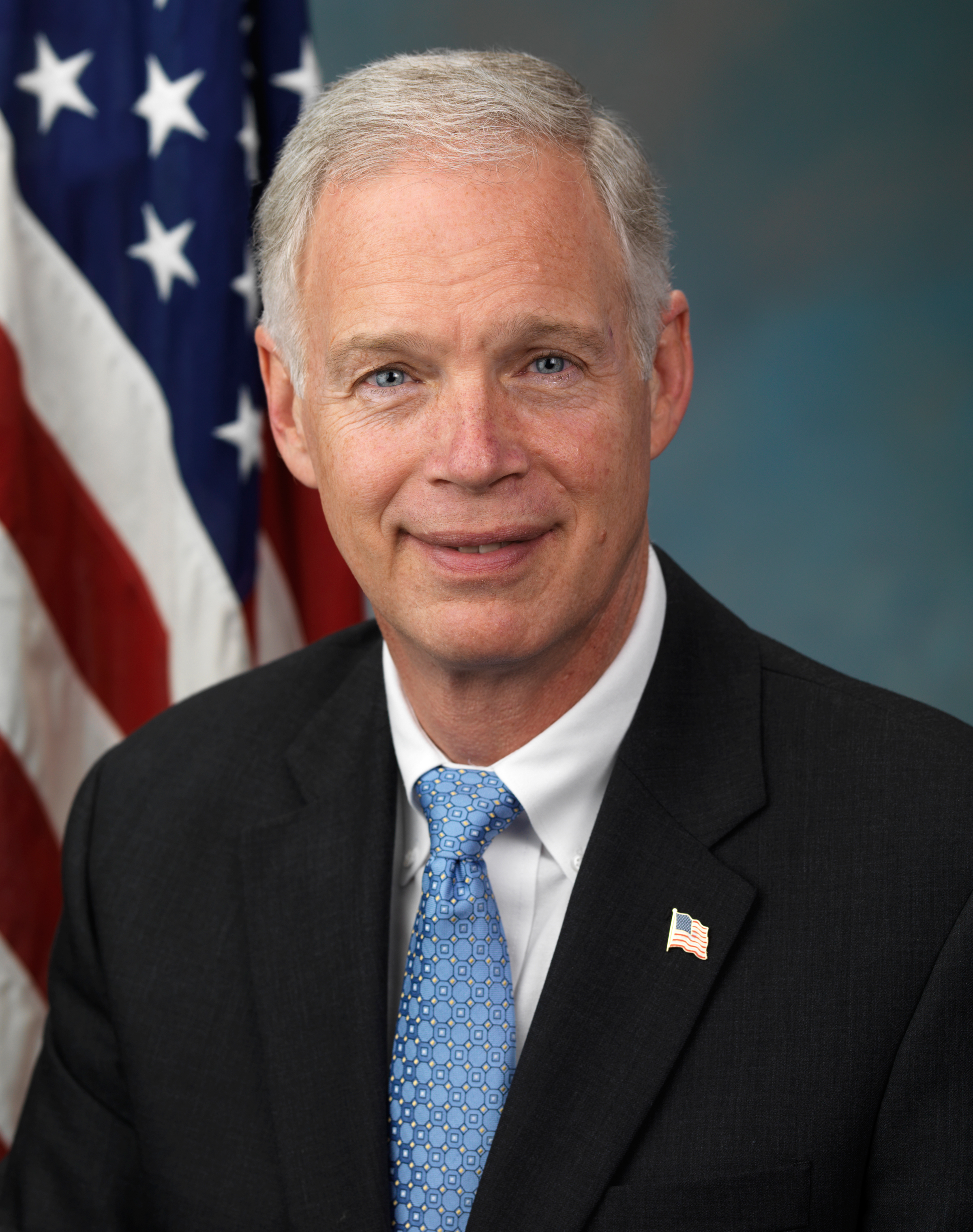
Freshman portrait of Johnson from the 112th Congress

Upon entering the Senate, Johnson was appointed to the Committee on the Budget and Committee on Appropriations. He sought the position of vice chairman of the Senate Republican Conference in December 2011, but Roy Blunt was selected with 25 votes to Johnson's 22 votes. In Johnson's first term, he was mainly identified with his focus on federal spending and the national debt. He involved himself in fiscal issues and quickly became an influential member of the Senate in this area.

Johnson stepped down from the Committee on Appropriations in 2013 because he objected to the other committee members' permissiveness about spending, and joined the Committee on Foreign Relations. He used his position on the committee to investigate overuse of painkillers by the Department of Veterans Affairs and facilitate passage of the Integrated Public Alert and Warning System Act of 2015, which updated the warning system of the same name. In 2014, President Barack Obama unexpectedly appointed Johnson as a representative to a session of the United Nations General Assembly despite Johnson's opposition to both Obama and the United Nations. The same year, Johnson advocated greater international action against Ebola during the Western African Ebola epidemic.

Through Johnson's position on the Committee of Foreign Relations, he participated in the investigation into the 2012 Benghazi attack and was one of the most prominent critics of how Secretary of State Hillary Clinton handled it. An argument between Johnson and Clinton during a hearing became the basis for Republican attack ads against Clinton, though Johnson caused backlash for accusing her of faking her emotional state.

In 2014, Johnson sued the United States Office of Personnel Management to challenge the subsidies that the ACA gave members of Congress and their staff. His lawsuit alleged that it inflicted him with administrative burden, that it gave him an unfair benefit over his constituents, and that it was "an unlawful scheme". The case was dismissed when Judge William C. Griesbach found that Johnson lacked standing because no injury took place.

In 2016, Johnson rejected Republican presidential nominee Trump's allegations that the upcoming election would be rigged.

=== 2016 Senate election ===
Final results by county in 2016: Ron Johnson: 70–80%; 60–70%; 50–60%; 40–50%; Russ Feingold: 70–80%; 60–70%; 50–60%; 40–50%

In March 2013, Johnson announced that he would seek reelection in 2016. In November 2014, he said he would not self-finance his campaign. In December 2014, the Washington Post rated Johnson the most vulnerable incumbent U.S. senator in the 2016 election cycle. He ran unopposed in the Republican primary election. The Democrats nominated Feingold again, leading to a rematch of the 2010 election. Until the campaign's final weeks, Feingold led in polling and was widely expected to win. Johnson had low name recognition for an incumbent seeking reelection, with 23% of Wisconsin voters having no opinion of him.

Johnson hired his brother Dean Johnson, a television producer, to assist in his campaign. The campaign's TV ads showed Johnson facilitating a couple's adoption of a child from the Democratic Republic of the Congo and changing his grandson's diaper as the infant urinated on him.

Senate Republicans cut off support to Johnson, believing the campaign was not viable enough to justify the cost, so he turned to the Republican leadership in the House of Representatives and worked with Speaker Paul Ryan. To improve Johnson's chances, Ryan expressed willingness to campaign with Republican presidential nominee Trump despite their animosity toward each other. Ryan was turned down. Johnson personally avoided tying himself to Trump until Trump's support in Wisconsin became apparent.

Johnson made his support for small government a key element of his campaign and used a get out the vote approach to gain voters. He returned to his 2010 campaign strategy of presenting himself as a businessman and a political outsider while portraying Feingold as a career politician. He argued that Feingold was a hypocrite for accepting campaign funds from outside Wisconsin despite advocating campaign finance reform. The Supreme Court nomination of Merrick Garland was pending in 2016, and Johnson campaigned on confirming a more conservative nominee who would uphold the right to bear arms. In contrast with his previous campaign, Johnson did not campaign on repealing the ACA.

Johnson was reelected with 50.2% of the vote to Feingold's 46.8%. He performed especially well with rural, white, male voters without college degrees, and his performance in the Milwaukee suburbs meant that he outperformed Trump's campaign in Wisconsin.

=== Second term (2017–2023) ===
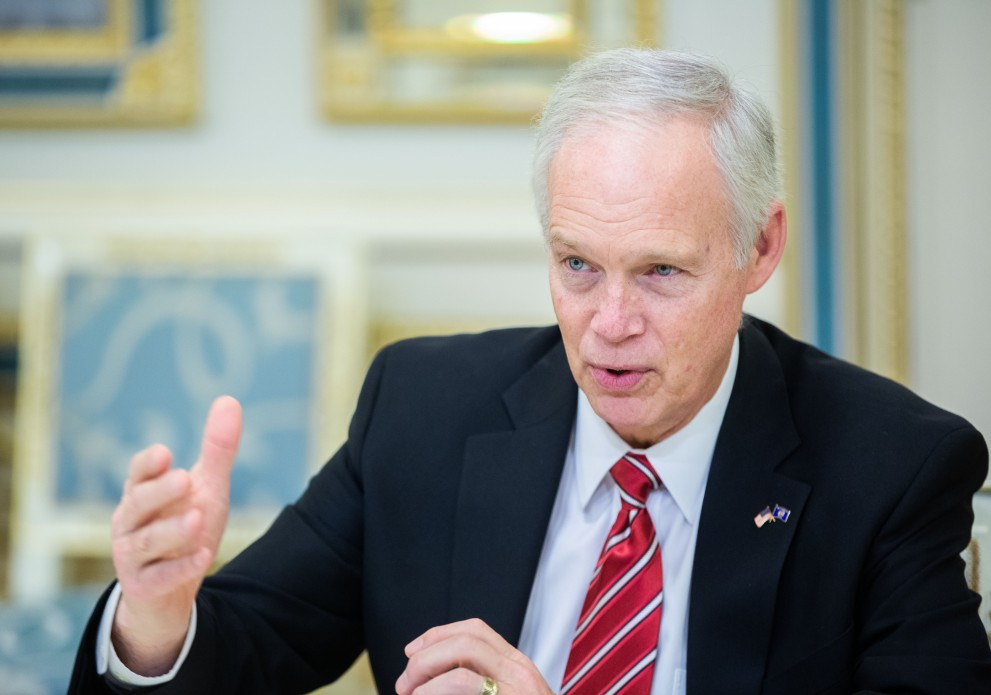
Ron Johnson in 2018

Johnson's politics became more right-wing during his second term and he expressed support for various political conspiracy theories. He was a close ally of the Trump administration, though he disagreed with the administration on economic issues because of its willingness to increase government spending. Johnson initially opposed the Tax Cuts and Jobs Act in 2017, feeling it was too generous to larger corporations and did too little for small businesses, and he objected to how the bill would affect companies using a pass-through model, but he was successful in getting a 20% deduction in taxation for pass-through businesses. When accused of benefiting from the tax breaks, he said it benefited him because tax breaks benefit everyone.

As chair of the Committee on Homeland Security and Governmental Affairs, Johnson launched investigations into several people associated with the Obama administration, including Clinton and Vice President Joe Biden's son Hunter Biden. Johnson probed Hunter Biden's involvement with Ukraine and the contents of his laptop but did not present evidence of wrongdoing. He pressed the issue even after many in his party had abandoned it. He had some Republican support, but critics from both parties accused him of using the issue to spread Russian disinformation and gain support for Trump's reelection. Johnson himself was among the most prominent targets of ethics investigations by the Democratic Party. He was accused of abusing flights to Florida and of giving his chief of staff $280,000 in violation of Senate rules. The flights complaint was dismissed, and Johnson justified the payment as a personal gift for the recipient's cancer treatment.

After the 2018 Wisconsin elections, Johnson was the only Republican holding statewide office in Wisconsin and came to be seen as a leader of the state's Republican Party. He attributed that year's Republican defeats to a lack of grassroots organization or work with local political groups. Johnson criticized Senate Republicans for prioritizing their political careers over enacting conservative policy and pushed them to take stronger positions, especially on repealing the ACA. Republicans negotiated with Johnson to gain his support for a more limited rollback of the policy, including an argument between Johnson and Senate Majority Leader Mitch McConnell on the Senate floor. Johnson eventually agreed, but the bill was unsuccessful. Johnson's approval rating in Wisconsin began falling in 2019.

In 2021, during the Biden administration Johnson delayed passage of the American Rescue Plan Act. He forced a reading of all 628 pages of the bill on the grounds that the Senate had not had enough time to read it. The same year, he voted against funding highways and transit programs through the Infrastructure Investment and Jobs Act and called the trial of Derek Chauvin for the murder of George Floyd a distraction from immigration issues.

Johnson voted to confirm Neil Gorsuch, Brett Kavanaugh, and Amy Coney Barrett to the Supreme Court and voted against the confirmation of Ketanji Brown Jackson. In 2022, he blocked a Biden administration nominee, William Pocan, from serving as a federal district court judge in Wisconsin despite previously endorsing him.

==== Trump–Russia investigations ====
In January 2018, Johnson said an informant had told him that the FBI and Department of Justice had conspired against Trump after he won the 2016 presidential election. He agreed that the Russian government likely interfered in the election, but he opened investigations into the FBI investigation of the Trump campaign's dealings with Russia, said Congress should have handled the special counsel investigation into Russian interference, and said that Robert Mueller, who headed the special counsel, should not have been involved because he was a former FBI director.

Johnson accused FBI members of forming a "secret society" that held secret meetings, referencing the use of the term in text messages between FBI officials Peter Strzok and Lisa Page. Along with several other Congressional Republicans, he called for a special counsel to investigate the FBI. The FBI contacted Johnson in August 2020 to warn him that the Russian government might use him to spread disinformation. Johnson said they could not provide any details and accused them of organizing the briefing so it could be leaked to make him look bad.

==== First impeachment of Donald Trump ====
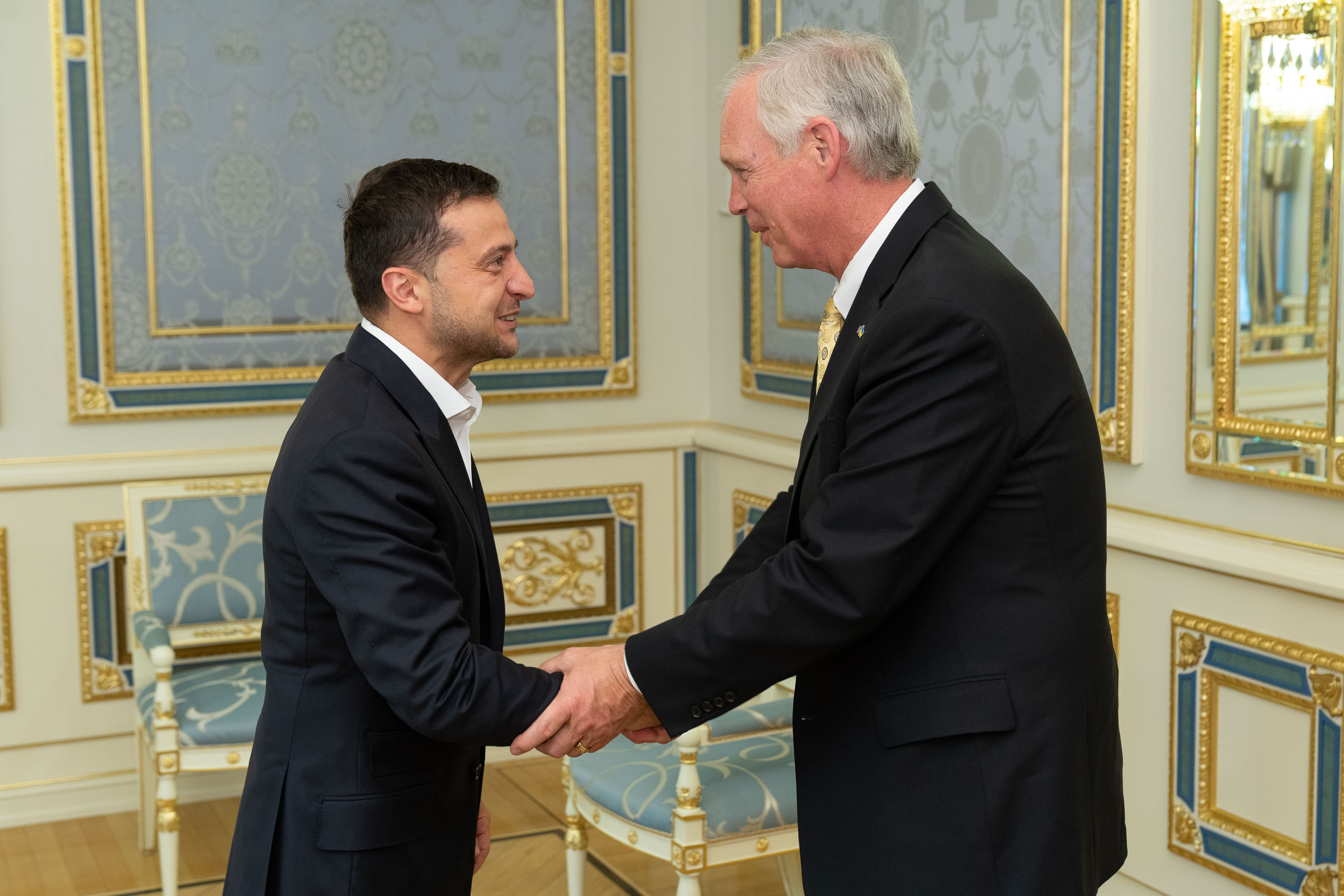
Johnson meeting Ukrainian president Volodymyr Zelenskyy in 2019

In 2019, Trump was impeached over allegations that he had frozen aid to Ukraine to pressure the Ukrainian government to announce investigations into whether Ukraine had interfered in the 2016 presidential election and whether Joe Biden had interfered in an investigation involving his son, although the claims had already been found to be false. Johnson called the impeachment an attempt to sabotage the Trump administration, singling out Lieutenant Colonel Alex Vindman for testifying against Trump, and co-sponsored a resolution to condemn the impeachment inquiry.

Johnson was heavily involved with Ukraine–United States relations due to his positions as vice chair of the Senate Ukraine Caucus and chair of the Foreign Relations Subcommittee on Europe and Regional Security. He had been involved in discussions of aid to Ukraine and tried to dissuade Trump from freezing it. Johnson reported that he "winced" when he learned from ambassador Gordon Sondland that the freeze was tied to the request for investigations, but he accepted Trump's denial of the allegation. Johnson had also spoken to former Ukrainian diplomat Andrii Telizhenko, who alleged that the Ukrainian government interfered in the election by cooperating with the investigation into Trump's 2016 campaign chairman Paul Manafort. Johnson endorsed the prospect of investigations into Biden's activity in Ukraine and China so long as the investigation did not involve pressuring a foreign government.

Johnson chose not to recuse himself from the impeachment hearing despite his close involvement, saying his recusal would prevent Wisconsin's citizens from having an equal say in the result. He offered to testify, which raised questions about the protocol of a senator providing testimony and then voting based on that testimony. He also provided a statement to House Republicans detailing his involvement. Johnson ultimately voted against having witnesses testify at all.

Johnson voted to acquit Trump because the impeachment resolution did not accuse him of a crime. He dismissed the United States Government Accountability Office's decision that Trump broke the law, saying its findings were a political dispute between the executive and legislative branches of government.

==== COVID-19 pandemic ====
During the COVID-19 pandemic, Johnson rejected the accepted medical understanding of COVID-19 and its treatment. He expressed support for the COVID-19 vaccine but said its importance was overstated. He spread false claims about potential dangers of the vaccine, citing user-submitted reports of the Vaccine Adverse Event Reporting System to say thousands of people had been killed by the COVID-19 vaccine despite the Centers for Disease Control and Prevention finding evidence that only three deaths might have been caused by the vaccine out of 245 million doses; Johnson's communications advisor later walked back the claim. He opposed the use of vaccine passports to document vaccination and a provision in the 2022 defense bill that mandated the discharge of servicemen if they did not receive the COVID-19 vaccine.

Johnson accused the media of hiding alternative treatments to COVID-19 such as hydroxychloroquine and ivermectin, which were found to be ineffective. He brought several witnesses before the Committee on Homeland Security and Governmental Affairs to testify against the medical consensus, including Jane Orient, who disputed the vaccine's efficacy, and Ramin Oskoui, who falsely said that face masks, quarantining, and social distancing are ineffective in reducing spread of the virus. YouTube suspended Johnson from the platform for seven days after he uploaded a video touting unproven treatments for COVID-19. He was also critical of preventative measures like lockdowns and face masks, encouraging caution in imposing limitations that could affect essential functions while acknowledging that distancing measures were important in flattening the curve.

Johnson opposed the spending increases implemented during the pandemic, including the Paycheck Protection Program, though he voted for the CARES Act stimulus program. When the Senate considered a Biden-backed stimulus bill—the third since the pandemic began—Johnson invoked a procedural stalling tactic requiring the bill to be read in its entirety in the Senate chamber, which remained mostly empty during the reading. He opposed extending the pandemic's higher unemployment benefits in 2021 out of concern that it would create a perverse incentive to keep people from working.

In August 2026, Johnson and Rand Paul disclosed private communications exchanged via government-issued mobile devices between senior officials in the health sector, specifically referencing discussions about COVID-19 vaccination during pregnancy. According to the disclosed text messages, in January 2021 Fauci expressed apprehension about a potential correlation between the second dose of the COVID-19 vaccine and early pregnancy miscarriages. He shared his reservations with CDC Director Rochelle Walensky and US Surgeon General Vivek Murthy. Fauci emphasized that there was no empirical evidence to substantiate that vaccination timing during pregnancy (i.e., early or late) is critical, and clarified that the COVID-19 vaccine is not a "genetic" vaccine, thereby alleviating concern about its impact on fetal development when administered early in pregnancy. The disparity between Fauci's public statements about the vaccine's safety for pregnant women and his private concerns has contributed uncertainty about the issue. Johnson's office contends that the discrepancy between Fauci's private text messages and his subsequent public statements has significant implications for informed consent. The senators' release of the text messages also raised questions about the formatting and organization of the phone's contact list. Specifically, it was noted that only three of the phone's 34,000 text messages and 522 voicemails were saved with names, while the remainder were identified solely by phone number. In this context, Johnson expressed concerns about the thoroughness of the record-keeping, saying that his staff could not guarantee the preservation of all messages.

==== 2020 presidential election and January 6 attack ====
In the lead-up to the 2020 presidential election, Johnson declined to say whether he would recognize the results as legitimate, and said the supporters of whoever lost would reject the results. He warned that Democrats would riot if Biden lost but said Republicans would not riot if Trump lost. He also accused the Democratic Party of misconduct for implementing more lenient policies for postal voting and drop-off voting.

After Biden won, Johnson planned on objecting to the electoral results. He withdrew his objections to certifying the results after Trump supporters attacked the Capitol Building during the election certification on January 6, 2021. Johnson argued the attack was not a significant threat to the Senate's safety and said he would have been be more afraid if Black Lives Matter or Antifa had been at the Capitol, saying he knew Trump supporters and they never "would have done what the rioters did"; this prompted accusations of racism. He accused the FBI of knowing about the attack before it occurred and claimed without evidence that it had been provoked as a false flag attack. Although police radio confirmed that people were armed, Johnson argued that it was not an "armed insurrection" because no weapons were seized. Johnson opposed the second impeachment of Donald Trump that accused Trump of causing the attack, saying impeachment would merely "inflame the situation".

Despite voting to certify the election, Johnson continued to spread disproved claims about widespread election fraud and sought investigation into the allegations, saying there was "voter fraud that the mainstream media and, unfortunately, many officials just simply ignore" and that Democrats had "gamed the system" in Wisconsin. In private, Johnson said he knew Biden had won legitimately, and he eventually recognized Biden's victory publicly. He walked back his claims of voter fraud, saying it was not widespread enough to invalidate Biden's victory. Of his investigations, he said his intention was to investigate irregularities and not to overturn the election.

In May 2021, Johnson voted against creating the January 6 commission to investigate the attack. Andrew Hitt, the chair of the Republican Party of Wisconsin in 2021, testified to Congress that Johnson had suggested submitting electoral votes for Trump despite Biden's victory in Wisconsin. Johnson defended his involvement as limited to only a few seconds when he introduced his staff to one of Trump's lawyers.

The House January 6th Committee revealed that Johnson's aide Sean Riley texted Chris Hodgson, an aide to Vice President Mike Pence, to request that Johnson personally give Pence an envelope containing fraudulent alternate electors for Michigan and Wisconsin. Hodgson refused. In 2023, the FBI collected phone records of Johnson and eight other Republicans documenting the times and recipients of their calls on January 4–7, 2021, to investigate their involvement in the plot to submit fake electors and overturn Biden's victory. Johnson decried this as inappropriate surveillance by the Biden administration.

=== 2022 Senate election ===
Final results by county in 2022: Ron Johnson: 70–80%; 60–70%; 50–60%; Mandela Barnes: 70–80%; 50–60%

Johnson had pledged to serve only two terms, but he announced his candidacy for a third in 2022, saying there were calls for him to run and that he needed to stay in the Senate because "America is in peril". Before announcing his reelection campaign, he had been considered a possible candidate for governor of Wisconsin. Johnson won the Republican primary for the Senate with 84% percent of the vote to David Schroeder's 16%.

In 2022, Johnson was the only incumbent Republican nominee for the Senate competing in a state that Trump lost in the 2020 presidential election. The Democratic nominee was Lieutenant Governor of Wisconsin Mandela Barnes, a member of the Democratic Party's progressive faction. Johnson said Barnes was too extreme and presented himself as more moderate, while the Barnes campaign described Johnson as a Washington insider. Johnson's campaign used the election of Raphael Warnock, another black senatorial candidate whose Republican opponent called him too progressive, as an example to avoid.

Cultural issues were a major aspect of Johnson's 2022 campaign, and he frequently criticized anti-white racism and cancel culture. He also made crime a major issue, taking a law and order stance. Barnes accused Johnson of taking advantage of fear about crime without helping communities in a way that would solve the problem.

Johnson was reelected with 50% of the vote to Barnes's 49%, a much smaller margin than expected based on polling. No other Republican won a statewide race in Wisconsin in 2022.

=== Third term (2023–present) ===
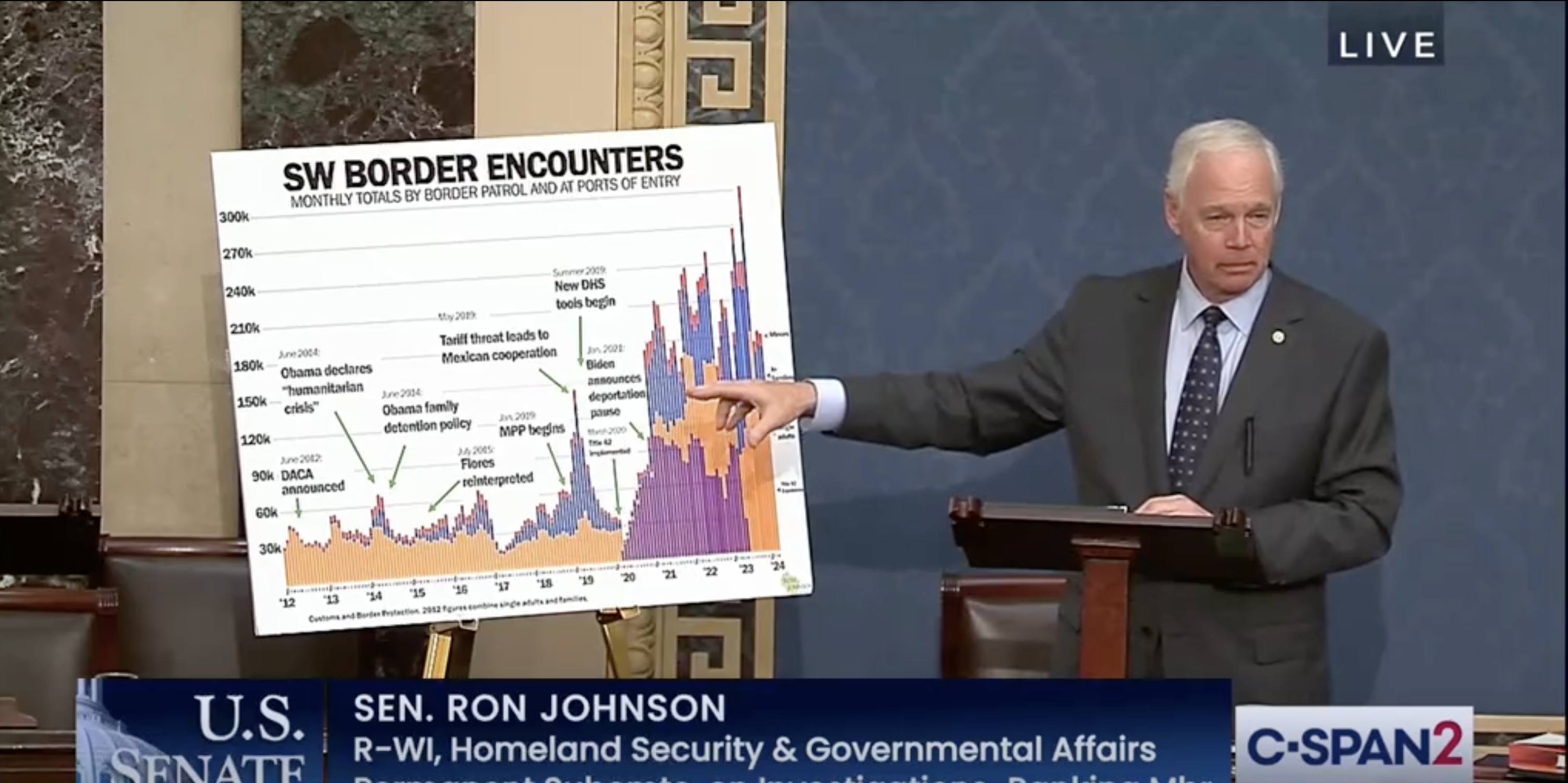
Johnson speaking on the Senate floor in 2024

Leading up to the 2024 presidential election, Johnson was unwilling to say he would accept the result, saying he wanted to but would "have to see exactly what happens". After Trump won, Johnson made anti-corruption a major priority, alleging that federal agencies intended to sabotage Trump and were under the control of businesses. He also used his position as chair of the Senate Permanent Subcommittee on Investigations to open investigations based on 9/11 conspiracy theories. Johnson was one of the strongest supporters of Robert F. Kennedy Jr.'s nomination as Secretary of Health and Human Services, and expressed interested in working with Kennedy on reevaluating the use of vaccines and investigating processed food.

In 2025, Johnson said he did not want to run for reelection in 2028 but had yet to make a final decision.

=== Committee assignments ===
As of the 119th United States Congress, Johnson has served on the following committees.

- United States Senate Committee on Appropriations (112th Congress)
- Committee on the Budget (112th–119th Congress)
- Committee on Homeland Security and Governmental Affairs (112th–119th Congress; chairman during 114th–116th Congress)
- Special Committee on Aging (112th and 119th Congress)
- United States Senate Committee on Banking, Housing, and Urban Affairs (113th Congress)
- Committee on Commerce, Science, and Transportation (113th–117th Congress)
- Committee on Foreign Relations (113th–117th Congress)
- Committee on Small Business and Entrepreneurship (113th Congress)
- Committee on Finance (119th Congress)

== Political positions ==
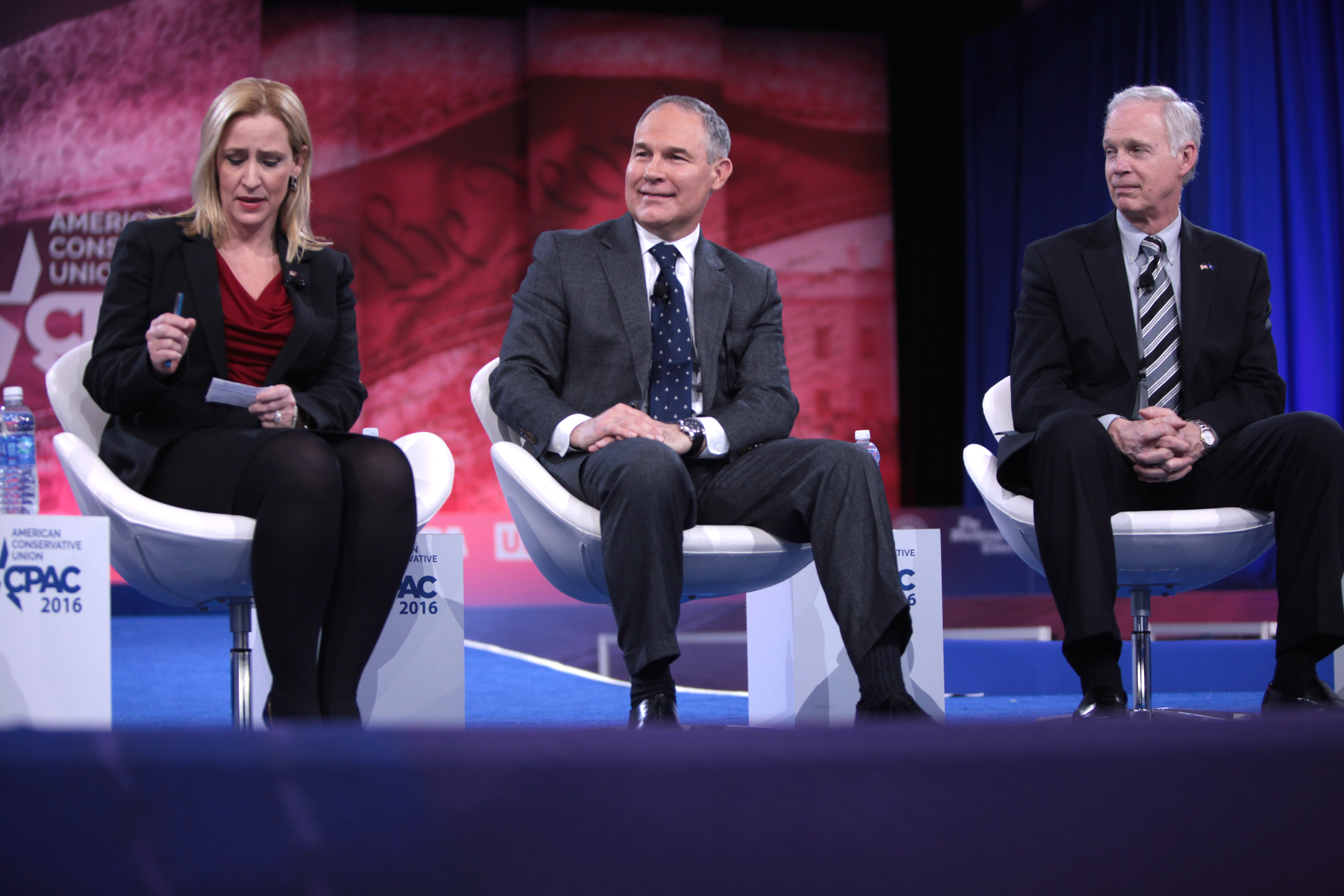
Johnson (right) at the Conservative Political Action Conference with Leslie Rutledge and Scott Pruitt

Johnson has a conservative Senate voting record and is among Trump's closest Congressional allies. He considers both Trump and himself "change agent[s]". Johnson has acknowledged that the Tea Party movement was a major factor in his political rise but said he did not consider himself a member of the movement and has not joined any Tea Party organizations, though he has called himself "more Tea Party than Republican". His fellow senator from Wisconsin, Tammy Baldwin, is a Democrat who diverges drastically from Johnson in ideology. Senators from the same state are typically more closely aligned. Johnson has cited Ayn Rand's novel Atlas Shrugged as a major influence on his ideology.

Johnson is known for inviting controversy and making statements that attract media attention. He has promoted conspiracy theories on a variety of issues, which he says is a way to raise uncomfortable questions, allow people to consider alternative ideas, and hold the media accountable. He argues that "conspiracy theorist" is a label used to silence people who "want to expose the truth". Many of his remarks have received media attention as gaffes, including his accusation that The Lego Movie is anti-capitalist and his comment that public school students are "idiot inner-city kids".

Johnson's supporters have praised him for taking a direct, blunt approach to politics and support him as an anti-establishment politician. Critics see him as taking advantage of conspiracy theories to retain the support of Trump's voters. As his tenure in the Senate has lengthened, his opponents have begun to portray him as an out-of-touch Washington insider rather than an anti-establishment candidate, which Johnson has called "lies and distortions".

=== Crime ===
Johnson has said that the prevalence of single-parent households and resulting lack of father figures is a driving force of criminal activity. He opposes criminal justice reforms that he sees as incentivizing crime, including the abolition of cash bail, restrictions on police chases, and dropping charges for low-level offenders. He has said Wisconsin's criminal justice system has a "revolving door policy" in which criminals are released shortly after arrest and then commit further crimes. He has also expressed concern about the Ferguson effect, whereby police have become more hesitant to stop crime because any action puts them under increased scrutiny. Johnson is critical of the defund the police movement, which he called "dispiriting".

Johnson has accused the FBI of corruption, alleging it tried to sabotage and discredit him, and opened investigations into multiple FBI officials through his position on the Committee of Homeland Security and Governmental Affairs. He aligned with the Catholic Church in opposing Wisconsin's 2010 Child Victims Act because it made it easier to sue organizations associated with sexual abusers, which he said would penalize innocent parties and disincentivize organizations from reporting abuse.

=== Economic and fiscal issues ===
Opposition to government spending and support for a balanced budget are central to Johnson's political platform. He says reducing spending is the best way to reduce the deficit. He has called high taxes "punishing success" and objects to raising taxes as a means to pay off the national debt. Johnson is critical of the Social Security program, calling it a Ponzi scheme. He has called for reforms like partial privatization, tying it to assets other than government bonds and making it subject to regular renewal by Congress. He argues that programs like Social Security and Medicare are threatened by the deficit and that he is trying to save them by reducing spending.

Johnson opposed the budget cut plan Paul Ryan proposed in 2011 because he felt the budget needed to be cut even further, and he stalled a bill authorizing military action in Libya in protest of the budget. In 2014, Johnson was one of three senators to oppose an increase in funding to the Department of Veterans Affairs, which he said passed too quickly without consideration of offsetting the expenses.

To decide what spending to cut, Johnson has proposed auditing each budget item individually to find wasteful funds that go to what he has called "grifters who are sucking down the waste, fraud and abuse". Defending cuts in spending, Johnson said Congress cannot "defeat the deep state by funding it". He has proposed eliminating government shutdowns by allowing the government to continue operating on the previous budget if a new budget is not passed. Johnson supports infrastructure spending but has expressed reservations about funding it with deficit spending. He considers deregulation a path to economic growth.

In 2016, Johnson said he would support a small increase to the national minimum wage if it were tied to inflation, and in 2021 he expressed support for "increasing the minimum wage to some extent". In 2022, he said it was better for the marketplace to decide wages than to have a government-mandated minimum wage. Johnson opposes requiring companies to provide paid family leave, arguing that they would offset the costs by halting increases in wages and benefits, though in 2015 he voted for an amendment to establish a deficit-neutral reserve fund to allow all employees in the country to earn paid sick time.

In 2024, Johnson was one of 18 senators who voted against a third budget extension to prevent a government shutdown because he wanted to avoid indefinite extensions without passing a full budget. Johnson was skeptical of the One Big Beautiful Bill Act in 2025 because it did not offset its tax cuts by reducing spending. He described the bill's $1.5 trillion spending cuts over ten years as nothing more than "a rounding error" and called for a $6 trillion cut to return spending to where it was before the COVID-19 pandemic. He voted for the bill after Trump assured him that spending would be reduced.

Johnson opposes new programs to make higher education affordable, saying in 2016 that "we already have 38 different programs that lower payments". He is critical of regulations on electronic cigarettes and flavored tobacco on the grounds that those products help people stop using cigarettes, and he sought the assistance of political strategist Mark Block to court users and sellers of electronic cigarettes when campaigning. In 2025, Johnson opposed a 10-year moratorium on artificial intelligence regulations because the issue was too complex to make such a decision and the correct amount of regulation remained unclear.

==== Trade ====
During Johnson's first Senate campaign, he described free trade favorably as "creative destruction" and said that offshoring jobs would eventually create new ones in the U.S. He opposes tariffs, which he considers "taxes on American consumers". He opposed Trump's use of tariffs and has supported restrictions on the president's ability to implement them, though he accepts the use of tariffs as leverage against other countries and agreed to a tariff on Mexico in 2019 on the condition that it be used to negotiate the construction of the Mexico–United States border wall.

Johnson has sought the creation of trade deals that provide access to foreign markets, citing their importance in Wisconsin's agriculture and manufacturing industries. Describing trade at the time, he said, "the last thing we want to do is engage in trade wars". He voted to grant the president Trade Promotion Authority in 2015 and to establish the United States–Mexico–Canada Agreement in 2020. He did not take a position on whether the U.S. should enter the Trans-Pacific Partnership agreement while it was being negotiated in 2016.

=== Environment, climate change, and energy ===
Johnson rejects the scientific consensus on climate change. In his 2010 Senate campaign, he called the understanding that climate change is man-made "lunacy" and said it is "not proven by any stretch of the imagination". He proposed sunspots and "the geologic eons of time" as alternative explanations. In dismissing the effects of climate change, Johnson erroneously claimed that Greenland was green when it was discovered and had become white and snow-clad over time as a result of cooling temperatures. He also disagreed that greenhouse gasses are harmful, saying that they feed trees. He has disputed that he is a climate change denier.

Johnson has supported the oil industry and advocated for increased drilling. He made a statement that suggested support for drilling in the Great Lakes during his 2010 campaign, but later said his words had been misinterpreted. He supported the creation of the Keystone Pipeline. While campaigning in 2022, Johnson said that Democrats were intentionally raising gas prices to force people to use electric vehicles.

=== Foreign policy ===
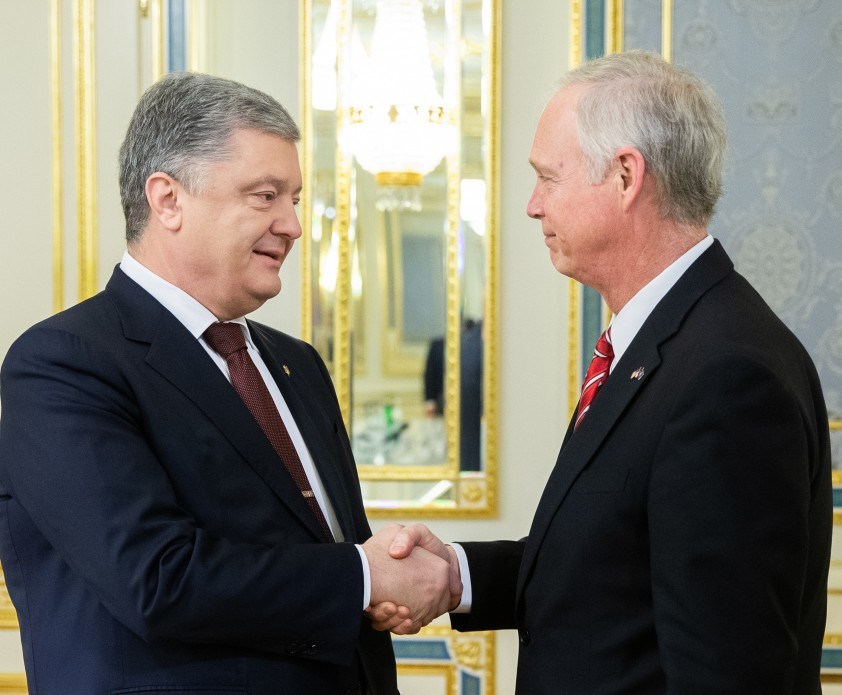
Johnson meets with Ukrainian president Petro Poroshenko in 2018.

Johnson rejects global governance and has accused the United Nations of having corrupt members. He has called for international action on certain issues, such as containment of the Western African Ebola epidemic and prevention of violence against women.

Johnson said he believes Russia is an "adversary" but that dialogue must remain open because "Russia is not going away". He opposed using sanctions against Russia as a response to the country's interference in the 2016 elections and voted against a bill to condemn Trump's handling of sanctions against Russia. In the late 2010s, Johnson was a major advocate of military aid for Ukraine. He attended Ukrainian President Volodymyr Zelenskyy's 2019 inauguration and considered Zelenskyy an ally against Russia. He opposed further aid after Russia invaded Ukraine in 2022, saying that Russia would inevitably win and that further support would be a waste of funds. He said support should be delivered to Ukraine only with a plan to negotiate a settlement with Russia, and joined other Republicans in tying his support for aid to greater border security between the U.S. and Mexico.

Johnson accused the Obama and Biden administrations of making the Middle East more dangerous by taking insufficient measures against Iran, and accused Obama of taking too weak a stance against the Islamic State. Warning that the Islamic State would cause terrorism in the U.S., he advocated its total destruction and called its leaders "barbarians". Johnson opposed increasing U.S. military presence beyond what was already in Iraq and instead proposed a U.S.-led coalition of NATO and Arab states. Johnson voted against ending U.S. military involvement in Yemen in 2018 and supported launching strikes against the Houthis in Yemen in response to their attacks on ships during the Red Sea crisis that began in 2023. He has said wealthy Arab nations should pay the U.S. for the military assistance it provides.

During the Gaza war, Johnson said Israel should be given administrative authority over the Gaza Strip so it could enforce peace. He opposed a ceasefire on the grounds that it risked letting Hamas regroup and opposed aid to Palestine on the grounds that Hamas would seize it. He said Palestinian refugees should go to other Arab nations if they did not want to be under Israeli jurisdiction.

=== Governance ===
Johnson dismissed the idea that the 2016 presidential election would be rigged, but he was a major proponent of such claims for the 2020 election and at one point suggested he might not accept the results of the 2024 election. He supports requiring proof of citizenship when registering to vote and opposes what he argues is excessive use of mail-in voting, saying it reduces confidence in election results. He also opposes the nationalization of federal elections that would take election management away from state governments.

Johnson is one of the Senate Republicans who favored the nuclear option of ending the Senate's filibuster "to speed up consideration of President Trump's nominees" because changing the Senate's rules to a simple majority vote would "ensure a quicker pace on Trump's court picks". He opposed abolishing the filibuster while Republicans held the Senate in 2022 and said those in favor of abolishing it wanted "absolute power". He again supported abolishing the filibuster during a government shutdown in 2025 after Trump called for its removal.

=== Gun policy ===
Johnson opposes gun control measures as infringements of rights granted by the Second Amendment to the United States Constitution and argues that such measures do not necessarily reduce violent crime. He supports the right to concealed carry, and has said increased gun ownership would allow defensive gun use that could deter violent crime. He has called mandatory gun buyback programs "compensated confiscation" and emphasized the importance of due process in implementing red flag laws. He opposes expanded background checks on gun purchases and worked to prevent a background check bill from passing in 2013. He also opposes high-capacity magazine bans. During his 2010 campaign he initially said he was open to firearms licensing, but he later said he had been misunderstood. In April 2013, Johnson was one of 12 Republican senators to sign a letter threatening to filibuster any newly introduced gun control legislation. He responded to school shootings by proposing a school security law and responded to the Uvalde school shooting by saying it was caused by a failure to teach values in schools, a remark Governor Tony Evers called "breathtaking".

=== Health care and medicine ===
Johnson's early political career focused heavily on opposition to the ACA, which he cited as his reason for entering politics. He supported the Republican strategy of "repeal and replace" when other Senate Republicans considered a partial repeal. He has also criticized the subsequent Medicaid expansions, which he said allowed "legalized fraud" in the benefits it provided for unemployed able-bodied adults.

Johnson supports health care protections for people with preexisting conditions and has presented his daughter's congenital heart defect as an example. He expressed willingness to keep the ACA provision that offers these protections and proposed a reform so they would function through high-risk pools. He alleged that the ACA caused higher insurance premiums for people with preexisting conditions.

Johnson has accused health agencies like the Department of Health and Human Services, the Centers for Disease Control and Prevention, and the Food and Drug Administration of being nontransparent and hiding information from Congress. He indicated support for the disproven claim that there is a link between vaccines and autism and has called sanitation the best way to eradicate disease, suggesting vaccines play only a supplementary role. He supports repealing vaccine requirements for children attending school. Johnson has endorsed the false claim that the bleaching agent chlorine dioxide can treat several conditions. During the COVID-19 pandemic, he promoted skepticism of the COVID-19 vaccine and supported alternative treatments that were found to be ineffective. He sponsored a federal right-to-try law allowing patients with severe illness to try experimental treatments.

==== Abortion ====
In 2011, Johnson co-sponsored a federal bill that would grant all fetuses the rights of personhood, with no exceptions for rape or incest. From 2013 to 2021, he supported bills that banned abortion after 20 weeks of conception except in cases of incest, rape, or risk to the mother's life.

In 2021, Johnson supported a request for the Supreme Court to uphold a Mississippi law banning abortion after 15 weeks, with exceptions for "severe fetal abnormality" or medical emergency but none for rape and incest. He supported Dobbs v. Jackson Women's Health Organization, the 2022 U.S. Supreme Court ruling that overturned Roe v. Wade, and the subsequent legalization of abortion bans. Johnson said he did not see that decision "as a huge threat to women's health" and suggested that those who did not like it could move out of Wisconsin.

Johnson has said an abortion ban after 12 weeks is a "reasonable position that most Americans agree with", comparing it to similar bans in European countries, but has warned Republicans that infighting on specific abortion cutoffs would let Democrats win on the issue and result in looser abortion restrictions. He proposed holding a referendum in Wisconsin to determine when voters believe a fetus should be protected. Governor Tony Evers convened a special session of the Wisconsin State Legislature to establish citizen ballot initiatives, but Johnson accused him of doing this to politicize the situation.

Johnson opposes funding research that uses embryonic stem cells, saying he disagrees with it morally and that eliminating funding for the research would help balance the federal budget. He supports the promotion of contraceptives.

=== Immigration ===
In 2017, Johnson supported the end of Deferred Action for Childhood Arrivals (DACA), which provided protections for illegal immigrants brought to the U.S. as children, saying it was unconstitutional and "created incentives for children from Central America to take great risks to enter America illegally". He has called on state and local governments to arrest illegal immigrants who commit violent crimes and deliver them to the custody of Immigration and Customs Enforcement (ICE). He is critical of sanctuary cities that give protections to illegal immigrants. Johnson supports a safe third country agreement with Mexico on the grounds that people seeking asylum will stop there instead of continuing to the U.S. Johnson has promoted the Great Replacement conspiracy theory, a white supremacist belief that there are efforts to replace white populations with nonwhite populations.

Johnson supported the raids led by ICE during Trump's second administration. He accused Democrats of encouraging people to interfere with ICE operations and of "neutering our ability to enforce any immigration laws" when they demanded that ICE get judicial warrants before entering people's homes. Johnson argued that killings during immigration operations by ICE should be investigated but that opposition was overstated because most operations were conducted properly, and that there were fewer victims of immigration operations than victims of crimes committed by undocumented immigrants. He opposed a reduction in spending on the Department of Homeland Security because he saw any cuts as a continuation of the defund the police movement.

=== National security ===
Johnson expressed support for the Patriot Act while campaigning in 2010. He voted to ban mass collection of data by the National Security Agency. Johnson used his position on the Committee on Homeland Security and Governmental Affairs to prevent the passage of cyber-security regulation, saying it gave the government too much control over businesses. He objected when Biden terminated the China Initiative anti-espionage program, which was criticized for racial discrimination, and insinuated without evidence that it was to help Hunter Biden engage in business in China.

Johnson has expressed belief in 9/11 conspiracy theories and alleged that information about the attack has been covered up. He endorsed the debunked claim that 7 World Trade Center was destroyed by controlled demolition and said the National Institute of Standards and Technology investigation that disproved the claim was corrupt.

=== Same-sex marriage and gender identity ===
Johnson has said marriage is "between one man and one woman" but has also said he does not oppose protections for same-sex couples. In 2015, he was one of the few Republicans who voted to allow same-sex spouses to have access to federal Social Security and veterans' benefits. In July 2022, he initially expressed support for the Respect for Marriage Act, which would codify same-sex marriage into federal law, but he reversed his stance in September 2022. Johnson also voted against the Employment Non-Discrimination Act.

Johnson opposed the Biden administration's application of the sex discrimination protections under Title IX to include protection of gender identity, saying that it was taking "a sledgehammer to Title IX". He supports banning transgender students from competing on sports teams that do not align with their gender at birth.

== Personal life ==
Johnson lives in Oshkosh, Wisconsin. He has been married to Jane Curler, whom he met while attending Edina High School, since 1977. They have three children, and as of 2024 they have four grandchildren. He is a member of the Wisconsin Evangelical Lutheran Synod and has attributed his deeply held religious beliefs to his parents. He engages in philanthropy, including donations to the Boys & Girls Clubs of America, Catholic schools, and individuals in need. He is also involved with the faith-based Joseph Project jobs program.

== Electoral history ==
Wisconsin U.S. Senate Republican primary 2010
Party	Candidate	Votes	%
Republican	Ron Johnson	500,925	84.7%
Republican	Dave Westlake	61,303	10.4%
Republican	Stephen Finn	29,005	4.9%

Wisconsin U.S. Senate election 2010
Party	Candidate	Votes	%
Republican	Ron Johnson	1,125,999	51.86%
Democratic	Russ Feingold (incumbent)	1,020,958	47.02%
Republican gain from Democratic			

Wisconsin U.S. Senate Republican primary 2016
Party	Candidate	Votes	%
Republican	Ron Johnson (incumbent)	248,754	99.5%

Wisconsin U.S. Senate election 2016
Party	Candidate	Votes	%
Republican	Ron Johnson (incumbent)	1,479,262	50.2%
Democratic	Russ Feingold	1,380,496	46.8%
Libertarian	Phil Anderson	87,531	3.0%
Republican hold			

Wisconsin U.S. Senate Republican primary 2022
Party	Candidate	Votes	%
Republican	Ron Johnson (incumbent)	563,227	83.7
Republican	David Schroeder	109,748	16.3

Wisconsin U.S. Senate election 2022
Party	Candidate	Votes	%
Republican	Ron Johnson (incumbent)	1,337,185	50.4%
Democratic	Mandela Barnes	1,310,467	49.4%
Republican hold			

== Works cited ==
- Brattebo, Douglas M. (2018). "Wisconsin Senate Race: Stunning Upset in the Badger State". In Foreman, Sean D.; Godwin, Marcia L. (eds.). The Roads to Congress 2016: American Elections in a Divided Landscape (1st ed.). Palgrave Macmillan. pp. 373–388. ISBN 978-3-319-58094-4.
- Canon, David T. (2012). "Feingold vs. Johnson in Wisconsin's Senate Race: The Maverick Icon Meets His Match". In Adkins, Randall E.; Dulio, David A. (eds.). Cases in Congressional Campaigns: Riding the Wave (2nd ed.). Routledge. pp. 201–218. ISBN 978-0-415-89516-3.
- Cohen, Richard E.; Barnes, James A. (2015). The Almanac of American Politics 2016. Columbia Books & Information Services. ISBN 978-1-938518-30-0.
- Cohen, Richard; Barnes, James A. (2017). The Almanac of American Politics 2018. Columbia Books & Information Services. ISBN 978-1-938939-58-7.
- Cohen, Richard; Cook, Charlie (2019). The Almanac of American Politics 2020. Columbia Books & Information Services. ISBN 978-1-938939-88-4.
- Cohen, Richard; Cook, Charlie (2021). The Almanac of American Politics 2022. Columbia Books & Information Services. ISBN 978-1-952374-09-8.
- Cohen, Richard (2023). The Almanac of American Politics 2024. Columbia Books & Information Services. ISBN 978-1-952374-18-0.
- Davidson, Roger H.; Oleszek, Walter J.; Lee, Frances E. (2012). Congress and Its Members (13th ed.). SAGE. ISBN 978-1-60871-642-5.
- Peterson, Geoffrey (2012). "Ron Johnson: The Accidental Tea Partier". In Bullock, Charles S. (ed.). Key States, High Stakes: Sarah Palin, the Tea Party, and the 2010 Elections. Rowman & Littlefield Publishers. pp. 91–100. ISBN 978-1-4422-1095-0.
- Sherman, Jake; Palmer, Anna (2019). The Hill to Die On: The Battle for Congress and the Future of Trump's America. Crown Publishing Group. ISBN 978-0-525-57474-3.

Party political offices
Preceded by Tim Michels	Republican nominee for U.S. Senator from Wisconsin (Class 3); 2010, 2016, 2022	Most recent
U.S. Senate
Preceded by Russ Feingold	United States Senator (Class 3) from Wisconsin; 2011–present Served alongside: Herb Kohl, Tammy Baldwin	Incumbent
Preceded by Tom Carper	Chair of the Senate Homeland Security Committee; 2015–2021	Succeeded by Gary Peters
Preceded by Lindsey Graham	Chair of the Senate Budget Committee; 2026–present	Incumbent
U.S. order of precedence (ceremonial)
Preceded by John Boozman	Order of precedence of the United States as United States Senator	Succeeded by Jerry Moran
Preceded by John Hoeven	United States senators by seniority 29th	Succeeded by Rand Paul
