= The Almanac of American Politics =

Reference book

- Author: Richard E. Cohen, James A. Barnes, Charlie Cook, Michael Barone
- Language: English
- Subject: Politics of the United States
- Genre: Reference book
- Published: Biennially from 1972 through 2024; most recently in 2024
- Publisher: Columbia Books & Information Services, Ballotpedia
- Publication place: United States
- ISBN: 978-1938518294
- Website: www.thealmanacofamericanpolitics.com

The Almanac of American Politics is a reference work published biennially by Columbia Books & Information Services. It aims to provide a detailed look at the politics of the United States through an approach of profiling individual leaders and areas of the country. The first edition of the Almanac was published in 1972. The National Journal published biennial editions of the Almanac from 1984 through 2014. In 2015, Columbia Books & Information Services became the publisher.

== Overview ==
The Almanac is broken down alphabetically by state, with each congressional district in each state profiled separately. The information provided by the Almanac includes:

- Demographic information on each district, including income, racial distribution, and other statistics.
- Profiles of the Congressional representative from each district as well as each state's Senators, including voting record on key votes, advocacy group ratings, etc.; profiles of governors are also included.
- Individually written profiles of each district, commissioned for the Almanac.
- In-depth profiles of every governor, Senator, and House member.
- Analysis of elections for Senate, House and governor races, and how those results shape the public policy debates in Congress and the nation.
- A breakdown of the votes cast in the last U.S. presidential election for all states and districts, including primaries.
- Campaign finance data on spending by all members of the U.S. Congress in their most recent election, including all-new listings of the "outside money" spent in those contests.
- Analysis of voter turnout in each state and congressional district for the last presidential and mid-term elections.
- More than 60 state and congressional district maps, the key votes cast by members of the House and Senate, and interest group ratings.

In addition, an overview look at each state is given, including prospects for the upcoming presidential election and demographic trends.

The 2014 and 2012 editions of the Almanac are both 1,838 pages long. The Almanac was first published in 1971; subsequent editions have appeared biennially since 1973. The main editors were originally Michael Barone, now a writer at the Washington Examiner; Grant Ujifusa; and Douglas Matthews. Matthews stopped contributing after the 1980 edition. Barone and Chuck McCutcheon authored the 2012 edition, and were joined by Sean Trende and Josh Kraushaar for the 2014 edition. The co-authors of the 2016 edition are Barone, Richard E. Cohen, Charlie Cook, and James A. Barnes.

== Authors ==
External videos
- Washington Journal interview with Michael Barone on The Almanac of American Politics, August 20, 1999, C-SPAN
- Washington Journal interview with Barone on Almanac, August 3, 2001, C-SPAN
- Presentation by Barone, Richard E. Cohen, and Charles Mahtesian on Almanac, October 10, 2003, C-SPAN
- Presentation by Barone on Almanac, December 12, 2007, C-SPAN
- Presentation by Barone on Almanac, September 16, 2009, C-SPAN

Richard E. Cohen co-authored The Almanac of American Politics from 2001 through 2010, and again in 2016. He has written about Congress for National Journal, Politico and Congressional Quarterly. He is the author of Washington at Work: Back Rooms and Clean Air, a case study of the 1990 Clean Air Act, and Rostenkowski: The Pursuit of Power and the End of the Old Politics. He co-authored The Partisan Divide with former Reps. Tom Davis of Virginia and Martin Frost of Texas. In 1990, he won the Everett McKinley Dirksen Award for distinguished reporting on Congress.

James A. Barnes is a senior writer for Ballotpedia and consultant to CNN, projecting the outcomes of presidential, congressional and gubernatorial races for its election night and primary night coverage. He was formerly the chief political correspondent for National Journal magazine and founder of the National Journal Insiders Poll. He is co-author of Public Opinion among Political Elites: The Insiders Poll as a Research Toll in The Forum: A Journal of Applied Research in Contemporary Politics (2013), and a contributor to The State of American Politics (Rowman & Littlefield, 2001).

Charlie Cook is editor and publisher of the Cook Political Report and a political analyst for National Journal, where he writes a twice weekly column. In 2010, Cook was a co-recipient of the American Political Science Association's Carey McWilliams award to honor "a major journalistic contribution to our understanding of politics." For the spring semester of 2013, Cook served as a Resident Fellow at the Institute of Politics at Harvard Kennedy School at Harvard University.

Barone is Senior Political Analyst for the Washington Examiner and a Resident Fellow at the American Enterprise Institute. He is a contributor to Fox News Channel and co-author of The Almanac of American Politics 1972-2016. He is also the author of Our Country: The Shaping of America from Roosevelt to Reagan, The New Americans: How the Melting Pot Can Work Again, and a number of other publications. Barone received the Bradley Prize from the Lynde and Harry Bradley Foundation in 2010, the Barbara Olsen Award from The American Spectator in 2006 and the Carey McWilliams Award from the American Political Science Association in 1992.

The 2004, 2006, 2008, and 2010 editions were authored by Barone and Richard E. Cohen, the congressional correspondent for the National Journal, and edited by Charles Mahtesian.
