= Luke and Alex Safety Act =

School safety bill in the 117th Congress

Luke and Alex School Safety Act of 2021
- Long title: To establish the Federal Clearinghouse on School Safety Best Practices, and for other purposes.
- Enacted by: the 117th United States Congress

Legislative history
- Introduced in the Senate as S. 111 by Ron Johnson (R–WI)

The Luke and Alex School Safety Act of 2021 is a United States bill introduced in the 117th Congress on 28 January 2021 by Republican Senator Ron Johnson (R-WI) and co-sponsored by Senators Marco Rubio, Rick Scott, James Risch, and Chuck Grassley, as a measure to improve school safety and help prevent mass shootings. The corresponding House bill is H.R.750, introduced 3 February 2021 by representative Mario Díaz-Balart.

== Legislative history ==
The bill, named for two victims of the 2018 Parkland high school shooting—Alex Schachter and Luke Hoyer, would establish a database within the Department of Homeland Security, a "Federal Clearinghouse" for "School Safety Best Practices". The bill was described by Politico as "a modest school safety bill", and other sources noted that the clearinghouse already exists, and the bill would only codify it into law. The bill would reportedly require the Department of Homeland Security to collect feedback and other data on the best practices for improving the health, safety and welfare of those in school settings.

The bill was brought to a vote on the floor on 26 May 2022, in the wake of the Robb Elementary School shooting, but was blocked by Democratic senators who objected to it for not being "a sufficient solution", and one that would not have prevented the Robb school shooting.

== Reception ==
Senator Majority Leader Chuck Schumer (D-NY) claimed the bill would do nothing substantial and lacked the necessary teeth to prevent another shooting pointing to the fact that guards and police had already been stationed at Robb Elementary prior to the shooter arriving. Schumer also claimed that the American population were tired of moments of silence, kind words and thoughts and prayers, before choosing to use the Domestic Terrorism Prevention Act to begin considering gun safety amendments.

The father of Schacter expressed outrage at the lack of movement on the bill after the Robb Elementary School shooting, stating that it was heartbreaking that after four years from his son's death Congress has done nothing to save American lives. He later discussed the bill and the EAGLES Act, which reauthorizes the National Threat Assessment Center within the US Secret Service, while testifying before Congress on June 15.
