= Columbia Books & Information Services =

American publishing company

- Founded: 1974
- Country of origin: United States
- Headquarters location: Arlington, Virginia
- Publication types: The Almanac of American Politics
- Nonfiction topics: United States politics
- Official website: www.columbiabooks.com

Columbia Books & Information Services (CBIS) is an American company that serves as a publisher of reference works, online databases, and mailing lists. It was founded in 1974 and is based in Bethesda, Maryland. CBIS provides users with compliance resources and training, print directories, online databases, and customized data delivery.

== History ==
In September 2009, CBIS acquired Association TRENDS, the resource for senior association and non-profit organization executives, formerly owned by Martineau Corporation. On August 30, 2013, CBIS acquired Thompson Information Services from Thompson Media Group, LLC.

== Print directories ==
Print directories published by CBIS include the Washington Representatives Directory, which is a print directory of government relations professionals, lobbying firms, and organizations with a lobbying presence in the Washington, D.C., area. The website Lobbyists.info is an online version with searchable databases of Washington Representatives.

CBIS also published National Trade and Professional Associations, a print directory of associations and executives, and the National Directory of Corporate Public Affairs, a print directory of key public affairs executives in America's largest companies. It includes details of nearly 2,600 corporations that employ a federal lobbyist. Other details include: number of employees, Standard Industrial Classification and North American Industry Classification System codes, ticker symbols and names and contact information of key executives.

The Original US Congress Handbook, which profiles all members of the United States Congress with biographical data, contact information for members including address, phone, fax, committee assignments and staff members, is another publication of CBIS.

In 2015, Columbia Books & Information Services began publishing The Almanac of American Politics, a reference work that provides a detailed look at the politics of the United States through encyclopedic biographical histories with statistic and data compilations.

== Online databases ==
As the world has become increasingly digital, CBIS likewise took its traditional print directories online with a series of subscription databases.

AssociationExecs.com is contains detailed profiles of trade and professional associations and their staff, featuring over 20,000 association profiles and over 180,000 staff executives.

Lobbyists.info, re-branded under Washington Representatives in 2019, contains profiles and data related to the government relations industry, including full lobbying disclosure details since 2010 and profiles for over 70,000 client and firms, and 40,000 government relations professionals.

TheGrantscape.com, powered by Thompson Grants, is a comprehensive database of federal, state, local, and private grant opportunities for the grant-seeking community. Grantscape features over 7,000 active grant opportunities, reflecting over $25 million in funding.

== Training and events ==
CBIS hosts many live and virtual conferences and events throughout the year, primarily under its brands Association TRENDS and Thompson Grants. These events are geared at bringing the respective industries together for insight, guided learning, and networking opportunities. Association TRENDS events include:

- Salute to Association Excellence
- Nonprofit Finance Summit
- Learnapalooza
- Nonprofit CFO of the Year
- AMS Fest
- Emergent
- Nonprofit Finance Innovators Network

Thompson Grants events include:

- Federal Grants Forum For Experienced Grant Recipients
  - DC
  - Pittsburg
  - Dallas
