= Charlie Cook =

American political analyst (born 1953)

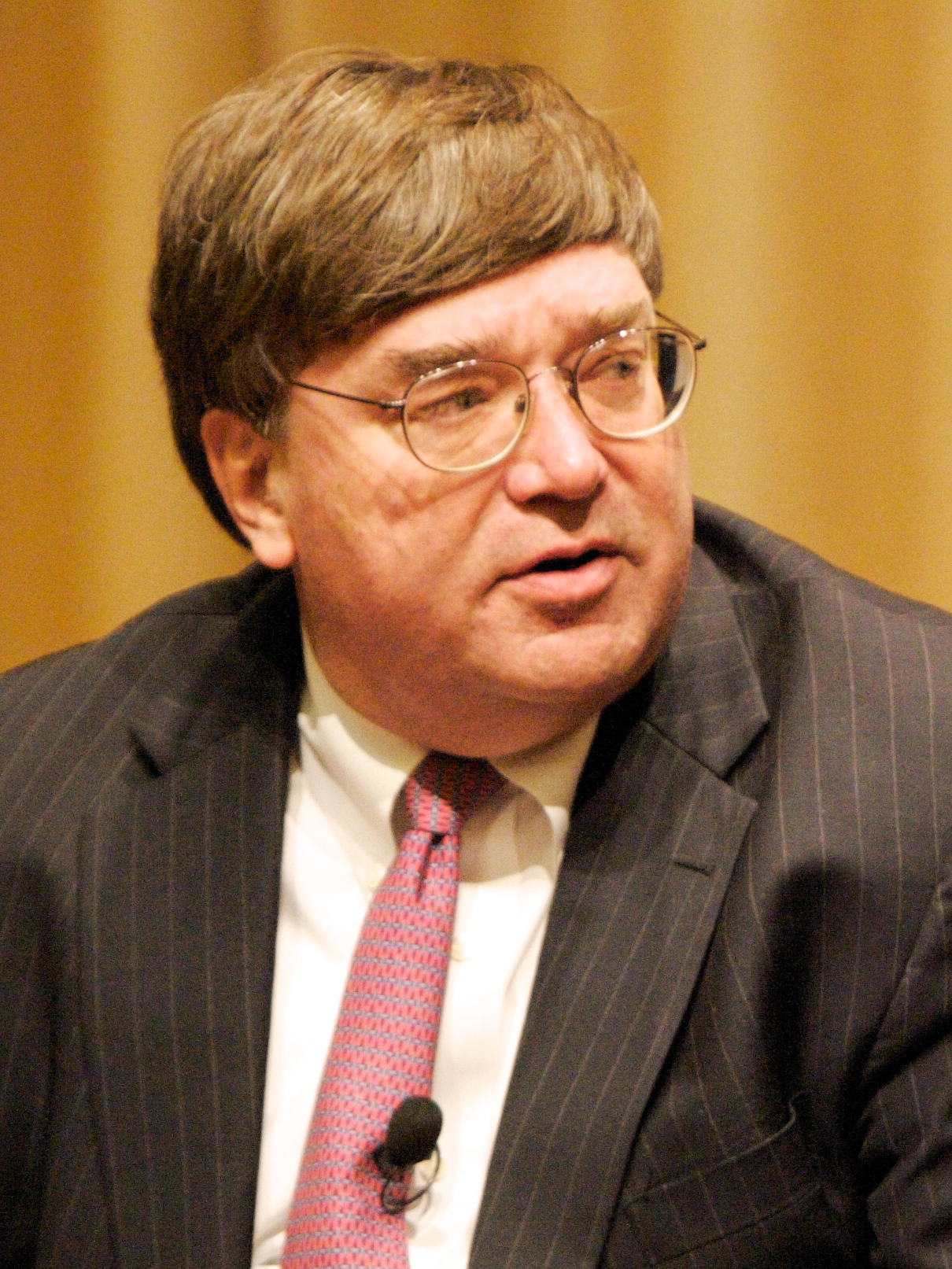
- Cook in 2010
- Born: Charles Edward Cook Jr. November 20, 1953 (age 72); Shreveport, Louisiana, U.S.
- Education: Georgetown University (BA)
- Occupation: Political analyst
- Known for: The Cook Political Report, Cook Partisan Voting Index
- Spouse: Lucy Cook (m. 1982)

Charles Edward Cook Jr. (born November 20, 1953) is an American political analyst. Specializing in election forecasts and political trends, Cook writes election forecasts and rankings in the publication he founded, The Cook Political Report, and in other media. Since the 1984 US presidential election, Cook has provided election night commentary for various television networks. In 1997, Cook started producing the Cook Partisan Voting Index. A political analyst for the National Journal and NBC, Cook writes two columns for National Journal. In 2013, he was a resident fellow at the Harvard Institute of Politics.

== Early life and education ==
Cook is the son of Mary Hudgens Cook and Charles Cook Sr. (Magnolia, Arkansas 1916–2012). His father was a highly decorated officer in the United States Army Air Force during World War II, and an electrical engineering graduate from the University of Arkansas. He has two sisters, Carole and Margaret, and a brother, Robert. Cook graduated in 1972 from Captain Shreve High School in Shreveport and attended Georgetown University in Washington, DC.

== Career ==
In 1984, Cook founded the newsletter The Cook Political Report, which publishes analyses of the primaries and general elections for federal political offices and state governorships. The Report's predictions are accorded high credibility among journalists and politicians. Since the 1984 US presidential election, Cook has provided election night commentary for various television networks.

In 1994 he became a political analyst for NBC, and he has also provided political analysis for the National Journal. Cook writes two columns for the latter: "The Cook Report" for the main publication and "Off to the Races" for the online National Journal Congress Daily.

In 1997, Cook started producing the Cook Partisan Voting Index, a scoring metric of partisan lean in Congressional districts and states, which is still published biannually today and is frequently referenced in political commentary.

In 2006, Cook was inducted into the Louisiana Political Museum and Hall of Fame in Winnfield. In 2010, he won the Carey McWilliams award from the American Political Science Association. The award is given annually to honor a major journalistic contribution to our understanding of politics and carries a prize of $750.

In 2013, he served as a Resident Fellow at the Harvard Institute of Politics.

Leading up to the 2020 presidential election, Cook criticized poll aggregates and models such as RealClearPolitics and FiveThirtyEight, saying that there are "limitations" to aggregation. His critique was cited in The New York Times.

In 2021, Amy Walter took over Cook's roles as editor and publisher of the since-renamed Cook Political Report with Amy Walter. He will continue to write columns and analysis for the newsletter as well as for the National Journal.

== Personal life ==
Cook and his wife Lucy live in Chevy Chase, Maryland.

== See also ==
- List of speakers at The Economic Club of Washington, D.C.
