= Richard E. Cohen =

American journalist and author

Richard E. Cohen is a journalist and author. He is a congressional correspondent for Politico.

== Awards and honors ==
He received the Everett McKinley Dirksen Award for distinguished reporting on Congress in 1990.

== Works ==
External videos
- Booknotes interview with Cohen on Rostenkowski: The Pursuit of Power and the End of the Old Politics, September 19, 1999, C-SPAN

He wrote a biography of Dan Rostenkowski, Rostenkowski: The Pursuit of Power and the End of the Old Politics.
