= List of female governors in the United States =

Map of U.S. states and territories based on whether their governors are male or female as of November 2026. Male Female

As of 2026, 53 women have served as governor of a U.S. state, four as governor of an unincorporated U.S. territory, and two as mayor of the District of Columbia. In January 2026, women have been serving as governor in 14 U.S. states, as mayor of the District of Columbia, and as territorial governors of Guam and Puerto Rico. Of the current female state governors, ten are Democrats and four are Republicans. Madeleine Kunin is the oldest living former female governor at 93.

== Demographics ==
As of 2026, Alabama, Arizona, Connecticut, New Hampshire, New Jersey, and New Mexico are the only states to have elected women as governors from both major parties. Arizona was the first state where a woman followed another woman as governor (they were from different parties). Arizona has also had the most with five, and is the first state to have three consecutive women to serve as governor.

A record 14 out of 50 state governorships were held by women following Mikie Sherrill's inauguration as the Governor of New Jersey on January 20, 2026. This record of 14 was briefly matched for less than two weeks in January 2025 following the inauguration of Kelly Ayotte of New Hampshire on January 9 but prior to the departure of Bethany Hall-Long of Delaware on January 21.

Also, 15 states have never elected a female governor: California, Colorado, Florida, Idaho, Illinois, Indiana, Maryland, Mississippi, Missouri, Nevada, North Dakota, Pennsylvania, Utah, West Virginia, and Wisconsin. Two states (Mississippi and Utah) have never seen a major party nominate a woman in a gubernatorial election, although one woman, Olene Walker, had assumed the office of Governor of Utah from 2003 to 2005 after the previous governor, Mike Leavitt, resigned.

== History ==
The number of female governors every U.S. state and territory has had as of November 2026. Gray denotes 0. 1 2 3 4 5

The first woman to act as governor was Carolyn B. Shelton, who served as Acting Governor of Oregon for one weekend from 9 a.m. on February 27, through 10 a.m. on March 1, 1909. The outgoing governor, George Earle Chamberlain, had been elected to the U.S. Senate and had to leave for Washington, D.C., before his term ended; the incoming governor, Frank W. Benson, had become ill and could not assume office early. Chamberlain left Shelton, his secretary, in charge for the weekend. It was another three and a half years before women were allowed to vote in Oregon. (Note: Chamberlain and Shelton married each other 17 years later.)

The first female acting governor to be entrusted with substantial duties while in office was Soledad Chávez de Chacón, who held the powers and duties of Governor of New Mexico for two weeks while Governor James F. Hinkle attended the 1924 Democratic National Convention in New York. Since Lieutenant Governor José A. Baca had died in May, Chacón, the Secretary of State, filled the position. Her 1924 elevation was the first time in the United States that a woman had assumed the responsibilities of the governor.

The first woman to assume office as governor pursuant to a special election was Nellie Tayloe Ross of Wyoming, who was elected on November 4, 1924, following the death of her husband and former governor, William B. Ross, and was sworn in on January 5, 1925. Wyoming was the first state to provide women's suffrage after New Jersey had abolished it in 1807. Miriam A. Ferguson of Texas won the general election of November 4, 1924, and was sworn in on January 20, 1925. Her husband, former governor James Edward Ferguson, had been impeached and removed from office in 1917. The first woman elected governor who was not the wife or widow of a former state governor was Ella T. Grasso of Connecticut, elected in 1974 and sworn in on January 8, 1975. Kay Ivey of Alabama is the longest-serving female governor in the nation. She is currently serving having been first elected in 2018.

In 1984, Madeleine Kunin was elected as the first female Jewish governor in the U.S. In 2010, Nikki Haley was elected as the first female Asian-American governor in the U.S., and Susana Martinez was elected as the first female Hispanic governor in the U.S. In 2016, Kate Brown, as an openly bisexual woman, became the first openly LGBT person elected governor in the U.S. In 2022, Maura Healey and Tina Kotek became the first openly lesbian women elected governors in the U.S. In 2026, Keisha Lance Bottoms was elected as the first black female governor in the U.S. In the same year, Deb Haaland was elected as the first female Native American governor in the U.S.

=== Histograph ===
Starting	Total	Graph
March 4, 1789	0	
January 5, 1925	1	❚
January 20, 1925	2	❚❚
January 3, 1927	1	❚
January 17, 1927	0	
January 17, 1933	1	❚
January 15, 1935	0	
January 16, 1967	1	❚
May 7, 1968	0	
January 8, 1975	1	❚
January 12, 1977	2	❚❚
December 31, 1980	1	❚
January 14, 1981	0	
December 13, 1983	1	❚
January 10, 1985	2	❚❚
January 9, 1987	3	❚❚❚
December 8, 1987	2	❚❚
April 4, 1988	3	❚❚❚
January 9, 1991	2	❚❚
January 10, 1991	1	❚
January 14, 1991	3	❚❚❚
January 15, 1991	4	❚❚❚❚
March 6, 1991	3	❚❚❚
January 18, 1994	4	❚❚❚❚
January 9, 1995	2	❚❚
January 17, 1995	1	❚
January 9, 1997	2	❚❚
September 5, 1997	3	❚❚❚
December 31, 1998	4	❚❚❚❚
January 11, 1999	3	❚❚❚
January 1, 2001	4	❚❚❚❚
January 3, 2001	5	❚❚❚❚❚
January 31, 2001	4	❚❚❚❚
April 10, 2001	5	❚❚❚❚❚
December 2, 2002	6	❚❚❚❚❚❚
January 1, 2003	7	❚❚❚❚❚❚❚
January 2, 2003	6	❚❚❚❚❚❚
January 9, 2003	5	❚❚❚❚❚
January 13, 2003	6	❚❚❚❚❚❚
November 5, 2003	7	❚❚❚❚❚❚❚
January 12, 2004	8	❚❚❚❚❚❚❚❚
July 1, 2004	9	❚❚❚❚❚❚❚❚❚
January 3, 2005	7	❚❚❚❚❚❚❚
January 12, 2005	8	❚❚❚❚❚❚❚❚
December 4, 2006	9	❚❚❚❚❚❚❚❚❚
January 14, 2008	8	❚❚❚❚❚❚❚❚
January 10, 2009	9	❚❚❚❚❚❚❚❚❚
January 20, 2009	8	❚❚❚❚❚❚❚❚
April 28, 2009	7	❚❚❚❚❚❚❚
July 26, 2009	6	❚❚❚❚❚❚
December 6, 2010	5	❚❚❚❚❚
January 5, 2011	4	❚❚❚❚
January 10, 2011	5	❚❚❚❚❚
January 12, 2011	6	❚❚❚❚❚❚
January 3, 2013	7	❚❚❚❚❚❚❚
January 5, 2013	6	❚❚❚❚❚❚
January 16, 2013	5	❚❚❚❚❚
January 5, 2015	4	❚❚❚❚
January 6, 2015	5	❚❚❚❚❚
February 16, 2015	6	❚❚❚❚❚❚
January 2, 2017	5	❚❚❚❚❚
January 24, 2017	4	❚❚❚❚
April 10, 2017	5	❚❚❚❚❚
May 24, 2017	6	❚❚❚❚❚❚
January 1, 2019	7	❚❚❚❚❚❚❚
January 2, 2019	8	❚❚❚❚❚❚❚❚
January 5, 2019	9	❚❚❚❚❚❚❚❚❚
March 2, 2021	8	❚❚❚❚❚❚❚❚
August 24, 2021	9	❚❚❚❚❚❚❚❚❚
January 2, 2023	10	❚❚❚❚❚❚❚❚❚❚
January 5, 2023	11	❚❚❚❚❚❚❚❚❚❚❚
January 10, 2023	12	❚❚❚❚❚❚❚❚❚❚❚❚
January 7, 2025	13	❚❚❚❚❚❚❚❚❚❚❚❚❚
January 9, 2025	14	❚❚❚❚❚❚❚❚❚❚❚❚❚❚
January 21, 2025	13	❚❚❚❚❚❚❚❚❚❚❚❚❚
January 25, 2025	12	❚❚❚❚❚❚❚❚❚❚❚❚
January 17, 2026	13	❚❚❚❚❚❚❚❚❚❚❚❚❚
January 20, 2026	14	❚❚❚❚❚❚❚❚❚❚❚❚❚❚

== State governors ==
Name (lifespan)	State	Start	End	Duration	Departure	Party	Notes	Ref
Nellie Ross (1876–1977)	Wyoming	January 5, 1925	January 3, 1927	1 year, 363 days	Lost reelection	Democratic	First woman to serve as governor. First woman as Governor of Wyoming. First woman elected in a special election.	
Miriam A. Ferguson (1875–1961)	Texas	January 20, 1925	January 17, 1927	1 year, 362 days	Lost renomination	Democratic	First woman elected Governor of Texas. First woman elected in a general election. First woman to serve non-consecutive terms as Governor.	
Miriam A. Ferguson (1875–1961)	Texas	January 17, 1933	January 15, 1935	1 year, 363 days	Retired	Democratic	First woman elected Governor of Texas. First woman elected in a general election. First woman to serve non-consecutive terms as Governor.	
Lurleen Wallace (1926–1968)	Alabama	January 16, 1967	May 7, 1968	1 year, 112 days	Died in office	Democratic	First woman as Governor of Alabama. First woman to die in office as governor.	
Ella T. Grasso (1919–1981)	Connecticut	January 8, 1975	December 31, 1980	5 years, 358 days	Resigned	Democratic	First woman as Governor of Connecticut. First woman to resign as governor.	
Dixy Lee Ray (1914–1994)	(Washington (state)) Washington	January 12, 1977	January 14, 1981	4 years, 2 days	Lost renomination	Democratic	First woman as Governor of Washington.	
Vesta M. Roy (1925–2002)	New Hampshire	December 29, 1982	January 6, 1983	8 days	Acting governor replaced upon inauguration of a full governor	Republican	First woman as Acting Governor of New Hampshire. Elevated while President of the Senate. Shortest serving female governor.	
Martha Layne Collins (1936–2025)	Kentucky	December 13, 1983	December 8, 1987	3 years, 360 days	Term-limited	Democratic	First woman elected Governor of Kentucky.	
Madeleine Kunin (born 1933)	Vermont	January 10, 1985	January 10, 1991	6 years, 0 days	Retired	Democratic	First woman elected Governor of Vermont. First foreign-born woman as governor.	
Kay A. Orr (born 1939)	Nebraska	January 9, 1987	January 9, 1991	4 years, 0 days	Lost reelection	Republican	First woman as Governor of Nebraska. First woman elected to a governorship over another woman nominated by a major party. First Republican woman elected to a governorship. (Note: Vesta M. Roy served as Acting Governor of New Hampshire from December 29, 1982, to January 6, 1983.)	
Rose Mofford (1922–2016)	Arizona	April 4, 1988	March 6, 1991	2 years, 336 days	Retired	Democratic	First woman as Governor of Arizona. Elevated from Secretary of State.	
Joan Finney (1925–2001)	Kansas	January 14, 1991	January 9, 1995	3 years, 360 days	Retired	Democratic	First woman as Governor of Kansas. First woman to defeat an incumbent governor in a general election.	
Barbara Roberts (born 1936)	Oregon	January 14, 1991	January 9, 1995	3 years, 360 days	Retired	Democratic	First woman elected Governor of Oregon.	
Ann Richards (1933–2006)	Texas	January 15, 1991	January 17, 1995	4 years, 2 days	Lost reelection	Democratic		
Christine Todd Whitman (born 1946)	New Jersey	January 18, 1994	January 31, 2001	7 years, 13 days	Resigned to become EPA Administrator	Republican	First woman elected Governor of New Jersey. First Republican woman to defeat an incumbent governor in a general election.	
Jeanne Shaheen (born 1947)	New Hampshire	January 9, 1997	January 9, 2003	6 years, 0 days	Retired	Democratic	First woman elected Governor of New Hampshire. First woman elected as both Governor and U.S. Senator.	
Jane Dee Hull (1935–2020)	Arizona	September 5, 1997	January 6, 2003	5 years, 123 days	Term-limited	Republican	First woman elected as Governor of Arizona. Elevated from Secretary of State. Later elected in her own right.	
Nancy Hollister (born 1949)	Ohio	December 31, 1998	January 11, 1999	11 days	Term ended	Republican	First woman as Governor of Ohio. Elevated from Lieutenant Governor.	
Judy Martz (1943–2017)	Montana	January 1, 2001	January 3, 2005	4 years, 2 days	Retired	Republican	First woman as Governor of Montana.	
Ruth Ann Minner (1935–2021)	Delaware	January 3, 2001	January 20, 2009	8 years, 17 days	Term-limited	Democratic	First woman as Governor of Delaware.	
Jane Swift (born 1965)	Massachusetts	April 10, 2001	January 2, 2003	1 year, 267 days	Retired	Republican	First woman as Acting Governor of Massachusetts. Elevated to acting governor while Lieutenant Governor. First to give birth while in office.	
Linda Lingle (born 1953)	Hawaii	December 2, 2002	December 6, 2010	8 years, 4 days	Term-limited	Republican	First woman as Governor of Hawaii.	
Jennifer Granholm (born 1959)	Michigan	January 1, 2003	January 1, 2011	8 years, 0 days	Term-limited	Democratic	First woman as Governor of Michigan.	
Janet Napolitano (born 1957)	Arizona	January 6, 2003	January 21, 2009	6 years, 15 days	Resigned to become U.S. Secretary of Homeland Security	Democratic	First woman to succeed another woman governor.	
Kathleen Sebelius (born 1948)	Kansas	January 13, 2003	April 28, 2009	6 years, 105 days	Resigned to become U.S. Secretary of Health and Human Services	Democratic	First governor who is the daughter of a former governor.	
Olene Walker (1930–2015)	Utah	November 5, 2003	January 3, 2005	1 year, 59 days	Lost nomination for full term	Republican	First woman as Governor of Utah. Elevated from Lieutenant Governor.	
Kathleen Blanco (1942–2019)	Louisiana	January 12, 2004	January 14, 2008	4 years, 2 days	Retired	Democratic	First woman as Governor of Louisiana.	
Jodi Rell (1946–2024)	Connecticut	July 1, 2004	January 5, 2011	6 years, 188 days	Retired	Republican	Elevated from Lieutenant Governor. Later elected in her own right.	
Christine Gregoire (born 1947)	(Washington (state)) Washington	January 12, 2005	January 16, 2013	8 years, 4 days	Retired	Democratic		
Sarah Palin (born 1964)	Alaska	December 4, 2006	July 26, 2009	2 years, 234 days	Resigned	Republican	First woman as Governor of Alaska.	
Bev Perdue (born 1947)	North Carolina	January 10, 2009	January 5, 2013	3 years, 361 days	Retired	Democratic	First woman elected Governor of North Carolina.	
Jan Brewer (born 1944)	Arizona	January 21, 2009	January 5, 2015	5 years, 349 days	Retired	Republican	Elevated from Secretary of State. Later elected in her own right.	
Susana Martinez (born 1959)	New Mexico	January 1, 2011	January 1, 2019	8 years, 0 days	Term-limited	Republican	First woman as Governor of New Mexico. First Latina elected to serve as Governor of a U.S. state.	
Mary Fallin (born 1954)	Oklahoma	January 10, 2011	January 14, 2019	8 years, 4 days	Term-limited	Republican	First woman elected Governor of Oklahoma.	
Nikki Haley (born 1972)	South Carolina	January 12, 2011	January 24, 2017	6 years, 12 days	Resigned to become U.S. Ambassador to the United Nations	Republican	First woman as Governor of South Carolina. First Indian American woman serving as governor.	
Maggie Hassan (born 1958)	New Hampshire	January 3, 2013	January 2, 2017	3 years, 365 days	Resigned to become a U.S. Senator	Democratic		
Gina Raimondo (born 1971)	Rhode Island	January 6, 2015	March 2, 2021	6 years, 55 days	Resigned to become U.S. Secretary of Commerce	Democratic	First woman as Governor of Rhode Island.	
Kate Brown (born 1960)	Oregon	February 18, 2015	January 9, 2023	7 years, 325 days	Term-limited	Democratic	First openly bisexual governor and first openly LGBTQ elected governor. Elevated from Secretary of State; later elected in her own right.	
Kay Ivey (born 1944)	Alabama	April 10, 2017	January 16, 2027	9 years, 225 days	Term-limited	Republican	Elevated from Lieutenant Governor. Later elected in her own right. Longest serving female governor.	
Kim Reynolds (born 1959)	Iowa	May 24, 2017	January 12, 2027	9 years, 181 days	Retiring	Republican	First woman as Governor of Iowa. Elevated from Lieutenant Governor. Later elected in her own right.	
Michelle Lujan Grisham (born 1959)	New Mexico	January 1, 2019	January 1, 2027	7 years, 324 days	Term-limited	Democratic		
Gretchen Whitmer (born 1971)	Michigan	January 1, 2019	January 1, 2027	7 years, 324 days	Term-limited	Democratic		
Janet Mills (born 1947)	Maine	January 2, 2019	January 6, 2027	7 years, 323 days	Term-limited	Democratic	First woman as Governor of Maine.	
Kristi Noem (born 1971)	South Dakota	January 5, 2019	January 25, 2025	6 years, 20 days	Resigned to become U.S. Secretary of Homeland Security	Republican	First woman as Governor of South Dakota.	
Laura Kelly (born 1950)	Kansas	January 14, 2019	January 11, 2027	7 years, 311 days	Term-limited	Democratic		
Kathy Hochul (born 1958)	(New York (state)) New York	August 24, 2021	Incumbent	5 years, 89 days	Serving	Democratic	First woman as Governor of New York. Elevated from Lieutenant Governor. Later elected in her own right.	
Katie Hobbs (born 1969)	Arizona	January 2, 2023	Incumbent	3 years, 323 days	Serving	Democratic		
Maura Healey (born 1971)	Massachusetts	January 5, 2023	Incumbent	3 years, 320 days	Serving	Democratic	First woman elected Governor of Massachusetts. First openly lesbian governor.	
Tina Kotek (born 1966)	Oregon	January 9, 2023	Incumbent	3 years, 316 days	Serving	Democratic	First openly LGBTQ governor to succeed another openly LGBTQ governor.	
Sarah Huckabee Sanders (born 1982)	Arkansas	January 10, 2023	Incumbent	3 years, 315 days	Serving	Republican	First woman as Governor of Arkansas. Youngest current governor in the United States; first millennial governor.	
Bethany Hall-Long (born 1963)	Delaware	January 7, 2025	January 21, 2025	14 days	Term ended	Democratic	Elevated from Lieutenant Governor.	
Kelly Ayotte (born 1968)	New Hampshire	January 9, 2025	Incumbent	1 year, 316 days	Serving	Republican		
Abigail Spanberger (born 1979)	Virginia	January 17, 2026	Incumbent	308 days	Serving	Democratic	First woman as Governor of Virginia.	
Mikie Sherrill (born 1972)	New Jersey	January 20, 2026	Incumbent	305 days	Serving	Democratic	First female military veteran to be elected as Governor.	

=== Governors-elect ===
Name (lifespan)	State	Start	End	Duration	Departure	Party	Notes	Ref
Jocelyn Benson (born 1977)	Michigan	January 1, 2027		−41 days	Elect	Democratic		
Deb Haaland (born 1960)	New Mexico	January 1, 2027		−41 days	Elect	Democratic	First Native American woman elected governor of a U.S. state.	
Helena Foulkes (born 1964)	Rhode Island	January 4, 2027		−44 days	Elect	Democratic		
Amy Klobuchar (born 1960)	Minnesota	January 4, 2027		−44 days	Elect	Democratic (DFL)	First woman elected Governor of Minnesota.	
Hannah Pingree (born 1976)	Maine	January 6, 2027		−46 days	Elect	Democratic		
Amy Acton (born 1966)	Ohio	January 11, 2027		−51 days	Elect	Democratic	First woman elected Governor of Ohio.	
Keisha Lance Bottoms (born 1970)	(Georgia (U.S. state)) Georgia	January 11, 2027		−51 days	Elect	Democratic	First Black woman elected governor of a U.S. state. First woman elected Governor of Georgia.	
Cindy Holscher (born 1969)	Kansas	January 11, 2027		−51 days	Elect	Democratic		
Marsha Blackburn (born 1952)	Tennessee	January 16, 2027		−56 days	Elect	Republican	First woman elected Governor of Tennessee.	
Gina Hinojosa (born 1973)	Texas	January 19, 2027		−59 days	Elect	Democratic		

=== Number of female governors per state ===
# of governors	States	# of states
5	Arizona	1
4	New Hampshire, Kansas (1/2027)	2
3	Michigan (1/2027), New Mexico (1/2027), Oregon, Texas (1/2027)	4
2	Alabama, Connecticut, Delaware, Maine (1/2027), Massachusetts, New Jersey, Ohio (1/2027), Rhode Island (1/2027), Washington	9
1	Alaska, Arkansas, Georgia (1/2027), Hawaii, Iowa, Kentucky, Louisiana, Minnesota (1/2027), Montana, Nebraska, New York, North Carolina, Oklahoma, South Carolina, South Dakota, Tennessee (1/2027), Utah, Vermont, Virginia, Wyoming	20
0	California, Colorado, Florida, Idaho, Illinois, Indiana, Maryland, Mississippi, Missouri, Nevada, North Dakota, Pennsylvania, West Virginia, Wisconsin	14

=== Pregnancies ===
Only two sitting governors have given birth while in office, the first was Lieutenant Governor Jane Swift of Massachusetts, who was elevated to acting governor after Paul Cellucci's resignation. Swift was 36 years old and gave birth to twins on May 14, 2001, one month into her tenure. The second governor to give birth in office was Sarah Palin of Alaska, who gave birth to her fifth child on April 18, 2008.

== Territories and the District of Columbia ==
Name (lifespan)	Jurisdiction	Start	End	Departure	Party	Notes
Sharon Pratt (born 1944)	(Washington, D.C.) District of Columbia	January 2, 1991	January 2, 1995	Lost renomination	Democratic	First African American woman elected mayor of a major city. First woman as Mayor of the District of Columbia.
Sila Calderón (born 1942)	Puerto Rico	January 2, 2001	January 2, 2005	Retired	Popular Democratic/ Democratic	First woman as Governor of Puerto Rico. First Hispanic American woman as governor.
Muriel Bowser (born 1972)	(Washington, D.C.) District of Columbia	January 2, 2015	January 2, 2027	Retiring	Democratic	
Lou Leon Guerrero (born 1950)	Guam	January 7, 2019	January 4, 2027	Term-limited	Democratic	First woman as Governor of Guam. First Pacific Islander American woman as governor.
Wanda Vázquez Garced (born 1960)	Puerto Rico	August 7, 2019	January 2, 2021	Lost renomination	New Progressive/ Republican	Elevated from Secretary of Justice when Pedro Pierluisi was removed quo warranto.
Jenniffer González (born 1976)	Puerto Rico	January 2, 2025	Incumbent	Serving	New Progressive/ Republican	
Janeese Lewis George (born 1988)	(Washington, D.C.) District of Columbia	January 2, 2027		Elect	Democratic	
Stacey Plaskett (born 1966)	(United States Virgin Islands) U.S. Virgin Islands	January 4, 2027		Elect	Democratic	First woman as Governor of United States Virgin Islands.

=== Number by party ===
Party	Total number	Number of incumbents
Democratic	4	2
Republican	2	1
Total:	6	3

== Elections with two female major party nominees ==
The first all-woman gubernatorial election was the 1986 Nebraska gubernatorial election, which was also the first time any woman was a major party nominee in Nebraska. This would not happen again until the 2002 Hawaii gubernatorial election, over fifteen years later. The cycle with the most elections with women as both major parties' nominees is 2022 with five. Incumbent governors at the time of the election are listed in bold.

Elections with two female major party nominees
Election year	State	Winner	Second place finisher	Other female candidate(s)	Ref
1986	Nebraska	Kay Orr	Helen Boosalis		
2002	Hawaii	Linda Lingle	Mazie Hirono		
2010	New Mexico	Susana Martinez	Diane Denish		
2010	Oklahoma	Mary Fallin	Jari Askins		
2022	Alabama	**Kay Ivey**	Yolanda Flowers		
2022	Arizona	Katie Hobbs	Kari Lake		
2022	Iowa	**Kim Reynolds**	Deidre DeJear		
2022	Michigan	**Gretchen Whitmer**	Tudor Dixon		
2022	Oregon	Tina Kotek	Christine Drazan	Betsy Johnson	
2024	New Hampshire	Kelly Ayotte	Joyce Craig		
2025	Virginia	Abigail Spanberger	Winsome Earle-Sears		
2026	Minnesota	Amy Klobuchar	Lisa Demuth		
2026	New Hampshire (2)	**Kelly Ayotte**	Cinde Warmington		
2026	Oregon (2)	**Tina Kotek**	Christine Drazan		
2026	Tennessee	Marsha Blackburn	Jerri Green	Lauren Pinkston	

== See also ==
- List of female lieutenant governors in the United States
- List of first gentlemen in the United States
- List of minority governors and lieutenant governors in the United States
