= New Hampshire General Court =

Bicameral legislature of New Hampshire

General Court of New Hampshire

Type
- Type: Bicameral
- Houses: Senate; House of Representatives

Leadership
- Senate President: Sharon Carson (R) since December 4, 2024
- House Speaker: Sherman Packard (R) since January 6, 2021

Structure
- Seats: 424; 24 senators 400 representatives
- Political groups: Republican (16); Democratic (8)
- Political groups: Republican (221); Democratic (177); Independent (1); Vacant (1)

Elections
- Last election: November 5, 2024
- Next election: November 3, 2026

Meeting place
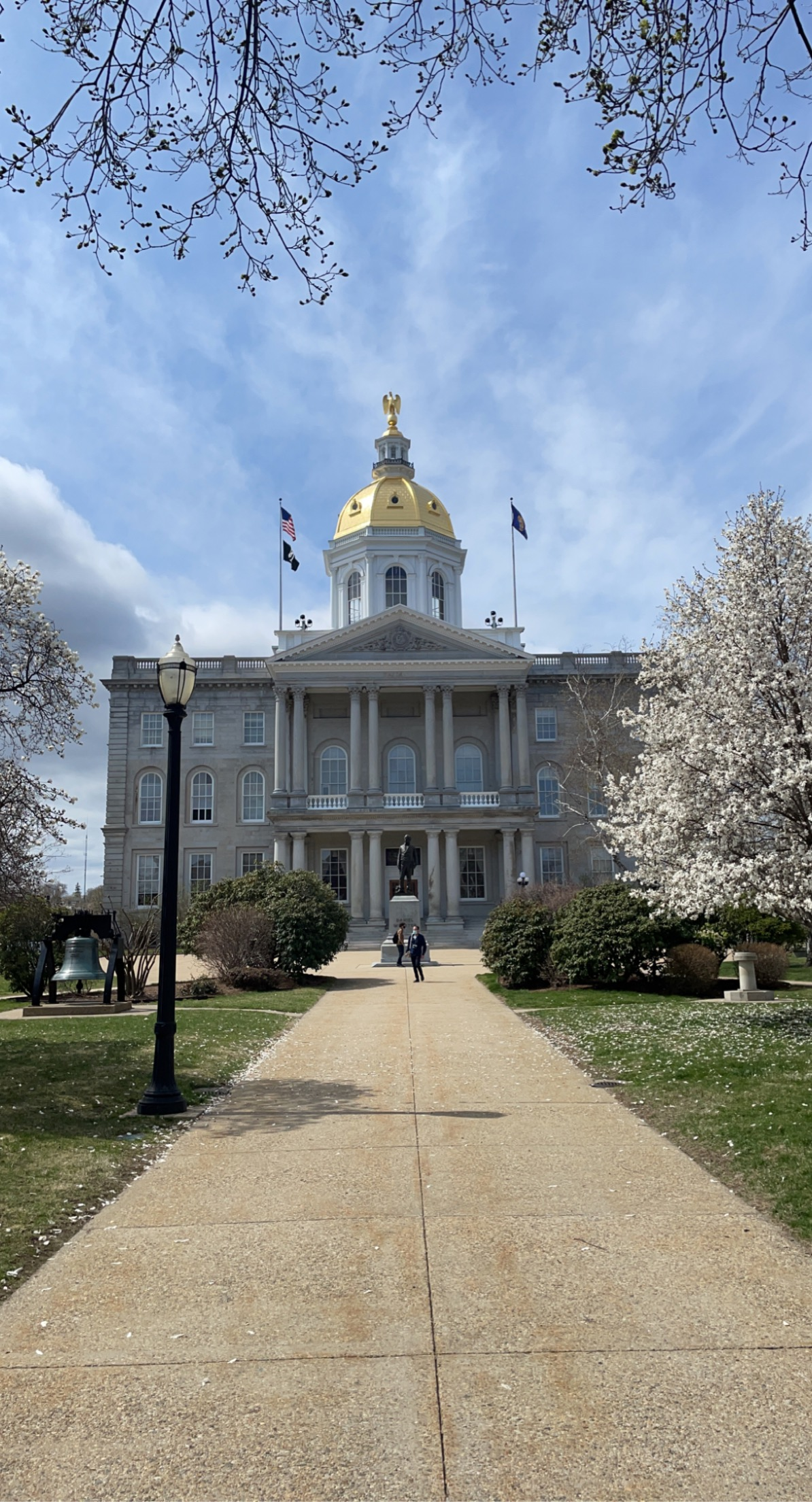
- New Hampshire State House; Concord

Website
- gencourt.state.nh.us

The General Court of New Hampshire is the bicameral state legislature of the U.S. state of New Hampshire. The lower house is the New Hampshire House of Representatives with 400 members, and the upper house is the New Hampshire Senate with 24 members. This ratio of one Senate seat for every 16.67 House seats makes New Hampshire's ratio of upper house to lower house seats the largest in the country.

The General Court convenes in the New Hampshire State House in downtown Concord, opened in 1819. The House of Representatives continues to meet in its original chambers, making Representatives Hall the oldest chamber in the United States still in continuous legislative use.

The annual pay for legislators is set by law at $100.00.

== House of Representatives ==
The House of Representatives consists of 400 members coming from 204 districts across the state created from divisions of the state's counties, each making up about 3,000 residents for every one legislator.

Unlike many legislative chambers, there is no central "aisle" to cross. Instead, there are five sections with aisles between them. Seats are pre-assigned.

=== Composition of the House of Representatives ===
As of January 2025, the composition of the House of Representatives is:

Affiliation	Members
Republican Party	221
Democratic Party	177
Independent	1
Vacant	1
Total	400
Majority	44

== New Hampshire Senate ==
The New Hampshire Senate has been meeting since 1784. It consists of 24 members representing Senate districts based on population. As of the 2025–26 legislative session, there are 16 Republicans and 8 Democrats in the Senate.

=== Composition of the Senate ===
Affiliation	Members
Republican Party	16
Democratic Party	8
Total	24
Majority	8

== Media coverage ==
The New Hampshire State House press covers the New Hampshire State House for newspapers, news services and other news-gathering operations. The New Hampshire General Court website has calendars and journals for both the House and the Senate.

Pew Research Center in 2014 reported New Hampshire had one of the nation's smallest statehouse press corps, with five full-time reporters and an additional nine part-time reporters.

== See also ==
- List of New Hampshire General Courts
