= 2026 New Hampshire elections =

- November 3, 2026

The 2026 New Hampshire elections were held in the state of New Hampshire on November 3, 2026, alongside the nationwide midterm elections. Elections was held for a U.S. Senate seat and governor as well as both of the state's U.S. House of Representatives seats, all 5 seats on the Executive Council of New Hampshire, all 400 seats in the New Hampshire House of Representatives, and all 24 seats in the New Hampshire Senate. Primary elections were held on September 8, 2026.

A swing state, New Hampshire frequently votes for both Republicans and Democrats statewide. Democrats have had more success at the federal level, winning New Hampshire in every presidential election since 2004, controlling both United States Senate seats and both U.S. House seats.

Despite Democratic success in federal races, Republicans have dominated other elections in the state for the past decade. In 2024, Republicans gained a veto-proof supermajority in the State Senate, expanded their majority in the State House, maintained 4-1 control of the Executive Council, and held the governorship despite Kamala Harris winning the state on the presidential level by roughly 3 points.

== Federal ==
=== United States Senate ===
Incumbent Democratic senator Jeanne Shaheen was re-elected with 56.6% of the vote in 2020. She is retiring.

Writer and activist Karishma Manzur, United States representative Chris Pappas, and state representative Jared Sullivan are running in the Democratic primary. Former United States ambassador to New Zealand and former Massachusetts U.S. Senator Scott Brown is running in the Republican primary, as is John E. Sununu, who held this seat from 2003 to 2009.

=== United States House of Representatives ===
Both of New Hampshire's seats in the United States House of Representatives are up for election in 2026. Members of the United States House of Representatives serve two-year terms.

Following the 2024 elections, Democrats control both of the state's U.S. House seats. The state is under pressure by the second Trump administration to redraw the state's congressional maps for 2026, though incumbent Republican governor Kelly Ayotte has publicly opposed such measures.

== State executive ==
=== Governor ===
Incumbent Republican governor Kelly Ayotte was first elected in 2024 with 53.6% of the vote. She is eligible to run for re-election to a second term in office and filed her candidacy for another term.

Corey Lewandowski, a news commentator and former campaign manager for Donald Trump's 2016 presidential campaign, had expressed interest in challenging Ayotte for the Republican nomination.

Former Newmarket town councilor Jon Kiper ran as a Democrat initially, but decided to run as an independent and could not obtain enough signatures to get on the ballot. Former Executive Councillor Cinde Warmington and 2024 Democratic gubernatorial nominee filed to run.

Former state senator and Democratic nominee for governor in 2022, Tom Sherman, had expressed interest in running for the Democratic nomination.

=== Executive Council ===
All 5 seats on the Executive Council of New Hampshire are up for election in 2026. Councilors serve two year terms and are elected alongside the governor.

Following the 2024 elections, Republicans control 4 seats, and Democrats control 1 seat.

== State legislative ==
=== State Senate ===
All 24 seats in the New Hampshire Senate are up for election in 2026. Members serve two year terms.

Following the 2024 elections, Republicans hold a veto-proof supermajority with 16 seats, and Democrats hold 8.

=== State House of Representatives ===
All 400 seats in the New Hampshire House of Representatives are up for election in 2026. Members serve two year terms.

Republicans expanded their majority in the 2024 elections to 222 seats. As of October 2025, Republicans currently hold 217 seats, Democrats hold 177, with two independents. Four seats are vacant.

== See also ==
- Executive Council of New Hampshire
- Governor of New Hampshire
- New Hampshire House of Representatives
- New Hampshire Senate
