= 2026 New Hampshire gubernatorial election =

- November 3, 2026

Nominee	Kelly Ayotte	Cinde Warmington
Party	Republican	Democratic
Popular vote	324,934	297,834
Percentage	51.38%	47.10%
- Ayotte: 50–60% 60–70% Warmington: 40–50% 50–60%
Governor before election
Kelly Ayotte
Republican
Elected Governor
Kelly Ayotte
Republican

The 2026 New Hampshire gubernatorial election was held on November 3, 2026, to elect the governor of the U.S. state of New Hampshire. Incumbent Republican governor Kelly Ayotte defeated Democrat Cinde Warmington, winning re-election to a second two-year term in office.

The primary elections took place on September 8, 2026. Along with neighboring Vermont, it was one of two Republican-held governorships up for election in a state that Kamala Harris won in the 2024 presidential election.

New Hampshire was one of two states to vote for different parties for Senate and governor in 2026, electing a Republican governor and a Democratic senator (Chris Pappas, in the concurrent Senate election). The other one was South Carolina, which also elected a Republican governor (Alan Wilson, in the 2026 South Carolina gubernatorial election), and a Democratic senator (Annie Andrews, in the concurrent Senate election).

== Background ==
New Hampshire has voted Democratic in each presidential race starting in 2004. The state's congressional delegation has been entirely Democratic since 2017. Conversely, Republicans hold a trifecta on the statewide level, with a supermajority in the New Hampshire Senate.

In 2024, Kelly Ayotte won the gubernatorial election by 9.34%.

== Republican primary ==
=== Candidates ===
==== Nominee ====
- Kelly Ayotte, incumbent governor (2025–present)

==== Eliminated in primary ====
- Shaun Fife, farmer and candidate for governor in 2024
- Bob Wayne McClory, welder and candidate for governor in 2024

==== Declined ====
- Dan Innis, state senator (2016–2018, 2022–present), candidate for New Hampshire's 1st congressional district in 2014, and previous candidate for U.S. Senate in 2026 (running for re-election)

=== Endorsements ===
Kelly Ayotte

U.S. representatives

- Jeb Bradley, former NH-01 (2003–2007) and former New Hampshire Senate president (2022–2024) from the 3rd district (2009–2024)

Labor unions

- New England Police Benevolent Association
- Professional Fire Fighters of New Hampshire

Organizations

- Turning Point Action

=== Results ===
Republican primary results
Party	Candidate	Votes	%
Republican	Kelly Ayotte (incumbent)	100,920	91.9
Republican	Shaun Fife	4,418	4.0
Republican	Bob Wayne McClory	3,890	3.5
Write-in		644	0.6
Total votes		109,872	100.0

== Democratic primary ==
=== Candidates ===
==== Nominee ====
- Cinde Warmington, former New Hampshire Executive Councilor (2021–2025) and candidate for governor in 2024

==== Withdrawn ====
- Jon Kiper, former Newmarket town councilor and 2024 gubernatorial candidate (ran as an independent, later withdrew)

==== Declined ====
- Carleigh Beriont, Hampton selectwoman (Running for Congress)
- Donovan Fenton, state senator from the 10th district (2022–present)
- Deaglan McEachern, mayor of Portsmouth (2022–present)
- Andru Volinsky, former New Hampshire Executive Councilor (2017–2021) and candidate for governor in 2020
- Julia Williams, healthcare executive and daughter of former governor John Lynch

=== Endorsements ===
Cinde Warmington

U.S. senators

- Maggie Hassan, New Hampshire (2017–present) and 81st governor of New Hampshire (2013–2017)
- Jeanne Shaheen, New Hampshire (2009–present) and 78th governor of New Hampshire (1997–2003)

U.S. representatives

- Maggie Goodlander, NH-02 (2025–present)
- Chris Pappas, NH-01 (2019–present)

Organizations

- 314 Action
- National Women's Political Caucus
- Planned Parenthood New Hampshire Action Fund
Declined to endorse

Local officials

- Joyce Craig, former mayor of Manchester (2018–2024) and nominee for governor in 2024

=== Polling ===
Poll source	Date(s) administered	Sample size (Note: Key: A – all adults RV – registered voters LV – likely voters V – unclear)	Margin of error	Jon Kiper	Cinde Warmington	Undecided
	April 13, 2026	Kiper switches to run as an Independent				
Saint Anselm College	March 16–18, 2026	691 (RV)	± 3.7%	13%	40%	47%

=== Results ===
Democratic primary results
Party	Candidate	Votes	%
Democratic	Cinde Warmington	126,223	96.4
Write-in		4,788	3.6
Total votes		131,011	100.0

== Third-party and independent candidates ==
=== Candidates ===
==== Declared ====
- Stephen Villee (Libertarian), software developer and nominee for governor in 2024

==== Failed to qualify ====
- Jon Kiper (Independent), former Newmarket town councilor and Democratic candidate for governor in 2024 (Note: Kiper initially announced his candidacy as an independent, but later chose to enter the Democratic primary. In April 2026, he reversed the decision and announced he would continue to run as an independent.)

== General election ==
=== Predictions ===
Source	Ranking	As of
The Cook Political Report	Likely R	October 29, 2026
Decision Desk HQ	Lean R	November 3, 2026
Fox News	Likely R	November 1, 2026
Inside Elections	Solid R	October 29, 2026
NBC News	Likely R	November 3, 2026
RealClearPolitics	Lean R	November 1, 2026
Sabato's Crystal Ball	Lean R	November 2, 2026
Silver Bulletin	Likely R	November 3, 2026

=== Post-primary endorsements ===
Kelly Ayotte (R)

Individuals

- Don Bolduc, retired Army brigadier general and 2022 U.S. Senate nominee

Organizations

- Associated Builders and Contractors of New Hampshire
- Humane World Action Fund
- National Federation of Independent Business
- New Hampshire Home Builders Association
Stephen Villee (L)

Individuals

- Chase Oliver, political activist and Libertarian presidential nominee in 2024
Cinde Warmington (D)

Executive branch officials

- Kamala Harris, former vice president of the United States (2021–2025)
- Barack Obama, 44th president of the United States (2009–2017)

Labor unions

- New Hampshire AFL-CIO
- Teamsters Local 633

Organizations

- EMILYs List

=== Fundraising ===
Campaign finance reports as of October 30, 2026
Candidate	Raised	Spent
Kelly Ayotte (R)	$8,972,271	$8,835,704
Cinde Warmington (D)	$1,769,220	$1,534,066
Source: New Hampshire Campaign Finance System

=== Polling ===
Aggregate polls

Source of poll aggregation	Dates administered	Dates updated	Kelly Ayotte (R)	Cinde Warmington (D)	Other/Undecided (Note: Calculated by taking the difference of 100% and all other candidates combined.)	Margin
270toWin	September 28 – October 20, 2026	October 29, 2026	50.3%	40.5%	9.2%	Ayotte +9.8%
Decision Desk HQ	through October 23, 2026	October 29, 2026	50.7%	41.8%	7.5%	Ayotte +8.9%
FiftyPlusOne	through October 20, 2026	October 29, 2026	50.2%	41.3%	8.5%	Ayotte +8.9%
RealClearPolitics	September 15 – October 23, 2026	October 29, 2026	50.2%	41.4%	8.4%	Ayotte +8.8%
Silver Bulletin	through October 20, 2026	October 29, 2026	51.2%	40.9%	7.9%	Ayotte +10.3%
Average			50.5%	41.2%	8.3%	Ayotte +9.3%

Poll source	Date(s) administered	Sample size	Margin of error	Kelly Ayotte (R)	Cinde Warmington (D)	Other	Undecided
AtlasIntel	October 28 – November 1, 2026	1,057 (LV)	± 3.0%	50%	44%	3% (Note: "Other" with 2%; "Would not vote" with 1%)	4%
University of New Hampshire	October 27–31, 2026	2,040 (LV)	± 2.2%	48%	48%	2% (Note: Stephen Villee (L) with 2%; Another candidate with <1%)	1%
National Public Affairs (R)	October 25–29, 2026	800 (LV)	± 3.5%	52%	43%	3% (Note: Stephen Villee (L) with 3%)	2%
Rasmussen Reports (R)	October 20–23, 2026	970 (LV)	± 3%	52%	42%	2%	4%
Saint Anselm College	October 19–20, 2026	1,672 (LV)	± 2.4%	50%	42%	3%	5%
UMass Lowell/YouGov	October 2–19, 2026	600 (LV)	± 5.0%	48%	42%	3%	7%
National Public Affairs (R)	October 8–12, 2026	600 (LV)	± 4.0%	54%	38%	3% (Note: Stephen Villee (L) with 3%)	5%
YouGov	September 28 – October 5, 2026	1,520 (LV)	± 3.9%	49%	40%	—	11%
Saint Anselm College (Note: Poll sponsored by AARP)	September 28–29, 2026	1,042 (LV)	± 3.0%	52%	45%	2% (Note: "Someone else" with 2%)	1%
The New York Times/Siena University	September 15–22, 2026	613 (LV)	± 4.9%	52%	41%	>1%	6%
University of New Hampshire	September 17–21, 2026	1,418 (LV)	± 2.6%	47%	43%	3% (Note: Stephen Villee (L) with 2%; Another candidate with 1%)	7%
co/efficient (R)	September 9–11, 2026	958 (LV)	± 3.2%	55%	34%	3% (Note: Stephen Villee (L) with 3%)	9%
University of New Hampshire	August 20–24, 2026	1,878 (LV)	± 2.3%	49%	39%	3% (Note: "Write in someone else" with 3%)	9%
Saint Anselm College	August 17–18, 2026	1,411 (LV)	± 2.6%	49%	38%	—	13%
Saint Anselm College	June 24–25, 2026	1,614 (RV)	± 2.4%	45%	37%	—	18%
University of New Hampshire	June 18–23, 2026	2,232 (LV)	± 2.1%	44%	39%	3%	13%
University of New Hampshire	April 17–21, 2026	1,117 (LV)	± 2.9%	47%	39%	4% (Note: "Another candidate" with 4%)	10%
Saint Anselm College	March 16–18, 2026	1,491 (RV)	± 2.5%	46%	39%	—	15%

Hypothetical polling

Kelly Ayotte vs. Jon Kiper

Poll source	Date(s) administered	Sample size	Margin of error	Kelly Ayotte (R)	Jon Kiper (D)	Other	Undecided
	April 13, 2026	Kiper switches to run as an Independent					
Saint Anselm College	March 16–18, 2026	1,491 (RV)	± 2.5%	45%	31%	—	24%
yes. every kid. (D)	January 28–29, 2026	563 (LV)	± 4.1%	47%	37%	—	16%
University of New Hampshire	January 15–19, 2026	2,053 (LV)	± 2.1%	50%	39%	2% (Note: "Another candidate" with 2%)	9%

Kelly Ayotte vs. Deaglan McEachern

Poll source	Date(s) administered	Sample size	Margin of error	Kelly Ayotte (R)	Deaglan McEachern (D)	Other	Undecided
University of New Hampshire	January 15–19, 2026	2,053 (LV)	± 2.1%	49%	41%	0% (Note: "Another candidate" with 0%)	10%

Kelly Ayotte vs. Generic Democrat

Poll source	Date(s) administered	Sample size	Margin of error	Kelly Ayotte (R)	Generic Democrat	Undecided
co/efficient (R)	October 9–13, 2025	1,034 (LV)	± 3.1%	43%	40%	17%

=== Results ===
2026 New Hampshire gubernatorial election
Party	Candidate	Votes	%	±%
Republican	Kelly Ayotte (incumbent)	324,934	51.38	
Democratic	Cinde Warmington	297,834	47.10	
Libertarian	Stephen Villee	9,630	1.52	
Write-in		632,398		
Total votes			100.0	
Republican hold				

== Analysis ==
=== Exit poll ===
2026 New Hampshire gubernatorial election (CNN)
Demographic subgroup	Ayotte	Warmington	% of total vote
Ideology
Conservatives	95	4	32
Moderates	46	52	40
Liberals	10	89	29
Party
Republicans	96	4	29
Democrats	10	89	27
Independents	48	49	44
Donald Trump job approval
Approve	97	2	36
Disapprove	23	75	60
2024 presidential vote
Donald Trump	94	4	42
Kamala Harris	15	84	48
Another candidate	50	35	2
Did not vote	38	55	3
Gender
Men	57	41	48
Women	46	52	54
Income
$100,000 or more	52	46	52
$50,000–$99,999	49	51	30
Less than $50,000	51	46	18
Race/ethnicity
White	51	47	93
All other voters	45	52	7
White born-again or evangelical Christian?
Yes	82	16	15
No	45	53	85
Race by gender
White men	57	42	44
White women	47	52	47
All other voters	45	52	7
Age
18–29 years old	37	61	10
30–44 years old	42	55	19
45–64 years old	58	40	38
65 and older	52	47	33
Area type
Urban	50	49	8
Suburban	48	50	26
Rural	52	46	66
Education
College graduate	43	56	49
No college degree	59	40	51
Education by race
White college graduates	43	56	46
Non-white college graduates	38	58	3
Whites without college	59	39	47
Non-whites without college	52	44	4
Education by gender and race
White women with college degrees	38	61	25
White women without college degrees	56	42	23
White men with college degrees	49	50	21
White men without college degrees	64	35	23
Voters of color	41	56	8
Educational attainment
Advanced degree	38	60	24
Bachelor's degree	48	51	25
Associate's degree	59	40	13
Some college	56	43	18
Never attended college	64	34	20

== See also ==
- 2026 United States Senate election in New Hampshire
- 2026 New Hampshire elections

== Notes ==
Partisan clients
