= Claremont School District v. Governor of New Hampshire =

New Hampshire legal case about school funding

Claremont School District v Governor of New Hampshire is an important legal case in New Hampshire. In the mid-1990s, the city of Claremont, New Hampshire started a process against the State of New Hampshire, challenging the constitutionality of the New Hampshire allocation of school funding.

The Claremont lawsuit was brought on behalf of five school districts that could not afford to properly fund their schools based on local property taxes. This was the second suit of this nature against the State of New Hampshire. The first suit was brought in the early 1980s and was settled when the State agreed to contribute 8% of the cost of education to a fund targeted to aid poor districts. The formula by which the money was distributed was designed by Professor John Augenblick and was called the Augenblick formula.

The State never fully funded its promise and by 1989 Claremont's high school, Stevens High School, had lost its accreditation because the district could not keep up with needed repairs. The then chairman of the Claremont school board, Tom Connair, caused the parties to reinstigate their lawsuit and three lawyers were hired, Arpiar Saunders, John Garvey and Andru Volinsky.

In 1993, the New Hampshire Supreme Court interpreted Part II, Article 83 of the New Hampshire Constitution to guarantee students a right to a public education. In 1997, the New Hampshire school funding system was found unconstitutional and the legislature and governor were ordered to define the components of a constitutionally adequate education, cost them out and pay for them with taxes that were equal across the state. Four governors and their legislatures refused to comply with the Court's orders leading the Supreme Court to again find the school funding system unconstitutional in September, 2006, leading Gov. John Lynch to try, unsuccessfully, to amend the state Constitution.

The Claremont petitioners have been represented since 1995 by John Tobin, Scott Johnson and Andru Volinsky, all of Concord, New Hampshire.
