= 2024 New Hampshire gubernatorial election =

- November 5, 2024
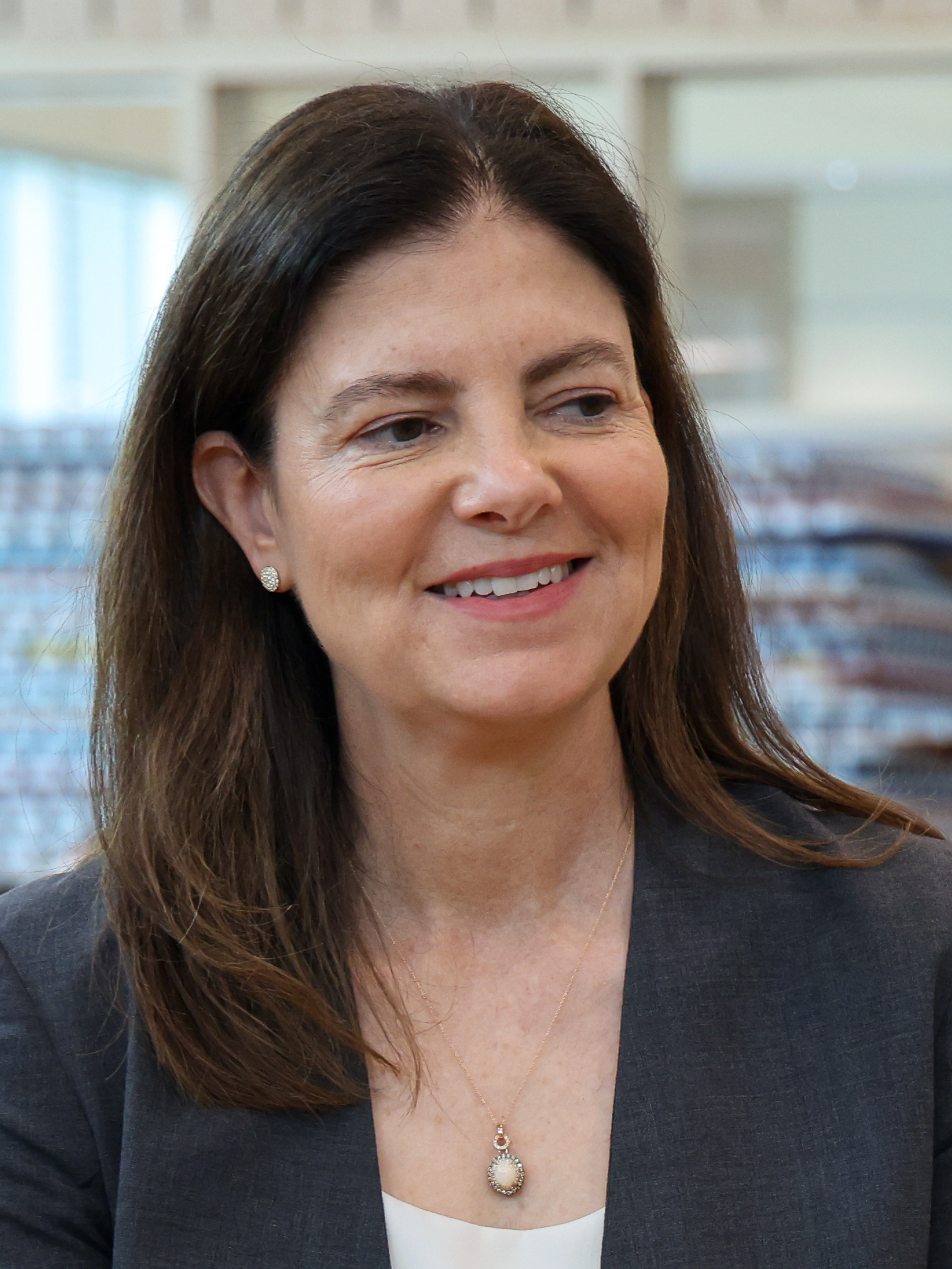

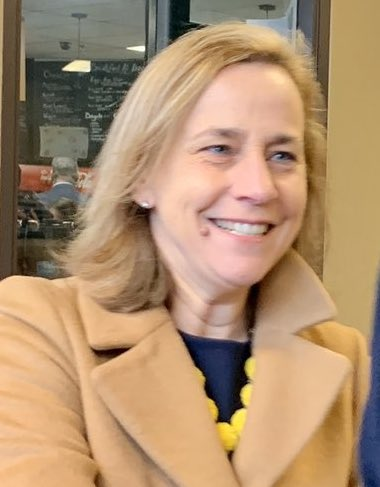
Nominee	Kelly Ayotte	Joyce Craig
Party	Republican	Democratic
Popular vote	436,122	360,149
Percentage	53.61%	44.27%
- Ayotte: 40–50% 50–60% 60–70% 70–80% 80–90% >90% Craig: 40–50% 50–60% 60–70% 70–80% >90% No votes
Governor before election
Chris Sununu
Republican
Elected Governor
Kelly Ayotte
Republican

The 2024 New Hampshire gubernatorial election was held on November 5, 2024 to elect the governor of New Hampshire. Incumbent Republican Gov. Chris Sununu did not seek election to a fifth term.

Primary elections took place on September 10, 2024. Republican former U.S. Senator Kelly Ayotte won the Republican nomination with 63% of the vote over former state senate princess Chuck Morse, and Democratic former Manchester mayor Joyce Craig won the Democratic nomination with 48% of the vote over state executive councilor Cinde Warmington.

Ayotte won the general election, defeating Craig by a 9.34% margin. The election was the closest gubernatorial race for a U.S. state in the 2024 cycle. Along with neighboring Vermont, this race was one of two Republican-held governorships up for election in 2024 in a state Joe Biden won in the 2020 presidential election.

== Background ==
New Hampshire is a Democratic-leaning state in New England with a pattern of split-ticket voting. Incumbent Republican governor Chris Sununu was narrowly elected in 2016 and won re-election in 2018, 2020, and 2022 despite Republican presidential candidate Donald Trump losing the state in both 2016 and 2020. Sununu opted not to seek re-election in 2024.

This race was widely considered a tossup due to the incumbent retiring, the state's pattern of ticket splitting, and the concurrent 2024 presidential election.

== Republican primary ==
=== Candidates ===
==== Nominee ====
- Kelly Ayotte, former U.S. senator (2011–2017)

==== Eliminated in primary ====
- Shaun Fife, farmer
- Robert McClory, welder
- Richard McMenamon, auto repair shop owner and candidate for governor in 2022
- Chuck Morse, former president of the New Hampshire Senate, former acting governor, and candidate for U.S. Senate in 2022
- Frank Staples, transitional living program owner

==== Declined ====
- Jeb Bradley, president of the New Hampshire Senate and former U.S. representative for New Hampshire's 1st congressional district
- Scott Brown, former U.S. ambassador to New Zealand and Samoa (2017–2020), former U.S. senator from Massachusetts (2010–2013), and nominee for U.S. Senate in New Hampshire in 2014
- Frank Edelblut, commissioner of the New Hampshire Department of Education, former state representative, and candidate for governor in 2016
- Chris Sununu, incumbent governor (endorsed Ayotte)

=== Endorsements ===
Kelly Ayotte

U.S. senators

- Judd Gregg, former United States Senator from New Hampshire (1993–2011)

Statewide officials

- Chris Sununu, governor of New Hampshire (2017–2025)

State legislators

- Bill Gannon, state senator from the 23rd district (2016–2018, 2020–present)
- 20 state representatives

Individuals

- Don Bolduc, retired U.S. Army Special Forces brigadier general and nominee for U.S. Senate in 2022
- Rico Petrocelli, Major League Baseball player for the Boston Red Sox

=== Fundraising ===
Campaign finance reports as of September 4, 2024
Candidate	Raised	Spent	Cash on hand
Kelly Ayotte (R)	$7,301,915	$5,499,318	$1,677,858
Chuck Morse (R)	$1,513,599	$1,472,846	$40,753
Source: New Hampshire Campaign Finance System

=== Debates ===
Date	Host	Ayotte	Morse	Link
August 26, 2024	N.H. Institute of Politics	Participant	Participant	YouTube
September 3, 2024	WMUR-TV	Participant	Participant	YouTube

=== Polling ===
Poll source	Date(s) administered	Sample size (Note: Key: A – all adults RV – registered voters LV – likely voters V – unclear)	Margin of error	Kelly Ayotte	Chuck Morse	Undecided
University of New Hampshire	August 15–19, 2024	915 (LV)	± 3.2%	65%	21%	13% (Note: Shaun Fife, Robert McClory, and Richard McMenamon with 0%)
Saint Anselm College	August 13–14, 2024	657 (LV)	± 3.8%	59%	25%	16%
Emerson College (Note: Poll sponsored by WHDH-TV)	July 26–28, 2024	421 (RV)	± 4.7%	41%	26%	33%
Praecones Analytica (Note: Poll sponsored by the NH Journal)	May 15–20, 2024	420 (RV)	± 6.42%	50%	28%	22%
UMass Lowell	January 6–16, 2024	600 (LV)	± 4.65%	54%	22%	23%

Hypothetical polling

Poll source	Date(s) administered	Sample size	Margin of error	Kelly Ayotte	Robert Burns	Frank Edelblut	Chuck Morse	Other	Undecided
Emerson College	August 9–11, 2023	498 (RV)	± 4.9%	45%	3%	4%	9%	3%	35%
co/efficient	June 14–16, 2023	904 (LV)	± 3.25%	69%	–	9%	22%	–	–

=== Results ===
Results by county: Ayotte: 50–60%; 60–70%; 70–80%

Ayotte secured a major victory over Morse, winning almost two thirds of the vote. She performed the best in Sullivan County in the southwest of the state, earning 74% of the vote. Conversely, she recorded her worst result in Rockingham County in the southeast, receiving just 54.7% of the vote.

Republican primary results
Party	Candidate	Votes	%
Republican	Kelly Ayotte	88,117	63.12%
Republican	Chuck Morse	47,567	34.07%
Republican	Shaun Fife	876	0.63%
Write-in		867	0.62%
Republican	Robert McClory	839	0.60%
Republican	Frank Staples	809	0.58%
Republican	Richard McMenamon	527	0.38%
Total votes		139,602	100.00%

== Democratic primary ==
=== Candidates ===
==== Nominee ====
- Joyce Craig, former mayor of Manchester

==== Eliminated in primary ====
- Jon Kiper, former Newmarket town councilor
- Cinde Warmington, New Hampshire executive councilor

==== Declined ====
- Annie Kuster, U.S. representative for New Hampshire's 2nd congressional district
- Steve Marchand, former mayor of Portsmouth and candidate for governor in 2016 and 2018
- Chris Pappas, U.S. representative for New Hampshire's 1st congressional district (ran for re-election)
- Tom Sherman, former state senator and nominee for governor in 2022

=== Endorsements ===
Joyce Craig

Governors

- John Lynch, former governor of New Hampshire (2005–2013)
- Maura Healey, governor of Massachusetts (2023–present)

U.S. representatives

- Chester Atkins, former U.S. representative from MA-5 (1985–1993)

New Hampshire cabinet officials

- Virginia Barry, former commissioner of education (2009–2017)
- James Craig, former commissioner of labor (2013–2017) and former state representative (1998–2006, 2008–2010)
- Colin Van Ostern, former New Hampshire executive councilor from the 2nd district (2013–2017)
- Ned Helms, former commissioner of health and human services (1979–1982)

Judicial officials

- John Broderick Jr., former New Hampshire Supreme Court chief justice (2004–2010)
- Arthur Gajarsa, former U.S. Court of Appeals for the Federal Circuit judge (1997–2011)

State legislators

- 10 current and former state senators
- 69 current and former New Hampshire state representatives

Local officials

- Kevin Cavanaugh, Manchester alderman from the 1st ward (2015–present) and former state senator from the 16th district (2017–2022)
- Jim Donchess, mayor of Nashua (2016–present)

Party officials

- Kathy Sullivan, former chair of the New Hampshire Democratic Party

Other officials

- Paul LeBlanc, Southern New Hampshire University president (2004–2024)
- Susan Lynch, former First Lady of New Hampshire (2005–2013)

Labor unions

- American Federation of Teachers Local 1044
- International Brotherhood of Electrical Workers Local 490
- International Brotherhood of Teamsters Local 633
- New Hampshire Building and Construction Trades Council
Cinde Warmington

Governors

- Howard Dean, former governor of Vermont (1991–2003)

U.S. representatives

- Carol Shea-Porter, former U.S. representative from NH-01 (2007–2011, 2013–2015, 2017–2019)

State officials

- Dudley Dudley, former New Hampshire executive councilor from the 3rd district (1977–1985)

State legislators

- Donovan Fenton, state senator from the 10th district (2022–present)
- Terie Norelli, former speaker of the New Hampshire House of Representatives (2006–2010, 2012–2014) from HD-R26 (1996–2014)
- Suzanne Prentiss, state senator from the 5th district (2020–present)
- Steve Shurtleff, former speaker of the New Hampshire House of Representatives (2018–2020) from HD-M11 (2004–present)
- Becky Whitley, state senator from the 15th district (2020–2024)

Local officials

- Jim Bouley, mayor of Concord (2008–2024)
- Andrew Hosmer, mayor of Laconia (2020–2025)

Labor unions

- SEA/SEIU LOCAL 1984

==== Debates ====
2024 New Hampshire gubernatorial Democratic primary debate
No.	Date	Host	Moderator	Link	Democratic	Democratic	Democratic
Key: P Participant A Absent N Not invited I Invited W Withdrawn							
Key: P Participant A Absent N Not invited I Invited W Withdrawn					Craig	Warmington	Kiper
1	Sep. 4, 2024	WMUR-TV	Adam Sexton	YouTube	P	P	P

=== Fundraising ===
Campaign finance reports as of August 20, 2024
Candidate	Raised	Spent	Cash on hand
Joyce Craig (D)	$2,976,496	$2,630,738	$342,052
Cinde Warmington (D)	$2,287,849	$2,135,285	$152,564
Jon Kiper (D)	$58,277	$55,985	$1,443
Source: New Hampshire Campaign Finance System

=== Polling ===
Poll source	Date(s) administered	Sample size	Margin of error	Joyce Craig	Cinde Warmington	Other	Undecided
University of New Hampshire	August 15–19, 2024	809 (LV)	± 3.4%	39%	30%	8% (Note: Jon Kiper with 8%)	23%
Saint Anselm College	August 13–14, 2024	670 (LV)	± 3.8%	37%	28%	3% (Note: Jon Kiper with 2%; "Someone else" with 1%)	31%
Emerson College	July 26–28, 2024	433 (RV)	± 4.7%	33%	21%	–	44%
GBAO (Note: Poll sponsored by Warmington's campaign)	February 22–26, 2024	600 (LV)	± 4.0%	37%	25%	–	39%
Emerson College	August 9–11, 2023	837 (RV)	± 3.4%	30%	15%	2%	52%

=== Results ===
Results by county Craig: 40–50%; 50–60%; Warmington: 40–50%; 50–60%

Results by municipality Craig: 30–40% 40–50%; 50–60% 60–70% 70–80% 80–90% >90%; Warmington: 30–40% 40–50%; 50–60% 60–70% 70–80% 80–90%; Kiper: 40–50%; Tie: 40–50% No Votes

Democratic primary results
Party	Candidate	Votes	%
Democratic	Joyce Craig	59,976	47.88%
Democratic	Cinde Warmington	52,420	41.85%
Democratic	Jon Kiper	11,789	9.41%
Write-in		1,076	0.86%
Total votes		125,261	100.00%

== Third parties and independent candidates ==
=== Declared ===
- Stephen Villee (Libertarian), software developer

=== Failed to qualify ===
- Edmond LaPlante (Constitution)

== General election ==
=== Predictions ===
Source	Ranking	As of
The Cook Political Report	Tossup	October 15, 2024
Inside Elections	Tossup	September 26, 2024
Sabato's Crystal Ball	Lean R	November 4, 2024
RCP	Tossup	October 1, 2024
Elections Daily	Lean R	November 4, 2024
CNalysis	Tilt R	November 1, 2024

=== Post-primary endorsements ===
Joyce Craig (D)

Organizations

- Democratic Governors Association
- EMILY's List
- Planned Parenthood New Hampshire Action Fund

=== Fundraising ===
Campaign finance reports as of November 5, 2024
Candidate	Raised	Spent	Cash on hand
Kelly Ayotte (R)	$21,005,579	$18,668,848	$2,204,119
Joyce Craig (D)	$7,346,371	$6,827,299	$515,368
Source: New Hampshire Campaign Finance System

=== Polling ===
Aggregate polls

Source of poll aggregation	Dates administered	Dates updated	Kelly Ayotte (R)	Joyce Craig (D)	Undecided (Note: Calculated by taking the difference of 100% and all other candidates combined.)	Margin
RealClearPolitics	October 21 – November 2, 2024	November 3, 2024	46.8%	44.3%	8.9%	Ayotte +2.5%
270toWin	October 24 – November 3, 2024	November 3, 2024	47.0%	44.0%	9.0%	Ayotte +3.0%
Average			46.9%	44.2%	8.9%	Ayotte +2.7%

Poll source	Date(s) administered	Sample size	Margin of error	Kelly Ayotte (R)	Joyce Craig (D)	Others	Undecided
Dartmouth College	November 1–3, 2024	587 (LV)	± 4.0%	40%	58%	2% (Note: "Another Candidate" with 2%)	–
University of New Hampshire	October 29 – November 2, 2024	2,814 (LV)	± 1.9%	48%	44%	1% (Note: Villee (L) with 1%)	6%
Saint Anselm College	October 28–29, 2024	2,791 (LV)	± 1.9%	49%	46%	2% (Note: "Someone else" with 2%)	3%
Praecones Analytica	October 24–26, 2024	622 (RV)	± 3.9%	52%	48%	–	–
Emerson College	October 21–23, 2024	915 (LV)	± 3.2%	50%	46%	5% (Note: Villee (L) with 5%)	–
Emerson College	October 21–23, 2024	915 (LV)	± 3.2%	46%	43%	4% (Note: Villee (L) with 4%)	7%
UMass Lowell/YouGov	October 10–23, 2024	600 (LV)	± 4.4%	45%	43%	4% (Note: Villee (L) with 3%; "Another Candidate" with 1%)	8%
Dartmouth College	October 5–18, 2024	2,196 (RV)	± 2.1%	46%	51%	3% (Note: "Another Candidate" with 3%)	–
UMass Lowell/YouGov	October 2–10, 2024	600 (LV)	± 4.8%	42%	41%	4% (Note: Stephen Ville with 3% and "Another candidate" with 1%)	14%
Saint Anselm College	October 1–2, 2024	2,104 (LV)	± 2.1%	47%	44%	3% (Note: "Someone else" with 3%)	6%
University of New Hampshire	September 12–16, 2024	1,695 (LV)	± 2.4%	46%	47%	1% (Note: "Another candidate" with 1%; Stephen Villee (L) with 0%)	5%
Saint Anselm College	September 11–12, 2024	2,241 (LV)	± 2.1%	46%	43%	5% (Note: Someone else with 5%)	6%
	September 10, 2024	Primary elections held					
Emerson College	November 10–13, 2023	917 (RV)	± 3.3%	43%	40%	—	17%
Emerson College	August 9–11, 2023	837 (RV)	± 3.4%	46%	37%	—	17%

Hypothetical polling

Kelly Ayotte vs. Cinde Warmington

Poll source	Date(s) administered	Sample size	Margin of error	Kelly Ayotte (R)	Cinde Warmington (D)	Undecided
Emerson College	November 10–13, 2023	917 (RV)	± 3.3%	44%	37%	19%
Emerson College	August 9–11, 2023	837 (RV)	± 3.4%	47%	34%	19%

=== Results ===
2024 New Hampshire gubernatorial election
Party	Candidate	Votes	%	±%
Republican	Kelly Ayotte	436,122	53.61%	−3.37%
Democratic	Joyce Craig	360,149	44.27%	+2.80%
Libertarian	Stephen Villee	16,202	1.99%	+0.72%
Write-in		1,024	0.13%	-0.15%
Total votes		813,497	100.00%	N/A
Turnout		832,518		
Registered electors				
Republican hold				

==== By county ====
By county

2024 New Hampshire gubernatorial election results (by county)
County	Kelly Ayotte Republican		Joyce Craig Democratic		Other votes	
	#	%	#	%	#	%
Belknap	24,732	61.41%	14,762	36.65%	781	1.94%
Carroll	19,104	55.93%	14,407	42.18%	647	1.89%
Cheshire	21,342	47.96%	22,107	49.67%	1,055	2.37%
Coös	10,047	59.63%	6,349	37.68%	453	2.69%
Grafton	24,260	44.29%	29,212	53.33%	1,301	2.38%
Hillsborough	125,883	54.48%	100,395	43.45%	4,770	2.07%
Merrimack	47,792	52.07%	42,070	45.83%	1,926	2.1%
Rockingham	113,667	56.88%	82,344	41.21%	3,825	1.92%
Strafford	36,040	47.76%	37,641	49.88%	1,778	2.36%
Sullivan	13,255	53.43%	10,862	43.79%	690	2.78%

Counties that flipped from Republican to Democratic

- Strafford (largest city: Dover)

==== By congressional district ====
Ayotte won both congressional districts, which both elected Democrats.

District	Ayotte	Craig	Representative
1st	54%	44%	Chris Pappas
2nd	53%	45%	Annie Kuster (118th Congress)
2nd	53%	45%	Maggie Goodlander (119th Congress)

== See also ==
- 2024 New Hampshire elections

== Notes ==
Partisan clients
