= Andru Volinsky =

American politician

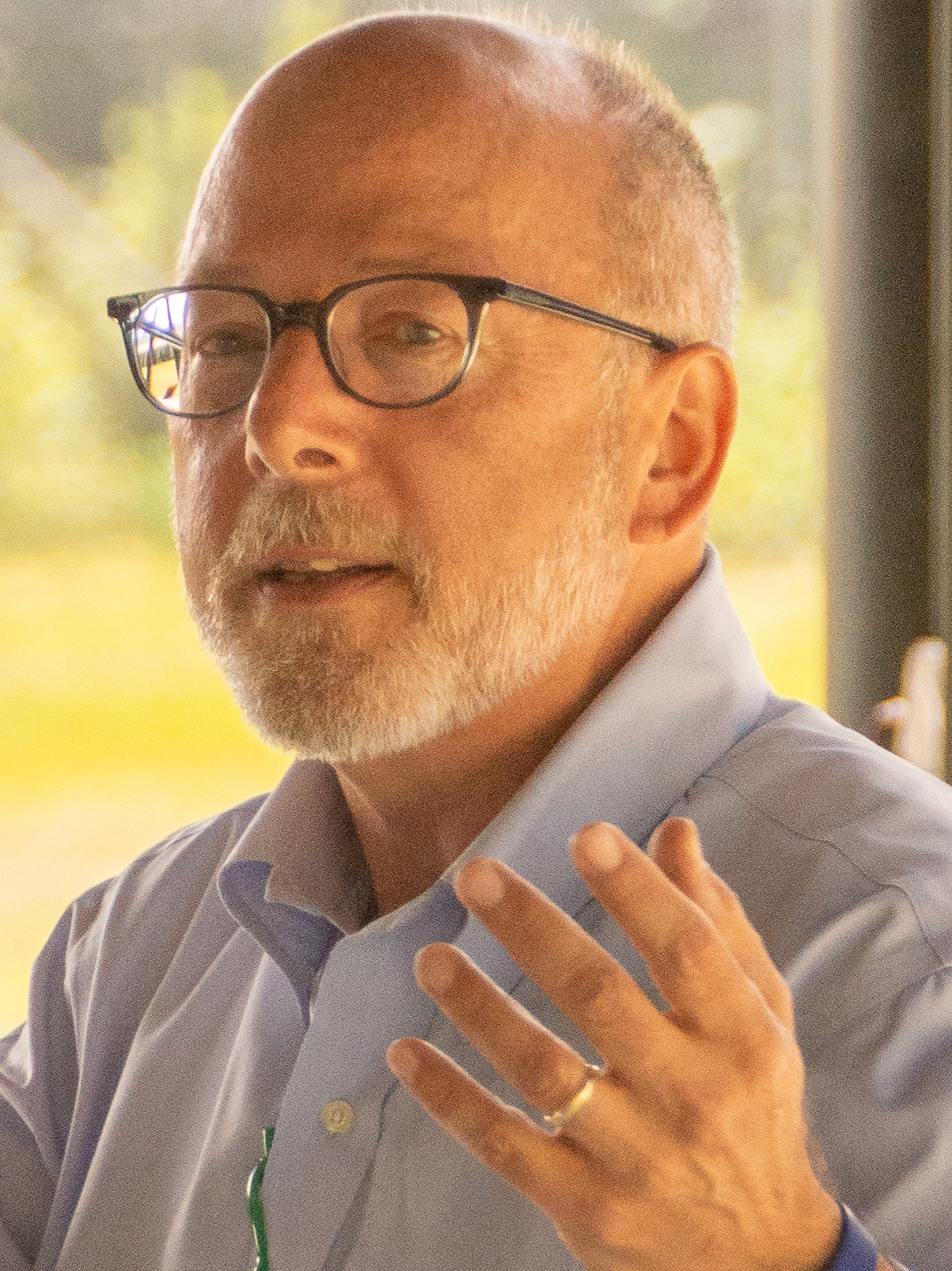

Member of the New Hampshire Executive Council from the 2nd district
- In office January 3, 2017 – January 6, 2021
- Preceded by: Colin Van Ostern
- Succeeded by: Cinde Warmington

Personal details
- Born: March 13, 1956 (age 70) New York City, New York, U.S.
- Party: Democratic
- Spouse: Amy Goldstein
- Children: 3
- Education: University of Miami (BA); George Washington University (JD)
- Website: Campaign website

Andru H. Volinsky (born March 13, 1956) is an American politician, attorney, and social justice advocate. A Democrat, he served as a member of the Executive Council of New Hampshire from the 2nd district from 2017 to 2021.

As an attorney, Volinsky served as lead counsel in the landmark decisions in Claremont School District v. Governor of New Hampshire, in which the New Hampshire Supreme Court recognized a constitutional right to a public education (1993) and held New Hampshire's school funding system unconstitutional (1995). Volinsky unsuccessfully ran for Governor of New Hampshire in the 2020 election.

== Early life and education ==
Volinsky was born in New York City and grew up in Levittown, Pennsylvania, graduating from Woodrow Wilson High School in 1973. His father worked as a mechanic and maintenance man and his mother was a homemaker who raised four children. Volinsky earned a Bachelor of Arts degree in psychology from the University of Miami, which he attended on scholarship, graduating magna cum laude in 1976. He then earned a Juris Doctor from the George Washington University Law School in 1980.

During law school, Volinsky met his wife, Amy Goldstein, who is a fellow attorney and public service advocate.

== Legal and academic career ==
Upon graduation from law school, Volinsky and Goldstein moved from Washington, D.C. to Knoxville, Tennessee, where Volinsky became a clinical instructor at the University of Tennessee College of Law. He taught courses in criminal law and procedure and began defending death penalty cases as a faculty member.

=== Significant cases ===
==== School funding ====
Volinsky served as lead counsel in a series of cases known as Claremont School District v. Governor of New Hampshire in which the petitioners, who were school children, taxpayers and school districts, successfully challenged the way in which New Hampshire funds its schools. The litigation established that children in New Hampshire are entitled to a state-funded public education as a fundamental constitutional right. The principle decisions were issued in 1993 and 1997.

The fundamental rights established in the Claremont cases have never been completely implemented, resulting in the NH Court deciding again in 2019 that the state failed to meet its constitutional obligation. In 2018, Volinsky and his Claremont litigation colleague, John Tobin, began a lengthy process of informing voters about the New Hampshire school funding system through a series of forums called, "Education Funding 101."

Volinsky also represented the Dover School District in 2016 and won a return of more than $1.5 million in unconstitutionally withheld school aid.

==== Death penalty ====
Volinsky has defended against the death penalty throughout the entirety of his career. In 1986, when he was 30, he argued the case of Gray v. Mississippi before the United States Supreme Court and won the reversal of Mr. Gray's sentence of death. For the last thirty years, Volinsky has represented a client on death row in Georgia, Jimmy Meders, whose death sentence in 2020 was commuted and his sentence reduced to life imprisonment without parole.

Andru was part of the 2019 effort to repeal the death penalty in New Hampshire. The successful repeal effort required an override of a gubernatorial veto.

==== Racial profiling ====
Volinsky represented the NHCLU on behalf of young people of color whose photograph had been taken and stored by the Manchester Police Department in the case of New Hampshire Civil Liberties Union v. City of Manchester, 149 N.H. 437. Volinsky argued that by compelling the Manchester police department to release the pictures they had taken, it could help identify race or gender-based discrimination in the police department’s work. This would help the public's ability to see with transparency and hold the police department accountable. The court agreed with this position, and the police stopped this practice.

==== Environment ====
In New Hampshire's Northern Pass case, Andru represented impacted people from Stewartstown and Deerfield. The Eversource project sought to build nearly 200 miles of high-voltage transmission lines through New Hampshire, to connect large-scale hydropower from Quebec to Massachusetts. The Site Evaluation Committee denied the necessary permits for the project and Andru’s work at the Supreme Court helped sustain that denial.

==== Government overpayments ====
Significant cases litigated by Volinsky include his representation of the New Hampshire Secretary of State in the Secretary's effort to fairly regulate self-insured public risk pools under N.H.R.S.A. 5-B. The work of Volinsky's legal team resulted in the return of more than $50 million in overpaid premiums from the Local Government Center Risk Pools to New Hampshire municipalities and school districts. Volinsky and his team negotiated additional refunds of almost $30 million from two other risk pools located in New Hampshire.

==== Pensions ====
In 2014, Volinsky represented four large public unions who sought to challenge the State's effort to shift increased pension costs to existing employees. The New Hampshire Supreme Court upheld the cost shift even though its judicial members enjoyed constitutional protections against the very same cost-shifting.

== Political career ==
Volinsky was elected to the Executive Council in the 2016 election. Volinsky won re-election to a second term on the Executive Council in 2018 in an election that gave control of the Council to the Democrats. He narrowly lost to Dan Feltes for the Democratic nomination in the 2020 New Hampshire gubernatorial election.

Volinsky endorsed Bernie Sanders' campaign in the 2020 Democratic presidential primary. In the 2024 Democratic primary, Volinsky urged voters to write-in "ceasefire" in protest of President Joe Biden's approach to the Gaza war.

== Personal life ==
Andru lives in East Concord, New Hampshire with his wife, Amy. Together they have three grown children: Josh, Mollie, and Bekah. He and Amy raise alpacas, chickens, and organic vegetables, and Andru built his barn from his own standing timber. Amy and Andru have climbed all 48 of New Hampshire’s 4,000 footers.

== Awards ==
- The National Education Association-New Hampshire Friend Friend of Education Award (1997 & 2019)
- NH Civil Liberties Union Bill of Rights Award (1997)
- Merrimack County Attorney of the Year (2000)
- Concord Monitor, One Hundred People Who Shaped the New Hampshire Century (2000)
- NHPR 25 Most Influential People in the last 25 Years (2007)
- Capital Region Food Program Volunteer Hero Award (2018)

== Publications ==
- New Hampshire's Education-Funding Litigation: Claremont School District v. Governor, 635 A.2d 1375 (N.H. 1993), modified, 703 A.2d 1353 (N.H. 1997) Nebraska Law Review, Vol 83, Issue 1, Article 7
