= New Hampshire Department of Labor =

Government agency in the U.S. state of New Hampshire

New Hampshire Department of Labor (DOL)
Agency overview
- Formed: 1893
- Jurisdiction: New Hampshire
- Headquarters: 95 Pleasant Street; Concord, New Hampshire
- Employees: 94 (2019)
- Agency executives: Ken Merrifield, Commissioner; Rudolph W. Ogden III, Deputy Commissioner
- Website: www.dol.nh.gov

The New Hampshire Department of Labor (DOL) is a government agency of the U.S. state of New Hampshire. Based in Concord, the agency works to protect the "interests and dignity" of workers in the state. The department was established by state statute in 1893, and its first commissioner was appointed that year.

== Structure ==
The department has a Workers' Compensation Division and an Inspection Division. There are also several boards and councils:

- State Apprenticeship Advisory Council
- Workers' Compensation Appeals Board
- Workers' Compensation Appeals Advisory Board
- Workers' Compensation Advisory Council
- Vocational Rehabilitation Board

The department is authorized as provided in New Hampshire Revised Statutes Annotated (NH RSA) Chapter 273.
