= Cinde Warmington =

American attorney and politician (born 1957)

Member of the New Hampshire Executive Council from the 2nd district
- In office January 6, 2021 – January 9, 2025
- Preceded by: Andru Volinsky
- Succeeded by: Karen Liot Hill

Personal details
- Born: December 7, 1957 (age 68)
- Party: Democratic
- Spouse: Bill Christie
- Children: 2
- Education: University of Massachusetts, Dartmouth (BS); University of Texas, Arlington (MBA); University of New Hampshire (JD)
- Website: Campaign website

Cinde Warmington (born December 7, 1957) is an American attorney, politician, and former lobbyist. As a Democrat, she served as a member of the Executive Council of New Hampshire from 2021 to 2025.

Prior to her election, Warmington worked in private practice as a healthcare attorney. She formerly worked as a lobbyist on behalf of defunct pharmaceutical company Purdue Pharma. In a 2026 statement, Warmington said she had been assigned the work as a junior attorney long before Purdue Pharma's fraudulent conduct was widely known. Citing her own family's experiences with addiction, she said she never would have accepted the work had she known of Purdue's fraud at the time.

Warmington ran for Governor of New Hampshire in the 2024 election; she lost the Democratic primary to former Manchester mayor Joyce Craig. She ran again in the 2026 election, where she was uncontested in the Democratic primary. Incumbent Republican Kelly Ayotte won reelection in the general election.

== Education ==
Warmington earned a Bachelor of Science degree in medical technology from the University of Massachusetts Dartmouth, a Master of Business Administration from the University of Texas at Arlington, and a Juris Doctor from the University of New Hampshire School of Law.

== Legal and lobbying career ==
Warmington began her career as a health care administrator. She has since worked as a health care attorney at Shaheen & Gordon, P.A. in the firm's health care practice group. She practiced health care law for 20 years.

In 2002, Warmington lobbied on behalf of Purdue Pharma in Concord, New Hampshire, where she defended the company's record on Oxycontin prescriptions. Describing it as a "miracle drug for many patients", Warmington argued the prescription pill "has very few side effects".

== Political career ==
=== Executive Council of New Hampshire ===
In 2020, she ran for the 2nd district of the Executive Council of New Hampshire to succeed fellow Democrat Andru Volinsky. Her campaign received support from pro-choice groups including EMILY’s List and Planned Parenthood's New Hampshire Action Fund PAC. She defeated her Republican opponent, Jim Beard, by a 54.4% to 45.5% margin.

Warmington was reelected in 2022 by a 60% to 40% margin against Republican state senator Harold F. French. As a member of the Executive Council, Warmington urged colleagues to vote down efforts to cancel state contracts with Planned Parenthood.

=== 2024 gubernatorial campaign ===
In June 2023, she announced her campaign for Governor of New Hampshire in the 2024 election. In December 2023, her campaign reported that it brought it over $1 million in donations since she announced her candidacy. Warmington stated that if elected, her inaugural budget proposal would seek to address housing affordability, childcare, and education.

During the campaign, Warmington made combating the opioid epidemic in New Hampshire a leading campaign issue. She has received scrutiny over her work on behalf of PMC Medical Group, a network of pain management clinics accused of contributing to the state's opioid crisis. One of its providers was convicted for taking illegal kickbacks, eventually leading to Owner Michael J. O'Connell surrendering his medical license. Warmington represented O'Connell after he surrendered his license, helped negotiate a settlement for a doctor tied to the kickback scandal, lobbied against legislation that would prevent doctors with revoked licenses from owning a medical practice, and pressured local media outlets against running stories critical of PMC.

O'Connell later donated $49,000 to Warmington's campaign. Recovery advocates and first responders have described it as "blood money".

Kathy Sullivan, the former chair of the New Hampshire Democratic Party, expressed concerns regarding her work for the opioid industry, telling voters that "the dangers of opioids were known - that's why the legislature was acting."

Warmington ultimately came in second in the primary election, finishing behind former Manchester mayor Joyce Craig, and ahead of Jon Kiper.

=== 2026 gubernatorial campaign ===
In February 2026, she announced that she would be launching another campaign for governor, this time in the 2026 election.

More than twice as many voters view Warmington unfavorably as view her favorably.

Warmington's 2026 campaign is raising significantly less money than her 2024 campaign.

== Political positions ==
As a gubernatorial candidate, Warmington advocated for expanding access to abortion in New Hampshire, and favors repealing the 24-week abortion ban instituted by Governor Chris Sununu. Warmington has identified the state's housing crisis and the opioid crisis as long-term challenges facing New Hampshire residents.

Warmington supports a ban on natural gas in New Hampshire by 2040, favoring solar and wind as alternatives.

== Personal life ==
Warmington is married to Bill Christie, an attorney who was legal counsel for the New Hampshire Democratic Party.

Party political offices
| Preceded by Joyce Craig | Democratic nominee for Governor of New Hampshire; 2026 | Most recent |
