= 2024 New Hampshire elections =

The 2024 New Hampshire elections were held on November 5, 2024. The election saw a record-breaking turnout, with over 834,000 total ballots cast, surpassing the previous record set in 2020.

To vote by mail (absentee), registered New Hampshire voters were required to ensure their requests reached their local clerk by 5:00 p.m. on November 4, 2024. Approximately 99,296 voters cast absentee ballots, representing roughly 12% of the total vote share.

== Federal ==
=== President of the United States ===
New Hampshire has 4 electoral votes in the Presidential election. Democratic nominee Kamala Harris won the state.

=== United States House of Representatives ===
There were two seats in New Hampshire to the United States House of Representatives up for election.

== State executive ==
=== Governor ===
Incumbent Republican governor Chris Sununu did not run for re-election to a fifth term. Republican Kelly Ayotte defeated Democrat Joyce Craig to become the state's next governor.

=== Executive Council ===
All 5 seats on the New Hampshire Executive Council were up for election.

== State legislative ==
=== State Senate ===
All 24 seats in the New Hampshire Senate were up for election.

=== State House of Representatives ===
All 400 seats in the New Hampshire House of Representatives were up for election.

== See also ==
- Elections in New Hampshire
- 2024 United States elections
