= 2024 United States presidential election in New Hampshire =

- November 5, 2024
- Turnout: 76% ▲

Nominee	Kamala Harris	Donald Trump
Party	Democratic	Republican
Home state	California	Florida
Running mate	Tim Walz	JD Vance
Electoral vote	4	0
Popular vote	418,488	395,523
Percentage	50.65%	47.87%

Harris
40–50%
50–60%
60–70%
70–80%
80–90%
90–100%
Trump
40–50%
50–60%
60–70%
70–80%
90–100%
Tie/No data
40–50%
50%
President before election
Joe Biden
Democratic
Elected President
Donald Trump
Republican

The 2024 United States presidential election in New Hampshire took place on Tuesday, November 5, 2024, as part of the 2024 United States elections in which all 50 states plus the District of Columbia participated. New Hampshire voters chose electors to represent them in the Electoral College via a popular vote. The state of New Hampshire has four electoral votes in the Electoral College.

New Hampshire was considered a potential battleground state due to the closeness of previous elections. In recent years, the state has shown a much more pronounced Democratic lean at the federal level, as at the time of the 2024 election, New Hampshire's congressional delegation has been entirely Democratic since 2017. As such, most news organizations generally considered the state to be leaning toward Kamala Harris.

New Hampshire was one of the last states called in favor of Harris. She won the state by about 2.8%, significantly closer than Joe Biden's margin in 2020, though moderately wider than Hillary Clinton's margin in 2016. This was Harris's narrowest margin of victory in any state. It was narrower than Nevada, North Carolina and Arizona despite not being as hotly contested by either candidate as those three.

New Hampshire had the closest presidential race out of any state in terms of the margin of raw votes, although the state closest in difference of percentage was Wisconsin.

This also marked the second of only two times that a non-incumbent Republican won the White House without carrying New Hampshire (along with 2016), and the third of only three times overall (along with 2004 and 2016) in which any Republican won without carrying the state. It is also the second time that a Republican has won the popular vote without carrying New Hampshire, with the first time being in 2004. Trump is the only Republican to win two terms without ever carrying the state at least once.

== Primary elections ==
New Hampshire has held the famous "first-in-the-nation" primary since 1920. Delegates are elected separately from a non-binding poll, which dates from 1952. Candidates qualify by presenting a check for $1000 to the Secretary of State's office by a certain date.

Primary elections for both the Democratic and Republican parties were held on January 23, 2024.

=== Democratic primary ===
On February 4, 2023, the Democratic National Committee (DNC) approved a new 2024 primary calendar, in which the South Carolina Democratic primary would be held first on February 3, followed by Nevada and New Hampshire on February 6. New Hampshire Republican governor Chris Sununu, Democratic senators Maggie Hassan and Jeanne Shaheen, and the state legislature vowed to continue holding the "first-in-the-nation" primary (as New Hampshire state law establishes) and ultimately did set an earlier date of January 23.

Showing solidarity with the DNC, Biden declined to appear on the state's primary ballot. Pro-Biden New Hampshire Democrats nevertheless launched a formal write-in campaign for him, but none of the state's delegates to the Democratic National Convention will still be binding.

Popular vote share by county Biden: 50–60%; 60–70%

New Hampshire Democratic primary, January 23, 2024
Candidate	Votes	%
Joe Biden (incumbent; write-in)	79,100	63.79
Dean Phillips	24,377	19.66
Marianne Williamson	5,016	4.05
Derek Nadeau	1,616	1.30
"Cease Fire" (write-in)	1,512	1.22
Vermin Supreme	912	0.74
John Vail	685	0.55
Robert F. Kennedy Jr. (write-in) (Ind.)	439	0.35
Donald Picard	371	0.30
Paperboy Prince	326	0.26
Paul V. LaCava	176	0.14
Jason Michael Palmer	142	0.11
President R. Boddie	136	0.11
Mark Stewart Greenstein	133	0.11
Bernie Sanders (write-in) (Ind.)	125	0.10
Terrisa Bukovinac	101	0.08
Gabriel Cornejo	86	0.07
Stephen P. Lyons	80	0.06
Frankie Lozada	73	0.06
Tom Koos	71	0.06
Armando "Mando" Perez-Serrato	68	0.05
Star Locke	59	0.05
Raymond Michael Moroz	52	0.04
Eban Cambridge	47	0.04
Richard Rist	37	0.03
Nikki Haley (write-in) (Republican)	4,760	3.84
Donald Trump (write-in) (Republican)	2,079	1.68
Chris Christie (write-in) (Republican)	41	0.03
Ron DeSantis (write-in) (Republican)	33	0.03
Vivek Ramaswamy (write-in) (Republican)	2	<0.01
Other write-in votes, reported as "Scatter".	1,341	1.08
Total	123,996	100%

No delegates were awarded from the January New Hampshire primary.

=== Republican primary ===
The New Hampshire Republican primary was held on January 23, 2024, as the second contest of the Republican primaries, held about a week after the Iowa caucuses. 22 delegates to the 2024 Republican National Convention were allocated to candidates who received at least 10% of the statewide vote. The primary was won by Donald Trump, who defeated Nikki Haley by eleven points.

Popular vote share by county Trump: 50–60%; 60–70%; Haley: 50–60%

New Hampshire Republican primary, January 23, 2024
Candidate	Votes	Percentage	Delegate count				
Candidate	Votes	Percentage	Delegate count	Donald Trump	176,391	54.35%	13
Nikki Haley	140,491	43.28%	9				
Ron DeSantis (withdrawn)	2,241	0.69%					
Chris Christie (withdrawn)	1,493	0.46%					
Vivek Ramaswamy (withdrawn)	833	0.26%					
Joe Biden (write-in) (Democrat)	497	0.15%					
Mike Pence (withdrawn)	404	0.12%					
Ryan Binkley	315	0.10%					
Mary Maxwell	287	0.09%					
Robert F. Kennedy (write-in) (Independent)	205	0.06%					
Tim Scott (withdrawn)	196	0.06%					
Doug Burgum (withdrawn)	180	0.06%					
Asa Hutchinson (withdrawn)	108	0.03%					
Rachel Swift	105	0.03%					
Scott Ayers	80	0.02%					
Dean Phillips (write-in) (Democrat)	79	0.02%					
Darius Mitchell	74	0.02%					
Glenn McPeters	49	0.02%					
"Ceasefire" (write-in)	34	0.01%					
Perry Johnson (withdrawn)	26	0.01%					
Peter Jedick	25	0.01%					
David Stuckenberg	25	0.01%					
Donald Kjornes	23	0.01%					
Scott Merrell	21	0.01%					
John Anthony Castro	19	0.01%					
Robert Carney	15	<0.01%					
Marianne Williamson (write-in) (Democrat)	14	<0.01%					
Hirsh Singh (withdrawn)	9	<0.01%					
Sam Sloan	7	<0.01%					
Vermin Supreme (write-in) (Democrat)	3	<0.01%					
Mark Steward Greenstein (write-in) (Democrat)	1	<0.01%					
Other write-in votes	325	0.10%					
Total:	324,575	100.00%	22				

== General election ==
=== Predictions ===
Source	Ranking	As of
Cook Political Report	Likely D	August 27, 2024
Inside Elections	Lean D	May 8, 2024
Sabato's Crystal Ball	Likely D	August 20, 2024
Decision Desk HQ/The Hill	Likely D	November 5, 2024
CNalysis	Solid D	November 4, 2024
CNN	Lean D	August 27, 2024
The Economist	Likely D	October 21, 2024
538	Likely D	September 12, 2024
YouGov	Safe D	November 1, 2024
Split Ticket	Likely D	November 1, 2024

=== Polling ===
Kamala Harris vs. Donald Trump

Aggregate polls

Source of poll aggregation	Dates administered	Dates updated	Kamala Harris Democratic	Donald Trump Republican	Undecided (Note: Calculated by taking the difference of 100% and all other candidates combined.)	Margin
270ToWin	October 24 – November 3, 2024	November 3, 2024	50.5%	45.5%	4.0%	Harris +5.0%
538	through November 4, 2024	November 4, 2024	50.3%	45.4%	4.3%	Harris +4.9%
Silver Bulletin	through November 4, 2024	November 4, 2024	50.9%	46.3%	2.8%	Harris +4.6%
The Hill/DDHQ	through November 4, 2024	November 4, 2024	53.3%	42.5%	4.2%	Harris +10.8%
Average			51.3%	44.9%	3.8%	Harris +6.4%

Poll source	Date(s) administered	Sample size (Note: Key: A – all adults RV – registered voters LV – likely voters V – unclear)	Margin of error	Kamala Harris Democratic	Donald Trump Republican	Other / Undecided
Dartmouth College	November 1–3, 2024	587 (LV)	± 4.0%	62%	34%	4%
Rasmussen Reports (R) (Note: Poll sponsored by American Thinker)	October 24–28, 2024	901 (LV)	± 3.0%	48%	47%	5% (Note: "Other" with 3%)
Praecones Analytica/NHJournal	October 24–26, 2024	622 (RV)	–	50%	50%	–
CES/YouGov	October 1–25, 2024	380 (A)	–	52%	45%	3%
CES/YouGov	October 1–25, 2024	375 (LV)	–	52%	45%	3%
Emerson College (Note: Poll sponsored by WHDH)	October 21–23, 2024	915 (LV)	± 3.2%	50%	47%	3% (Note: "Someone else" with 2%)
Emerson College	October 21–23, 2024	915 (LV)	± 3.2%	51% (Note: With voters who lean towards a given candidate)	47%	2%
Dartmouth College	October 5–18, 2024	2,211 (RV)	± 2.1%	59%	38%	3%
	August 23, 2024	Robert F. Kennedy Jr. suspends his presidential campaign and endorses Donald Trump.				
	August 22, 2024	Democratic National Convention concludes				
University of New Hampshire	August 15–19, 2024	2,048 (LV)	± 2.2%	52%	47%	1%
	August 19, 2024	Democratic National Convention begins				
	August 6, 2024	Kamala Harris selects Gov. Tim Walz as her running mate.				
Emerson College	July 26–28, 2024	1,000 (RV)	± 3.0%	50%	46%	4%
Emerson College	July 26–28, 2024	1,000 (RV)	± 3.0%	52%	48%	–
University of New Hampshire	July 23–25, 2024	2,875 (LV)	± 1.8%	53%	46%	1%
	July 21, 2024	Joe Biden announces his official withdrawal from the race; Kamala Harris declares her candidacy for president.				
	July 15–19, 2024	Republican National Convention				
	July 13, 2024	attempted assassination of Donald Trump				
Trafalgar Group (R)	December 10–12, 2021	1,041 (LV)	± 3.0%	46%	48%	6%

Kamala Harris vs. Donald Trump vs. Cornel West vs. Jill Stein vs. Chase Oliver

Poll source	Date(s) administered	Sample size	Margin of error	Kamala Harris Democratic	Donald Trump Republican	Cornel West Independent	Jill Stein Green	Chase Oliver Libertarian	Other / Undecided
University of New Hampshire	October 29 – November 2, 2024	2,814 (LV)	± 1.9%	51%	46%	–	0%	1%	2% (Note: "Another candidate" with 1%)
Saint Anselm College	October 28–29, 2024	2,791 (LV)	± 2.6%	51%	46%	0%	0%	1%	2% (Note: "Someone else" with 1%)
University of Massachusetts Lowell/YouGov	October 10–23, 2024	600 (LV)	± 4.4%	50%	43%	–	1%	1%	5%
University of Massachusetts Lowell/YouGov	October 2–10, 2024	600 (LV)	± 4.8%	50%	41%	–	1%	1%	7%
Saint Anselm College	October 1–2, 2024	2,104 (LV)	± 2.1%	51%	44%	0%	1%	1%	3%
University of New Hampshire	September 12–16, 2024	1,695 (LV)	± 2.4%	54%	43%	–	0%	1%	2%
Saint Anselm College	September 11–12, 2024	2,241 (LV)	± 2.1%	51%	43%	0%	1%	1%	4%

Hypothetical polling with Robert F. Kennedy Jr.

Kamala Harris vs. Donald Trump vs. Robert F. Kennedy Jr. vs Cornel West vs. Jill Stein vs. Chase Oliver

Poll source	Date(s) administered	Sample size	Margin of error	Kamala Harris Democratic	Donald Trump Republican	Robert Kennedy Jr Independent	Cornel West Independent	Jill Stein Green	Chase Oliver Libertarian	Other / Undecided
University of New Hampshire	August 15–19, 2024	2,048 (LV)	± 2.2%	50%	43%	4%	–	0%	0%	3%
Emerson College	July 26–28, 2024	1,000 (RV)	± 3.0%	48%	41%	6%	0%	1%	–	4%
Saint Anselm College	July 24–25, 2024	2,083 (RV)	± 2.1%	50%	44%	3%	0%	0%	0%	3%

Kamala Harris vs. Donald Trump vs Robert F. Kennedy Jr.

Poll source	Date(s) administered	Sample size	Margin of error	Kamala Harris Democratic	Donald Trump Republican	Robert Kennedy Jr Independent	Other / Undecided
University of New Hampshire	July 23–25, 2024	2,875 (LV)	± 1.8%	49%	43%	4%	8%
	July 21, 2024	Joe Biden announces his official withdrawal from the race; Kamala Harris declares her candidacy for president.					
Praecones Analytica/NHJournal	July 19–21, 2024	601 (V)	–	39%	40%	21%	–

Hypothetical polling with Joe Biden and Donald Trump

Joe Biden vs. Donald Trump

Poll source	Date(s) administered	Sample size	Margin of error	Joe Biden Democratic	Donald Trump Republican	Other/ Undecided
University of New Hampshire	May 16–20, 2024	1,140 (LV)	± 2.9%	52%	48%	–
John Zogby Strategies (Note: Poll conducted for Kennedy's campaign)	April 13–21, 2024	515 (LV)	–	48%	44%	8%
Marist College	January 15–17, 2024	1,157 (RV)	± 3.8%	52%	45%	3%
Emerson College	November 10–13, 2023	917 (RV)	± 3.3%	47%	42%	11%
University of New Hampshire/CNN	September 14–18, 2023	2,108 (LV)	± 2.2%	52%	40%	8%
Emerson College	August 9–11, 2023	837 (RV)	± 3.4%	48%	41%	11%
American Pulse Research & Polling	July 5−11, 2023	895 (LV)	± 3.2%	52%	40%	8%
Saint Anselm College	June 21–23, 2023	1,065 (RV)	± 3.0%	49%	40%	11%
Emerson College	March 3–5, 2023	1,025 (RV)	± 3.0%	42%	38%	20% (Note: "Someone else" with 16%)
co/efficient (R) (Note: Poll conducted for the New Hampshire Journal)	January 25–26, 2023	1,179 (LV)	± 3.2%	40%	39%	21%
Emerson College	October 30 – November 1, 2022	850 (LV)	± 3.3%	45%	41%	14%
University of Massachusetts Lowell	October 14–25, 2022	600 (LV)	± 5.1%	49%	43%	8%
Emerson College	October 18–19, 2022	727 (LV)	± 3.6%	44%	43%	13%
Emerson College	September 14–15, 2022	800 (LV)	± 3.4%	46%	43%	11%
University of New Hampshire	June 16–20, 2022	845 (LV)	± 3.2%	50%	43%	8%
The Trafalgar Group (R)	December 10–12, 2021	1,041 (LV)	± 3.0%	46%	48%	6%
Saint Anselm College (Note: Poll conducted for the John Bolton Super PAC)	May 7–10, 2021	1,267 (RV)	± 2.8%	50%	43%	7%

Joe Biden vs. Donald Trump vs. Robert F. Kennedy Jr. vs. Cornel West vs. Jill Stein

Poll source	Date(s) administered	Sample size	Margin of error	Joe Biden Democratic	Donald Trump Republican	Robert Kennedy Jr Independent	Cornel West Independent	Jill Stein Green	Other / Undecided
Saint Anselm College	June 28–29, 2024	1,746 (RV)	± 2.3%	42%	44%	4%	1%	1%	8%
University of New Hampshire	May 16–20, 2024	1,140 (LV)	± 2.9%	44%	41%	3%	1%	2%	9%
Suffolk University/USA Today/Boston Globe	January 3–7, 2024	1,000 (LV)	± 3.1%	42%	34%	8%	1%	1%	14% (Note: Joe Manchin (I) with 2%; Lars Mapstead (L) with 1%)

Joe Biden vs. Donald Trump vs. Robert F. Kennedy Jr.

Poll source	Date(s) administered	Sample size	Margin of error	Joe Biden Democratic	Donald Trump Republican	Robert Kennedy Jr Independent	Other / Undecided
Praecones Analytica/NHJournal	July 19–21, 2024	601 (V)	–	39%	40%	21%	–
Praecones Analytica/NHJournal	May 15–20, 2024	862 (RV)	± 3.3%	37%	37%	15%	11%
University of Massachusetts Lowell/YouGov	May 6–14, 2024	600 (LV)	± 5.2%	42%	36%	11%	11%
Marist College	January 15–17, 2024	1,157 (RV)	± 3.8%	44%	41%	12%	3%
Saint Anselm College	December 18–19, 2023	1,711 (LV)	± 3.9%	49%	39%	8%	4%

Joe Biden vs. Donald Trump vs. Robert F. Kennedy Jr. vs. Cornel West

Poll source	Date(s) administered	Sample size	Margin of error	Joe Biden Democratic	Donald Trump Republican	Robert Kennedy Jr Independent	Cornel West Independent	Other / Undecided
Emerson College	November 10–13, 2023	917 (RV)	± 3.3%	40%	37%	8%	1%	14%

Joe Biden vs. Donald Trump vs. Cornel West

Poll source	Date(s) administered	Sample size	Margin of error	Joe Biden Democratic	Donald Trump Republican	Cornel West Green	Other / Undecided
Emerson College	August 9–11, 2023	837 (RV)	± 3.4%	44%	39%	5%	13%

Hypothetical polling with other candidates

Joe Biden vs. Robert F. Kennedy Jr.

Poll source	Date(s) administered	Sample size	Margin of error	Joe Biden Democratic	Robert F. Kennedy Jr. Independent	Other / Undecided
John Zogby Strategies	April 13–21, 2024	515 (LV)	–	41%	47%	12%

Robert F. Kennedy Jr. vs. Donald Trump

Poll source	Date(s) administered	Sample size	Margin of error	Robert F. Kennedy Jr. Independent	Donald Trump Republican	Other / Undecided
John Zogby Strategies	April 13–21, 2024	515 (LV)	–	45%	40%	15%

Bernie Sanders vs. Donald Trump

Poll source	Date(s) administered	Sample size	Margin of error	Bernie Sanders Democratic	Donald Trump Republican	Other/ Undecided
Emerson College	November 10–13, 2023	917 (RV)	± 3.3%	48%	43%	9%

Elizabeth Warren vs. Donald Trump

Poll source	Date(s) administered	Sample size	Margin of error	Elizabeth Warren Democratic	Donald Trump Republican	Other/ Undecided
Emerson College	November 10–13, 2023	917 (RV)	± 3.3%	45%	43%	12%

Joe Biden vs. Nikki Haley

Poll source	Date(s) administered	Sample size	Margin of error	Joe Biden Democratic	Nikki Haley Republican	Other / Undecided
Marist College	January 15–17, 2024	1,157 (RV)	± 3.8%	44%	47%	9%
Emerson College	November 10–13, 2023	917 (RV)	± 3.3%	39%	45%	16%

Joe Biden vs. Ron DeSantis

Poll source	Date(s) administered	Sample size	Margin of error	Joe Biden Democratic	Ron DeSantis Republican	Other / Undecided
Marist College	January 15–17, 2024	1,157 (RV)	± 3.8%	51%	42%	7%
Emerson College	November 10–13, 2023	917 (RV)	± 3.3%	46%	38%	16%
University of New Hampshire/CNN	September 14–18, 2023	2,108 (LV)	± 2.2%	50%	33%	17% (Note: Donald Trump with 10%; "Another candidate" with 5%)
Saint Anselm College	June 21–23, 2023	1,065 (RV)	± 3.0%	49%	40%	11% (Note: "Other" with 10%)
Emerson College	March 3–5, 2023	1,025 (RV)	± 3.0%	42%	37%	7% (Note: "Someone else" with 14%)
University of New Hampshire	June 16–20, 2022	845 (LV)	± 3.2%	46%	47%	7%

Joe Biden vs. Vivek Ramaswamy

Poll source	Date(s) administered	Sample size	Margin of error	Joe Biden Democratic	Vivek Ramaswamy Republican	Other/ Undecided
University of New Hampshire/CNN	September 14–18, 2023	2,018 (LV)	± 2.2%	49%	20%	31% (Note: Donald Trump with 9%; "Another candidate" with 6%)

Joe Biden vs. Tim Scott

Poll source	Date(s) administered	Sample size	Margin of error	Joe Biden Democratic	Tim Scott Republican	Other/ Undecided
University of New Hampshire/CNN	September 14–18, 2023	2,018 (LV)	± 2.2%	47%	34%	19% (Note: Donald Trump with 10%; "Another candidate" with 4%)
American Pulse Research & Polling	July 5−11, 2023	895 (LV)	± 3.2%	46%	41%	13%

Joe Biden vs. Chris Christie

Poll source	Date(s) administered	Sample size	Margin of error	Joe Biden Democratic	Chris Christie Republican	Other/ Undecided
University of New Hampshire/CNN	September 14–18, 2023	2,018 (LV)	± 2.2%	44%	20%	36% (Note: Donald Trump with 16%; "Another candidate" with 11%)

Joe Biden vs. Mike Pence

Poll source	Date(s) administered	Sample size	Margin of error	Joe Biden Democratic	Mike Pence Republican	Other/ Undecided
University of New Hampshire/CNN	September 14–18, 2023	2,018 (LV)	± 2.2%	49%	20%	31% (Note: Donald Trump with 15%; "Another candidate" with 10%)

Joe Biden vs. Chris Sununu

Poll source	Date(s) administered	Sample size	Margin of error	Joe Biden Democratic	Chris Sununu Republican	Other/ Undecided
Emerson College	March 3–5, 2023	1,025 (RV)	± 3.0%	36%	44%	6%
co/efficient (R)	January 25–26, 2023	1,179 (LV)	± 3.15%	36%	48%	16%
Praecones Analytica/NHJournal	April 14–16, 2022	503 (RV)	± 4.6%	36%	53%	12%

=== Results ===
State House district results: Trump 40–50% 50–60% 60–70% / Harris 40–50% 50–60% 60–70% 70–80% 80–90%

2024 United States presidential election in New Hampshire
Party	Candidate	Votes	%	±%
Democratic	Kamala Harris; Tim Walz	418,488	50.65%	−2.13%
Republican	Donald Trump; JD Vance	395,523	47.87%	+2.45%
Libertarian	Chase Oliver (Note: The Libertarian Party of New Hampshire released a statement acknowledging the nomination of Oliver by the national Libertarian Party, choosing to endorse Donald Trump instead.); Mike ter Maat	4,425	0.54%	−1.10%
Green	Jill Stein; Butch Ware	3,680	0.45%	+0.42%
Write-in		4,073	0.49%	+0.37%
Total votes		826,189	100.00%	N/A

==== By county ====
County	Kamala Harris Democratic		Donald Trump Republican		Various candidates Other parties		Margin		Total
County	#	%	#	%	#	%	#	%	Total
Belknap	17,469	42.95%	22,765	55.97%	442	1.09%	-5,296	-13.02%	40,676
Carroll	16,822	48.54%	17,426	50.28%	410	1.18%	-604	-1.74%	34,658
Cheshire	24,579	54.15%	20,083	44.25%	727	1.60%	4,496	9.90%	45,389
Coos	7,367	42.53%	9,734	56.19%	221	1.28%	-2,367	-13.66%	17,322
Grafton	32,993	59.03%	21,909	39.20%	993	1.78%	11,084	19.83%	55,895
Hillsborough	118,776	50.66%	112,057	47.80%	3,607	1.54%	6,719	2.86%	234,440
Merrimack	48,181	51.82%	43,364	46.64%	1,433	1.54%	4,817	5.18%	92,978
Rockingham	97,611	48.10%	102,539	50.53%	2,772	1.37%	-4,928	-2.43%	202,922
Strafford	42,373	55.25%	33,162	43.24%	1,153	1.50%	9,211	12.01%	76,688
Sullivan	12,317	48.84%	12,484	49.50%	420	1.67%	-167	-0.66%	25,221
Totals	418,488	50.65%	395,523	47.87%	12,178	1.47%	22,965	2.78%	826,189

Counties that flipped from Democratic to Republican

- Carroll (largest city: Conway)
- Rockingham (largest city: Derry)
- Sullivan (largest city: Claremont)

==== By congressional district ====
Harris won both congressional districts.

District	Harris	Trump	Representative
1st	50.29%	48.30%	Chris Pappas
2nd	51.01%	47.44%	Maggie Goodlander

== Analysis ==
A rural New England state with a libertarian streak dominated by moderate voters, New Hampshire had backed Republicans in most presidential elections since the party's formation in 1854 up until 1988, except for Woodrow Wilson in 1912 and 1916; Franklin D. Roosevelt in 1936, 1940 and 1944; and Lyndon B. Johnson in 1964. Since the early 1990s, however, the state has begun to lean toward the Democrats at the federal level, with Democrats carrying the state by single digits in every presidential election since 1992 with the exception of George W. Bush's narrow victory in 2000.

A study by the Center for Election Innovation & Research in July 2024 found that New Hampshire is one of only three remaining states (along with Mississippi and Alabama) to offer no early in-person voting option for the 2024 general election. The state also requires an eligible reason to vote by mail. By tradition, since 1960, all eligible voters of Dixville Notch, New Hampshire cast their votes at midnight on Election Day.

Harris suffered a setback, earning 2.13% less of the vote than Biden did in 2020. She ceded ground in every county across the state, while Trump flipped three counties: Carroll, Rockingham, and Sullivan. Trump won all three of those counties in 2016 before losing them to Biden in 2020; as a result, New Hampshire is the state with the most counties that have voted for Trump in 2016, Biden in 2020, and Trump again in 2024. He nonetheless became the first Republican to win the White House without carrying Hillsborough County since Richard Nixon in 1968. This is the first time since 2016 in which the state winner did not win a majority of the counties, with Harris and Trump winning five each.

Notably, on the same ballot, Republicans won the open governor race and expanded their majorities in both state legislative chambers.

The towns of Acworth, Berlin, Claremont, Francestown, Freedom, Greenfield, Hart's Location, Jaffrey, Langdon, Littleton, Lyndeborough, Martin's Location, Nottingham, Pembroke, Shelburne, Springfield, Stratford, Sullivan, Swanzey, Tamworth, and Temple all flipped to Trump after either backing Joe Biden, yielding a tie, or recording no votes in 2020.

Success and Wolfeboro both flipped to Harris after either backing Trump, yielding a tie, or recording no votes in 2020.

== See also ==
- United States presidential elections in New Hampshire
- 2024 United States presidential election
- 2024 Democratic Party presidential primaries
- 2024 Republican Party presidential primaries
- 2024 New Hampshire elections
- 2024 United States elections

== Notes ==
Partisan clients
