= 2016 United States presidential election in New Hampshire =

- November 8, 2016
- Turnout: 69.1%
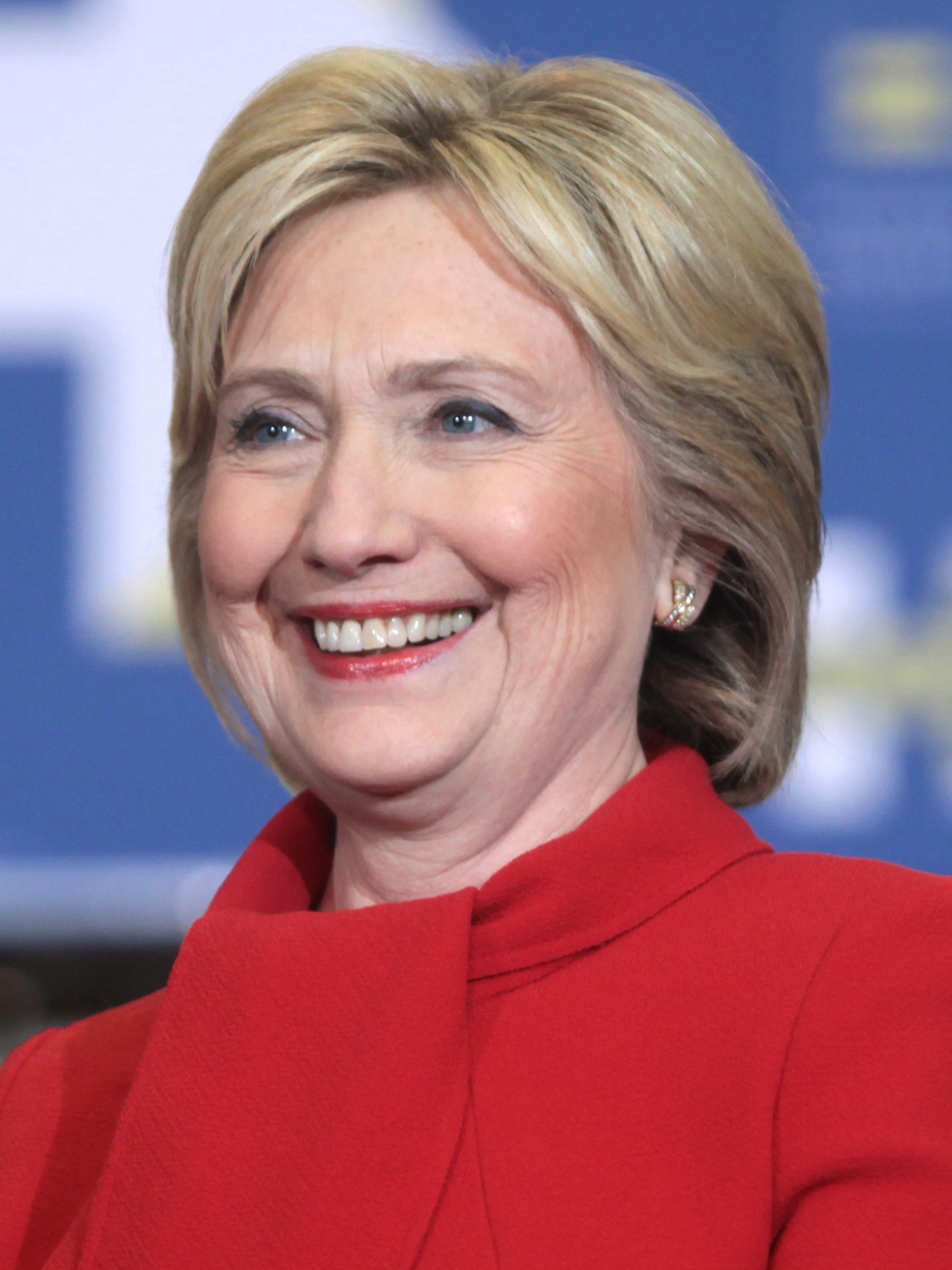

Nominee	Hillary Clinton	Donald Trump
Party	Democratic	Republican
Home state	New York	New York
Running mate	Tim Kaine	Mike Pence
Electoral vote	4	0
Popular vote	348,526	345,790
Percentage	46.83%	46.46%

Clinton
40–50%
50–60%
60–70%
70–80%
80–90%
90–100%
Trump
40–50%
50–60%
60–70%
70–80%
80–90%
Tie/No data
50%
President before election
Barack Obama
Democratic
Elected President
Donald Trump
Republican

Treemap of the popular vote by county

The 2016 United States presidential election in New Hampshire was held on Tuesday, November 8, 2016, as part of the 2016 United States presidential election in which all 50 states plus the District of Columbia participated. New Hampshire voters chose electors to represent them in the Electoral College via a popular vote, pitting the Republican Party's nominee, businessman Donald Trump, and his running mate Indiana Governor Mike Pence, against the Democratic Party's nominee, former U.S. Secretary of State Hillary Clinton, and her running mate Virginia Senator Tim Kaine. New Hampshire has four electoral votes in the Electoral College.

Clinton won the state with 46.83% of the vote, while Trump lost with 46.46%, a 0.37% margin, or 2,736 votes. This result nonetheless made New Hampshire 1.73% more Republican than the nation-at-large, and remains the only time since 2000 that New Hampshire has voted to the right of the national environment. New Hampshire being one of the most educated states in the country kept the state from flipping to Trump, due to Trump underperforming among white college-educated voters. This marked the second-closest margin percentage in the presidential election, behind only Michigan, and was Clinton's closest margin of victory of any state. Along with Maine's 2nd district, New Hampshire's 1st district was one of only two congressional districts in New England to vote for Trump.

This is the closest that a Republican nominee has come to carrying New Hampshire since 2000, when George W. Bush became the last Republican to carry the state. This also marked the first of only two times that a non-incumbent Republican won the White House without carrying New Hampshire (along with 2024), and the second of only three times overall (along with 2004 and 2024) in which any Republican won without carrying the state. As of the 2024 presidential election, this is the last time Hillsborough County voted for a Republican presidential candidate.

== Primary elections ==
As per tradition and by New Hampshire electoral laws, New Hampshire holds the primaries before any other state. As a result, candidates for nomination usually spend a long period campaigning in New Hampshire.

=== Democratic primary ===
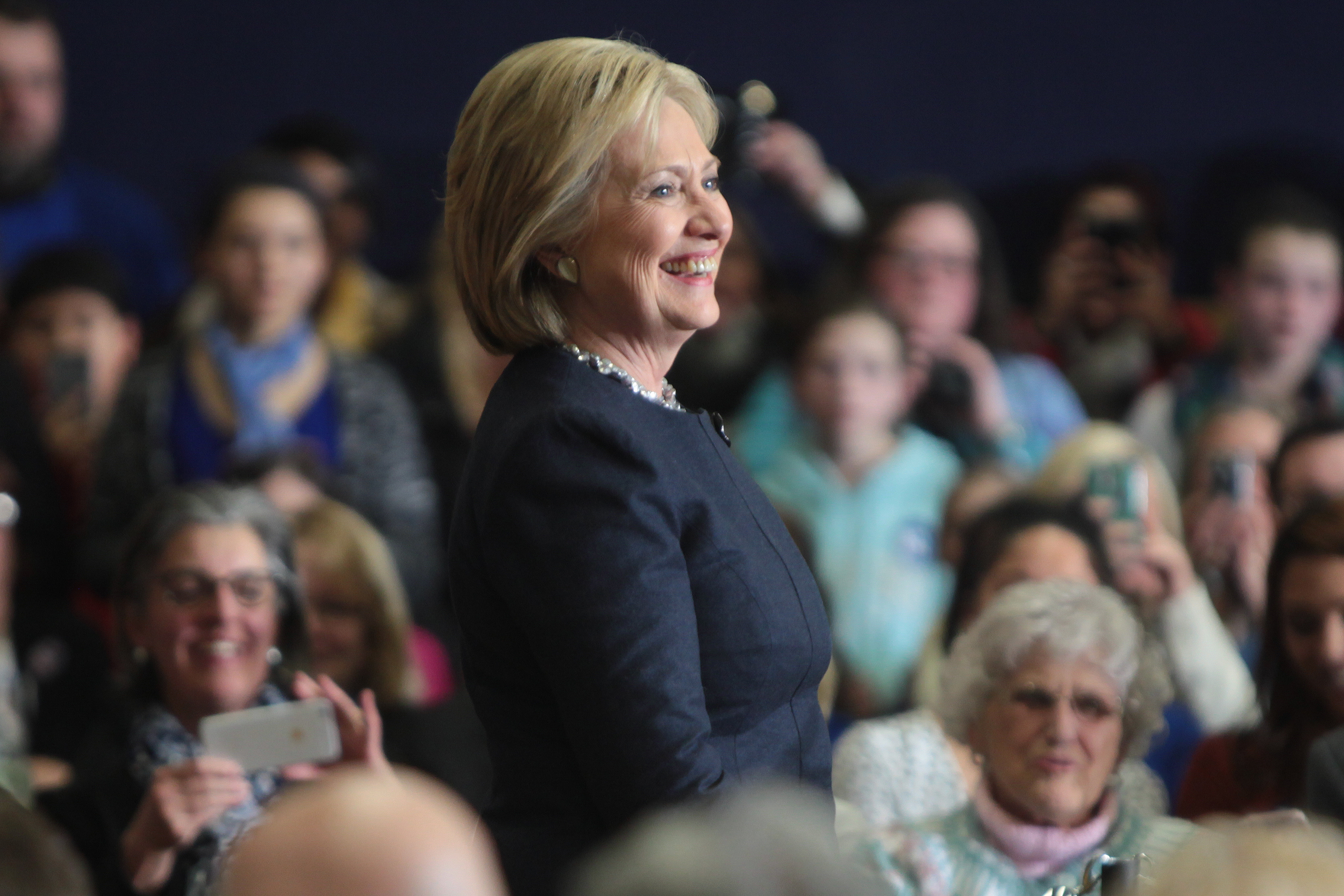
Former Secretary of State Hillary Clinton at a campaign event in Manchester

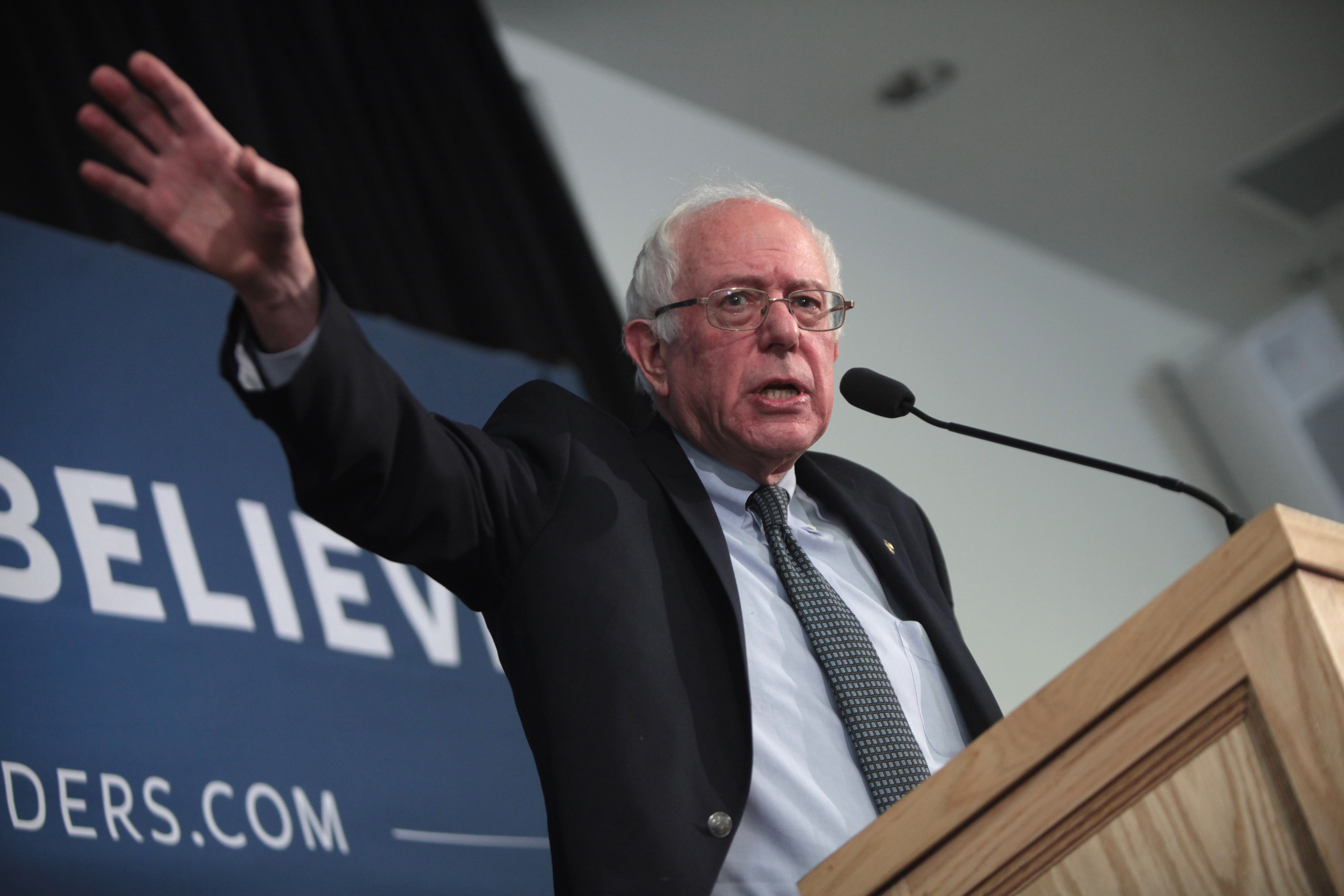
Senator Bernie Sanders at a campaign event in Hooksett

In the New Hampshire Democratic primary taking place on February 9, 2016, there were 24 pledged delegates and 8 super delegates that went to the Democratic National Convention. The pledged electors were allocated in this way. 16 delegates were allocated proportionally by congressional district (8 delegates per district). The other 8 delegates were allocated based on the statewide popular vote.

==== Results ====
New Hampshire Democratic primary, February 9, 2016
Candidate	Popular vote		Estimated delegates		
Candidate	Count	Of total	Pledged	Unpledged	Total
Bernie Sanders	152,193	60.14%	15	1	16
Hillary Clinton	95,355	37.68%	9	6	15
Martin O'Malley (withdrawn)	667	0.26%			
Vermin Supreme	268	0.11%			
David John Thistle	226	0.09%			
Graham Schwass	143	0.06%			
Steve Burke	108	0.04%			
Rocky De La Fuente	96	0.04%			
John Wolfe Jr.	54	0.02%			
Jon Adams	53	0.02%			
Lloyd Thomas Kelso	46	0.02%			
Keith Russell Judd	44	0.02%			
Eric Elbot	36	0.01%			
Star Locke	33	0.01%			
William D. French	29	0.01%			
Mark Stewart Greenstein	29	0.01%			
Edward T. O'Donnell	26	0.01%			
James Valentine	24	0.01%			
Robert Lovitt	22	0.01%			
Michael Steinberg	21	0.01%			
William H. McGaughey Jr.	19	0.01%			
Henry Hewes	18	0.01%			
Edward Sonnino	17	0.01%			
Steven Roy Lipscomb	15	0.01%			
Sam Sloan	15	0.01%			
Brock C. Hutton	14	0.01%			
Raymond Michael Moroz	8	0.00%			
Richard Lyons Weil	8	0.00%			
Write-ins (Note: The write-ins include 3,248 votes for these 11 Republican presidential candidates: Trump (1795), Kasich (438), Jeb Bush (263), Christie (216), Marco Rubio (203), Ted Cruz (162), Fiorina (99), Carson (52), Paul (12), Gilmore (6), Huckabee (2).)	3,475	1.37%			
Uncommitted	—N/a		0	1	1
Total	253,062	100%	24	8	32

=== Republican primary ===
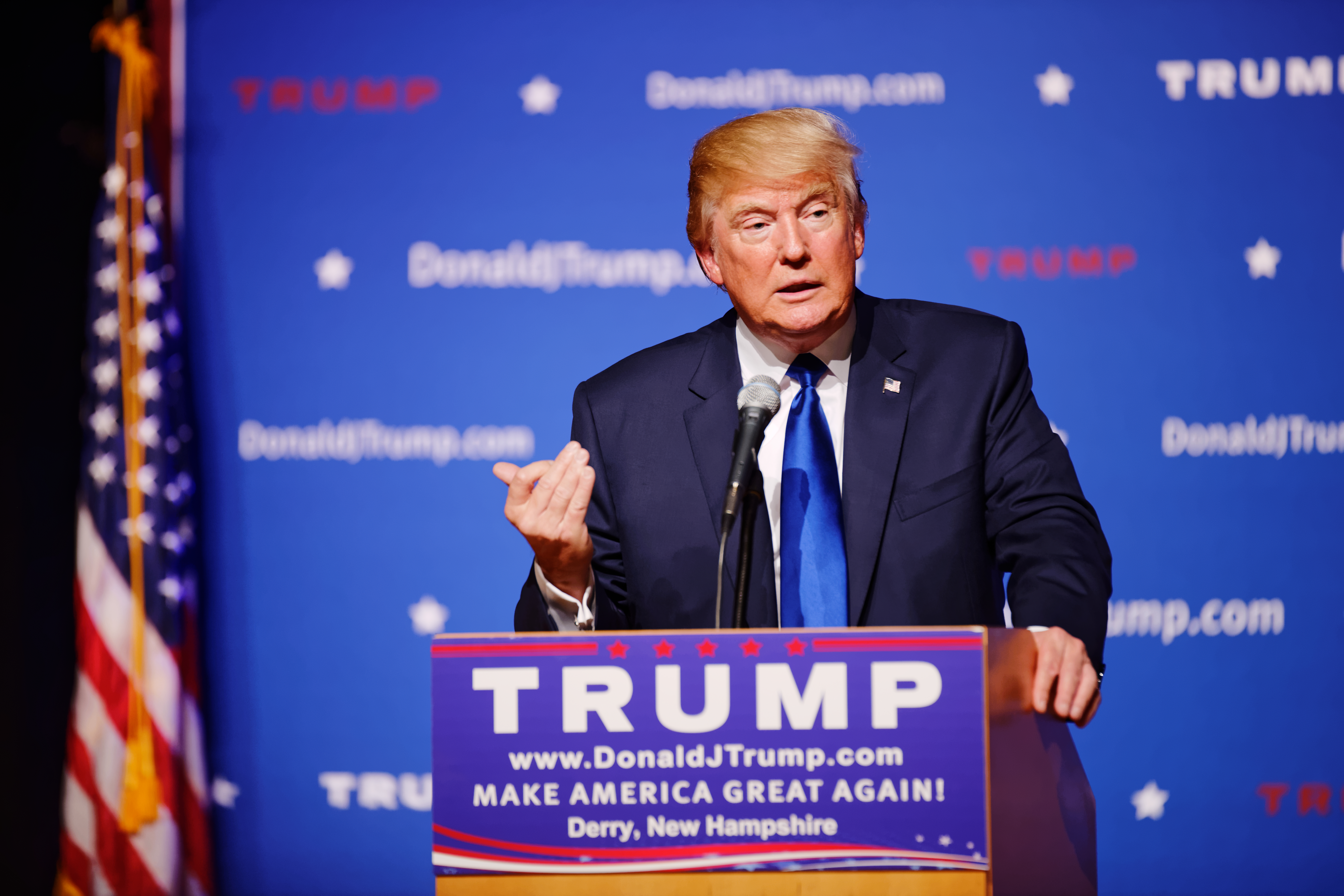
Businessman Donald Trump at a campaign event in Derry

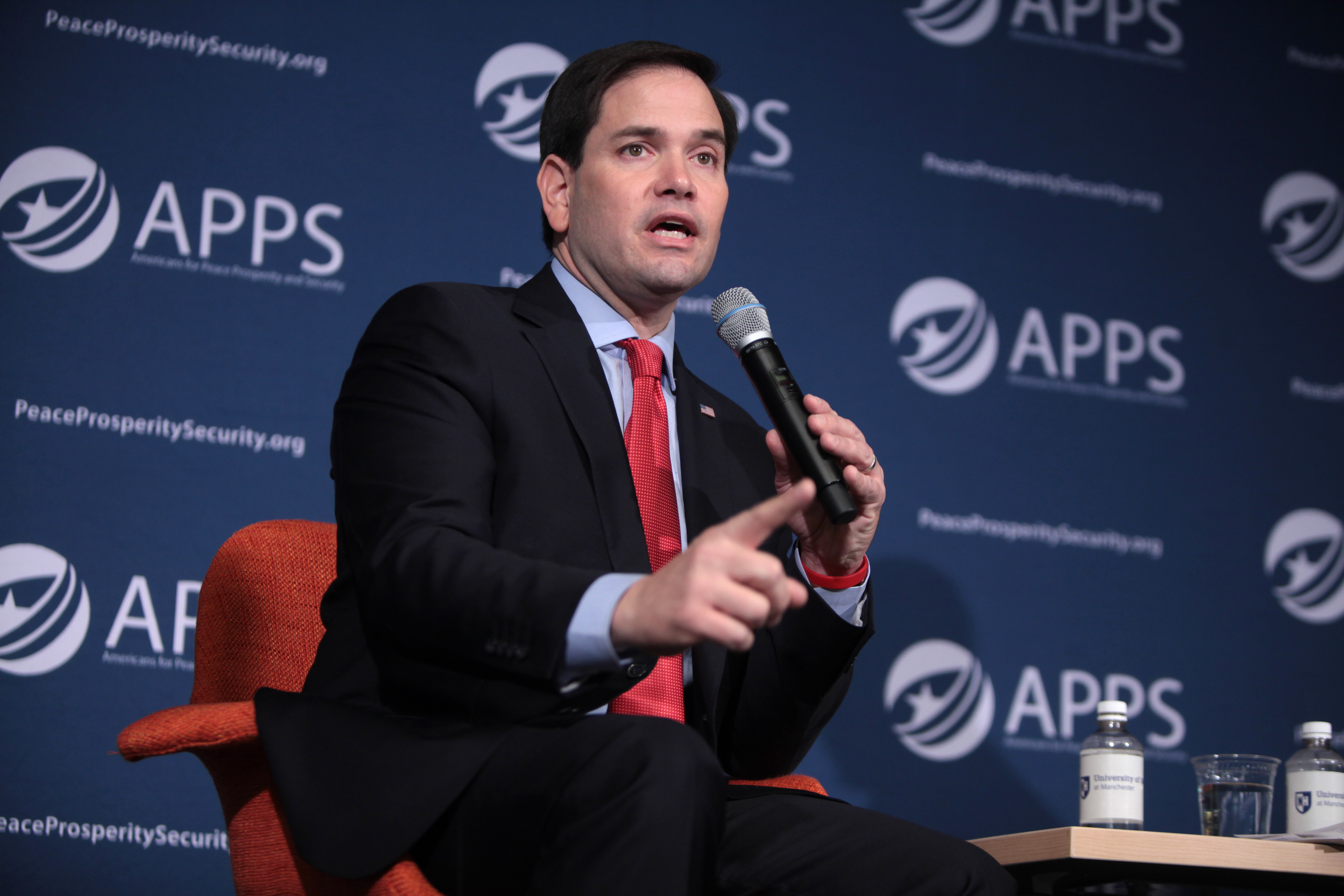
Senator Marco Rubio at a campaign event in Manchester

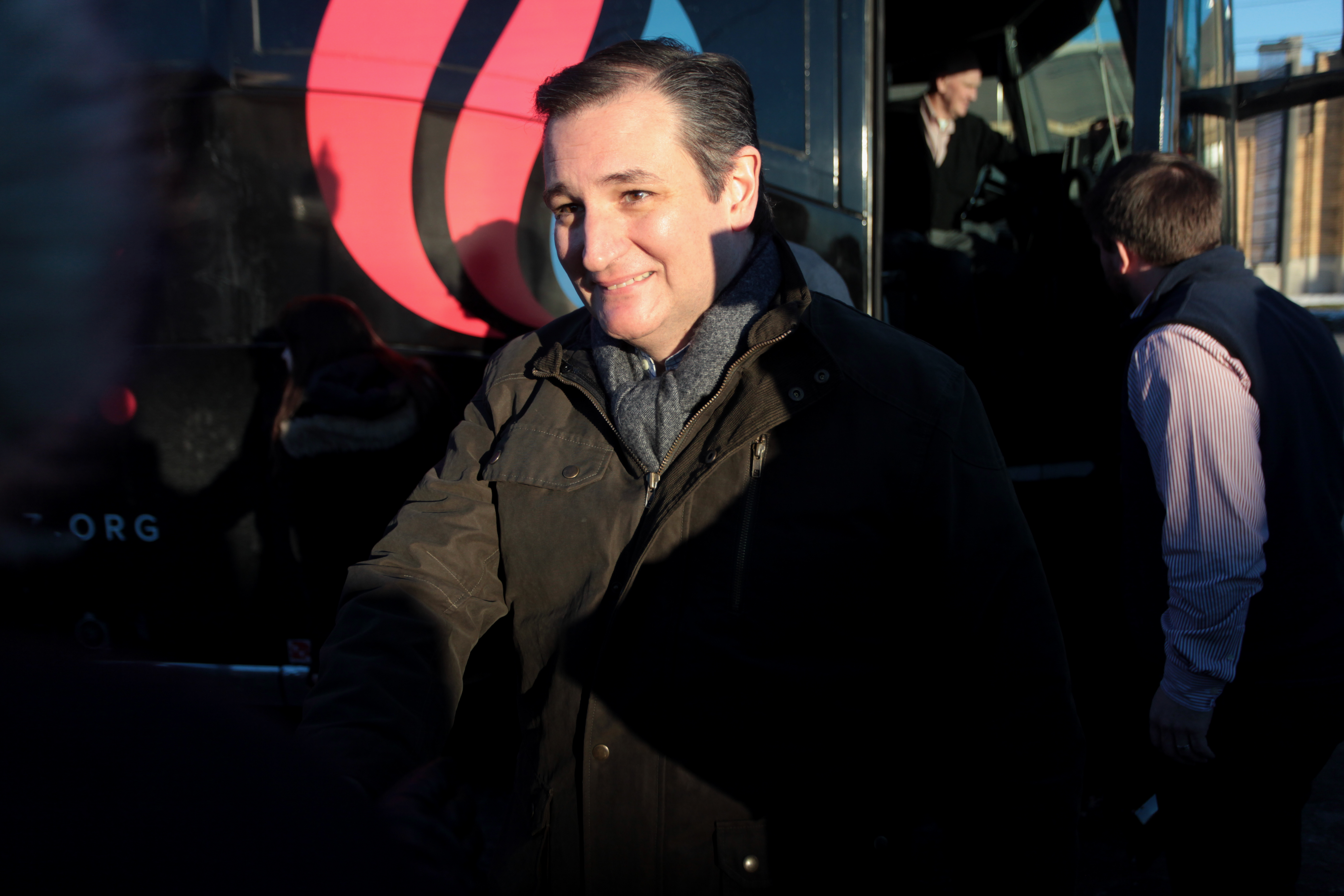
Senator Ted Cruz at a campaign event in Manchester

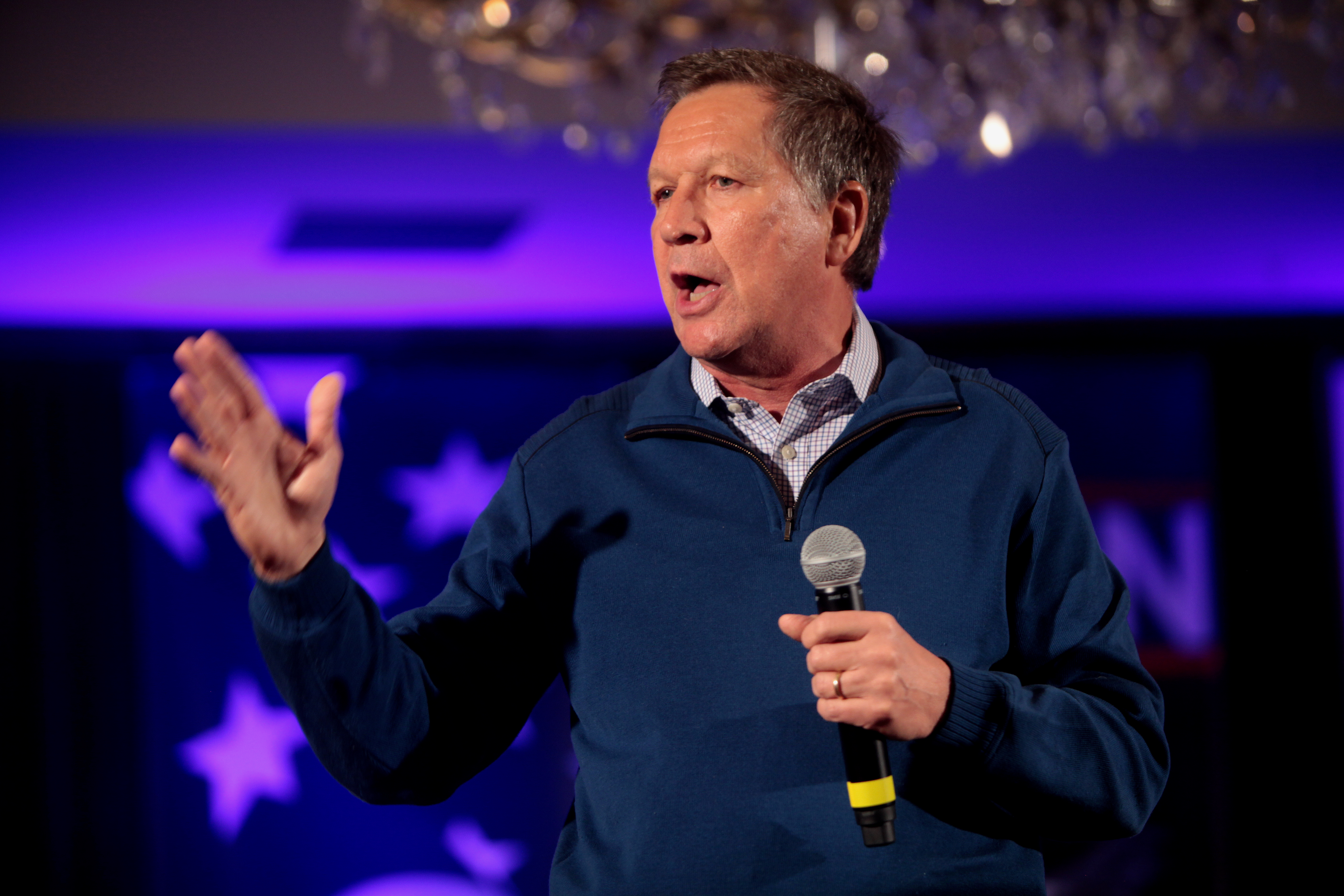
Governor John Kasich at a campaign event in Nashua

The New Hampshire Republican primary took place on February 9, 2016, where there were 23 bound delegates which were allocated proportionally and a candidate has to get at least 10% of the vote to get any delegates to the Republican National Convention.

==== Results ====
New Hampshire Republican primary, February 9, 2016
Candidate	Votes	Percentage	Actual delegate count		
Candidate	Votes	Percentage	Bound	Unbound	Total
Donald Trump	100,735	35.23%	11	0	11
John Kasich	44,932	15.72%	4	0	4
Ted Cruz	33,244	11.63%	3	0	3
Jeb Bush	31,341	10.96%	3	0	3
Marco Rubio	30,071	10.52%	2	0	2
Chris Christie	21,089	7.38%	0	0	0
Carly Fiorina	11,774	4.12%	0	0	0
Ben Carson	6,527	2.28%	0	0	0
Rand Paul (withdrawn)	1,930	0.68%	0	0	0
Write-ins	2,912	1.02%	0	0	0
Mike Huckabee (withdrawn)	216	0.08%	0	0	0
Andy Martin	202	0.07%	0	0	0
Rick Santorum (withdrawn)	160	0.06%	0	0	0
Jim Gilmore	134	0.05%	0	0	0
Richard Witz	104	0.04%	0	0	0
George Pataki (withdrawn)	79	0.03%	0	0	0
Lindsey Graham (withdrawn)	73	0.03%	0	0	0
Brooks Andrews Cullison	56	0.02%	0	0	0
Timothy Cook	55	0.02%	0	0	0
Bobby Jindal (withdrawn)	53	0.02%	0	0	0
Frank Lynch	47	0.02%	0	0	0
Joe Robinson	44	0.02%	0	0	0
Stephen Bradley Comley	32	0.01%	0	0	0
Chomi Prag	16	0.01%	0	0	0
Jacob Daniel Dyas	15	0.01%	0	0	0
Stephen John McCarthy	12	0%	0	0	0
Walter Iwachiw	9	0%	0	0	0
Kevin Glenn Huey	8	0%	0	0	0
Matt Drozd	6	0%	0	0	0
Robert Lawrence Mann	5	0%	0	0	0
Peter Messina	5	0%	0	0	0
Unprojected delegates:			0	0	0
Total:	285,916	100.00%	23	0	23
Source: The Green Papers

Note: Delegates were awarded to candidates who got 10% or more of the vote proportionally. Of the 25 candidate/hopefuls, five candidates garnered delegates.

=== By county ===
2016 New Hampshire Republican primaries (by county)
County	Donald Trump		John Kasich		Ted Cruz		Jeb Bush		Marco Rubio		Chris Christie		All Other Candidates (Note: Includes the vote totals of Carly Fiorina, Ben Carson, Rand Paul, Mike Huckabee, Rick Santorum, and any other write-in candidates or votes.)		Total
County	#	%	#	%	#	%	#	%	#	%	#	%	#	%	Total
Belknap	5,508	35.16%	2,464	15.73%	2,019	12.89%	1,741	11.11%	1,511	9.64%	1,002	6.40%	1,422	9.07%	15,667
Carroll	4,170	33.95%	2,279	18.55%	1,357	11.05%	1,240	10.09%	1,430	11.64%	883	7.19%	925	7.54%	12,284
Cheshire	4,533	33.42%	2,177	16.05%	1,888	13.92%	1,500	11.06%	1,237	9.12%	754	5.56%	1,473	10.87%	13,562
Coos	2,184	36.99%	943	15.97%	601	10.18%	562	9.52%	614	10.40%	355	6.01%	645	10.93%	5,904
Grafton	4,897	29.36%	3,475	20.83%	1,726	10.35%	1,864	11.17%	1,926	11.55%	1,068	6.40%	1,725	10.35%	16,681
Hillsborough	29,328	34.89%	12,517	14.89%	9,606	11.43%	9,584	11.40%	8,824	10.50%	7,155	8.51%	7,049	8.40%	84,063
Merrimack	10,959	33.02%	6,178	18.61%	3,781	11.39%	3,814	11.49%	3,062	9.23%	2,376	7.16%	3,022	9.11%	33,192
Rockingham	28,718	38.73%	10,370	13.98%	7,991	10.78%	7,748	10.45%	8,074	10.89%	5,783	7.80%	5,474	7.37%	74,158
Strafford	7,358	33.40%	3,195	14.50%	3,324	15.09%	2,444	11.10%	2,505	11.37%	1,225	5.56%	1,976	8.97%	22,027
Sullivan	3,080	36.73%	1,334	15.91%	951	11.34%	844	10.07%	888	10.59%	488	5.82%	800	9.54%	8,385
Totals	100,735	35.23%	44,932	15.71%	33,244	11.63%	31,341	10.96%	30,071	10.52%	21,089	7.38%	24,511	8.58%	285,923

== General election ==
=== Predictions ===
Source	Ranking	As of
Los Angeles Times	Likely D	November 6, 2016
CNN	Tossup	November 4, 2016
Cook Political Report	Lean D	November 7, 2016
Electoral-vote.com	Lean D	November 8, 2016
Rothenberg Political Report	Lean D	November 7, 2016
Sabato's Crystal Ball	Lean D	November 7, 2016
RealClearPolitics	Tossup	November 8, 2016
Fox News	Tossup	November 7, 2016

=== Polling ===
Up until late October 2016, Democrat Hillary Clinton won almost every pre-election poll. On November 1, just one week before the election, Republican Donald Trump won a poll for the first time, 44% to 42%. In the final week, Trump won 4 polls to Clinton's 2 and one tie. The final poll showed a 45% to 44% lead for Clinton, which was accurate compared to the results. The average of the final 3 polls showed Clinton up 45% to 42%.

=== Results ===
General election results, November 8, 2016
Party	Candidate	Votes	%
Democratic	Hillary Clinton	348,526	46.83%
Republican	Donald Trump	345,790	46.46%
Libertarian	Gary Johnson	30,694	4.13%
Green	Jill Stein	6,465	0.87%
Democratic	Bernie Sanders (write-in)	4,493	0.60%
Republican	John Kasich (write-in)	1,365	0.18%
Independent	Evan McMullin (write-in)	1,064	0.14%
Reform	Rocky De La Fuente	677	0.09%
Republican	Mitt Romney (write-in)	540	0.07%
Republican	Paul Ryan (write-in)	280	0.04%
Republican	Jeb Bush (write-in)	230	0.03%
Republican	Marco Rubio (write-in)	136	0.02%
Republican	Ted Cruz (write-in)	129	0.02%
Republican	John McCain (write-in)	127	0.02%
Libertarian	Ron Paul (write-in)	98	0.01%
Republican	Ben Carson (write-in)	83	0.01%
Libertarian	Vermin Supreme (write-in)	58	0.01%
Democratic	Joe Biden (write-in)	55	0.01%
Republican	Chris Christie (write-in)	23	0.00%
Total votes		743,117	100.00%

==== By county ====
County	Hillary Clinton Democratic		Donald Trump Republican		Various candidates Other parties		Margin		Total votes cast
County	#	%	#	%	#	%	#	%	Total votes cast
Belknap	13,517	38.57%	19,315	55.11%	2,213	6.32%	-5,798	-16.54%	35,045
Carroll	12,987	43.85%	14,635	49.42%	1,994	6.73%	-1,648	-5.57%	29,616
Cheshire	22,064	52.66%	16,876	40.28%	2,955	7.06%	5,188	12.38%	41,895
Coos	6,563	42.00%	7,952	50.89%	1,112	7.11%	-1,389	-8.89%	15,627
Grafton	28,510	55.69%	19,010	37.14%	3,671	7.17%	9,500	18.55%	51,191
Hillsborough	99,589	46.50%	100,013	46.70%	14,555	6.80%	-424	-0.20%	214,157
Merrimack	40,198	48.06%	37,674	45.04%	5,776	6.90%	2,524	3.02%	83,648
Rockingham	79,994	44.09%	90,447	49.85%	10,993	6.06%	-10,453	-5.76%	181,434
Strafford	34,894	50.57%	29,072	42.13%	5,034	7.30%	5,822	8.44%	69,000
Sullivan	10,210	45.01%	10,796	47.60%	1,677	7.39%	-586	-2.59%	22,683
Totals	348,526	46.83%	345,790	46.46%	49,980	6.71%	2,736	0.37%	744,296

Counties that flipped from Democratic to Republican

- Coös (largest city: Berlin)
- Hillsborough (largest city: Manchester)
- Sullivan (largest city: Claremont)

==== By congressional district ====
Clinton and Trump each won a congressional district, with Trump winning one that elected a Democrat.

District	Clinton	Trump	Representative
1st	46%	47%	Carol Shea-Porter
2nd	48%	45%	Ann McLane Kuster

== Analysis ==
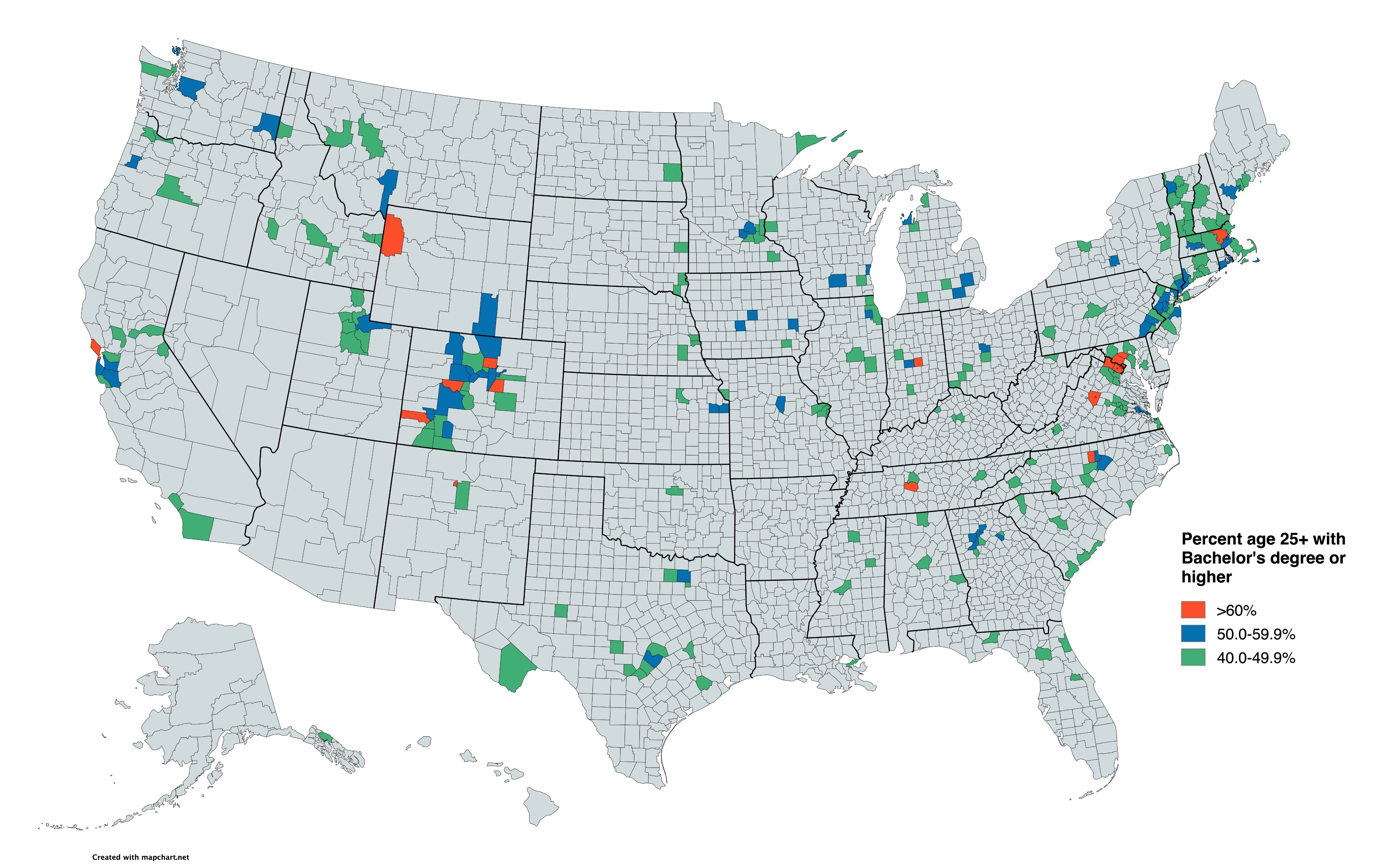
A map of the most college-educated counties in the United States

Hillary Clinton's margin of victory was the smallest for a Democrat in the state since Woodrow Wilson narrowly won it in 1916. New Hampshire last voted for a Republican, George W. Bush, in 2000, and although Trump did not win New Hampshire, the top-line county results were exactly the same in 2000 and 2016. This was the first time since 2000 that the Democratic presidential nominee did not win a majority of votes in New Hampshire.

A New England state, New Hampshire is one of the most educated states in the country. The swings in the most college-educated counties (see the map), including Grafton (home to Dartmouth College), Hillsborough, and Rockingham were small enough to narrowly keep the state in Clinton's column.

Despite Trump's narrow loss, this would be the first and only presidential election since 2000 where New Hampshire would vote more Republican than the national average, when the Republican candidate won more of the state's counties, along with the first time since 1976 when the winner of Coos County did not also carry the state as well. Coincidentally, New Hampshire voted as Republican in 2016 as it did Democratic in 2012 in comparison to the rest of the nation.

=== Allegations of voting irregularities ===
On September 7, 2017, state House speaker Shawn Jasper announced that data showed that 6,540 people voted using out-of-state licenses. Of those, only 15% had received state licenses by August 2017. Of the remaining 5,526, only 3.3% had registered a motor vehicle in New Hampshire. In addition to the close vote for president, Democratic Governor Maggie Hassan defeated incumbent Republican Senator Kelly Ayotte by 1,017 votes. In February 2017, President Trump had told a gathering of senators at the White House that fraudulent out-of-state voting had cost him and Ayotte the election in New Hampshire. Mainstream media disputed Trump's and Jasper's assertion. New Hampshire law permits New Hampshire residents to vote using out-of-state identification if they are domiciled in the state, out-of-state college students attending schools in New Hampshire being one example of such legitimate use of out-of-state identification.

Several investigations by New Hampshire's Ballot Law Commission found no evidence of widespread fraud, and only 4 instances of fraud total in the state for the 2016 elections. Specifically addressing the claim of people being bussed in from out of state to vote, Associate Attorney General Anne Edwards noted that they found no evidence for such claims. When they investigated these claims, they found that the buses were chartered out of state, but the voters on the buses lived in New Hampshire and could legally vote there.

== See also ==
- First presidency of Donald Trump
- United States presidential elections in New Hampshire
- 2016 Democratic Party presidential debates and forums
- 2016 Democratic Party presidential primaries
- 2016 Republican Party presidential debates and forums
- 2016 Republican Party presidential primaries
