= Rockingham County, New Hampshire =

County in New Hampshire, United States

- County
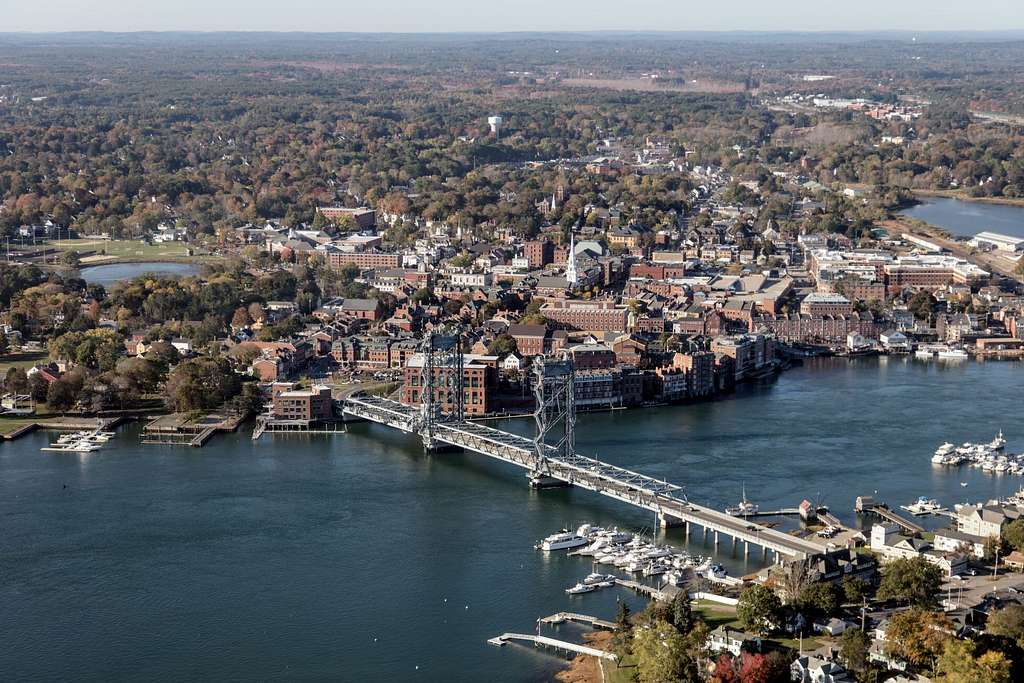
- Aerial view of Portsmouth

- Flag Seal

- Location within the U.S. state of New Hampshire
- Coordinates: 42°57′46″N 71°04′39″W
- Country: United States
- State: New Hampshire
- Founded: 1769
- Named for: Charles Watson-Wentworth, 2nd Marquess of Rockingham
- Seat: Brentwood
- Largest town: Derry

Area
  - Total: 795.2 sq mi (2,060 km^{2})
  - Land: 695.4 sq mi (1,801 km^{2})
  - Water: 99.9 sq mi (259 km^{2}) 12.6%

Population (2020)
  - Total: 314,176
  - Estimate (2025): 324,077 ▲
  - Density: 451.8/sq mi (174.4/km^{2})
- Time zone: UTC−5 (Eastern)
  - Summer (DST): UTC−4 (EDT)
- Congressional districts: 1st, 2nd
- Website: rockinghamcountynh.org

Rockingham County is the easternmost county in the U.S. state of New Hampshire. As of the 2020 census, the population was 314,176, making it New Hampshire's second-most populous county. The county seat is Brentwood. Rockingham County is part of the Boston-Cambridge-Newton, MA-NH Metropolitan Statistical Area and the greater Boston-Worcester-Providence, MA-RI-NH-CT Combined Statistical Area. Per the 2020 census, it was New Hampshire's fastest growing county from 2010 to 2020.

As of 2014–2018 estimates from the American Community Survey, Rockingham County was the fourth- wealthiest county in New England, with a median household income of $90,429.

== History ==
The area that today is Rockingham County was first settled by Europeans moving north from the Plymouth Colony in Massachusetts as early as 1623. The government was linked tightly with Massachusetts until New Hampshire became a separate colony in 1679, but counties were not introduced until 1769.

Rockingham was identified in 1769 as one of five original counties for the colony. It is named for Charles Watson-Wentworth, 2nd Marquess of Rockingham, who had been Prime Minister of the UK from 1765 to 1766. The county was organized in 1771, with its county seat at Exeter. In 1823, certain townships from northwestern Rockingham (and some northern townships from Hillsborough County) became part of the formation of Merrimack County. In 1844, its area was further reduced by the formation of Belknap County to the northwest. In 1997, the county court facilities were moved to Brentwood, a rural town adjacent to Exeter.

== Geography ==
The county occupies the southeastern corner of the state of New Hampshire, and it contains the state's easternmost point. The county contains all of New Hampshire's Atlantic coast, which, at approximately 18 miles (29 km), is the shortest ocean coastline of any state in the U.S. According to the U.S. Census Bureau, the county has an area of 795 square miles (2,060 km^{2}), of which 695 square miles (1,800 km^{2}) are land and 100 square miles (260 km^{2}) (13%) are water. Its highest point is Nottingham Mountain, at 1,340 feet (410 m), in Deerfield.

=== Adjacent counties ===
- Strafford County (north)
- York County, Maine (northeast)
- Essex County, Massachusetts (south)
- Hillsborough County (west)
- Merrimack County (northwest)

=== National protected area ===
- Great Bay National Wildlife Refuge

== Demographics ==
Historical population
Census	Pop.	Note	%±
1790	43,184		—
1800	45,427		5.2%
1810	50,175		10.5%
1820	55,246		10.1%
1830	44,325		−19.8%
1840	45,771		3.3%
1850	49,194		7.5%
1860	50,122		1.9%
1870	47,297		−5.6%
1880	49,064		3.7%
1890	49,650		1.2%
1900	51,118		3.0%
1910	52,188		2.1%
1920	52,498		0.6%
1930	53,750		2.4%
1940	58,142		8.2%
1950	70,059		20.5%
1960	99,029		41.4%
1970	138,951		40.3%
1980	190,345		37.0%
1990	245,845		29.2%
2000	277,359		12.8%
2010	295,223		6.4%
2020	314,176		6.4%
2025 (est.)	324,077	▲	3.2%
U.S. Decennial Census; 1790-1960 1900-1990; 1990-2000 2010-2020

=== 2020 census ===
As of the 2020 census, the county had a population of 314,176. The median age was 45.4 years. 19.1% of residents were under the age of 18 and 19.1% of residents were 65 years of age or older. For every 100 females there were 97.2 males, and for every 100 females age 18 and over there were 95.6 males age 18 and over.

The racial makeup of the county was 90.9% White, 0.7% Black or African American, 0.1% American Indian and Alaska Native, 2.0% Asian, 0.0% Native Hawaiian and Pacific Islander, 1.2% from some other race, and 4.9% from two or more races. Hispanic or Latino residents of any race comprised 3.3% of the population.

71.0% of residents lived in urban areas, while 29.0% lived in rural areas.

There were 125,787 households in the county, of which 27.4% had children under the age of 18 living with them and 21.8% had a female householder with no spouse or partner present. About 24.6% of all households were made up of individuals and 11.0% had someone living alone who was 65 years of age or older.

There were 135,338 housing units, of which 7.1% were vacant. Among occupied housing units, 77.1% were owner-occupied and 22.9% were renter-occupied. The homeowner vacancy rate was 0.8% and the rental vacancy rate was 4.6%.

Rockingham County, New Hampshire – Racial and ethnic composition Note: the US Census treats Hispanic/Latino as an ethnic category. This table excludes Latinos from the racial categories and assigns them to a separate category. Hispanics/Latinos may be of any race.
Race / Ethnicity (NH = Non-Hispanic)	Pop 2000	Pop 2010	Pop 2020	% 2000	% 2010	% 2020
White alone (NH)	266,424	278,011	283,099	96.05%	94.16%	90.10%
Black or African American alone (NH)	1,497	1,790	2,076	0.53%	0.60%	0.66%
Native American or Alaska Native alone (NH)	445	418	342	0.16%	0.14%	0.10%
Asian alone (NH)	3,066	4,910	6,247	1.10%	1.66%	1.98%
Pacific Islander alone (NH)	93	93	79	0.03%	0.03%	0.02%
Other race alone (NH)	240	348	1,236	0.08%	0.11%	0.39%
Mixed race or Multiracial (NH)	2,280	3,511	10,840	0.82%	1.18%	3.45%
Hispanic or Latino (any race)	3,314	6,142	10,257	1.19%	2.08%	3.26%
Total	277,359	295,223	314,176	100.00%	100.00%	100.00%

=== 2010 census ===
As of the census of 2010, there were 295,223 people, 115,033 households, and 79,832 families living in the county. The population density was 425.0 inhabitants per square mile (164.1/km^{2}). There were 126,709 housing units at an average density of 182.4 per square mile (70.4/km^{2}). The racial makeup of the county was 95.5% white, 1.7% Asian, 0.7% black or African American, 0.2% American Indian, 0.6% from other races, and 1.4% from two or more races. Those of Hispanic or Latino origin made up 2.1% of the population. In terms of ancestry, 26.9% were Irish, 19.0% were English, 14.8% were Italian, 9.7% were German, 7.3% were French Canadian, 5.6% were Polish, and 3.8% were American.

Of the 115,033 households, 32.9% had children under the age of 18 living with them, 56.4% were married couples living together, 8.9% had a female householder with no husband present, 30.6% were non-families, and 23.5% of all households were made up of individuals. The average household size was 2.54 and the average family size was 3.03. The median age was 42.2 years.

The median income for a household in the county was $75,825 and the median income for a family was $90,463. Males had a median income of $61,443 versus $42,478 for females. The per capita income for the county was $35,889. About 3.0% of families and 4.7% of the population were below the poverty line, including 4.9% of those under age 18 and 6.0% of those age 65 or over.

=== 2000 census ===
As of the census of 2000, there were 277,359 people, 104,529 households, and 74,320 families living in the county. The population density was 399 inhabitants per square mile (154/km^{2}). There were 113,023 housing units at an average density of 163 per square mile (63/km^{2}). The racial makeup of the county was 96.80% White, 0.58% Black or African American, 0.18% Native American, 1.11% Asian, 0.04% Pacific Islander, 0.38% from other races, and 0.92% from two or more races. 1.19% of the population were Hispanic or Latino of any race. 18.1% were of Irish, 14.6% English, 11.8% Italian, 10.5% French, 8.0% French Canadian, 6.0% German and 5.6% American ancestry. 94.3% spoke English, 1.8% French and 1.3% Spanish as their first language.

There were 104,529 households, out of which 35.90% had children under the age of 18 living with them, 59.50% were married couples living together, 8.20% had a female householder with no husband present, and 28.90% were non-families. 22.00% of all households were made up of individuals, and 7.00% had someone living alone who was 65 years of age or older. The average household size was 2.63 and the average family size was 3.11.

In the county, the population was spread out, with 26.40% under the age of 18, 6.20% from 18 to 24, 32.80% from 25 to 44, 24.40% from 45 to 64, and 10.10% who were 65 years of age or older. The median age was 37 years. For every 100 females, there were 97.40 males. For every 100 females age 18 and over, there were 95.40 males.

The median income for a household in the county was $58,150, and the median income for a family was $66,345. (These figures had risen to $72,600 and $85,361 respectively, as of a 2007 estimate.) Males had a median income of $45,598 versus $30,741 for females. The per capita income for the county was $26,656. About 3.10% of families and 4.50% of the population were below the poverty line, including 5.00% of those under age 18 and 6.40% of those age 65 or over.

== Politics and government ==
Rockingham County has historically been a Republican stronghold, but the county is now competitive. Three Democratic presidential nominees have won it since 1964, including Joe Biden in 2020, who was the first to win a majority since Lyndon B. Johnson.

The county is divided between the Democratic stronghold that is the Seacoast Region, and the conservative western portions of the county.

Rockingham County is one of only thirteen counties to have voted for Obama in 2008, Romney in 2012, Trump in 2016, and Biden in 2020. (Note: The other eleven are Butte County, California; Teton County, Idaho; Kent County, Maryland; Kendall County, Illinois; McLean County, Illinois; Tippecanoe County, Indiana; Kent County, Michigan; Leelanau County, Michigan; Carroll County, New Hampshire; Marion County, Oregon; Grand County, Utah; and Albany County, Wyoming.)

United States presidential election results for Rockingham County, New Hampshire
Year	Republican		Democratic		Third party(ies)	
Year	No.	%	No.	%	No.	%
1876	6,422	53.51%	5,576	46.46%	3	0.02%
1880	6,960	53.25%	5,989	45.82%	121	0.93%
1884	6,162	50.63%	5,682	46.69%	326	2.68%
1888	6,450	48.76%	6,553	49.54%	226	1.71%
1892	6,380	50.75%	5,961	47.42%	230	1.83%
1896	7,881	69.32%	2,992	26.32%	496	4.36%
1900	7,363	59.29%	4,719	38.00%	337	2.71%
1904	7,216	60.97%	4,320	36.50%	299	2.53%
1908	6,814	60.34%	4,118	36.47%	361	3.20%
1912	4,231	37.54%	4,306	38.21%	2,733	24.25%
1916	5,866	50.29%	5,637	48.32%	162	1.39%
1920	13,811	67.29%	6,582	32.07%	132	0.64%
1924	14,530	68.42%	6,073	28.60%	634	2.99%
1928	17,590	69.18%	7,782	30.61%	53	0.21%
1932	14,902	56.44%	11,363	43.03%	140	0.53%
1936	15,466	54.75%	12,207	43.21%	576	2.04%
1940	16,223	53.68%	14,001	46.32%	0	0.00%
1944	17,144	56.55%	13,170	43.44%	2	0.01%
1948	18,890	60.68%	11,937	38.35%	301	0.97%
1952	26,280	68.58%	12,040	31.42%	0	0.00%
1956	28,226	73.42%	10,198	26.53%	18	0.05%
1960	28,032	62.16%	17,063	37.84%	0	0.00%
1964	19,498	41.70%	27,256	58.30%	0	0.00%
1968	28,842	54.98%	21,195	40.41%	2,419	4.61%
1972	38,825	63.09%	21,998	35.75%	718	1.17%
1976	36,738	53.92%	30,051	44.11%	1,341	1.97%
1980	45,960	57.83%	21,712	27.32%	11,802	14.85%
1984	57,586	69.01%	25,557	30.63%	297	0.36%
1988	64,034	63.15%	35,775	35.28%	1,596	1.57%
1992	47,353	38.25%	44,317	35.80%	32,136	25.96%
1996	46,201	40.80%	53,644	47.37%	13,403	11.84%
2000	65,860	49.09%	61,628	45.93%	6,685	4.98%
2004	82,069	51.68%	75,437	47.50%	1,310	0.82%
2008	81,917	48.81%	83,723	49.89%	2,182	1.30%
2012	87,921	51.59%	80,142	47.03%	2,360	1.38%
2016	90,447	49.85%	79,994	44.09%	10,993	6.06%
2020	95,858	48.09%	100,064	50.20%	3,420	1.72%
2024	102,539	50.53%	97,611	48.10%	2,780	1.37%

=== County Commission ===
The executive power of Rockingham County's government is held by three county commissioners, each representing one of the three commissioner districts within the county.

Districts	Name	Hometown	Party
District 1	Kate Coyle	Portsmouth, NH	Democratic
District 2	Steven L. Goddu	Salem, NH	Republican
District 3	Thomas Tombarello	Sandown, NH	Republican

In addition to the County Commission, there are five directly elected officials: they include County Attorney, Register of Deeds, County Sheriff, Register of Probate, and County Treasurer.

Office	Name
County Attorney	Patricia Conway (R)
Register of Deeds	Cathy Stacey (R)
County Sheriff	Chuck Massahos (R)
Register of Probate	Lisa Massahos (R)
County Treasurer	Scott Priestley (R)

=== Legislative branch ===
The legislative branch of Rockingham County is made up of the members of the New Hampshire House of Representatives from the county. In total, as of August 2018 there are 90 members from 37 different districts.

Affiliation	Members	Voting share
Democratic Party	29	32.2%
Republican Party	61	67.8%
Total	90	100%

After redistricting based on the 2010 United States census, Rockingham County was split between 8 state senate districts:

District	Areas of Rockingham County	Senator	Party	First elected	Residence
14	Auburn, Londonderry	Sharon Carson	Republican	2010	Londonderry
16	Candia	Kevin Cavanaugh	Democratic	2017	Manchester
17	Deerfield, Northwood, Nottingham, Raymond	John Reagan	Republican	2012	Deerfield
19	Derry, Hampstead, Windham	Regina Birdsell	Republican	2014	Hampstead
21	Newfields, Newington, Newmarket, Portsmouth	Rebecca Perkins Kwoka	Democratic	2020	Portsmouth
22	Atkinson, Plaistow, Salem	Chuck Morse	Republican	2010	Salem
23	Brentwood, Chester, Danville, East Kingston, Epping, Exeter, Fremont, Kingston, Sandown	Bill Gannon	Republican	2020	Sandown
24	Greenland, Hampton, Hampton Falls, Kensington, New Castle, Newton, North Hampton, Rye, Seabrook, Stratham, South Hampton	Tom Sherman	Democratic	2018	Rye

== Attractions ==
Strawbery Banke Museum in Portsmouth is a collection of historic buildings from the 17th through 19th centuries. Canobie Lake Park, in Salem, is an amusement park that opened in 1902. Rockingham Park racetrack, which featured weekly horse racing until 2009, was also in Salem. The site of the former track, next to the Mall at Rockingham Park, is being redeveloped as Tuscan Village, a mixed-use development. America's Stonehenge, which claims to be a pre-Columbian collection of stone structures, is in northern Salem. Derry was home to poet Robert Frost, who taught at nearby Pinkerton Academy. His home, the Robert Frost Farm, has been preserved as a state park.

Rockingham County is also home to New Hampshire's entire seacoast and features several popular resort towns. Hampton Beach has a boardwalk and Hampton Beach Casino Ballroom. Rye features several undeveloped beaches such as Odiorne Point State Park and contains New Hampshire's portion of the Isles of Shoals. Seabrook contains Seabrook Greyhound Park and the Seabrook Nuclear Power Plant, the last nuclear plant opened in the United States.

== Communities ==
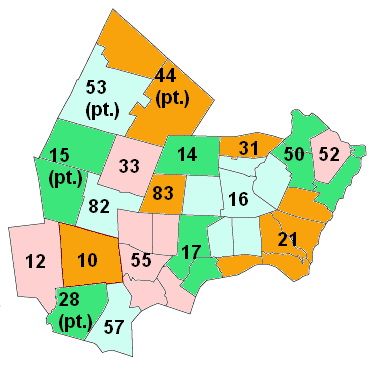
Map of school administrative units in Rockingham County

=== City ===
- Portsmouth

=== Towns ===
- Atkinson
- Auburn
- Brentwood (county seat)
- Candia
- Chester
- Danville
- Deerfield
- Derry
- East Kingston
- Epping
- Exeter
- Fremont
- Greenland
- Hampstead
- Hampton
- Hampton Falls
- Kensington
- Kingston
- Londonderry
- New Castle
- Newfields
- Newington
- Newmarket
- Newton
- North Hampton
- Northwood
- Nottingham
- Plaistow
- Raymond
- Rye
- Salem
- Sandown
- Seabrook
- South Hampton
- Stratham
- Windham

=== Census-designated places ===
- Derry
- Epping
- Exeter
- Hampton
- Hampton Beach
- Londonderry
- Newfields
- Newmarket
- Raymond
- Seabrook Beach

=== Villages ===
- Candia Four Corners
- East Candia
- East Derry
- East Hampstead
- Newton Junction
- North Salem
- West Nottingham

== Education ==
School districts include:

K-12 districts

- Epping School District
- Londonderry School District
- Newmarket School District
- Portsmouth School District
- Raymond School District
- Salem School District
- Sanborn Regional School District
- Timberlane Regional School District
- Windham School District

Secondary districts

- Exeter Regional Cooperative School District
- Winnacunnet Cooperative School District

Elementary districts

- Auburn School District
- Brentwood School District
- Candia School District
- Chester School District
- Deerfield School District
- Derry School District
- East Kingston School District
- Exeter School District
- Fremont School District
- Greenland School District
- Hampstead School District
- Hampton School District
- Hampton Falls School District
- Kensington School District
- New Castle School District
- Newfields School District
- Newington School District
- North Hampton School District
- Northwood School District
- Nottingham School District
- Rye School District
- Seabrook School District
- South Hampton School District
- Stratham School District

There is also a privately endowed, publicly funded school, Pinkerton Academy in Derry. Towns in Rockingham County that send their public high school students to Pinkerton, other than Derry, include Auburn, Candia, Chester, and Hampstead. Prior to 1978 Londonderry sent its high schoolers to Pinkerton. Previously Auburn and Candia sent high school students to the Manchester School District.

== Notable people ==
- Karoline Claire Leavitt (born 1997), 36th White House Press Secretary
- Annie Bartlett Shepard (1861–1944), anti women's suffrage activist and founder of a chapter of the Daughters of the American Revolution (DAR)
- Robert W. Wiley (born 1963), politician
- The Brave Little Abacus emo band

== See also ==
- National Register of Historic Places listings in Rockingham County, New Hampshire
