= Sullivan County, New Hampshire =

County in New Hampshire, United States

- County
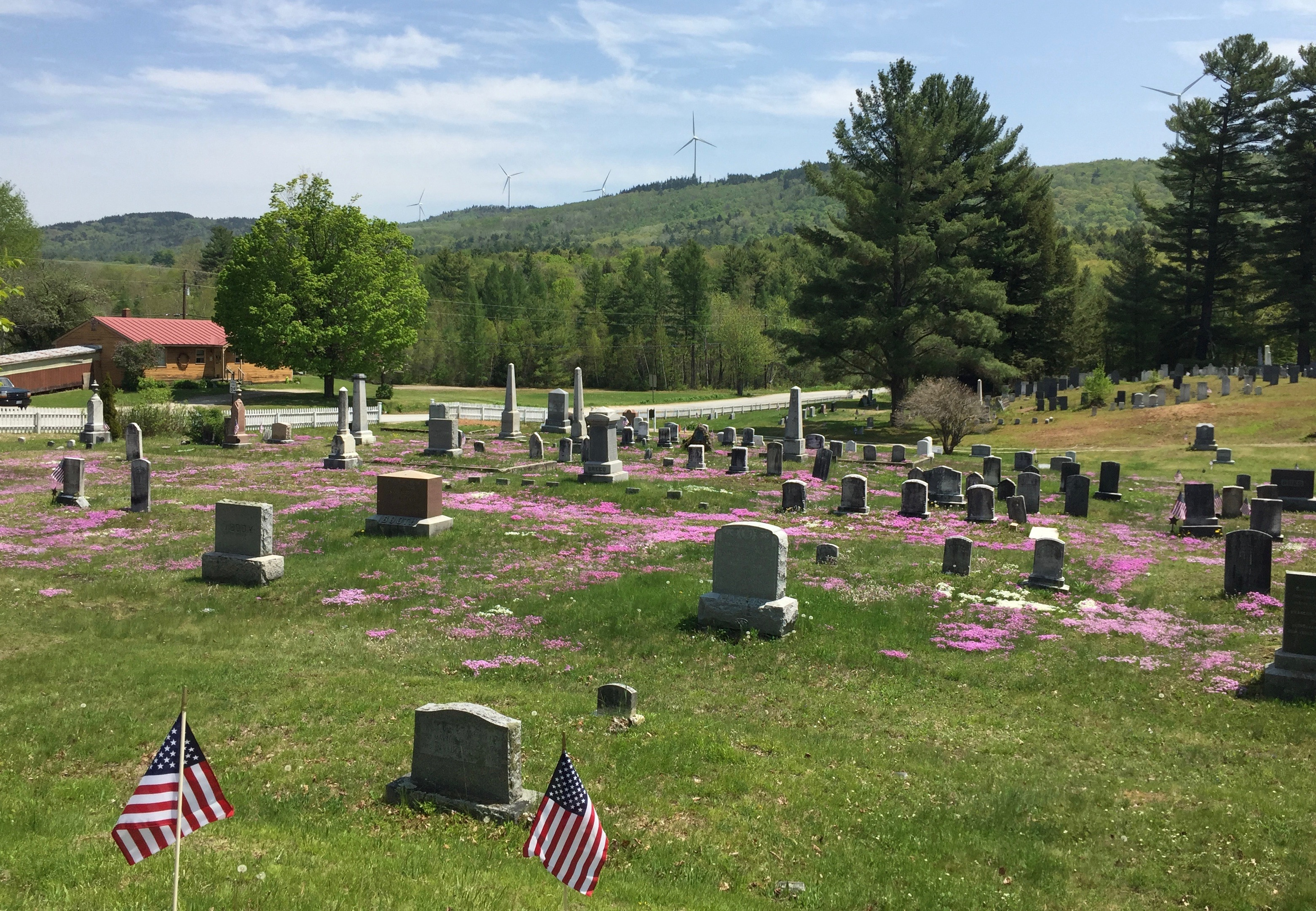
- Lempster Mountain Wind Power Project overlooking cemetery in East Lempster, NH

- Seal

- Location within the U.S. state of New Hampshire
- Coordinates: 43°20′39″N 72°14′50″W
- Country: United States
- State: New Hampshire
- Founded: 1827
- Named for: John Sullivan
- Seat: Newport
- Largest city: Claremont

Area
  - Total: 552.1 sq mi (1,430 km^{2})
  - Land: 537.5 sq mi (1,392 km^{2})
  - Water: 14.6 sq mi (38 km^{2}) 2.6%

Population (2020)
  - Total: 43,063
  - Estimate (2025): 43,961 ▲
  - Density: 80.1/sq mi (30.9/km^{2})
- Time zone: UTC−5 (Eastern)
  - Summer (DST): UTC−4 (EDT)
- Congressional district: 2nd
- Website: sullivancountynh.gov

Sullivan County is a county in the U.S. state of New Hampshire. As of the 2020 census, the population was 43,063, making it the second-least populous county in New Hampshire. Its county seat is Newport.

Sullivan County is included in the Claremont-Lebanon, NH-VT Micropolitan Statistical Area.

== History ==
Sullivan County was organized at Newport in 1827 from the northern portion of Cheshire County. It is named for John Sullivan (1740–1795), the Revolutionary War hero and a former governor.

== Geography ==
According to the U.S. Census Bureau, the county has a total area of 552 square miles (1,430 km^{2}), of which 537 square miles (1,390 km^{2}) is land and 15 square miles (39 km^{2}) (2.7%) is water. It is the third-smallest county in New Hampshire by area.

=== Adjacent counties ===
- Grafton County (north)
- Merrimack County (east)
- Hillsborough County (southeast)
- Cheshire County (south)
- Windham County, Vermont (southwest)
- Windsor County, Vermont (west)

=== National protected area ===
- Saint-Gaudens National Historic Site

== Demographics ==
Historical population
Census	Pop.	Note	%±
1830	19,669		—
1840	20,340		3.4%
1850	19,375		−4.7%
1860	19,041		−1.7%
1870	18,058		−5.2%
1880	18,161		0.6%
1890	17,304		−4.7%
1900	18,009		4.1%
1910	19,337		7.4%
1920	20,922		8.2%
1930	24,286		16.1%
1940	25,442		4.8%
1950	26,441		3.9%
1960	28,067		6.1%
1970	30,949		10.3%
1980	36,063		16.5%
1990	38,592		7.0%
2000	40,458		4.8%
2010	43,742		8.1%
2020	43,063		−1.6%
2025 (est.)	43,961	▲	2.1%
U.S. Decennial Census; 1790-1960 1900-1990; 1990-2000 2010-2018

=== 2020 census ===
As of the 2020 census, the county had a population of 43,063. The median age was 47.2 years. 18.7% of residents were under the age of 18 and 22.5% of residents were 65 years of age or older. For every 100 females there were 99.1 males, and for every 100 females age 18 and over there were 98.1 males age 18 and over.

The racial makeup of the county was 91.5% White, 0.5% Black or African American, 0.4% American Indian and Alaska Native, 0.9% Asian, 0.0% Native Hawaiian and Pacific Islander, 0.7% from some other race, and 6.0% from two or more races. Hispanic or Latino residents of any race comprised 1.9% of the population.

21.9% of residents lived in urban areas, while 78.1% lived in rural areas.

There were 18,164 households in the county, of which 24.8% had children under the age of 18 living with them and 23.0% had a female householder with no spouse or partner present. About 27.7% of all households were made up of individuals and 12.8% had someone living alone who was 65 years of age or older.

There were 21,797 housing units, of which 16.7% were vacant. Among occupied housing units, 72.8% were owner-occupied and 27.2% were renter-occupied. The homeowner vacancy rate was 1.6% and the rental vacancy rate was 5.5%.

Sullivan County, New Hampshire – Racial and ethnic composition Note: the US Census treats Hispanic/Latino as an ethnic category. This table excludes Latinos from the racial categories and assigns them to a separate category. Hispanics/Latinos may be of any race.
Race / Ethnicity (NH = Non-Hispanic)	Pop 2000	Pop 2010	Pop 2020	% 2000	% 2010	% 2020
White alone (NH)	39,482	42,087	39,123	97.58%	96.81%	90.85%
Black or African American alone (NH)	93	175	185	0.22%	0.40%	0.42%
Native American or Alaska Native alone (NH)	115	118	134	0.28%	0.27%	0.31%
Asian alone (NH)	150	270	403	0.37%	0.62%	0.93%
Pacific Islander alone (NH)	9	4	6	0.02%	0.00%	0.01%
Other race alone (NH)	27	30	181	0.06%	0.06%	0.42%
Mixed race or Multiracial (NH)	361	565	2,209	0.89%	1.29%	5.12%
Hispanic or Latino (any race)	221	493	822	0.54%	1.13%	1.90%
Total	40,458	43,742	43,063	100.00%	100.00%	100.00%

=== 2010 census ===
As of the 2010 United States census, there were 43,742 people, 18,126 households, and 12,025 families living in the county. The population density was 81.4 inhabitants per square mile (31.4/km^{2}). There were 22,341 housing units at an average density of 41.6 per square mile (16.1/km^{2}). The racial makeup of the county was 97.0% white, 0.6% Asian, 0.4% black or African American, 0.3% American Indian, 0.3% from other races, and 1.4% from two or more races. Those of Hispanic or Latino origin made up 1.1% of the population. In terms of ancestry, 23.9% were English, 16.3% were Irish, 9.2% were German, 7.1% were Italian, 6.0% were French Canadian, 5.2% were Scottish, 5.1% were Polish, and 4.4% were American.

Of the 18,126 households, 28.5% had children under the age of 18 living with them, 51.3% were married couples living together, 9.9% had a female householder with no husband present, 33.7% were non-families, and 26.1% of all households were made up of individuals. The average household size was 2.37 and the average family size was 2.82. The median age was 43.9 years.

The median income for a household in the county was $50,689 and the median income for a family was $61,959. Males had a median income of $44,408 versus $34,233 for females. The per capita income for the county was $26,322. About 7.5% of families and 10.0% of the population were below the poverty line, including 12.6% of those under age 18 and 7.9% of those age 65 or over.

=== 2000 census ===
At the 2000 census, there were 40,458 people, 16,530 households and 11,174 families living in the county. The population density was 29/; (75/sq mi). There were 20,158 housing units at an average density of 38 units per square mile (15/km^{2}). The racial makeup of the county was 97.99% White, 0.24% Black or African American, 0.29% Native American, 0.37% Asian, 0.02% Pacific Islander, 0.14% from other races, and 0.94% from two or more races. 0.55% of the population were Hispanic or Latino of any race. 16.9% were of English, 14.7% French, 11.7% French Canadian, 10.7% American, 10.0% Irish, 6.2% German and 5.1% Italian ancestry. 96.1% spoke English and 1.6% French as their first language.

There were 16,530 households, of which 29.40% had children under the age of 18 living with them, 54.70% were married couples living together, 8.60% had a female householder with no husband present, and 32.40% were non-families. 25.70% of all households were made up of individuals, and 10.90% had someone living alone who was 65 years of age or older. The average household size was 2.41 and the average family size was 2.88.

23.90% of the population were under the age of 18, 6.40% from 18 to 24, 28.00% from 25 to 44, 25.90% from 45 to 64, and 15.80% who were 65 years of age or older. The median age was 40 years. For every 100 females there were 97.10 males. For every 100 females age 18 and over, there were 93.50 males.

The median household income was $40,938 and the median family income was $48,516. Males had a median income of $32,185 versus $24,615 for females. The per capita income for the county was $21,319. About 5.20% of families and 8.50% of the population were below the poverty line, including 9.50% of those under age 18 and 8.80% of those age 65 or over.

== Politics and government ==
Sullivan County is a bellwether county, having voted for the winner of nearly every presidential election winner since 1964, except in 1976 and 2004.

United States presidential election results for Sullivan County, New Hampshire
Year	Republican		Democratic		Third party(ies)	
Year	No.	%	No.	%	No.	%
1876	2,568	54.91%	2,106	45.03%	3	0.06%
1880	2,729	55.46%	2,175	44.20%	17	0.35%
1884	2,477	53.95%	2,031	44.24%	83	1.81%
1888	2,588	54.95%	2,040	43.31%	82	1.74%
1892	2,434	53.84%	2,021	44.70%	66	1.46%
1896	2,750	71.45%	865	22.47%	234	6.08%
1900	2,559	61.43%	1,538	36.92%	69	1.66%
1904	2,774	64.21%	1,447	33.50%	99	2.29%
1908	2,758	63.21%	1,469	33.67%	136	3.12%
1912	1,677	38.85%	1,523	35.28%	1,117	25.87%
1916	2,193	49.33%	2,215	49.82%	38	0.85%
1920	4,647	64.35%	2,521	34.91%	54	0.75%
1924	5,187	68.03%	2,268	29.74%	170	2.23%
1928	5,754	61.57%	3,549	37.97%	43	0.46%
1932	5,153	53.79%	4,368	45.60%	58	0.61%
1936	5,347	50.74%	5,113	48.52%	78	0.74%
1940	5,583	48.74%	5,872	51.26%	0	0.00%
1944	5,935	49.82%	5,972	50.13%	6	0.05%
1948	6,003	55.49%	4,696	43.41%	119	1.10%
1952	8,317	63.68%	4,743	36.32%	0	0.00%
1956	8,403	66.44%	4,239	33.52%	5	0.04%
1960	7,105	52.34%	6,469	47.66%	0	0.00%
1964	3,975	31.15%	8,787	68.85%	0	0.00%
1968	6,094	49.43%	5,817	47.19%	417	3.38%
1972	7,901	58.13%	5,554	40.86%	137	1.01%
1976	6,679	50.57%	6,323	47.88%	205	1.55%
1980	7,472	52.85%	4,889	34.58%	1,776	12.56%
1984	9,220	64.75%	4,962	34.85%	57	0.40%
1988	8,836	57.82%	6,378	41.73%	69	0.45%
1992	6,318	35.50%	7,921	44.50%	3,560	20.00%
1996	6,824	39.54%	8,380	48.55%	2,056	11.91%
2000	9,304	49.84%	8,224	44.05%	1,140	6.11%
2004	10,142	46.51%	11,434	52.44%	228	1.05%
2008	9,169	40.30%	13,249	58.23%	336	1.48%
2012	9,269	42.45%	12,166	55.71%	402	1.84%
2016	10,796	47.60%	10,210	45.01%	1,677	7.39%
2020	11,508	47.08%	12,390	50.69%	546	2.23%
2024	12,484	49.50%	12,317	48.84%	420	1.67%

=== County Commission ===
The executive power of Sullivan County's government is held by three county commissioners, each representing one of the three commissioner districts within the county.

District	Commissioner	Hometown	Party
1	Joe Osgood	Claremont	Republican
2	Ben Nelson	Grantham	Republican
3	George Hebert	Goshen	Republican

In addition to the County Commission, there are five directly elected officials: they include County Attorney, Register of Deeds, County Sheriff, Register of Probate, and County Treasurer.

Office	Name
County Attorney	Marc Hathaway (R)
Register of Deeds	Janet Gibson (R)
County Sheriff	John Simonds (R)
Register of Probate	Rodd Ward (R)
County Treasurer	Michael Sanderson (R)

=== General court ===
The general court delegation from Sullivan County is made up of all of the members of the New Hampshire House of Representatives from the county. In total there are 13 members from 11 different districts. The party distribution of representatives after the 2022 elections is as follows.

Affiliation	Members	Voting share
Democratic Party	6	46.2%
Republican Party	7	53.8%
Total	13	100%

== Communities ==
=== City ===
- Claremont

=== Towns ===
- Acworth
- Charlestown
- Cornish
- Croydon
- Goshen
- Grantham
- Langdon
- Lempster
- Newport (county seat)
- Plainfield
- Springfield
- Sunapee
- Unity
- Washington

=== Census-designated places ===
- Charlestown
- Newport
- Plainfield

=== Other populated places ===
- Balloch
- Cornish Flat
- East Lempster
- Georges Mills
- Guild
- Meriden
- South Acworth

== Geographical features ==
=== Lakes ===
- Ashuelot Pond
- Eastman Pond
- Highland Lake
- Lake Sunapee
- Little Sunapee Lake

=== Mountains ===
- Lovewell Mountain
- Mount Sunapee

== County services ==
The Sullivan County Department of Corrections operates the county prison in the town of Unity.

== See also ==
- National Register of Historic Places listings in Sullivan County, New Hampshire
