= 1984 United States presidential election in New Hampshire =

- November 6, 1984

Nominee	Ronald Reagan	Walter Mondale
Party	Republican	Democratic
Home state	California	Minnesota
Running mate	George H. W. Bush	Geraldine Ferraro
Electoral vote	4	0
Popular vote	267,051	120,395
Percentage	68.66%	30.95%

Reagan
50–60%
60–70%
70–80%
80–90%
90–100%
Mondale
50–60%
80–90%
90–100%
President before election
Ronald Reagan
Republican
Elected President
Ronald Reagan
Republican

The 1984 United States presidential election in New Hampshire took place on November 6, 1984, as part of the 1984 United States presidential election, which was held throughout all 50 states and D.C. Voters chose four representatives, or electors to the Electoral College, who voted for president and vice president.

New Hampshire overwhelmingly voted for incumbent Republican President Ronald Reagan of California over his Democratic challenger, former Vice President Walter Mondale of Minnesota. Reagan ran with incumbent Vice President George H.W. Bush of Texas, while Mondale's running mate was Congresswoman Geraldine Ferraro of New York.

Reagan took 68.66% of the vote to Mondale's 30.95%, a margin of 37.71%. Reagan also swept every county in New Hampshire with over 60% of the vote. His victory in the popular vote made New Hampshire his fifth strongest state in the 1984 election after Utah, Idaho, Nebraska and Wyoming.

New Hampshire weighed in as about 19% more Republican than the national average.

Reagan's 68.66% of the vote in New Hampshire is tied with William McKinley's 68.66% of the vote in the state in the 1896 election as the highest percentage of the vote any Republican presidential candidate has ever received in New Hampshire, although McKinley did beat Reagan in terms of margin, winning by 42.78% versus Reagan's 37.71%. As of 2024, this remains the last time that an incumbent Republican president has carried New Hampshire. This would be the only election between 1952 and 2024 in which New Hampshire had lower turnout than the national average. Reagan's winning margin of over 146,000 votes is the largest in history for a presidential candidate in New Hampshire.

== Results ==
1984 United States presidential election in New Hampshire
Party	Candidate	Votes	Percentage	Electoral votes
Republican	Ronald Reagan (incumbent)	267,051	68.66%	4
Democratic	Walter Mondale	120,395	30.95%	0
Libertarian	David Bergland	735	0.19%	0
Independent	Lyndon LaRouche	468	0.12%	0
NH Alliance	Dennis L. Serrette	305	0.08%	0
Totals		388,954	100.00%	4
Voter Turnout (Voting age/Registered)				53%/72%

=== Results by county ===
County	Ronald Reagan Republican		Walter Mondale Democratic		David Bergland Libertarian		Lyndon Larouche Independent		Dennis Serrette New Hampshire Alliance		Margin		Total votes cast
County	#	%	#	%	#	%	#	%	#	%	#	%	Total votes cast
Belknap	14,200	74.63%	4,743	24.93%	40	0.21%	29	0.15%	15	0.08%	9,457	49.70%	19,027
Carroll	11,891	75.43%	3,806	24.14%	32	0.20%	25	0.16%	10	0.06%	8,085	51.29%	15,764
Cheshire	15,851	63.55%	8,990	36.05%	55	0.22%	30	0.12%	15	0.06%	6,861	27.50%	24,941
Coös	10,013	71.23%	4,004	28.48%	20	0.14%	19	0.14%	1	0.01%	6,009	42.75%	14,057
Grafton	18,451	67.59%	8,757	32.08%	63	0.23%	20	0.07%	9	0.03%	9,694	35.51%	27,300
Hillsborough	81,462	70.68%	33,314	28.91%	208	0.18%	118	0.10%	149	0.13%	48,148	41.77%	115,251
Merrimack	27,925	67.16%	13,510	32.49%	73	0.18%	43	0.10%	28	0.07%	14,415	34.67%	41,579
Rockingham	57,586	69.01%	25,557	30.63%	140	0.17%	107	0.13%	50	0.06%	32,029	38.38%	83,440
Strafford	20,452	61.31%	12,752	38.23%	76	0.23%	54	0.16%	22	0.07%	7,700	23.08%	33,356
Sullivan	9,220	64.75%	4,962	34.85%	28	0.20%	23	0.16%	6	0.04%	4,258	29.90%	14,239
Totals	267,051	68.66%	120,395	30.95%	735	0.19%	468	0.12%	305	0.08%	146,656	37.71%	388,954

== See also ==
- Presidency of Ronald Reagan
- United States presidential elections in New Hampshire
