= 1920 United States presidential election in New Hampshire =

- November 2, 1920
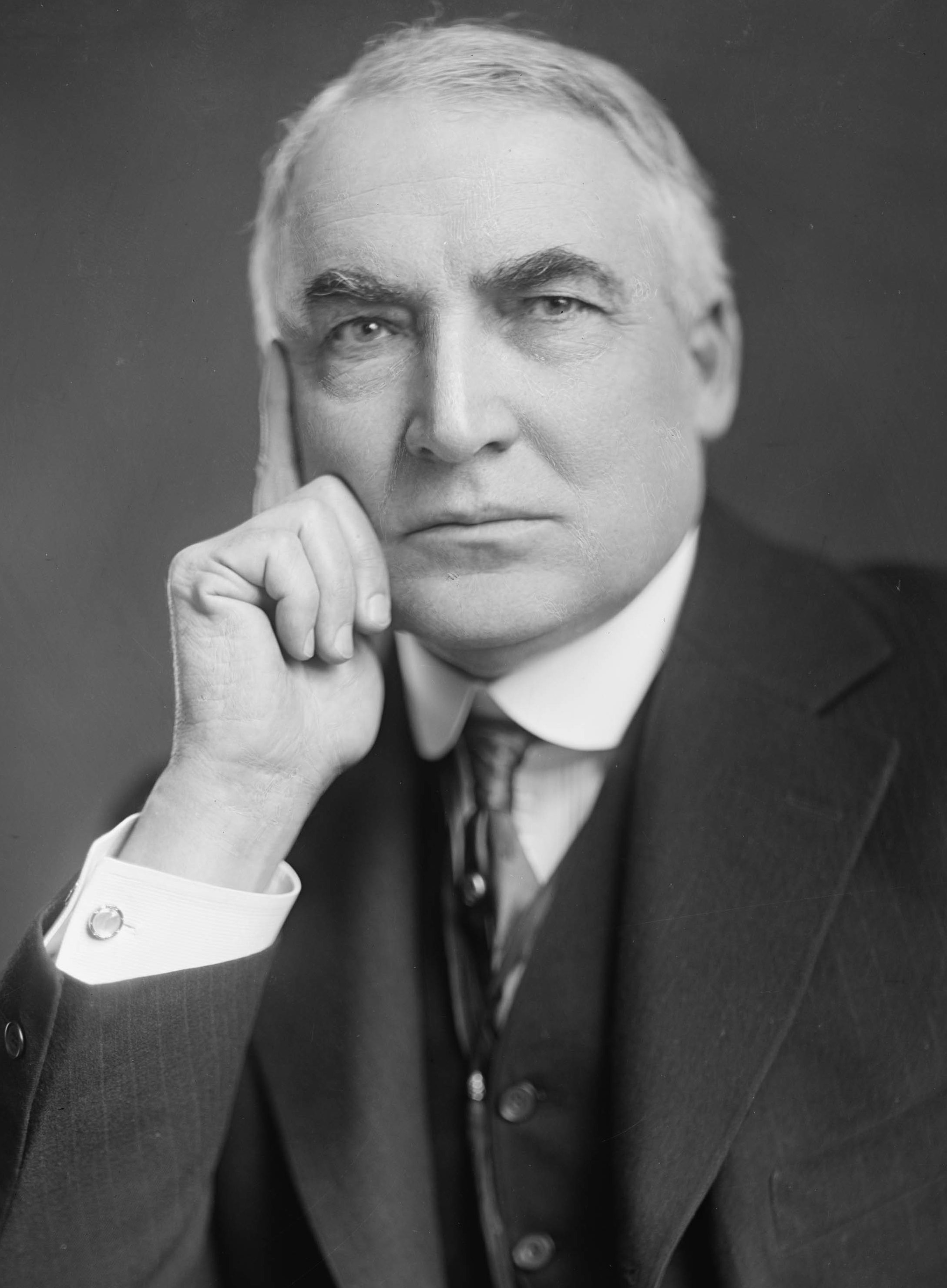

Nominee	Warren G. Harding	James M. Cox
Party	Republican	Democratic
Home state	Ohio	Ohio
Running mate	Calvin Coolidge	Franklin D. Roosevelt
Electoral vote	4	0
Popular vote	95,196	62,662
Percentage	59.84%	39.39%

Harding
40–50%
50–60%
60–70%
70–80%
80–90%
90–100%
Cox
50–60%
60–70%
President before election
Woodrow Wilson
Democratic
Elected President
Warren G. Harding
Republican

The 1920 United States presidential election in New Hampshire took place on November 2, 1920, as part of the 1920 United States presidential election which was held throughout all contemporary 48 states. Voters chose four representatives, or electors, to the Electoral College, who voted for president and vice president.

New Hampshire voted for Republican nominee, Senator Warren G. Harding of Ohio, over the Democratic nominee, Governor James M. Cox of Ohio. Harding ran with Governor Calvin Coolidge of Massachusetts, while Cox ran with Assistant Secretary of the Navy Franklin D. Roosevelt of New York.

Harding won New Hampshire by a margin of 20.45%. His victory in the New England states was helped by the local popularity of his running mate, Calvin Coolidge, a traditional New England Yankee born in the small-town of Plymouth Notch in neighboring Vermont, who had started his political career in neighboring Massachusetts as its governor. Despite this, New Hampshire would be Cox's second-strongest antebellum free state after Indiana by popular vote percentage and the third-strongest after Indiana and Cox's Ohio in terms of percentage margin.

New Hampshire voted 5.72% more Democratic than the nation at-large – which is the most Democratic relative to the nation that New Hampshire has ever voted since the Republican Party was founded. Although Cox carried no counties, Hillsborough and longtime national bellwether Coös would prove his strongest counties in New England.

== Results ==
1920 United States presidential election in New Hampshire
Party	Candidate	Running mate	Popular vote		Electoral vote	
Party	Candidate	Running mate	Count	%	Count	%
Republican	Warren Gamaliel Harding of Ohio	Calvin Coolidge of Massachusetts	95,196	59.84%	4	100.00%
Democratic	James Middleton Cox of Ohio	Franklin Delano Roosevelt of New York	62,662	39.39%	0	0.00%
Socialist	Eugene Victor Debs of Indiana	Seymour Stedman of Illinois	1,234	0.78%	0	0.00%
Total			159,092	100.00%	4	100.00%

=== Results by county ===
County	Warren Gamaliel Harding Republican		James Middleton Cox Democratic		Eugene Victor Debs Socialist		Margin		Total votes cast
County	#	%	#	%	#	%	#	%	Total votes cast
Belknap	5,628	61.74%	3,464	38.00%	23	0.25%	2,164	23.74%	9,115
Carroll	4,214	64.73%	2,279	35.01%	17	0.26%	1,935	29.72%	6,510
Cheshire	6,644	65.83%	3,374	33.43%	74	0.73%	3,270	32.40%	10,092
Coös	6,114	54.45%	4,985	44.40%	129	1.15%	1,129	10.06%	11,228
Grafton	9,650	61.10%	6,102	38.63%	42	0.27%	3,548	22.46%	15,794
Hillsborough	23,040	54.44%	18,736	44.27%	546	1.29%	4,304	10.17%	42,322
Merrimack	12,748	58.28%	8,976	41.04%	148	0.68%	3,772	17.25%	21,872
Rockingham	13,811	67.29%	6,582	32.07%	132	0.64%	7,229	35.22%	20,525
Strafford	8,700	60.37%	5,643	39.15%	69	0.48%	3,057	21.21%	14,412
Sullivan	4,647	64.35%	2,521	34.91%	54	0.75%	2,126	29.44%	7,222
Totals	95,196	59.84%	62,662	39.39%	1,234	0.78%	32,534	20.45%	159,092

== See also ==
- United States presidential elections in New Hampshire
