= 1884 United States presidential election in New Hampshire =

- November 4, 1884
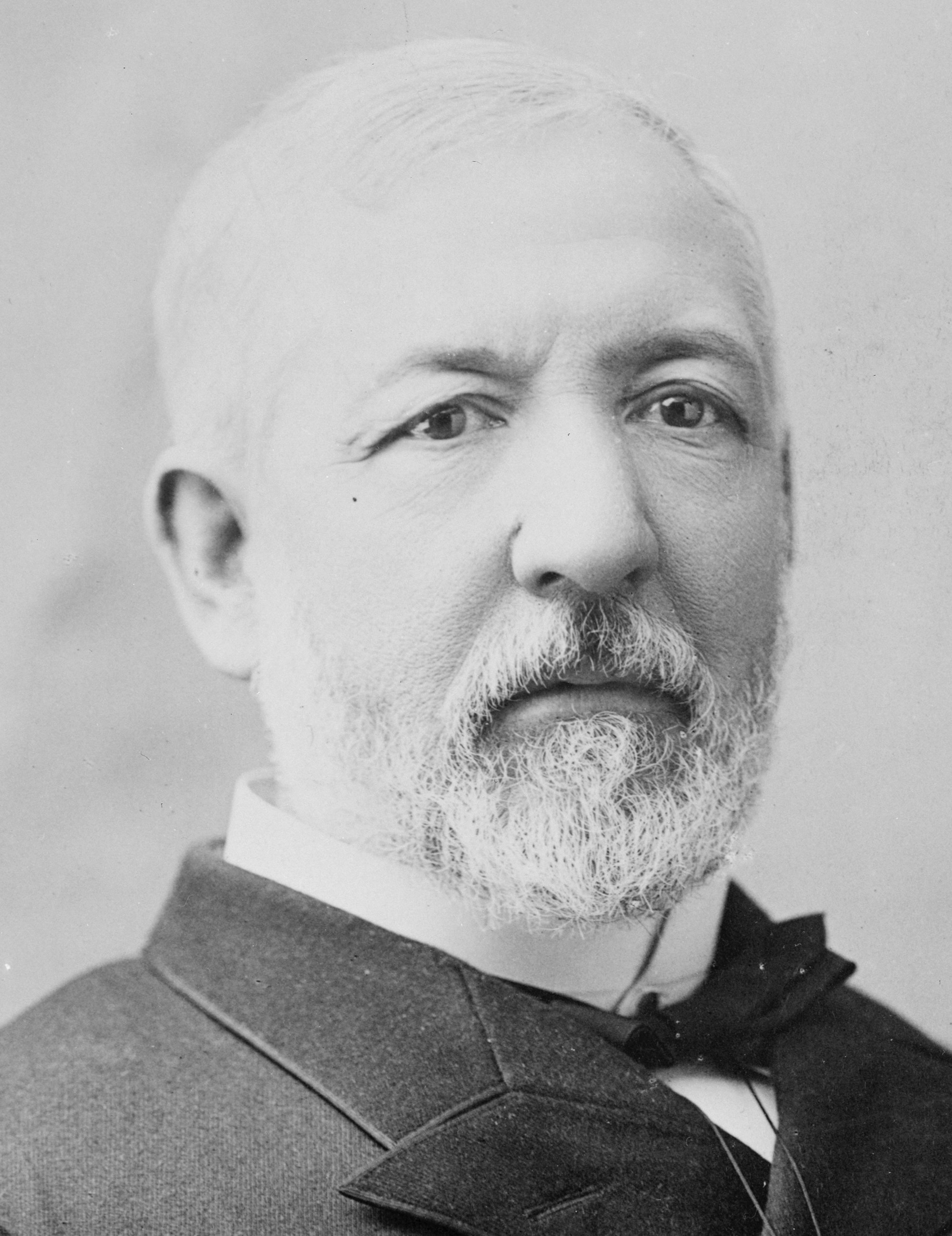

Nominee	James G. Blaine	Grover Cleveland
Party	Republican	Democratic
Home state	Maine	New York
Running mate	John A. Logan	Thomas A. Hendricks
Electoral vote	4	0
Popular vote	43,254	39,198
Percentage	51.14%	46.34%
County results
Blaine
50–60%
Cleveland
40–50%
50–60%
President before election
Chester A. Arthur
Republican
Elected President
Grover Cleveland
Democratic

The 1884 United States presidential election in New Hampshire took place on November 4, 1884, as part of the 1884 United States presidential election. Voters chose four representatives, or electors to the Electoral College, who voted for president and vice president.

New Hampshire voted for the Republican nominee, James G. Blaine, over the Democratic nominee, Grover Cleveland. Blaine won the state by a narrow margin of 4.80%. This would be the last occasion a Democratic presidential candidate won Belknap County until Woodrow Wilson won it in 1912.

== Results ==
1884 United States presidential election in New Hampshire
Party	Candidate	Running mate	Popular vote		Electoral vote	
Party	Candidate	Running mate	Count	%	Count	%
Republican	James Gillespie Blaine of Maine	John Alexander Logan of Illinois	43,254	51.14%	4	100.00%
Democratic	Grover Cleveland of New York	Thomas Andrews Hendricks of Indiana	39,198	46.34%	0	0.00%
Prohibition	John Pierce St. John of Kansas	William Daniel of Maryland	1,580	1.87%	0	0.00%
Greenback	Benjamin Franklin Butler of Massachusetts	Absolom Madden West of Mississippi	554	0.65%	0	0.00%
Total			84,586	100.00%	4	100.00%

=== Results by county ===
County	James Gillespie Blaine Republican		Stephen Grover Cleveland Democratic		Various candidates Other parties		Margin		Total votes cast
County	#	%	#	%	#	%	#	%	Total votes cast
Belknap	2,368	48.57%	2,381	48.84%	126	2.58%	-13	-0.27%	4,875
Carroll	2,286	46.95%	2,443	50.17%	140	2.88%	-157	-3.22%	4,869
Cheshire	3,888	54.34%	2,981	41.66%	286	4.00%	907	12.68%	7,155
Coös	1,987	44.44%	2,394	53.55%	90	2.01%	-407	-9.10%	4,471
Grafton	5,171	50.30%	4,917	47.83%	193	1.88%	254	2.47%	10,281
Hillsborough	8,540	53.31%	7,075	44.17%	404	2.52%	1,465	9.15%	16,019
Merrimack	6,005	50.59%	5,513	46.45%	351	2.96%	492	4.15%	11,869
Rockingham	6,162	50.63%	5,682	46.69%	326	2.68%	480	3.94%	12,170
Strafford	4,370	52.74%	3,781	45.63%	135	1.63%	589	7.11%	8,286
Sullivan	2,477	53.95%	2,031	44.24%	83	1.81%	446	9.71%	4,591
Totals	43,254	51.14%	39,198	46.34%	2,134	2.52%	4,056	4.80%	84,586

== See also ==
- United States presidential elections in New Hampshire
