= Robert W. Wiley =

American politician

- In office 2002–2006

Personal details
- Born: 1963 (age 62–63)
- Party: Republican

Robert W. Wiley is a Republican United States politician from Rockingham County, New Hampshire .

Wiley served 2 terms (2002–2006) as a member of the New Hampshire House of Representatives, where he represented Derry.
