= 1936 United States presidential election in New Hampshire =

- November 3, 1936

Nominee	Franklin D. Roosevelt	Alf Landon
Party	Democratic	Republican
Home state	New York	Kansas
Running mate	John Nance Garner	Frank Knox
Electoral vote	4	0
Popular vote	108,460	104,642
Percentage	49.73%	47.98%

Roosevelt
40–50%
50–60%
60–70%
70–80%
80–90%
Landon
40–50%
50–60%
60–70%
70–80%
80–90%
90–100%
President before election
Franklin D. Roosevelt
Democratic
Elected President
Franklin D. Roosevelt
Democratic

The 1936 United States presidential election in New Hampshire was held on November 3, 1936, as part of the 1936 United States presidential election. The state voters chose four electors to the Electoral College, who voted for president and vice president.

New Hampshire voted for Democratic Party candidate and incumbent President Franklin D. Roosevelt, who won the state by a narrow margin of 1.75%, after early reports showed Landon carrying the state. With Roosevelt's victory in New Hampshire, he became the first Democratic candidate since President Woodrow Wilson in 1916 to carry the state. The state was also the closest in the election, and the only one to have a margin of less than 5 points.

While Landon lost the state, the 47.98% of the popular vote made New Hampshire his third strongest state after neighboring Vermont and Maine, which were the only two states Landon won in the election.

== Results ==
1936 United States presidential election in New Hampshire
Party	Candidate	Running mate	Popular vote		Electoral vote	
Party	Candidate	Running mate	Count	%	Count	%
Democratic	Franklin Delano Roosevelt of New York	John Nance Garner of Texas	108,460	49.73%	4	100.00%
Republican	Alf Landon of Kansas	Frank Knox of Illinois	104,642	47.98%	0	0.00%
Union	William Lemke of North Dakota	Thomas C. O'Brien of Massachusetts	4,819	2.21%	0	0.00%
Communist	Earl Russell Browder of Kansas	James W. Ford of New York	193	0.09%	0	0.00%
Total			218,114	100.00%	4	100.00%

=== Results by county ===
County	Franklin Delano Roosevelt Democratic		Alfred Mossman Landon Republican		William Frederick Lemke Union		Earl Russell Browder Communist		Margin		Total votes cast
County	#	%	#	%	#	%	#	%	#	%	Total votes cast
Belknap	5,150	44.70%	6,219	53.98%	145	1.26%	8	0.07%	-1,069	-9.28%	11,522
Carroll	2,769	33.26%	5,521	66.32%	32	0.38%	3	0.04%	-2,752	-33.06%	8,325
Cheshire	6,322	43.38%	8,052	55.25%	183	1.26%	17	0.12%	-1,730	-11.87%	14,574
Coös	8,737	55.67%	6,737	42.93%	196	1.25%	24	0.15%	2,000	12.74%	15,694
Grafton	8,520	42.57%	11,336	56.63%	142	0.71%	18	0.09%	-2,816	-14.06%	20,016
Hillsborough	34,992	57.20%	23,293	38.07%	2,841	4.64%	54	0.09%	11,699	19.13%	61,180
Merrimack	13,645	48.18%	14,456	51.05%	194	0.69%	24	0.08%	-811	-2.87%	28,319
Rockingham	12,207	43.21%	15,466	54.75%	559	1.98%	17	0.06%	-3,259	-11.54%	28,249
Strafford	11,005	55.87%	8,215	41.71%	464	2.36%	13	0.07%	2,790	14.16%	19,697
Sullivan	5,113	48.52%	5,347	50.74%	63	0.60%	15	0.14%	-234	-2.22%	10,538
Totals	108,460	49.73%	104,642	47.98%	4,819	2.21%	193	0.09%	3,818	1.75%	218,114

== See also ==
- United States presidential elections in New Hampshire
