= 1880 United States presidential election in New Hampshire =

- November 2, 1880
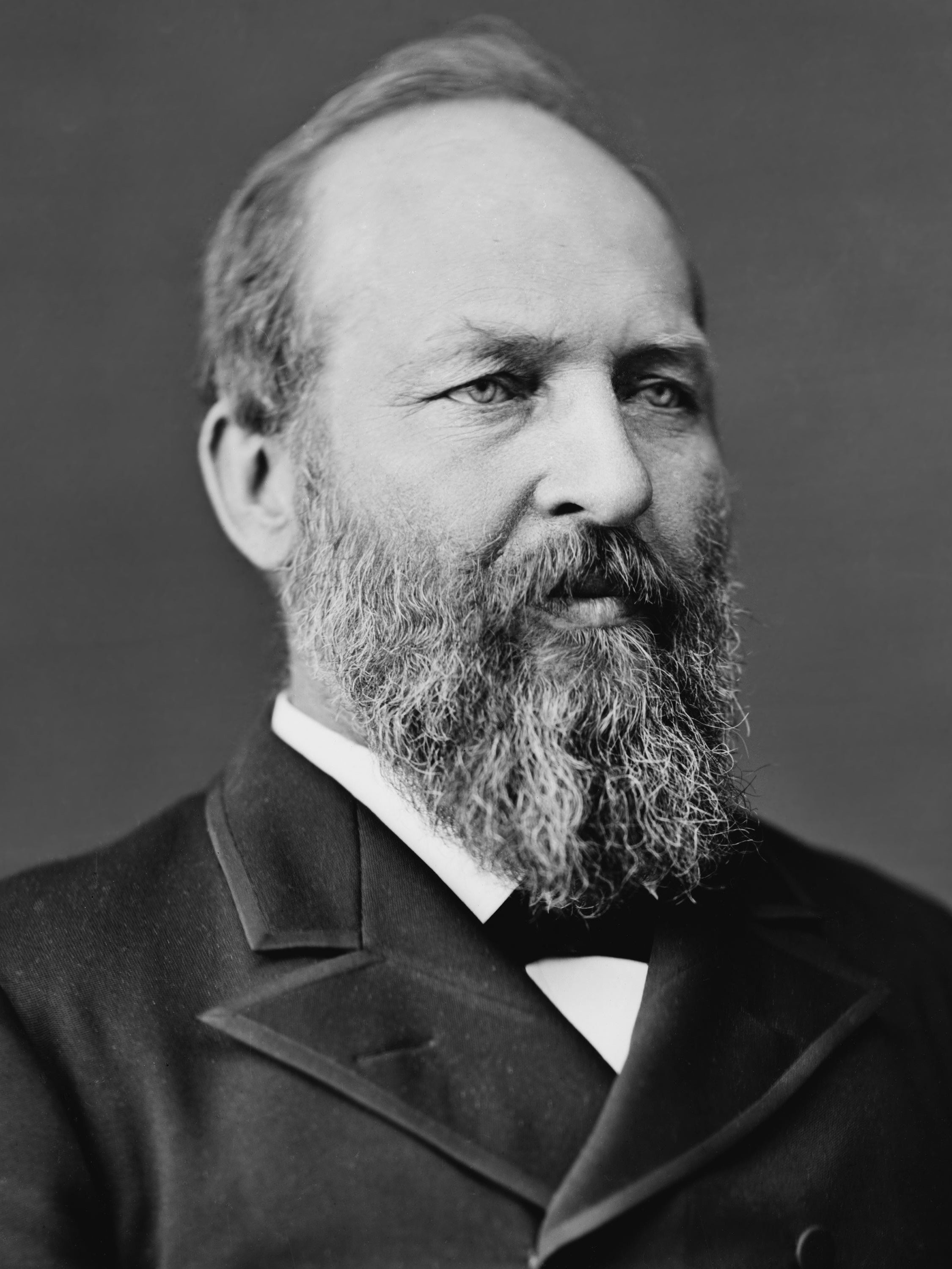

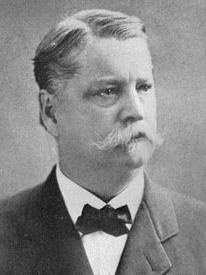
Nominee	James A. Garfield	Winfield Scott Hancock
Party	Republican	Democratic
Home state	Ohio	Pennsylvania
Running mate	Chester A. Arthur	William Hayden English
Electoral vote	5	0
Popular vote	44,856	40,797
Percentage	51.94%	48.15%
County results
Garfield
40–50%
50–60%
Hancock
50–60%
President before election
Rutherford B. Hayes
Republican
Elected President
James A. Garfield
Republican

The 1880 United States presidential election in New Hampshire took place on November 2, 1880, as part of the 1880 United States presidential election. Voters chose five representatives, or electors to the Electoral College, who voted for president and vice president.

New Hampshire voted for the Republican nominee, James A. Garfield, over the Democratic nominee, Winfield Scott Hancock. Garfield won the state by a narrow margin of 4.70%. This would be the last occasion any Democratic presidential candidate won Grafton County until Woodrow Wilson in 1912, and the last occasion a Democrat won an absolute majority of the presidential vote in Belknap County until Lyndon B. Johnson did so in his 1964 landslide.

== Results ==
1880 United States presidential election in New Hampshire
Party	Candidate	Running mate	Popular vote		Electoral vote	
Party	Candidate	Running mate	Count	%	Count	%
Republican	James Abram Garfield of Ohio	Chester Alan Arthur of New York	44,856	51.94%	5	100.00%
Democratic	Winfield Scott Hancock of Pennsylvania	William Hayden English of Indiana	40,797	47.24%	0	0.00%
Greenback	James Baird Weaver of Iowa	Barzillai Jefferson Chambers of Texas	528	0.61%	0	0.00%
Prohibition	Neal Dow of Maine	Henry Adams Thompson of Ohio	180	0.21%	0	0.00%
Total			86,361	100.00%	5	100.00%

=== Results by county ===
County	James Abram Garfield Republican		Winfield Scott Hancock Democratic		James Baird Weaver Greenback		Neal Dow Prohibition		Margin		Total votes cast
County	#	%	#	%	#	%	#	%	#	%	Total votes cast
Belknap	2,350	47.81%	2,483	50.52%	55	1.12%	27	0.55%	-133	-2.71%	4,915
Carroll	2,426	47.46%	2,639	51.62%	24	0.47%	23	0.45%	-213	-4.17%	5,112
Cheshire	4,380	58.83%	2,979	40.01%	67	0.90%	19	0.26%	1,401	18.82%	7,445
Coös	1,829	42.89%	2,387	55.98%	44	1.03%	4	0.09%	-558	-13.09%	4,264
Grafton	4,964	47.71%	5,300	50.94%	132	1.27%	8	0.08%	-336	-3.23%	10,404
Hillsborough	8,689	55.11%	6,999	44.39%	56	0.36%	24	0.15%	1,690	10.72%	15,768
Merrimack	5,935	49.95%	5,922	49.84%	9	0.08%	17	0.14%	13	0.11%	11,883
Rockingham	6,960	53.25%	5,989	45.82%	91	0.70%	30	0.23%	971	7.43%	13,070
Strafford	4,634	53.78%	3,922	45.51%	38	0.44%	23	0.27%	712	8.26%	8,617
Sullivan	2,729	55.46%	2,175	44.20%	12	0.24%	5	0.10%	554	11.26%	4,921
Totals	44,896	51.96%	40,795	47.22%	528	0.61%	180	0.21%	4,101	4.75%	86,399

==== Counties that flipped from Democratic to Republican ====
- Merrimack

== See also ==
- United States presidential elections in New Hampshire
