= 1876 United States presidential election in New Hampshire =

- November 7, 1876
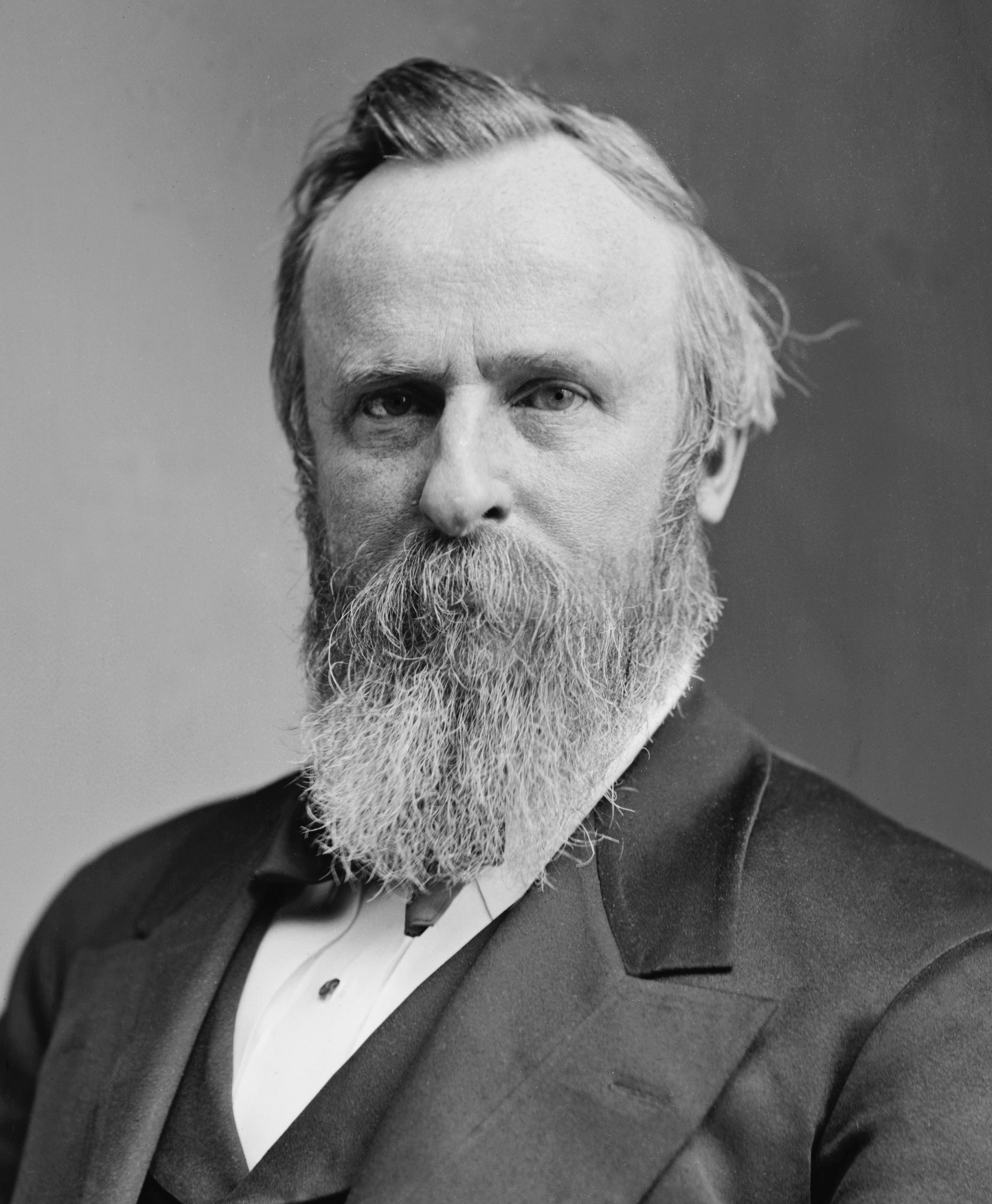

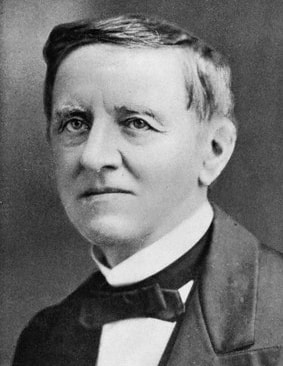
Nominee	Rutherford B. Hayes	Samuel J. Tilden
Party	Republican	Democratic
Home state	Ohio	New York
Running mate	William A. Wheeler	Thomas A. Hendricks
Electoral vote	5	0
Popular vote	41,540	38,510
Percentage	51.83%	48.05%
County results
Hayes
50–60%
Tilden
50–60%
President before election
Ulysses S. Grant
Republican
Elected President
Rutherford B. Hayes
Republican

The 1876 United States presidential election in New Hampshire took place on November 7, 1876, as part of the 1876 United States presidential election. Voters chose five representatives, or electors to the Electoral College, who voted for president and vice president.

New Hampshire voted for the Republican nominee, Rutherford B. Hayes, over the Democratic nominee, Samuel J. Tilden. Hayes won the state by a narrow margin of 3.78%.

== Results ==
1876 United States presidential election in New Hampshire
Party	Candidate	Running mate	Popular vote		Electoral vote	
Party	Candidate	Running mate	Count	%	Count	%
Republican	Rutherford B. Hayes of Ohio	William A. Wheeler of New York	41,540	51.83%	5	100.00%
Democratic	Samuel J. Tilden of New York	Thomas A. Hendricks of Indiana	38,510	48.05%	0	0.00%
N/A	Others	Others	91	0.11%	0	0.00%
Total			80,141	100.00%	5	100.00%

== See also ==
- United States presidential elections in New Hampshire
