= 1916 United States presidential election in New Hampshire =

- November 7, 1916

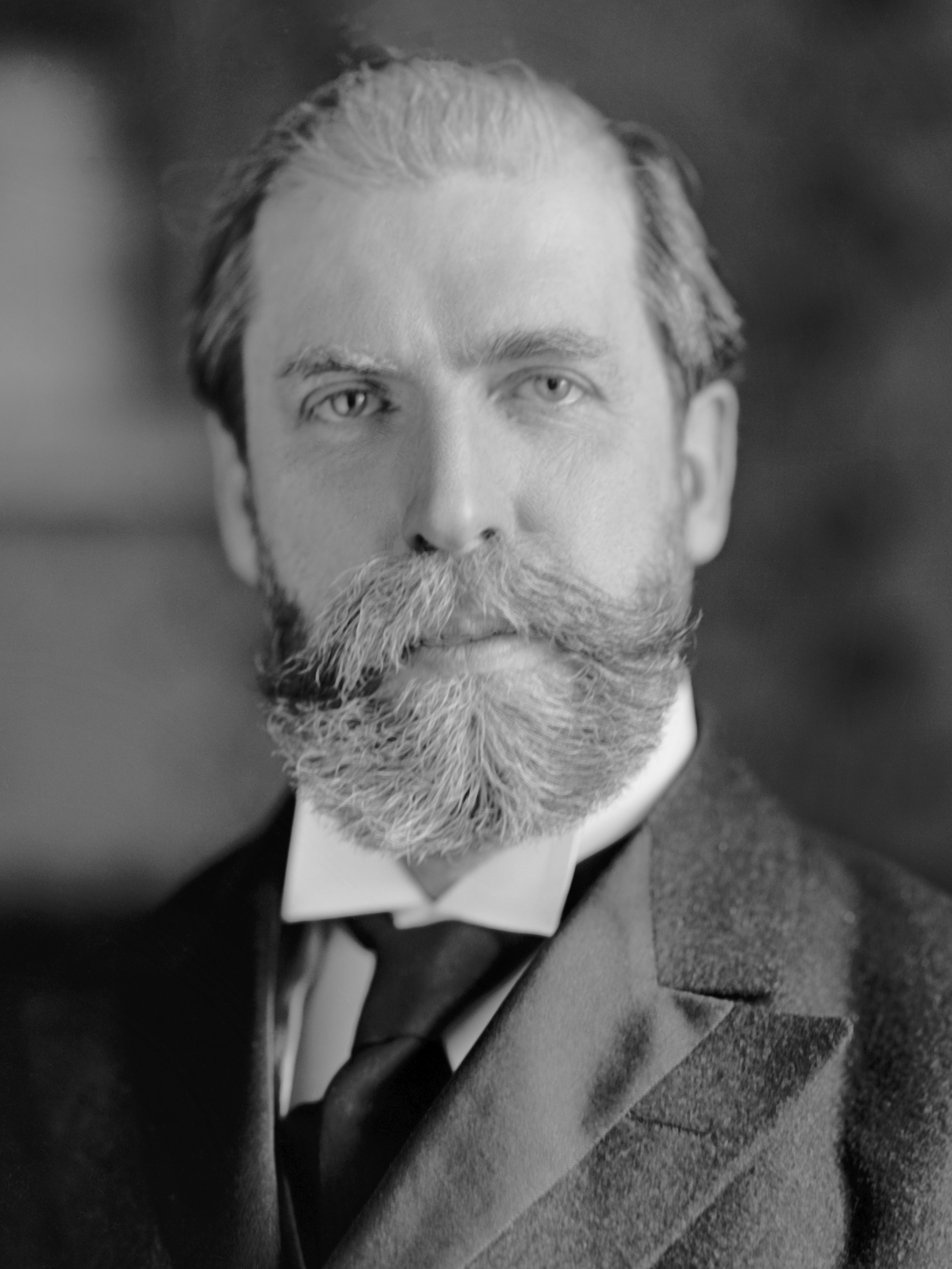
Nominee	Woodrow Wilson	Charles Evans Hughes
Party	Democratic	Republican
Home state	New Jersey	New York
Running mate	Thomas R. Marshall	Charles W. Fairbanks
Electoral vote	4	0
Popular vote	43,781	43,725
Percentage	49.12%	49.06%

Wilson
40–50%
50–60%
60–70%
70–80%
90–100%
Hughes
40–50%
50–60%
60–70%
70–80%
80–90%
90–100%
Tie
30–40%
40–50%
50%
President before election
Woodrow Wilson
Democratic
Elected President
Woodrow Wilson
Democratic

The 1916 United States presidential election in New Hampshire took place on November 7, 1916, as part of the 1916 United States presidential election which was held throughout all contemporary 48 states. Voters chose four representatives, or electors to the Electoral College, who voted for president and vice president.

New Hampshire was won by the Democratic nominees, incumbent Democratic President Woodrow Wilson and Vice President Thomas R. Marshall. They defeated Republican nominee, U.S. Supreme Court Justice Charles Evans Hughes of New York, and his running mate Senator Charles W. Fairbanks of Indiana.

Wilson won New Hampshire by a very narrow margin of just 0.06283% (one vote in 1,592) and 56 popular votes. In terms of popular vote margin, this is the third-closest state presidential election race on record, behind two in Maryland from 1832 and 1904. In terms of percentage, it stands as the ninth-closest behind the two Maryland elections above, two from California in 1892 and 1912, Kentucky in 1896, Hawaii’s inaugural 1960 election, and the 2000 Florida and New Mexico elections. This is the only presidential election in which New Hampshire voted Democratic while a number of modern-day Democratic-leaning states voted Republican. These states include the fellow New England states of Massachusetts, Rhode Island, and Connecticut, as well as New York, New Jersey, Delaware, Minnesota, Illinois, and Oregon. It was also the only election in which New Hampshire voted Democratic while Pennsylvania voted Republican until 2016.

The giant Rexall drugstore chain made an early opinion poll that predicted Wilson’s narrow victory in New Hampshire and in California almost perfectly, leading to a reputation for accuracy that was to be lost twenty years subsequently.

This was the first time since 1852 that Sullivan County voted for a Democratic presidential candidate.

== Results ==
1916 United States presidential election in New Hampshire
Party	Candidate	Running mate	Popular vote		Electoral vote	
Party	Candidate	Running mate	Count	%	Count	%
Democratic	Woodrow Wilson of New Jersey	Thomas Riley Marshall of Indiana	43,781	49.12%	4	100.00%
Republican	Charles Evans Hughes of New York	Charles Warren Fairbanks of Indiana	43,725	49.06%	0	0.00%
Socialist	Allan Louis Benson of New York	George Ross Kirkpatrick of New Jersey	1,318	1.48%	0	0.00%
Prohibition	James Franklin Hanly of Indiana	Ira Landrith of Tennessee	303	0.34%	0	0.00%
Total			89,127	100.00%	4	100.00%

=== Results by county ===
County	Thomas Woodrow Wilson Democratic		Charles Evans Hughes Republican		Allan Louis Benson Socialist		James Franklin Hanly Prohibition		Margin		Total votes cast
County	#	%	#	%	#	%	#	%	#	%	Total votes cast
Belknap	2,310	46.19%	2,579	51.57%	62	1.24%	50	1.00%	-269	-5.38%	5,001
Carroll	2,003	46.65%	2,259	52.61%	22	0.51%	10	0.23%	-256	-5.96%	4,294
Cheshire	2,779	44.51%	3,337	53.44%	121	1.94%	7	0.11%	-558	-8.93%	6,244
Coös	3,247	51.99%	2,762	44.22%	210	3.36%	27	0.43%	485	7.77%	6,246
Grafton	4,644	48.80%	4,795	50.38%	49	0.51%	29	0.30%	-151	-1.58%	9,517
Hillsborough	10,939	51.05%	9,927	46.33%	502	2.34%	60	0.28%	1,012	4.72%	21,428
Merrimack	5,967	49.14%	5,970	49.16%	160	1.32%	47	0.39%	-3	-0.02%	12,144
Rockingham	5,637	48.32%	5,866	50.29%	114	0.98%	48	0.41%	-229	-1.97%	11,665
Strafford	4,040	49.62%	4,037	49.58%	49	0.60%	16	0.20%	3	0.04%	8,142
Sullivan	2,215	49.82%	2,193	49.33%	29	0.65%	9	0.20%	22	0.49%	4,446
Totals	43,781	49.12%	43,725	49.06%	1,621	1.82%	303	0.34%	56	0.06%	89,127

== See also ==
- United States presidential elections in New Hampshire
