= Elections in New Hampshire =

Elections in the U.S. state of New Hampshire are held at national, state and local (county and municipal) level. The state holds the first presidential primary in the national cycle. Elections for a range of state positions coincide with biennial elections for the House of Representatives.

In a 2020 study, New Hampshire was ranked as the 6th hardest state for citizens to vote in.

== Elections for state offices ==
Gubernatorial election results
Year	Democratic	Republican
1950	43.0% 82,258	57.0% 108,907
1952	36.9% 97,924	63.2% 167,791
1954	44.9% 87,344	55.1% 107,287
1956	45.3% 117,117	54.7% 141,578
1958	48.4% 99,955	51.7% 106,790
1960	44.5% 129,404	55.5% 161,123
1962	58.9% 135,481	41.1% 94,567
1964	66.8% 190,863	33.2% 94,824
1966	53.9% 125,882	45.9% 107,259
1968	47.4% 135,378	52.5% 149,902
1970	44.1% 98,098	46.0% 102,298
1972	39.0% 126,107	41.4% 133,702
1974	48.8% 110,591	51.2% 115,933
1976	42.3% 145,015	57.7% 197,589
1978	49.4% 133,133	45.4% 122,464
1980	59.0% 226,436	40.7% 156,178
1982	46.8% 132,317	51.5% 145,389
1984	33.1% 127,156	66.9% 256,574
1986	46.3% 116,142	53.7% 134,824
1988	39.1% 172,543	60.5% 267,064
1990	34.7% 101,923	60.5% 177,773
1992	40.0% 206,232	56.0% 289,170
1994	25.6% 79,686	70.0% 218,134
1996	57.2% 284,175	39.5% 196,321
1998	66.1% 210,769	30.9% 98,473
2000	48.7% 275,038	43.8% 246,952
2002	38.2% 169,277	58.6% 259,663
2004	51.0% 340,299	48.9% 325,981
2006	74.0% 298,761	25.8% 104,288
2008	70.2% 479,042	27.6% 188,555
2010	52.6% 240,346	45.0% 205,616
2012	54.6% 378,934	42.5% 295,026
2014	52.4% 254,666	47.4% 230,610
2016	46.6% 337,589	48.8% 354,040
2018	45.7% 262,359	52.8% 302,764
2020	33.4% 264,639	65.1% 516,609
2022	41.5% 256,774	57.0% 352,982
2024	44.3% 360,149	53.6% 436,122

The state of New Hampshire holds its state general elections on the first Tuesday after the first Monday in November (better known as Election Day) in even-numbered years. As a result of this, general elections in New Hampshire systematically coincide with the biennial elections for the United States House of Representatives.

During general elections in New Hampshire, elections are held for the positions of Governor, Executive Councilor, state Senator, state Representative, Sheriff, County Attorney, County Treasurer, Register of Deeds, and Register of Probate. Officials elected to all nine of these offices are elected for a term of two years.

Election of County Commissioners also occurs during the state's general elections, but rules for these elections vary by county. In Strafford County, for example, three County Commissioners are elected to two-year terms at every general election. In Carroll County, by contrast, three County Commissioners are elected to rotating four-year terms.

New Hampshire's Governor is elected at large; Executive Councilors, state Senators, and state Representatives are elected by district; Sheriff, County Attorney, County Treasurer, Register of Deeds, and Register of Probate are elected by county; and County Commissioners are elected, again, by rules that vary from county to county.

New Hampshire currently has 400 seats in its House of Representatives, 24 seats in its Senate, and five seats on its Executive Council.

== National elections ==
New Hampshire is well known in national politics for holding the first primary in the quadrennial U.S. presidential election cycle. This New Hampshire primary is actually mandated by state law. New Hampshire RSA 653:9 requires that the state's presidential primary elections be scheduled on the earlier of:

1. the second Tuesday in March, or
2. no less than seven days prior to the holding of a "similar election" in any other state

== History ==
United States presidential election results for New Hampshire
Year	Republican / Whig		Democratic		Third party(ies)	
Year	No.	%	No.	%	No.	%
1836	6,228	24.99%	18,697	75.01%	0	0.00%
1840	26,310	43.88%	32,774	54.66%	872	1.45%
1844	17,866	36.32%	27,160	55.22%	4,161	8.46%
1848	14,781	29.50%	27,763	55.41%	7,560	15.09%
1852	15,486	30.64%	28,503	56.40%	6,546	12.95%
1856	37,473	53.71%	31,891	45.71%	410	0.59%
1860	37,519	56.90%	25,887	39.26%	2,537	3.85%
1864	36,596	52.56%	33,034	47.44%	0	0.00%
1868	37,718	55.22%	30,575	44.76%	11	0.02%
1872	37,168	53.94%	31,425	45.61%	313	0.45%
1876	41,540	51.83%	38,510	48.05%	91	0.11%
1880	44,856	51.94%	40,797	47.24%	708	0.82%
1884	43,254	51.14%	39,198	46.34%	2,134	2.52%
1888	45,728	50.34%	43,456	47.84%	1,651	1.82%
1892	45,658	51.11%	42,081	47.11%	1,590	1.78%
1896	57,444	68.66%	21,650	25.88%	4,576	5.47%
1900	54,799	59.33%	35,489	38.42%	2,076	2.25%
1904	54,163	60.07%	34,074	37.79%	1,924	2.13%
1908	53,149	59.32%	33,655	37.56%	2,796	3.12%
1912	32,927	37.43%	34,724	39.48%	20,310	23.09%
1916	43,725	49.06%	43,781	49.12%	1,621	1.82%
1920	95,196	59.84%	62,662	39.39%	1,234	0.78%
1924	98,575	59.83%	57,201	34.72%	8,993	5.46%
1928	115,404	58.65%	80,715	41.02%	638	0.32%
1932	103,629	50.42%	100,680	48.99%	1,211	0.59%
1936	104,642	47.98%	108,460	49.73%	5,012	2.30%
1940	110,127	46.78%	125,292	53.22%	0	0.00%
1944	109,916	47.87%	119,663	52.11%	48	0.02%
1948	121,299	52.41%	107,995	46.66%	2,146	0.93%
1952	166,287	60.92%	106,663	39.08%	0	0.00%
1956	176,519	66.11%	90,364	33.84%	111	0.04%
1960	157,989	53.42%	137,772	46.58%	0	0.00%
1964	104,029	36.11%	184,064	63.89%	0	0.00%
1968	154,903	52.10%	130,589	43.93%	11,807	3.97%
1972	213,724	63.98%	116,435	34.85%	3,900	1.17%
1976	185,935	54.75%	147,635	43.47%	6,048	1.78%
1980	221,705	57.74%	108,864	28.35%	53,430	13.91%
1984	267,051	68.66%	120,395	30.95%	1,508	0.39%
1988	281,537	62.49%	163,696	36.33%	5,292	1.17%
1992	202,484	37.64%	209,040	38.86%	126,421	23.50%
1996	196,532	39.37%	246,214	49.32%	56,429	11.30%
2000	273,559	48.07%	266,348	46.80%	29,174	5.13%
2004	331,237	48.87%	340,511	50.24%	5,990	0.88%
2008	316,534	44.52%	384,826	54.13%	9,610	1.35%
2012	329,918	46.40%	369,561	51.98%	11,493	1.62%
2016	345,790	46.46%	348,526	46.83%	49,980	6.72%
2020	365,660	45.36%	424,937	52.71%	15,608	1.94%
2024	395,523	47.87%	418,488	50.65%	12,246	1.48%

New Hampshire voters selected Republicans for office during the 19th and 20th centuries until 1992. Since then, voters have chosen Democrats for U.S. President all but once, while voting Democratic for most state offices in 2006 and 2008 and Republican for most state offices in 2010. On selected issues, political debate in New Hampshire centers on personal liberty. Historically, New Hampshire was a staunchly conservative state and regularly voted Republican. Some sources trace the founding of the Republican Party to the town of Exeter in 1853. Prior to 1992, New Hampshire had only strayed from the Republican Party for three presidential candidates—Woodrow Wilson, Franklin D. Roosevelt, and Lyndon B. Johnson. The state voted for Presidents Richard Nixon and Ronald Reagan twice by overwhelming majorities.

Beginning in 1992, New Hampshire became a swing state in both national and local elections. The state supported Democrats Bill Clinton in 1992 and 1996, John Kerry in 2004, and Barack Obama in 2008 and 2012. It was the only U.S. state to support George W. Bush in the 2000 election and go Democratic in the 2004 election. The state has elected three Democrats to the Governorship during this period.

The voters selected Democrats in New Hampshire as they did nationally in 2006 and 2008. In 2006, Democrats won both congressional seats (electing Carol Shea-Porter in the 1st district and Paul Hodes in the 2nd district), re-elected Governor John Lynch, and gained a majority on the Executive Council and in both houses of the legislature for the first time since 1911. Democrats had not held both the legislature and the governorship since 1874. Neither U.S. Senate seat was up for a vote in 2006. In 2008, Democrats retained their majorities, governorship, and congressional seats; and former governor Jeanne Shaheen defeated incumbent Republican John E. Sununu for the U.S. Senate in a rematch of the 2002 contest. Barack Obama won the simultaneous presidential election and carried every New Hampshire county for the Democrats for the first time since 1852. It had been thought that Democrats moving in from Massachusetts were responsible for the shift. A 2006 University of New Hampshire survey found that those immigrants were mostly Republican. Their moving had helped the border towns to remain Republican, while other areas had become increasingly Democratic. The study indicated that immigrants from states other than Massachusetts tended to lean Democratic.

The 2008 elections resulted in women holding 13 of the 24 seats in the New Hampshire Senate, a first for any legislative body in the United States. At the end of the 2008 election cycle, voters registered Democratic outnumbered those registered Republican.

In the 2010 midterm elections, New Hampshire voted out both of its Democratic members in the House of Representatives in favor of Republicans. Republicans also won control of both chambers of the State House by veto-proof majorities, while Governor John Lynch won an unprecedented fourth term. Two years later, in the 2012 elections, New Hampshire voted out both of its Republican members in the House of Representatives in favor of Democrats. At the same time, voters returned Democrats to the majority in the State House of Representatives, while Republicans held on to a narrow 13–11 majority in the State Senate, despite losing the popular vote. Democrat Maggie Hassan won the 2012 gubernatorial election with a 12% margin of victory, with 54.6% of the vote in the gubernatorial election, becoming the first Democrat to succeed another Democrat as Governor of New Hampshire since 1854.

However, Republicans gained control of the State House in 2014, and in 2016 elections, Republican Executive Councilor Chris Sununu was elected as Governor, giving Republicans full control over state government. However, the state narrowly went to Democrat Hillary Clinton over Republican Donald Trump in that year's presidential election. Meanwhile, Democratic governor Maggie Hassan defeated incumbent Republican Kelly Ayotte to join Senator Jeanne Shaheen and Representatives Carol Shea-Porter and Ann McLane Kuster to make the entire congressional delegation represented by the Democratic party for the first time since 1854.

In the 2018 midterm elections, both chambers of the state legislature returned to Democratic control, while Sununu was reelected as governor, resulting in divided government. While New Hampshire Democrats retained their seats in the 2020 federal elections, Republicans regained the majority in the state's Senate, House of Representatives, and Executive Council. New Hampshire's incumbent Republican Gov. Chris Sununu also won the election to his third term in office against Democrat Dan Feltes. This election signaled Republican strength on a state level, flipping the Senate from a 14-10 Democratic majority to a 14-10 Republican majority. The house flipped to the GOP with 213 Republicans and 187 Democrats.

== See also ==
- 2026 New Hampshire elections
- Government of New Hampshire
- Elections in the United States
- New Hampshire primary
- New Hampshire primary, 2008
- Political party strength in New Hampshire
- United States presidential elections in New Hampshire
