= 2004 United States presidential election in New Hampshire =

- November 2, 2004

Nominee	John Kerry	George W. Bush
Party	Democratic	Republican
Home state	Massachusetts	Texas
Running mate	John Edwards	Dick Cheney
Electoral vote	4	0
Popular vote	340,511	331,237
Percentage	50.24%	48.87%

Kerry
40–50%
50–60%
60–70%
70–80%
90–100%
Bush
40–50%
50–60%
60–70%
70–80%
80–90%
No data
President before election
George W. Bush
Republican
Elected President
George W. Bush
Republican

The 2004 United States presidential election in New Hampshire took place on November 2, 2004, and was part of the 2004 United States presidential election. Voters chose four representatives, or electors to the Electoral College, who voted for president and vice president.

New Hampshire was won by Democratic nominee John Kerry by a 1.4% margin of victory. Prior to the election, most news organizations considered it as a swing state. Traditionally a more Republican leaning state of the heavily Democratic New England region, it was the only state in the Northeast to vote Republican in 2000. The state is considered to be more fiscally conservative than its neighbors in New England. However, like the rest of New England, it is considerably more liberal on social issues, which benefits Democratic candidates. New Hampshire was the only state that George W. Bush won in 2000 but lost in 2004, making it the only state in the union to vote for the loser of the national popular vote in both of those elections.

Bush became the first ever Republican incumbent to win New Hampshire only once and then win re-election without carrying the state, and also became the first Republican to ever win a presidential election without it. He was also the second consecutive Republican president (after his father) to lose New Hampshire in his second election after winning it in his first. This was also the first time since 1848 that a losing Democrat would carry New Hampshire, and the first time since 1976 that the state would back the losing candidate in a presidential election. This also marked the first of only three times overall (along with 2016 and 2024) in which any Republican won the White House without carrying New Hampshire. It is also the first time that a Republican has won the popular vote without carrying the state, with the second time being in 2024. And the only one to do so with a majority of the popular vote.

To date, this is the last election where the town of Mason voted for the Democratic candidate, and the last time Manchester—the largest city in the state—voted Republican.

== Primaries ==
=== Democratic primary ===
The 2004 New Hampshire Democratic Primary was held on January 27, 2004. Taking place 8 days after the Iowa caucuses, it marked the second contest to take place during the Democratic party's 2004 primary season, as well as the first actual primary to take place.

John Kerry polled consistently ahead in the primary polls, with Howard Dean, coming in at 2nd place. On election day John Kerry won a majority of the state's 27 delegates, winning 13, followed by Dean with 9, and 5 going unpledged.

2004 New Hampshire Democratic presidential primary
Candidate	Votes	%	Delegates
John Kerry	84,377	38.35%	13
Howard Dean	57,761	26.28%	9
Wesley Clark	27,314	12.43%	
John Edwards	26,487	12.05%	
Joe Lieberman	18,911	8.60%	
Dennis Kucinich	3,114	1.42%	
Other write-ins	1,823	0.83%	
Total	219,787	100%	27

== Campaign ==
=== Predictions ===
There were 12 news organizations who made state-by-state predictions of the election. Here are their last predictions before election day.

Source	Ranking
D.C. Political Report	Lean D (flip)
Cook Political Report	Tossup
Research 2000	Tossup
Zogby International	Likely D (flip)
Washington Post	Tossup
Washington Dispatch	Likely D (flip)
Washington Times	Tossup
The New York Times	Tossup
CNN	Likely D (flip)
Newsweek	Tossup
Associated Press	Tossup
Rasmussen Reports	Tossup

=== Polling ===
Pre-election polling was back and forth, with no clear indication who would end up winning the state. The final 3 polls averaged Kerry leading 48% to 47%, with the undecided voters, making up just 3%, deciding the election.

=== Fundraising ===
Bush raised $598,474. Kerry raised $766,720.

=== Advertising and visits ===
Bush visited the state six times, while Kerry visited the state four times. Each campaign spent between $100,000 and $300,000 each week.

== Analysis ==
New Hampshire, historically considered to be a more conservative state compared to the rest of New England, had by the early 2000s become a swing state in presidential elections, having voted for Democrat Bill Clinton twice in the 1990s but narrowly choosing Republican George W. Bush in 2000. However the state began heavily trending Democratic after 2000. Bush's approval ratings were consistently below 50% in 2004. Also, polling in the state consistently showed Kerry leading, and with between 47% and 50% of the vote.

On election day, Kerry won with just over 50% of the vote, with a small margin of victory, as expected from the polls. Major factors include Bush's lower approval ratings and just 1% who voted for third-party candidates, unlike 2000 when over 4% of the people voted for an independent. Kerry won 6 of the 10 counties. Most of the counties were won and lost by small margins. Kerry's key to victory was winning Cheshire County with over 59%. Bush's best performance was in Belknap County, which he won with over 55% and carrying every single town. Bush won New Hampshire's 1st congressional district, and Kerry won New Hampshire's 2nd congressional district. This was also the first presidential election since 1968 when Coos County would back the losing candidate (thus making Bush the first Republican since 1968 to win the White House without carrying this county), and only the second time since 1892 when that would occur overall. This would later be repeated when Donald Trump won the county over Joe Biden in 2020 despite losing the presidential election that year. Bush became the first ever Republican to win the White House without carrying Sullivan County.

Kerry was the first Democrat to win a majority in the state since 1964, as both of Bill Clinton's wins came as pluralities due to the large third party vote cast for Ross Perot.

== Results ==
2004 United States presidential election in New Hampshire
Party	Candidate	Votes	Percentage	Electoral votes
Democratic	John Kerry; John Edwards	340,511	50.24%	4
Republican	George W. Bush; Dick Cheney	331,237	48.87%	0
Independent	Ralph Nader; Peter Camejo	4,479	0.66%	0
Write Ins		978	0.14%	0
Libertarian (Write-in)	Michael Badnarik (Write-in)	372	0.05%	0
Constitution (Write-in)	Michael Peroutka (Write-in)	161	0.02%	0
Totals		677,738	100.00%	4
Voter turnout (Voting Age Population)				69.1%

=== By county ===
County	John Kerry Democratic		George W. Bush Republican		Various candidates Other parties		Margin		Total votes cast
County	#	%	#	%	#	%	#	%	Total votes cast
Belknap	14,080	43.59%	17,920	55.48%	298	0.92%	-3,840	-11.89%	32,298
Carroll	13,319	47.19%	14,614	51.78%	289	1.02%	-1,295	-4.59%	28,222
Cheshire	24,438	59.10%	16,463	39.82%	446	1.08%	7,975	19.28%	41,347
Coos	8,585	50.72%	8,143	48.11%	197	1.16%	442	2.61%	16,925
Grafton	26,180	55.74%	20,277	43.17%	514	1.09%	5,903	12.57%	46,971
Hillsborough	94,121	48.16%	99,724	51.03%	1,582	0.81%	-5,603	-2.87%	195,247
Merrimack	39,975	52.15%	36,060	47.05%	612	0.80%	3,915	5.10%	76,647
Rockingham	75,437	47.50%	82,069	51.68%	1,310	0.82%	-6,632	-4.18%	158,816
Strafford	32,942	55.57%	25,825	43.56%	514	0.87%	7,117	12.01%	59,281
Sullivan	11,434	52.44%	10,142	46.51%	228	1.04%	1,292	5.93%	21,804
Totals	340,511	50.24%	331,237	48.87%	5,990	0.89%	9,274	1.37%	677,738

==== Counties that flipped from Republican to Democratic ====
- Coös (largest municipality: Berlin)
- Sullivan (largest municipality: Claremont)

=== By congressional district ===
Bush and Kerry each won a congressional district. Kerry won a district held by a Republican.

District	Bush	Kerry	Representative
1st	51%	48%	Jeb Bradley
2nd	47%	52%	Charles Bass

== Electors ==
Technically the voters of NH cast their ballots for electors: representatives to the Electoral College. NH is allocated 4 electors because it has 2 congressional districts and 2 senators. All candidates who appear on the ballot or qualify to receive write-in votes must submit a list of 4 electors, who pledge to vote for their candidate and his or her running mate. Whoever wins the majority of votes in the state is awarded all 4 electoral votes. Their chosen electors then vote for president and vice president. Although electors are pledged to their candidate and running mate, they are not obligated to vote for them. An elector who votes for someone other than his or her candidate is known as a faithless elector.

The electors of each state and the District of Columbia met on December 13, 2004, to cast their votes for president and vice president. The Electoral College itself never meets as one body. Instead the electors from each state and the District of Columbia met in their respective capitols.

The following were the members of the Electoral College from the state. All 4 were pledged for Kerry/Edwards:

1. Jeanne Shaheen
2. Peter Burling
3. Judy Reardon
4. James Ryan

== See also ==
- Presidency of George W. Bush
- United States presidential elections in New Hampshire
