= 2008 United States presidential election in New Hampshire =

- November 4, 2008

Nominee	Barack Obama	John McCain
Party	Democratic	Republican
Home state	Illinois	Arizona
Running mate	Joe Biden	Sarah Palin
Electoral vote	4	0
Popular vote	384,826	316,534
Percentage	54.13%	44.52%

Obama
40–50%
50–60%
60–70%
70–80%
80–90%
90–100%
McCain
40–50%
50–60%
60–70%
70–80%
Tie/No data
40–50%
President before election
George W. Bush
Republican
Elected President
Barack Obama
Democratic

The 2008 United States presidential election in New Hampshire took place on November 4, 2008, as part of the 2008 United States presidential election throughout all 50 states and the District of Columbia. Voters chose four representatives, or electors to the Electoral College, who voted for president and vice president.

Democratic nominee Barack Obama won New Hampshire with a margin of 9.61%. Obama took 54.13% to Republican John McCain's 44.52%. Prior to the election, all 17 news organizations considered this a state Obama would win, or otherwise considered as a safe blue state. The state was originally thought to be a swing state in 2008 for a number of reasons. New Hampshire is considerably more fiscally conservative than its neighbors in New England and has a strong disdain for taxes, giving the Republicans an edge in the state. However, like the rest of New England, it is considerably more liberal on social issues like abortion and gay rights, which helps the Democrats. Also, McCain was very popular among Republicans based on the fact that he won both the 2000 and 2008 primaries here. In 2008, Obama lost the primary to Hillary Clinton. However, after the onset of the Great Recession, Obama pulled away in the pre-election polls.

The 2008 result made Barack Obama the first Democratic presidential nominee to sweep all ten of New Hampshire's counties since native son Franklin Pierce in 1852. As of the 2024 election this is the last election in which a presidential candidate of either party won all ten counties in New Hampshire and the last election where the Democratic candidate won Belknap County. Obama even won a majority of the vote in traditionally staunchly Republican Carroll County, the only county in all of New England to have voted for Republican Barry Goldwater in the 1964 United States presidential election. Carroll County had not given a majority to a Democratic presidential nominee since 1884 or voted Democratic since 1912.

To date, this is the last time the towns of Clarksville, Errol, Meredith, Middleton, Milton, and Stewartstown voted Democratic.

== Primaries ==
New Hampshire hosts the first primary in the nation. A state law that was passed in 1975 required that the date be set at least one week before any other similar contest. The Iowa caucuses are the only delegate-choosing event before the New Hampshire primary, but since Iowa hosts caucuses, not primaries, that is not seen as violating the law.

=== Democratic ===
The purpose of the New Hampshire Democratic primary on January 8, 2008, was to determine the number of delegates from New Hampshire that would represent a certain candidate at the National Convention. In a primary, members of a political party—in this case, the Democratic Party—will select the candidates to a subsequent election. Since 1920, New Hampshire has always hosted the first primaries in the entire nation. The Democratic Party's primary occurred on the same day as the Republican primary.

Hillary Clinton was the winner of the popular vote in the primary, with Barack Obama trailing in second. Clinton's win was the first time a woman had ever won a major American party's presidential primary for the purposes of delegate selection. (Shirley Chisholm's prior win in New Jersey in 1972 was in a no-delegate-awarding, presidential preference ballot that the major candidates were not listed in and that the only other candidate who was listed had already withdrawn from; the actual delegate selection vote went to George McGovern.) However, Clinton and Obama received an equal number of delegates to the National Convention since the percentages of their votes were close.

After Obama became the Democratic Party's presumptive nominee on June 3, the New Hampshire Delegation to the 2008 Democratic National Convention unanimously cast its 30 formal votes for him, one of only three states to do so.

==== Voter eligibility ====
Any registered voter may participate in New Hampshire's primary. Voters must declare a party affiliation so that they could participate in only one primary every year, not both the Democratic and Republican primaries.

==== Delegate allocation ====
The voters will elect delegates to the district-level events; a candidate will only receive delegates to the national convention if he or she receives at least 15% of the district voters' votes. 30 delegates will be proportionally sent to the national convention.

Any votes cast for a candidate that did not meet the 15% threshold for votes will be discarded. 14 district delegates will be proportionally allocated to each viable presidential candidate based on the primary's results in each Congressional District. All of the district delegates are considered pledged delegates, which means that they must openly commit to a candidate before the vote and are subject to review by the candidate they represent. Both the First Congressional District and Second Congressional District are allocated 7 district delegates each. These delegates independently represent each Congressional District; they are not affected by the results of the entire state.

In addition, there are 8 more pledged delegates that are allocated based on the results of the statewide primary. 5 of them would be at-large delegates to the national convention. These at-large delegates are usually selected by district-level delegates. The other 3 pledged delegates will be Party Leaders and Elected Official (PLEO) delegates. PLEO delegates usually consist of members of the Democratic National Committee, Democratic members of Congress, Democratic Governors, and former Democratic Party leaders.

While the 14 district delegates and 8 statewide delegates are pledged to represent a candidate, 8 more National Convention delegates will be considered unpledged. 7 of them are additional PLEO delegates, which consist of 4 Democratic National Committee members, 2 members of Congress, and 1 Governor. An additional unpledged delegate will be considered the add-on delegate. The add-on delegate is selected by a committee of district-level delegates.

==== Polling and predictions ====
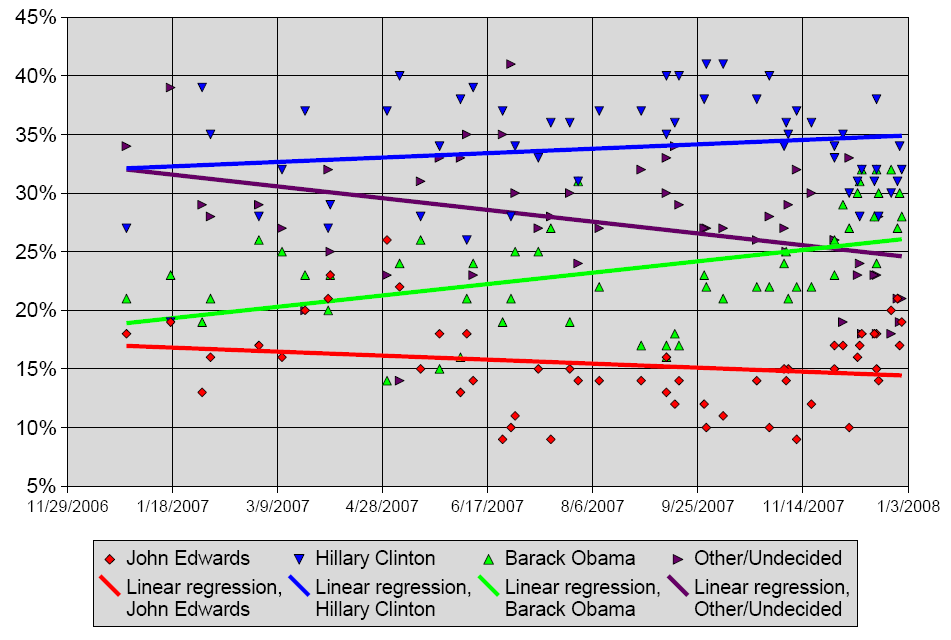
Pre-primary opinion polling statistics throughout the campaign season.

5 days before the New Hampshire primary, candidates competed at caucuses in Iowa. Barack Obama hoped that he would win these primaries the same way he defeated Hillary Clinton at the Iowa caucuses. Since his victory, he had attracted several supporters, which increased his chances at winning this primary. Likewise, Clinton was struggling to overcome setbacks after she came in third place at the caucuses in Iowa. A series of pre-primary polls showed that Obama enjoyed a significant lead. Clinton was coming second, and John Edwards third. Average polling during the period of January 5 to January 7, 2008, by Real Clear Politics indicated Obama's support at 38.3%, Clinton at 30.0%, Edwards at 18.3%, and Richardson at 5.7%. These results indicated an 8.3% lead for Obama.

A USA Today/Gallup poll indicated that Barack Obama enjoyed a 13-point lead over Hillary Clinton three weeks after they were tied in the pre-primary polls at New Hampshire. The USA Today/Gallup poll was held on January 4, 2008. The conductors of this poll surveyed 778 New Hampshire residents who most-likely were going to attend the Democratic primaries. The survey was conducted after news from the Iowa caucuses had been reported. In the following table, the candidates' support on January 4 is compared with the results of the USA Today/Gallup poll from mid-December 2007 in New Hampshire.

Candidate	Percentage (December)	Percentage (January)
Barack Obama	32%	41%
Hillary Clinton	32%	28%
John Edwards	18%	19%
Bill Richardson	8%	6%

No other candidate had higher than 3% support in New Hampshire. Each figure has a margin of error of ±4%. Obama's 13-point lead was outside that margin.

A US Census in 2006 reported that the population of New Hampshire was 1,314,895. 356,897 did not declare a party affiliation. These independent voters make up 44% of the New Hampshire electorate and could have voted in either the Democratic primary or the Republican Party's primary, but couldn't have voted in both. Democratic voters made up a smaller proportion. 216,005 people have registered as a Democrat. These statistics are important because in 2004, the New Hampshire independents leaned towards the Democratic side in favor of then-candidate John Kerry. Since then, New Hampshire has become more Democratic, replacing their Republican governor and state legislature with a government led by Democratic politicians. However, the people of New Hampshire are divided into several smaller regions, so the entire state as a whole wouldn't have been expected to act in a uniform manner.

==== New Hampshire campaign office hostage-taking ====
On November 30, 2007, a man identified as 47-year-old Leeland Eisenberg, armed with road flares strapped to his chest which he claimed were a bomb, entered a Clinton presidential campaign office in Rochester, New Hampshire. He took hostage the 5 people in it, and asked for Clinton, believing she could assist him in gaining psychiatric help. Two hostages were released early on, a woman and her infant. Other hostages were released sporadically. The standoff ended with Eisenberg's surrender about five hours after the incident began.

At the time of the event, Clinton was in the Washington, D.C. area, scheduled to speak at a Democratic National Committee meeting in Vienna, Virginia; she canceled her appearances at public events for the remainder of the day. That evening, she flew to Rochester in order to meet with and comfort the hostages, praise the law enforcement officials who handled the situation, and vow not to change her campaign style due to the incident.

==== Results ====
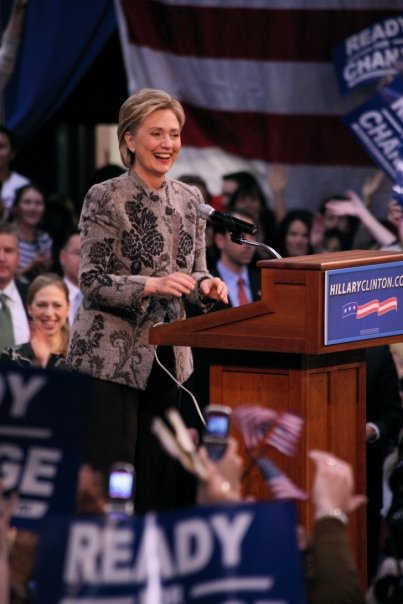
Hillary Clinton greets supporters after her New Hampshire Primary win.

Key:	Withdrew prior to contest

2008 New Hampshire Democratic presidential primary
Candidate	Results			Estimated national delegates
Candidate	Votes	Percentage	National delegates	Estimated national delegates
Hillary Clinton	112,404	39.09%	9	9
Barack Obama	104,815	36.45%	9	13
John Edwards	48,699	16.94%	4	0
Bill Richardson	13,239	4.6%	0	0
Dennis Kucinich	3,891	1.35%	0	0
Joe Biden	638	0.22%	0	0
Mike Gravel	404	0.14%	0	0
Total	287,557	100%	22	22

Hillary Clinton led Barack Obama by 20 points in pre-primary polls in New Hampshire prior to the Iowa caucuses, but had fallen behind Obama by 13 points in the week prior to the New Hampshire primary. However, she rebounded to get more votes than Obama in the New Hampshire primary, winning by 3%. According to exit polls, female voters and elderly voters helped her win this particular race. In the Iowa caucuses, Obama received 35% of the female vote, while Clinton only received 30%. In New Hampshire, however, 45% supported Clinton, compared to 36% for Obama. Also during the primary, older voters outnumbered younger voters; 67% of Democratic voters were over the age of 40, and most of them supported Clinton.

A turnout of nearly 288,000 people was even higher than expected, and was greater than the number of New Hampshire residents who voted for Al Gore in 2000.

Bill Richardson withdrew from the race after placing 4th in both the New Hampshire primary with less than 5% of the vote and the Iowa caucuses with less than 2% of the vote. He made this decision as he returned to his home state, New Mexico, on January 9, 2008, to meet with his top advisors.

=== Republican ===
The New Hampshire Republican primary also took place on January 8, 2008, with 12 national delegates being allocated proportionally to the popular vote. Arizona Senator John McCain won 7 of the delegates.

Independent voters made up 44% of the New Hampshire electorate and could choose to vote in either this primary or the Democratic Party's contest held on the same day, but voters could not vote in both.

==== Polling ====
In the days leading up to the primary, John McCain appeared to gain a slight lead over Mitt Romney. Average support from polls were McCain, 31.8%; Romney, 28.2%; Huckabee, 12.2%; Giuliani, 9.3%; Paul, 8.2%; Thompson, 2.2%.

==== Results ====
The official return was certified by the New Hampshire Secretary of State on 9 January. According to New Hampshire law, delegates are allocated proportionally with a minimum 10% threshold required to receive delegates. The balance of delegates that are not assigned are then allocated to the winner.

Candidate	Votes	Percentage	Delegates
John McCain	88,571	37.71%	7
Mitt Romney	75,546	32.17%	4
Mike Huckabee	26,859	11.44%	1
Rudy Giuliani	20,439	8.7%	0
Ron Paul	18,308	7.8%	0
Fred Thompson	2,890	1.23%	0
Duncan Hunter	1,217	0.52%	0
Alan Keyes	203	0.09%	0
Stephen Marchuk	123	0.05%	0
Tom Tancredo*	80	0.03%	0
Dr Hugh Cort	53	0.02%	0
Cornelius Edward O'Connor	45	0.02%	0
Albert Howard	44	0.02%	0
Vern Wuensche	44	0.02%	0
Vermin Supreme	41	0.02%	0
John H. Cox	39	0.02%	0
Daniel Gilbert	33	0.01%	0
James Creighton Mitchell Jr.	30	0.01%	0
Jack Shepard	27	0.01%	0
Mark Klein	19	0.01%	0
H. Neal Fendig Jr.	13	0%	0
Scattered	227	0.1%	0
Total	234,851	100%	12

* Candidate had already dropped out of the race prior to primary.

=== Recount ===
Most New Hampshire voters cast their votes on Diebold optical-scan systems, which read paper ballots. Some activists claimed to find evidence suggesting fraud, largely because results did not match pre-election polling for Obama and Clinton, and because of different levels of support between precincts where ballots were counted by hand and those where they were counted by machine. Most observers have concluded that discrepancies were the result of the fact that ballots are more likely to be hand-counted in small towns and machine-counted in cities and larger towns, explaining differences in candidate support.

On January 10, 2008, presidential candidate Dennis Kucinich paid for a recount in the Democratic primary. Republican candidate Albert Howard also requested a recount in the Republican primary. Kucinich noted the difference between pre-primary polls which showed that Obama would win, and Clinton's win in the actual election. New Hampshire had not conducted a statewide recount in a presidential primary since the 1980 primary.

The recount began on January 16, 2008, after New Hampshire Secretary of State Bill Gardner received $27,000 from Kucinich. The results in both parties changed little: Republican results changed only by 1 vote for Romney, while Democrats changed less than 1%, much of which was due to vote miscounting was Ward 5 in Manchester, where votes for the top candidates dropped after the recount. Clinton's total went from 683 to 619, Obama's went from 404 to 365, and other candidates saw similar drops. Excluding the results of Ward 5 the error rate was less than 1%. The official explanation for the discrepancies in Ward 5 was that a poll worker added the vice presidential and presidential totals before reporting.

The recount was halted on January 23, 2008. The Deputy Secretary of State, David Scanlan, estimated that the Republican recount cost $57,600 and the Democratic recount, with more votes cast, cost $67,600.

== Campaign ==
=== Predictions ===
There were 16 news organizations who made state-by-state predictions of the election. Here are their last predictions before election day:

Source	Ranking
D.C. Political Report	Likely D
Cook Political Report	Safe D
The Takeaway	Solid D
Electoral-vote.com	Solid D
Washington Post	Solid D
Politico	Safe D
RealClearPolitics	Solid D
FiveThirtyEight	Solid D
CQ Politics	Safe D
The New York Times	Solid D
CNN	Lean D
NPR	Solid D
MSNBC	Safe D
Fox News	Likely D
Associated Press	Likely D
Rasmussen Reports	Safe D

=== Polling ===
Pre-election polling showed a tight race early on. But since September 22, Obama swept the rest of the polls taken in the state. Since October 1, Obama never polled below 50%.

=== Fundraising ===
John McCain raised a total of $867,279 in the state. Barack Obama raised $2,470,579.

=== Advertising and visits ===
Obama and his interest groups spent $10,931,32. McCain and his interest groups spent $6,478,902. Each campaign visited the state 6 times.

== Analysis ==
Throughout the second half of the 20th century, New Hampshire was one of the most reliably Republican states in the Northeast. From 1948 to 1988, it only supported a Democrat once, in Lyndon Johnson's 44-state landslide of 1964. However, since 1992 it has become a swing state that leans slightly Democratic in presidential elections. The last Republican to carry the state was George W. Bush, who won by a narrow margin in 2000. New Hampshire was the only switchover state that Kerry won in 2004 and Bush lost. Moreover, the New Hampshire Republican Party is considerably more moderate and libertarian-leaning especially on social issues, making the behavior of the state difficult to predict.

Republicans had remained fairly competitive at the state level until November 2006 when Democratic Governor John Lynch was reelected to a second term with 74% of the vote. At the same time, two unknown Democrats knocked off the state's two incumbent Republicans in the U.S. House of Representatives and Democrats swept to control of both chambers of the state legislature for the first time since 1874. This led pundits to joke that the national Democratic wave of 2006 came ashore in Nashua. Continuing on that trend, New Hampshire looked very favorable to the Democrats heading into 2008.

Republican presidential nominee John McCain had early hopes for winning the state. New Hampshire strongly supported McCain in the 2000 and 2008 Republican primaries, attracted by his status as an independent maverick; New Hampshire voters have historically been friendly to independent-minded Republicans. After he clinched the GOP nomination in March 2008, McCain began to move more to the right to appease the base of his party, and his selection of the socially conservative Governor of Alaska Sarah Palin to be the vice presidential nominee alienated several independents and libertarian-leaning Republicans in New Hampshire. Democratic presidential nominee Barack Obama campaigned extensively throughout the state in 2008 to try and unite the party in the general election after the historic and divisive 2008 Democratic primary. Despite the polls that had Obama leading by double digits, New Hampshire voters gave a surprise comeback win to Hillary Rodham Clinton in the January 2008 New Hampshire Democratic Primary thanks in large part to an enormous number of women who turned out to support Clinton after her emotional moment at a campaign stop in Portsmouth a few days earlier. Obama acknowledged this phenomenon throughout the campaign when he advised his supporters not to get so cocky and arrogant when they saw the polls that had him leading.

Early polling during the general campaign showed Obama with a very narrow lead. By early October, Obama had gained a double-digit lead in the state and never looked back. Obama successfully carried New Hampshire with 54.13% of the total statewide vote while McCain received 44.52%.

At the same time, popular incumbent Democratic Governor Lynch was reelected to a third term in a landslide over Republican Joe Keeney and Libertarian Susan Newell. Lynch received 70.12% while Keeney took in 27.70% and Newell with 2.18%. Former Democratic Governor Jeanne Shaheen ousted incumbent Republican U.S. Senator John Sununu by a 6.34% margin of victory, giving the Democrats an additional seat in the U.S. Senate. However, Republicans also picked up 14 seats in the New Hampshire House of Representatives.

== Results ==
2008 United States presidential election in New Hampshire
Party	Candidate	Running mate	Votes	Percentage	Electoral votes
Democratic	Barack Obama	Joe Biden	384,826	54.16%	4
Republican	John McCain	Sarah Palin	316,534	44.52%	0
Others	Others		3,890	0.54%	0
Independent	Ralph Nader	Matt Gonzalez	3,503	0.49%	0
Libertarian	Bob Barr	Wayne Allyn Root	2,217	0.31%	0
Totals			710,970	100.00%	4
Voter turnout (Voting age population)					70.0%

=== By county ===
County	Barack Obama Democratic		John McCain Republican		Various candidates Other parties		Margin		Total votes cast
County	#	%	#	%	#	%	#	%	Total votes cast
Belknap	16,796	49.97%	16,402	48.80%	416	1.23%	394	1.17%	33,614
Carroll	15,221	52.39%	13,387	46.07%	448	1.54%	1,834	6.32%	29,056
Cheshire	26,971	62.98%	15,205	35.51%	647	1.51%	11,766	27.47%	42,823
Coos	9,532	58.31%	6,558	40.11%	258	1.58%	2,974	18.20%	16,348
Grafton	31,446	63.03%	17,687	35.45%	757	1.52%	13,759	27.58%	49,890
Hillsborough	104,820	51.20%	97,178	47.47%	2,711	1.33%	7,642	3.73%	204,709
Merrimack	45,078	56.27%	34,010	42.46%	1,018	1.27%	11,068	13.81%	80,106
Rockingham	83,723	49.89%	81,917	48.81%	2,182	1.30%	1,806	1.08%	167,822
Strafford	37,990	59.50%	25,021	39.19%	837	1.31%	12,969	20.31%	63,848
Sullivan	13,249	58.23%	9,169	40.30%	336	1.47%	4,080	17.93%	22,754
Totals	384,826	54.13%	316,534	44.52%	9,610	1.35%	68,292	9.61%	710,970

Counties that flipped from Republican to Democratic

- Belknap (largest city: Laconia)
- Carroll (largest town: Conway)
- Hillsborough (largest city: Manchester)
- Rockingham (largest town: Derry)

=== By congressional district ===
Barack Obama swept both of New Hampshire's congressional districts.

District	Obama	McCain	Representative
1st	52.68%	46.47%	Carol Shea-Porter (D)
2nd	56.09%	43.00%	Paul Hodes (D)

== Electors ==
Technically the voters of New Hampshire cast their ballots for electors: representatives to the Electoral College. New Hampshire is allocated 4 electors because it has 2 congressional districts and 2 senators. All candidates who appear on the ballot or qualify to receive write-in votes must submit a list of 4 electors, who pledge to vote for their candidate and his or her running mate. Whoever wins the majority of votes in the state is awarded all 4 electoral votes. Their chosen electors then vote for president and vice president. Although electors are pledged to their candidate and running mate, they are not obligated to vote for them. An elector who votes for someone other than his or her candidate is known as a faithless elector.

The electors of each state and the District of Columbia met on December 15, 2008, to cast their votes for president and vice president. The Electoral College itself never meets as one body. Instead the electors from each state and the District of Columbia met in their respective capitols.

The following were the members of the Electoral College from the state. All 4 were pledged to Barack Obama and Joe Biden:

1. Martha Fuller Clark
2. Gaeten DiGangi
3. Ned Helms
4. Kathleen Sullivan

== See also ==
- Presidency of Barack Obama
- United States presidential elections in New Hampshire
