= Margaret A. Ramsay =

American politician

Member of the New Hampshire House of Representatives from the Cheshire 5th district
- In office 1974–1982

Member of the New Hampshire House of Representatives from the Cheshire 10th district
- In office 1982–1988

Personal details
- Born: January 4, 1935
- Died: October 13, 2023 (aged 88)
- Party: Democratic

Margaret A. Ramsay (January 4, 1935 – October 13, 2023) was an American politician. A member of the Democratic Party, she served in the New Hampshire House of Representatives from 1976 to 1988.

Ramsay died at her home on October 13, 2023, at the age of 88.
