= 1888 United States presidential election in New Hampshire =

- November 6, 1888
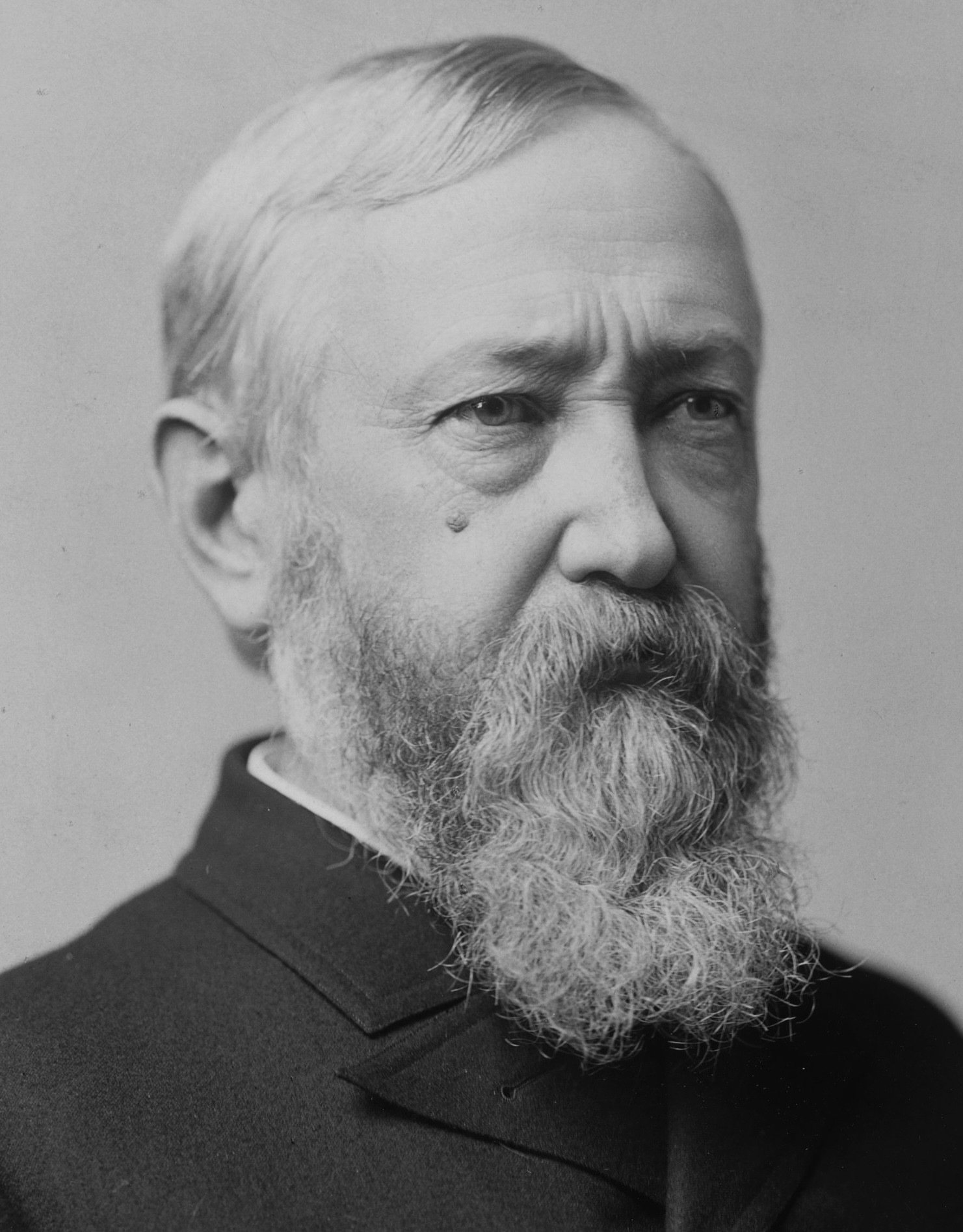

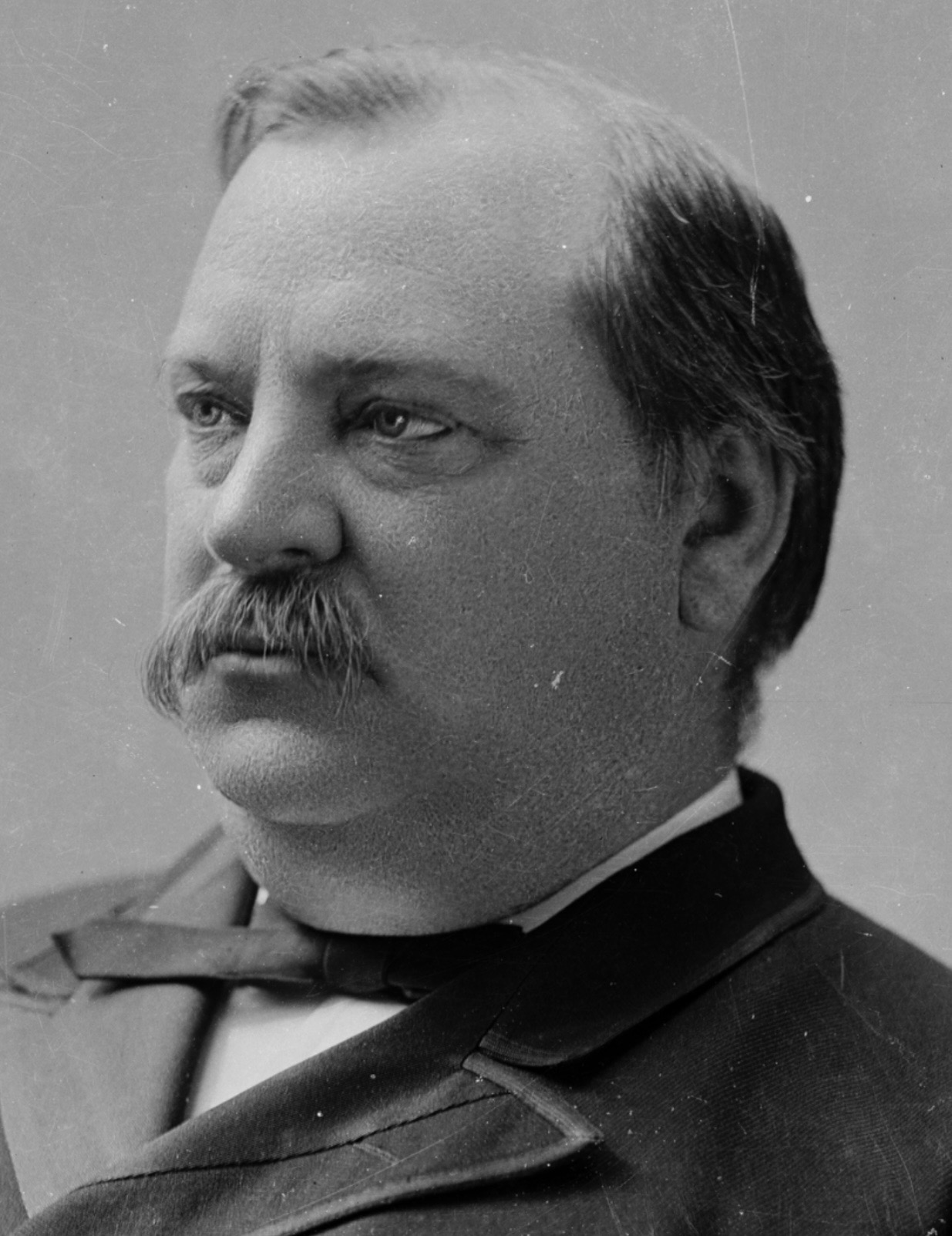
| Nominee | Benjamin Harrison | Grover Cleveland |
| Party | Republican | Democratic |
| Home state | Indiana | New York |
| Running mate | Levi P. Morton | Allen G. Thurman |
| Electoral vote | 4 | 0 |
| Popular vote | 45,728 | 43,456 |
| Percentage | 50.34% | 47.84% |

Harrison
40–50%
50–60%
60–70%
70–80%
Cleveland
40–50%
50–60%
60–70%
70–80%
80–90%
90–100%
President before election
Grover Cleveland
Democratic
Elected President
Benjamin Harrison
Republican

The 1888 United States presidential election in New Hampshire took place on November 6, 1888, as part of the 1888 United States presidential election. Voters chose four representatives, or electors to the Electoral College, who voted for president and vice president.

New Hampshire voted for the Republican nominee, Benjamin Harrison, over the Democratic nominee, incumbent President Grover Cleveland. Harrison won the state by a narrow margin of 2.50%.

This would be the last election when bellwether Coös County in the far north voted for a losing presidential candidate until voting for Hubert Humphrey over Richard Nixon in 1968. It would also be the last election when a Democratic presidential candidate carried Merrimack and Rockingham Counties until 1912, when the Republican Party was divided between Progressive Theodore Roosevelt and conservative incumbent President William Howard Taft, and the last when those two gave a majority to the Democrat until Lyndon B. Johnson in 1964. Harrison was the first Republican to ever win without Rockingham County.

== Results ==
1888 United States presidential election in New Hampshire
| Party | Candidate | Running mate | Popular vote | | Electoral vote | |
| Party | Candidate | Running mate | Count | % | Count | % |
|---|---|---|---|---|---|---|
| Republican | Benjamin Harrison of Indiana | Levi P. Morton of New York | 45,728 | 50.34% | 4 | 100.00% |
| Democratic | Grover Cleveland of New York (incumbent) | Allen G. Thurman of Ohio | 43,456 | 47.84% | 0 | 0.00% |
| Prohibition | Clinton B. Fisk of New Jersey | John A. Brooks of Missouri | 1,593 | 1.75% | 0 | 0.00% |
| N/A | Others | Others | 58 | 0.06% | 0 | 0.00% |
| Total | | | 90,835 | 100.00% | 4 | 100.00% |

=== Results by county ===
| | Benjamin Harrison Republican | | Grover Cleveland Democratic | | Clinton B. Fisk Prohibition | | Various candidates Other parties | | Margin | | Total votes cast (Note: These figures differ somewhat from those in Dave Leip’s U.S. Election Atlas.) |
| County | # | % | # | % | # | % | # | % | # | % | # |
|---|---|---|---|---|---|---|---|---|---|---|---|
| Belknap | 2,687 | 50.32% | 2,540 | 47.57% | 113 | 2.12% | | | 147 | 2.75% | 5,340 |
| Carroll | 2,338 | 47.39% | 2,434 | 49.33% | 162 | 3.28% | | | -96 | -1.95% | 4,934 |
| Cheshire | 4,118 | 55.70% | 3,165 | 42.81% | 110 | 1.49% | | | 953 | 12.89% | 7,393 |
| Coös | 2,298 | 45.18% | 2,744 | 53.95% | 44 | 0.87% | | | -446 | -8.77% | 5,086 |
| Grafton | 5,210 | 49.73% | 5,075 | 48.44% | 191 | 1.82% | | | 135 | 1.29% | 10,476 |
| Hillsborough | 9,460 | 52.07% | 8,440 | 46.46% | 268 | 1.48% | | | 1,020 | 5.61% | 18,168 |
| Merrimack | 6,004 | 48.14% | 6,121 | 49.08% | 346 | 2.77% | | | -117 | -0.94% | 12,471 |
| Rockingham | 6,451 | 48.86% | 6,552 | 49.63% | 200 | 1.51% | | | -101 | -0.76% | 13,203 |
| Strafford | 4,580 | 51.28% | 4,271 | 47.82% | 80 | 0.90% | | | 309 | 3.46% | 8,931 |
| Sullivan | 2,588 | 54.95% | 2,040 | 43.31% | 82 | 1.74% | | | 548 | 11.63% | 4,710 |
| Totals | 45,734 | 50.38% | 43,382 | 47.79% | 1,596 | 1.76% | 58 (Note: These votes are not separated by county in the Géoelections data.) | 0.06% | 2,352 | 2.59% | 90,770 |

== See also ==
- United States presidential elections in New Hampshire
