= Merrimack County, New Hampshire =

County in New Hampshire, United States

- County
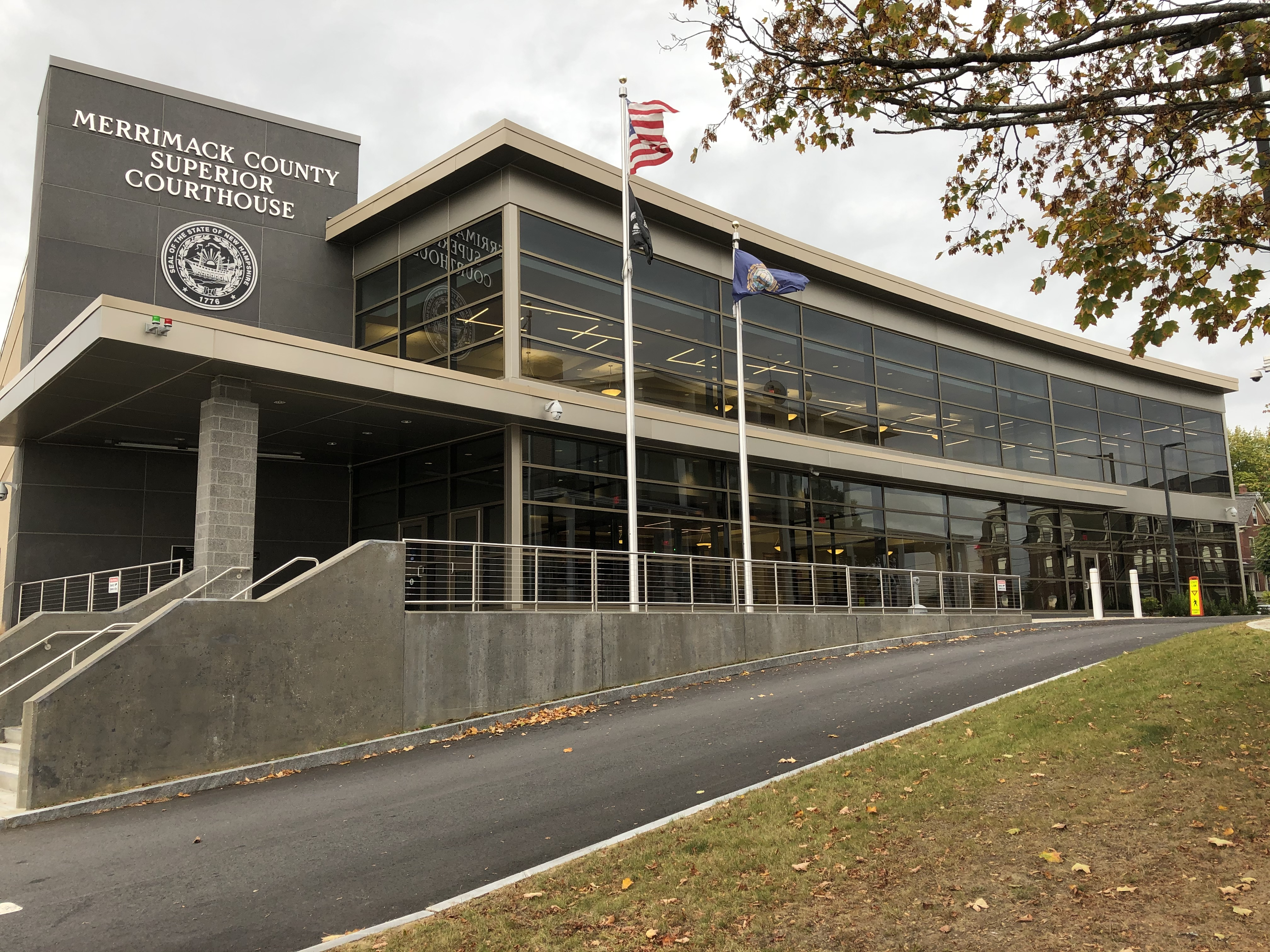
- Merrimack County Courthouse, 2019

- Flag Seal

- Location within the U.S. state of New Hampshire
- Coordinates: 43°18′N 71°41′W
- Country: United States
- State: New Hampshire
- Founded: 1823
- Named for: Merrimack River
- Seat: Concord
- Largest city: Concord

Area
  - Total: 955.0 sq mi (2,473 km^{2})
  - Land: 932.9 sq mi (2,416 km^{2})
  - Water: 22.1 sq mi (57 km^{2}) 2.3%

Population (2020)
  - Total: 153,808
  - Estimate (2025): 158,078 ▲
  - Density: 169.2/sq mi (65.3/km^{2})
- Time zone: UTC−5 (Eastern)
  - Summer (DST): UTC−4 (EDT)
- Congressional districts: 1st, 2nd
- Website: www.merrimackcounty.net

Merrimack County is a county in the U.S. state of New Hampshire. As of the 2020 Census, the population was 153,808, making it the third most populous county in New Hampshire. Its county seat is Concord, the state capital. The county was organized in 1823 from parts of Hillsborough and Rockingham counties, and is named for the Merrimack River. Merrimack County comprises the Concord, NH Micropolitan Statistical Area, which in turn constitutes a portion of the Boston–Worcester–Providence, MA–RI–NH–CT Combined Statistical Area. In 2010, the center of population of New Hampshire was located in Merrimack County, in the town of Pembroke.

== Geography ==
According to the United States Census Bureau, the county has a total area of 956 square miles (2,480 km^{2}), of which 934 square miles (2,420 km^{2}) is land and 22 square miles (57 km^{2}) (2.3%) is water. It is the third largest county in New Hampshire by land area. The highest point in Merrimack County is Mount Kearsarge, on the border of Warner and Wilmot, at 2,937 feet (895 m).

=== Adjacent counties ===
- Belknap County (northeast)
- Strafford County (east)
- Rockingham County (southeast)
- Hillsborough County (south)
- Sullivan County (west)
- Grafton County (northwest)

=== National protected area ===
- John Hay National Wildlife Refuge

== Demographics ==
Historical population
Census	Pop.	Note	%±
1830	34,614		—
1840	36,253		4.7%
1850	40,337		11.3%
1860	41,408		2.7%
1870	42,151		1.8%
1880	46,300		9.8%
1890	49,435		6.8%
1900	52,430		6.1%
1910	53,335		1.7%
1920	51,770		−2.9%
1930	56,152		8.5%
1940	60,710		8.1%
1950	63,022		3.8%
1960	67,785		7.6%
1970	80,925		19.4%
1980	98,302		21.5%
1990	120,005		22.1%
2000	136,225		13.5%
2010	146,445		7.5%
2020	153,808		5.0%
2025 (est.)	158,078	▲	2.8%
U.S. Decennial Census; 1790–1960 1900–1990; 1990–2000 2010–2020

=== 2020 census ===
As of the 2020 census, the county had a population of 153,808. The median age was 43.4 years. 18.6% of residents were under the age of 18 and 19.4% of residents were 65 years of age or older. For every 100 females there were 98.0 males, and for every 100 females age 18 and over there were 96.9 males age 18 and over.

Per the 2020 census, the racial makeup of the county was 90.0% White, 1.7% Black or African American, 0.2% American Indian and Alaska Native, 2.0% Asian, 0.0% Native Hawaiian and Pacific Islander, 0.9% from some other race, and 5.1% from two or more races. Hispanic or Latino residents of any race comprised 2.5% of the population.

The 2020 census indicated that 45.4% of residents lived in urban areas, while 54.6% lived in rural areas.

There were 60,420 households in the county, of which 26.7% had children under the age of 18 living with them and 24.2% had a female householder with no spouse or partner present. About 26.7% of all households were made up of individuals and 12.1% had someone living alone who was 65 years of age or older.

There were 65,565 housing units, of which 7.8% were vacant. Among occupied housing units, 71.6% were owner-occupied and 28.4% were renter-occupied. The homeowner vacancy rate was 0.9% and the rental vacancy rate was 4.2%.

Merrimack County, New Hampshire – Racial and ethnic composition Note: the US Census treats Hispanic/Latino as an ethnic category. This table excludes Latinos from the racial categories and assigns them to a separate category. Hispanics/Latinos may be of any race.
Race / Ethnicity (NH = Non-Hispanic)	Pop 2000	Pop 2010	Pop 2020	% 2000	% 2010	% 2020
White alone (NH)	131,343	138,048	137,252	96.41%	94.26%	89.23%
Black or African American alone (NH)	688	1,452	2,536	0.50%	0.99%	1.64%
Native American or Alaska Native alone (NH)	286	355	310	0.20%	0.24%	0.20%
Asian alone (NH)	1,158	2,307	3,013	0.85%	1.57%	1.95%
Pacific Islander alone (NH)	28	40	59	0.02%	0.02%	0.03%
Other race alone (NH)	91	104	575	0.06%	0.07%	0.37%
Mixed race or Multiracial (NH)	1,269	1,800	6,183	0.93%	1.22%	4.01%
Hispanic or Latino (any race)	1,362	2,339	3,880	0.99%	1.59%	2.52%
Total	136,225	146,445	153,808	100.00%	100.00%	100.00%

=== 2010 census ===
As of the census of 2010, there were 146,445 people, 57,069 households, and 38,104 families living in the county. The population density was 156.8 inhabitants per square mile (60.5/km^{2}). There were 63,541 housing units at an average density of 68.0 per square mile (26.3/km^{2}). The racial makeup of the county was 95.3% white, 1.6% Asian, 1.0% black or African American, 0.3% American Indian, 0.3% from other races, and 1.4% from two or more races. Those of Hispanic or Latino origin made up 1.6% of the population. In terms of ancestry, 20.5% were English, 20.4% were Irish, 10.1% were German, 9.7% were Italian, 9.7% were French Canadian, 5.2% were Scottish, and 4.9% were American.

Of the 57,069 households, 31.3% had children under the age of 18 living with them, 52.4% were married couples living together, 9.9% had a female householder with no husband present, 33.2% were non-families, and 25.4% of all households were made up of individuals. The average household size was 2.46 and the average family size was 2.94. The median age was 41.4 years.

The median income for a household in the county was $63,012 and the median income for a family was $75,268. Males had a median income of $50,880 versus $37,351 for females. The per capita income for the county was $30,544. About 5.2% of families and 8.1% of the population were below the poverty line, including 10.6% of those under age 18 and 7.4% of those age 65 or over.

=== 2000 census ===
As of the census of 2000, there were 136,225 people, 51,843 households, and 35,460 families living in the county. The population density was 146 inhabitants per square mile (56/km^{2}). There were 56,244 housing units at an average density of 60 units per square mile (23/km^{2}). The racial makeup of the county was 97.08% White, 0.54% Black or African American, 0.23% Native American, 0.86% Asian, 0.02% Pacific Islander, 0.23% from other races, and 1.04% from two or more races. 1.00% of the population were Hispanic or Latino of any race. 16.5% were of English, 13.4% Irish, 12.7% French, 11.0% French Canadian, 8.4% American, 6.4% German and 6.0% Italian ancestry. 94.2% spoke English, 2.9% French and 1.1% Spanish as their first language.

There were 51,843 households, out of which 33.90% had children under the age of 18 living with them, 54.90% were married couples living together, 9.80% had a female householder with no husband present, and 31.60% were non-families. 24.60% of all households were made up of individuals, and 9.00% had someone living alone who was 65 years of age or older. The average household size was 2.51 and the average family size was 3.00.

In the county, the population was spread out, with 24.90% under the age of 18, 8.10% from 18 to 24, 30.60% from 25 to 44, 24.00% from 45 to 64, and 12.40% who were 65 years of age or older. The median age was 38 years. For every 100 females, there were 97.00 males. For every 100 females age 18 and over, there were 93.70 males.

The median income for a household in the county was $48,522, and the median income for a family was $56,842. Males had a median income of $37,722 versus $27,207 for females. The per capita income for the county was $23,208. About 4.10% of families and 5.90% of the population were below the poverty line, including 6.60% of those under age 18 and 5.70% of those age 65 or over.

== Politics and government ==
United States presidential election results for Merrimack County, New Hampshire
Year	Republican		Democratic		Third party(ies)	
Year	No.	%	No.	%	No.	%
1876	5,660	49.85%	5,687	50.08%	8	0.07%
1880	5,935	49.95%	5,922	49.84%	26	0.22%
1884	6,005	50.59%	5,513	46.45%	351	2.96%
1888	6,001	48.14%	6,119	49.09%	346	2.78%
1892	6,116	49.69%	5,919	48.09%	274	2.23%
1896	7,715	65.67%	3,310	28.17%	724	6.16%
1900	7,517	57.65%	5,248	40.25%	274	2.10%
1904	7,433	59.74%	4,740	38.09%	270	2.17%
1908	6,932	56.51%	4,846	39.50%	489	3.99%
1912	4,632	39.08%	4,741	40.00%	2,480	20.92%
1916	5,970	49.16%	5,967	49.14%	207	1.70%
1920	12,748	58.28%	8,976	41.04%	148	0.68%
1924	13,587	59.88%	8,283	36.50%	822	3.62%
1928	15,724	60.63%	10,139	39.09%	72	0.28%
1932	13,986	51.98%	12,805	47.59%	117	0.43%
1936	14,456	51.05%	13,645	48.18%	218	0.77%
1940	14,923	50.39%	14,692	49.61%	0	0.00%
1944	14,599	52.17%	13,382	47.82%	2	0.01%
1948	16,586	59.37%	11,171	39.99%	178	0.64%
1952	21,824	67.92%	10,310	32.08%	0	0.00%
1956	22,060	71.68%	8,711	28.31%	3	0.01%
1960	20,395	60.57%	13,278	39.43%	0	0.00%
1964	12,564	38.80%	19,818	61.20%	0	0.00%
1968	19,289	57.94%	12,711	38.18%	1,292	3.88%
1972	25,354	67.70%	11,737	31.34%	362	0.97%
1976	21,853	58.62%	14,865	39.87%	564	1.51%
1980	23,584	56.21%	12,083	28.80%	6,293	15.00%
1984	27,925	67.16%	13,510	32.49%	144	0.35%
1988	29,535	60.66%	18,637	38.28%	514	1.06%
1992	22,114	37.59%	24,437	41.54%	12,283	20.88%
1996	21,231	37.78%	29,381	52.28%	5,588	9.94%
2000	30,028	47.15%	30,622	48.08%	3,034	4.76%
2004	36,060	47.05%	39,975	52.15%	612	0.80%
2008	34,010	42.46%	45,078	56.27%	1,018	1.27%
2012	34,524	42.88%	44,756	55.59%	1,234	1.53%
2016	37,674	45.04%	40,198	48.06%	5,776	6.91%
2020	39,711	44.06%	48,533	53.85%	1,889	2.10%
2024	43,364	46.63%	48,181	51.81%	1,448	1.56%

Merrimack County was reliably Republican through most of its history, with Democrats only carrying the county in four out of 29 presidential elections from 1876 to 1988. Since then, Democrats have carried the county every time.

=== County Commission ===
The executive power of Merrimack County's government is held by three county commissioners, each representing one of the three commissioner districts within the county.

District	Commissioner	Hometown	Party
1	Steve Shurtleff	Concord	Democratic
2	Stuart Trachy	Franklin	Republican
3	David Lovlien Jr.	Pembroke	Republican

In addition to the County Commission, there are five directly elected officials: they include County Attorney, Register of Deeds, County Sheriff, Register of Probate, and County Treasurer.

Office	Name
County Attorney	Paul Halvorsen (R)
Register of Deeds	Erica Davis (D)
County Sheriff	David Croft (D)
Register of Probate	Jane Bradstreet (D)
County Treasurer	Mary Heath (R)

=== Legislative branch ===
The legislative branch of Merrimack County is made up of all of the members of the New Hampshire House of Representatives from the county. In total, as of 2022 there are 45 members from 30 different districts.

Affiliation	Members	Voting share
Democratic Party	25	56.5%
Republican Party	20	43.5%
Total	45	100%

== Communities ==
=== Cities ===
- Concord (county seat)
- Franklin

=== Towns ===
- Allenstown
- Andover
- Boscawen
- Bow
- Bradford
- Canterbury
- Chichester
- Danbury
- Dunbarton
- Epsom
- Henniker
- Hill
- Hooksett
- Hopkinton
- Loudon
- New London
- Newbury
- Northfield
- Pembroke
- Pittsfield
- Salisbury
- Sutton
- Warner
- Webster
- Wilmot

=== Census-designated places ===
- Blodgett Landing
- Bradford
- Contoocook
- Henniker
- Hooksett
- Loudon
- New London
- Pittsfield
- South Hooksett
- Suncook
- Tilton Northfield
- Warner

=== Villages ===
- East Andover
- Elkins
- North Sutton
- Penacook
- South Newbury
- South Sutton

== Education ==
School districts include:

K-12 districts:

- Bow School District
- Concord School District
- Franklin School District
- Hopkinton School District
- Kearsarge Regional School District
- Merrimack Valley School District
- Newfound Area School District
- Pembroke School District
- Pittsfield School District
- Shaker Regional School District
- Winnisquam Regional School District

Secondary districts:

- John Stark Regional School District

Elementary districts:

- Allenstown School District
- Andover School District
- Chichester School District
- Dunbarton School District
- Epsom School District
- Henniker School District
- Hill School District
- Hooksett School District

Hooksett sends its high school students to Pinkerton Academy, a privately endowed publicly funded high school in Derry, Rockingham County. Previously Hooksett sent high school students to the Manchester School District.

== See also ==
- National Register of Historic Places listings in Merrimack County, New Hampshire
