= Hillsborough County, New Hampshire =

County in New Hampshire, United States

- County
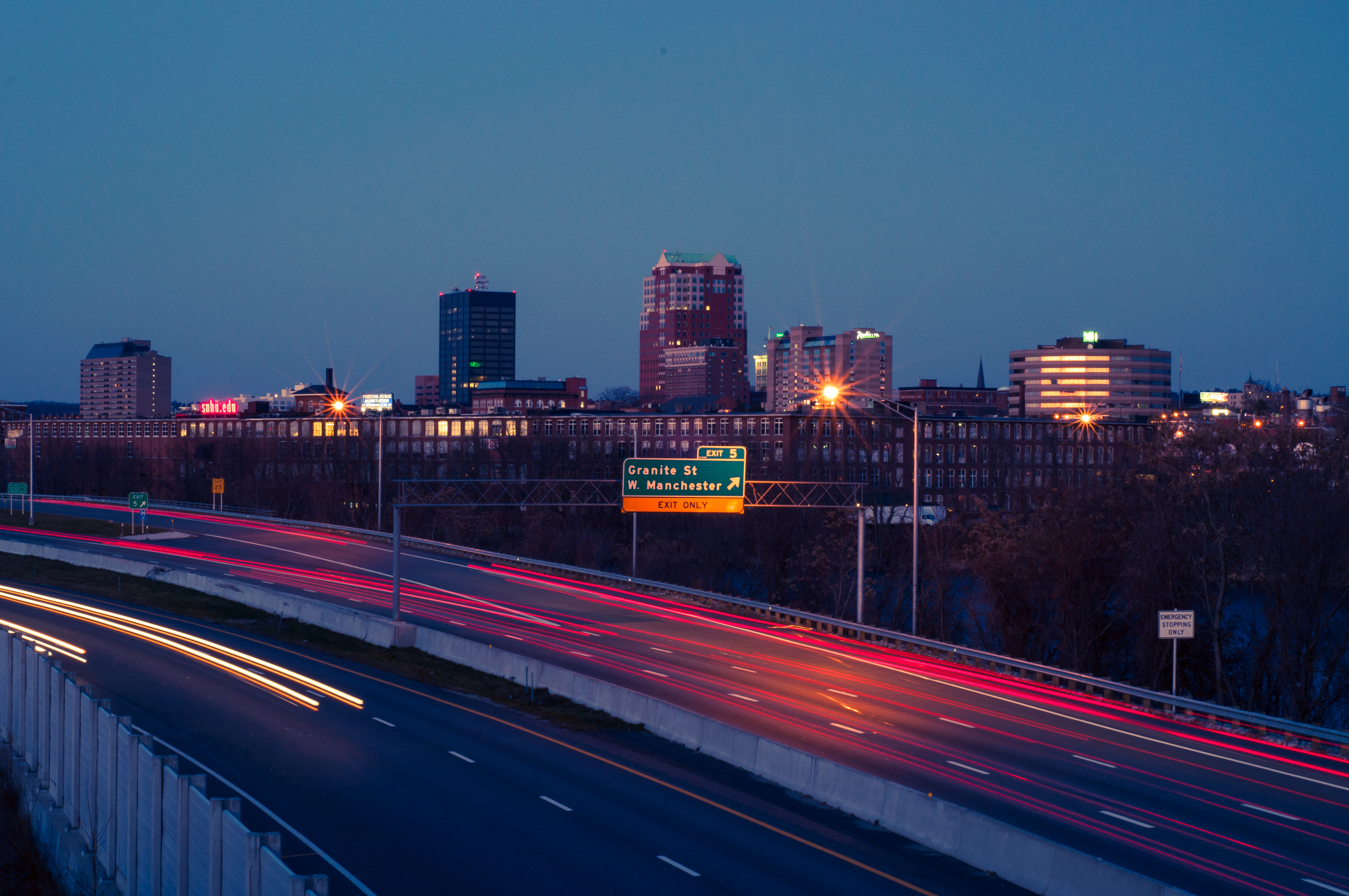
- Manchester skyline

- Flag Seal

- Location within the U.S. state of New Hampshire
- Coordinates: 42°53′44″N 71°34′58″W
- Country: United States
- State: New Hampshire
- Founded: 1769
- Named for: The Earl of Hillsborough
- Seat: Manchester and Nashua
- Largest city: Manchester

Area
  - Total: 892.5 sq mi (2,312 km^{2})
  - Land: 876.5 sq mi (2,270 km^{2})
  - Water: 15.9 sq mi (41 km^{2}) 1.8%

Population (2020)
  - Total: 422,937
  - Estimate (2025): 433,415 ▲
  - Density: 491.1/sq mi (189.6/km^{2})
- Time zone: UTC−5 (Eastern)
  - Summer (DST): UTC−4 (EDT)
- Congressional districts: 1st, 2nd
- Website: hcnh.org

Hillsborough County is the most populous county in the U.S. state of New Hampshire. As of the 2020 census, the population was 422,937, almost one-third the population of the entire state. Its county seats are Manchester and Nashua, the state's two biggest cities. Hillsborough is northern New England's most populous county as well as its most densely populated.

Hillsborough County comprises the Manchester-Nashua, NH Metropolitan Statistical Area, which in turn constitutes a portion of the Boston-Worcester-Providence, MA-RI-NH-CT Combined Statistical Area.

== History ==
Hillsborough was one of the five original counties identified for the old Province of New Hampshire in 1769, and was named for Wills Hill, 1st Earl of Hillsborough, who was British Secretary of State for the Colonies at the time. The county was formally organized at Amherst on March 19, 1771.

In 1823, twelve townships of Hillsborough Country – Andover, Boscawen, Bradford, Dunbarton, Fishersfield (now Newbury), Henniker, Hooksett, Hopkinton, New London, Salisbury, Sutton, and Warner – became part of Merrimack County. The town of Merrimack along the Merrimack River in south-central Hillsborough County was not included in the newly formed county 9 miles (14 km) to the north. Hillsborough County's administrative functions were moved from Amherst to Milford in 1866, and then to the current seats of Manchester and Nashua in 1869.

== Geography ==
According to the United States Census Bureau, the county has a total area of 892 square miles (2,310 km^{2}), of which 876 square miles (2,270 km^{2}) is land and 16 square miles (41 km^{2}) (1.8%) is water. The highest point in Hillsborough county is Pack Monadnock Mountain at 2,290 feet (700 m).

=== Adjacent counties ===
- Merrimack County (north)
- Rockingham County (east)
- Essex County, Massachusetts (southeast)
- Middlesex County, Massachusetts (south)
- Worcester County, Massachusetts (southwest)
- Cheshire County (west)
- Sullivan County (northwest)

=== National protected area ===
- Wapack National Wildlife Refuge

== Politics and government ==
2020 presidential election by voting ward in Hillsborough County

In the 2012 presidential election, Time had listed Hillsborough as one of five critical counties affecting the outcome in the swing state of New Hampshire. Obama ended up winning with a margin of 50%–49%.

Despite its more urban nature, Hillsborough County has historically been a more Republican leaning part of the state. But in 2020, Joe Biden and Jeanne Shaheen won Hillsborough County by a wider margin than they won statewide by. Biden also received the highest percentage of the vote for a Democrat since Lyndon Johnson's 1964 landslide, largely driven due to large swings to Democrats in the county's historically Republican suburban communities. In 2024, the county voted for Democratic nominee Kamala Harris, the first time it voted for a Democrat who lost the presidential election since 1968.

United States presidential election results for Hillsborough County, New Hampshire
Year	Republican		Democratic		Third party(ies)	
Year	No.	%	No.	%	No.	%
1876	8,190	54.57%	6,790	45.24%	29	0.19%
1880	8,689	55.10%	7,001	44.39%	80	0.51%
1884	8,540	53.31%	7,075	44.17%	404	2.52%
1888	9,460	52.08%	8,439	46.45%	267	1.47%
1892	9,875	52.08%	8,785	46.33%	303	1.60%
1896	13,080	67.80%	4,965	25.73%	1,248	6.47%
1900	12,653	58.76%	8,339	38.72%	543	2.52%
1904	12,603	57.54%	8,831	40.32%	470	2.15%
1908	12,568	57.29%	8,701	39.66%	669	3.05%
1912	8,007	35.92%	8,909	39.96%	5,378	24.12%
1916	9,927	46.33%	10,939	51.05%	562	2.62%
1920	23,040	54.44%	18,736	44.27%	546	1.29%
1924	22,098	51.66%	16,002	37.41%	4,673	10.93%
1928	24,465	45.23%	29,457	54.46%	165	0.31%
1932	23,308	41.50%	32,458	57.79%	395	0.70%
1936	23,293	38.07%	34,992	57.20%	2,895	4.73%
1940	26,201	38.09%	42,580	61.91%	0	0.00%
1944	25,921	37.99%	42,306	62.00%	9	0.01%
1948	28,257	39.94%	41,789	59.07%	696	0.98%
1952	41,263	49.68%	41,802	50.32%	0	0.00%
1956	45,248	55.50%	36,234	44.44%	46	0.06%
1960	38,430	42.43%	52,135	57.57%	0	0.00%
1964	29,503	32.88%	60,236	67.12%	0	0.00%
1968	42,409	46.01%	45,423	49.28%	4,337	4.71%
1972	65,274	64.39%	34,739	34.27%	1,364	1.35%
1976	53,581	53.11%	45,544	45.15%	1,755	1.74%
1980	68,994	59.84%	31,789	27.57%	14,521	12.59%
1984	81,462	70.68%	33,314	28.91%	475	0.41%
1988	88,261	65.00%	45,799	33.73%	1,718	1.27%
1992	61,620	39.04%	58,470	37.04%	37,750	23.92%
1996	59,441	40.54%	71,282	48.61%	15,912	10.85%
2000	80,649	48.65%	77,625	46.83%	7,487	4.52%
2004	99,724	51.03%	94,121	48.16%	1,582	0.81%
2008	97,178	47.47%	104,820	51.20%	2,711	1.32%
2012	99,991	48.62%	102,303	49.74%	3,373	1.64%
2016	100,013	46.70%	99,589	46.50%	14,555	6.80%
2020	104,625	45.16%	122,344	52.81%	4,690	2.02%
2024	112,057	47.80%	118,776	50.66%	3,608	1.54%

=== County Commission ===
The executive power of Hillsborough County's government is held by three county commissioners, each representing one of the three commissioner districts within the county.

District	Commissioner	Hometown	Party
1	Toni Pappas	Manchester	Republican
2	Michael Soucy	Nashua	Republican
3	Robert Rowe	Amherst	Republican

In addition to the county commission, there are five directly elected officials; they include county attorney, register of deeds, county sheriff, register of probate, and county treasurer.

Office	Name
County Attorney	John Coughlin (R)
Register of Deeds	Dennis Hogan (R)
County Sheriff	Christopher Connelly (R)
Register of Probate	Christopher Maidment (R)
County Treasurer	David Fredette (R)

=== County Convention ===
The legislative branch of Hillsborough County, also known as the County Convention or County Delegation, is made up of all of the members of the New Hampshire House of Representatives from the county. As of 2022, there are 123 members from 45 districts.

Affiliation	Members	Voting share
Democratic Party	72	58.5%
Republican Party	51	41.5%
Total	123	100%

== Demographics ==
Historical population
Census	Pop.	Note	%±
1790	32,883		—
1800	43,899		33.5%
1810	49,249		12.2%
1820	53,884		9.4%
1830	37,724		−30.0%
1840	42,494		12.6%
1850	57,478		35.3%
1860	62,140		8.1%
1870	64,238		3.4%
1880	75,634		17.7%
1890	93,247		23.3%
1900	112,640		20.8%
1910	126,072		11.9%
1920	135,512		7.5%
1930	140,165		3.4%
1940	144,888		3.4%
1950	156,987		8.4%
1960	178,161		13.5%
1970	223,941		25.7%
1980	276,608		23.5%
1990	336,073		21.5%
2000	380,841		13.3%
2010	400,721		5.2%
2020	422,937		5.5%
2025 (est.)	433,415	▲	2.5%
U.S. Decennial Census; 1790–1960 1900–1990; 1990–2000 2010–2020

=== 2020 census ===
2020 American Community Survey Population Estimates, Race and Hispanic Origin
Race	Percentage
White, not Hispanic or Latino	83%
Asian	6%
Hispanic or Latino	8%
Black or African American	3%

As of the 2020 census, the county had a population of 422,937, and the median age was 40.9 years. 20.0% of residents were under the age of 18 and 16.6% of residents were 65 years of age or older. For every 100 females there were 98.5 males, and for every 100 females age 18 and over there were 96.9 males age 18 and over. The population density was 482.8 inhabitants per square mile (186.4/km^{2}).

The racial makeup of the county was 82.8% White, 2.6% Black or African American, 0.2% American Indian and Alaska Native, 3.9% Asian, 0.0% Native Hawaiian and Pacific Islander, 3.5% from some other race, and 6.9% from two or more races. Hispanic or Latino residents of any race comprised 7.9% of the population.

75.6% of residents lived in urban areas, while 24.4% lived in rural areas.

There were 167,875 households in the county, of which 28.1% had children under the age of 18 living with them and 23.7% had a female householder with no spouse or partner present. About 26.6% of all households were made up of individuals and 10.3% had someone living alone who was 65 years of age or older.

There were 175,571 housing units, of which 4.4% were vacant. Among occupied housing units, 64.9% were owner-occupied and 35.1% were renter-occupied. The homeowner vacancy rate was 0.7% and the rental vacancy rate was 4.2%.

Hillsborough County, New Hampshire – Racial and ethnic composition Note: the US Census treats Hispanic/Latino as an ethnic category. This table excludes Latinos from the racial categories and assigns them to a separate category. Hispanics/Latinos may be of any race.
Race / Ethnicity (NH = Non-Hispanic)	Pop 2000	Pop 2010	Pop 2020	% 2000	% 2010	% 2020
White alone (NH)	351,337	351,224	342,652	92.35%	87.64%	81.01%
Black or African American alone (NH)	4,493	7,405	10,044	1.17%	1.84%	2.37%
Native American or Alaska Native alone (NH)	824	742	630	0.21%	0.18%	0.14%
Asian alone (NH)	7,554	12,898	16,413	1.98%	3.21%	3.88%
Pacific Islander alone (NH)	102	99	112	0.02%	0.02%	0.02%
Other race alone (NH)	559	975	2,383	0.14%	0.24%	0.56%
Mixed race or Multiracial (NH)	3,806	6,137	17,205	0.99%	1.53%	4.06%
Hispanic or Latino (any race)	12,166	21,241	33,498	3.19%	5.30%	7.92%
Total	380,841	400,721	422,937	100.00%	100.00%	100.00%

=== 2010 census ===
As of the 2010 census, the racial makeup of the county was 81.0% white, 4.8% Asian, 3.9% black or African American, 1.7% American Indian, 2.1% from other races, and 2.0% from two or more races. Those of Hispanic or Latino origin made up 8% of the population.

=== 2011–2015 American Community Survey ===
For the period 2011–2015, 24.8% of the county's population had French ancestry (including 9.9% of the total population with French Canadian ancestry), 20.9% had Irish, 13.1% had English, 10.2% had Italian, and 8.2% had German ancestry. For the same time period, the estimated median annual income for a household in the county was $71,244, and the median income for a family was $85,966. Male full-time workers had a median income of $60,349 versus $44,270 for females. The per capita income for the county was $35,242. About 5.8% of families and 8.8% of the population were below the poverty line, including 11.7% of those under age 18 and 5.9% of those age 65 or over.

== Communities ==
=== Cities ===
- Manchester (county seat)
- Nashua (county seat)

=== Towns ===
- Amherst
- Antrim
- Bedford
- Bennington
- Brookline
- Deering
- Francestown
- Goffstown
- Greenfield
- Greenville
- Hancock
- Hillsborough
- Hollis
- Hudson
- Litchfield
- Lyndeborough
- Mason
- Merrimack
- Milford
- Mont Vernon
- New Boston
- New Ipswich
- Pelham
- Peterborough
- Sharon
- Temple
- Weare
- Wilton
- Windsor

=== Census-designated places ===
- Amherst
- Antrim
- Bennington
- East Merrimack
- Francestown
- Goffstown
- Greenville
- Hancock
- Hillsborough
- Hudson
- Klondike Corner
- Milford
- New Boston
- Peterborough
- Pinardville
- Wilton

=== Villages ===
- Grasmere
- West Peterborough

=== Former towns ===
- Monson

== Education ==
School districts include:

K-12 districts:

- Bedford School District
- Contoocook Valley School District
- Goffstown School District
- Hillsboro-Deering Cooperative School District
- Hudson School District
- Litchfield School District
- Manchester School District
- Mascenic Regional School District
- Merrimack School District
- Milford School District
- Nashua School District
- Pelham School District
- Wilton-Lyndeborough School District
- Windsor School District

Secondary districts:

- Hollis-Brookline Cooperative School District
- Souhegan Cooperative School District
- John Stark Regional School District

Elementary districts:

- Amherst School District
- Brookline School District
- Hollis School District
- Mason School District
- Mont Vernon School District
- New Boston School District
- Weare School District

Previously Bedford sent high school students to the Manchester School District.

== See also ==
- National Register of Historic Places listings in Hillsborough County, New Hampshire
