= 1968 United States presidential election in New Hampshire =

1968 United States presidential election In New Hampshire
- November 5, 1968

Nominee	Richard Nixon	Hubert Humphrey
Party	Republican	Democratic
Home state	New York (Note: Although he was born in California and he served as a U.S. senator from California, in 1968 Richard Nixon’s official state of residence was New York, because he moved there to practice law after his defeat in the 1962 California gubernatorial election. During his first term as president, Nixon re-established his residency in California. Consequently, most reliable reference books list Nixon’s home state as New York in the 1968 election and his home state as California in the 1972 (and 1960) election.)	Minnesota
Running mate	Spiro Agnew	Edmund Muskie
Electoral vote	4	0
Popular vote	154,903	130,589
Percentage	52.10%	43.93%

Nixon
40–50%
50–60%
60–70%
70–80%
80–90%
90–100%
Humphrey
40–50%
50–60%
60–70%
Tie
40–50%
President before election
Lyndon B. Johnson
Democratic
Elected President
Richard Nixon
Republican

The 1968 United States presidential election in New Hampshire took place on November 5, 1968, as part of the 1968 United States presidential election, which was held throughout all 50 states and the District of Columbia. Voters chose four representatives, or electors to the Electoral College, who voted for president and vice president.

New Hampshire was won by the Republican nominees, former Vice President Richard Nixon of California and his running mate Governor Spiro Agnew of Maryland. Nixon and Agnew defeated the Democratic nominees, incumbent Vice President Hubert H. Humphrey of Minnesota and his running mate Senator Edmund Muskie of Maine.

Nixon took 52.10% of the vote to Humphrey's 43.93%, a margin of 8.18%.

Like the rest of Upper New England, New Hampshire in this era normally leaned Republican, however the state had voted overwhelmingly Democratic just four years earlier in 1964, when the staunch conservatism of Republican Barry Goldwater drove the liberal Northeastern United States, including New Hampshire, to deliver landslide victories to Democratic incumbent Lyndon B. Johnson. In 1964 Johnson had carried New Hampshire by a landslide 64–36 margin.

In 1968, the GOP sought to recover from their crippling defeat with Goldwater, and the party looked to former Vice President and the party’s narrowly defeated 1960 presidential nominee, Richard Nixon. Nixon was seen as a mainstream moderate Republican who could unite the competing factions of the Republican Party, and win back the moderate voters that Goldwater had alienated. The party recovered successfully and won back the White House and New Hampshire was returned to the Republican column. However, with four of the six New England states voting for Humphrey, New Hampshire became one of the two New England states (the other being neighboring Vermont) to vote for Nixon.

The “George Wallace Party” candidate, Southern populist Governor George Wallace of Alabama, did not have a serious impact on the race. While taking 13.53% nationally and winning electoral votes from five Southern states, Wallace would take only 3.76% of the vote in New Hampshire. Wallace’s base of support was in the South, and he had practically no appeal in Northeastern states like New Hampshire. New Hampshire would be Wallace’s fifth weakest state in the nation.

Nixon's victory was the first of six consecutive Republican victories in the state, as New Hampshire would not vote for a Democratic candidate again until Bill Clinton in 1992, after which it has always gone Democratic except in 2000 when George W. Bush very narrowly won the state over Al Gore.

== Results ==
1968 United States presidential election in New Hampshire
Party	Candidate	Votes	Percentage	Electoral votes
Republican	Richard Nixon	154,903	52.10%	4
Democratic	Hubert H. Humphrey	130,589	43.93%	0
George Wallace Party	George Wallace	11,173	3.76%	0
New Party Electors	No Candidate (Note: These electors were originally pledged to Eugene McCarthy but withdrew their pledge before the poll.)	421	0.14%	0
Write-ins	Write-ins	109	0.04%	0
Socialist Workers	Fred Halstead	104	0.03%	0
Totals		297,299	100.00%	4
Voter Turnout (Voting age/Registered)				70%/79%

=== Results by county ===
County	Richard Nixon Republican		Hubert Humphrey Democratic		George Wallace George Wallace Party		Various candidates Other parties		Margin		Total votes cast
County	#	%	#	%	#	%	#	%	#	%	Total votes cast
Belknap	8,642	61.42%	4,942	35.12%	454	3.23%	33	0.23%	3,700	26.30%	14,071
Carroll	6,795	72.93%	2,163	23.22%	348	3.74%	11	0.12%	4,632	49.71%	9,317
Cheshire	10,702	52.64%	9,135	44.93%	441	2.17%	54	0.27%	1,567	7.71%	20,332
Coös	6,822	44.02%	8,261	53.31%	399	2.57%	15	0.10%	-1,439	-9.29%	15,497
Grafton	12,881	59.76%	7,813	36.25%	727	3.37%	133	0.62%	5,068	23.51%	21,554
Hillsborough	42,409	46.01%	45,423	49.28%	4,231	4.59%	106	0.12%	-3,014	-3.27%	92,169
Merrimack	19,289	57.94%	12,711	38.18%	1,201	3.61%	90	0.27%	6,578	19.76%	33,291
Rockingham	28,842	54.98%	21,195	40.41%	2,333	4.45%	86	0.16%	7,647	14.57%	52,456
Strafford	12,427	47.28%	13,129	49.95%	650	2.47%	77	0.29%	-702	-2.67%	26,283
Sullivan	6,094	49.43%	5,817	47.19%	389	3.16%	28	0.23%	277	2.24%	12,328
Total	154,903	52.10%	130,589	43.93%	11,173	3.76%	634	0.21%	24,314	8.17%	297,299

==== Counties that flipped from Democratic to Republican ====
- Belknap
- Cheshire
- Grafton
- Merrimack
- Sullivan
- Rockingham

== Analysis ==
The county map results followed a familiar pattern of the post-New Deal era, with Nixon winning seven counties to Humphrey’s three. Since Franklin Roosevelt’s election in 1932, in every close election or Democratic victory, Hillsborough County, Strafford County, and Coös County would vote Democratic, while Carroll County would be the most Republican county. This pattern endured in 1968 for the last time, with Humphrey winning the three core New Deal Democratic counties, while Carroll County was the only county in the state where Nixon broke seventy percent of the vote. Humphrey's strongest county was Coös County, which he won by a 53–44 margin making this one of only three occurrences since 1892 where it has supported a losing presidential candidate. Nixon thus became the first Republican to win the White House without carrying Coös County since Benjamin Harrison in 1888 and the first ever to win without Strafford County.

As Nixon narrowly eked out a victory over Humphrey nationally, New Hampshire's results in 1968 made the state about 7% more Republican than the national average. As of 2024, this is the most recent election in which New Hampshire was not the most Republican state in New England, as Nixon won Vermont by a slightly wider margin. Hillsborough County would not vote Democratic again until 1996, and Strafford County until 1992. Nixon had previously won New Hampshire in 1960 and would later win it again in 1972.

Nixon's victory was the first of six consecutive Republican victories in the state, as New Hampshire would not vote for a Democratic candidate again until Bill Clinton in 1992, after which it has always gone Democratic except in 2000 when George W. Bush narrowly won the state over Al Gore.

== See also ==
- Presidency of Richard Nixon
- United States presidential elections in New Hampshire
