= 1996 United States presidential election in New Hampshire =

- November 5, 1996

Nominee	Bill Clinton	Bob Dole	Ross Perot
Party	Democratic	Republican	Reform
Home state	Arkansas	Kansas	Texas
Running mate	Al Gore	Jack Kemp	Pat Choate
Electoral vote	4	0	0
Popular vote	246,214	196,532	48,390
Percentage	49.32%	39.37%	9.69%

Clinton
40–50%
50–60%
60–70%
80–90%
Dole
40–50%
50–60%
60–70%
70–80%
Perot
90–100%
President before election
Bill Clinton
Democratic
Elected President
Bill Clinton
Democratic

The 1996 United States presidential election in New Hampshire took place on November 5, 1996, as part of the 1996 United States presidential election. Voters chose four representatives, or electors to the Electoral College, who voted for president and vice president.

Although traditionally a Republican state, 1996 would mark the second presidential election in a row that New Hampshire was won by Democrat Bill Clinton, by then the incumbent president. Clinton took 49.32% of the popular vote over Republican challenger Bob Dole, who took 39.37%, a victory margin of 9.95%. Reform Party candidate Ross Perot finished in third, with 9.69% of the popular vote.

Clinton's nearly 10-point victory in New Hampshire was much more convincing than his previous win in the state in 1992; that year he had only eked out a narrow plurality of 39% over George H. W. Bush's 38%, with Ross Perot taking nearly 23% of the vote. For a state that had voted over 60% Republican as recently as 1988, Clinton's victories represented a dramatic shift toward the Democratic Party in New Hampshire. Since then the state has voted Democratic in every presidential election, except in 2000, when George W. Bush eked out a narrow plurality win over Al Gore.

== Primaries ==
The New Hampshire Secretary of State set the primary for February 20, 1996, in accordance with state law requiring the primary to be held at least one week before another state's primary. However, Delaware held its primary in February 24, but New Hampshire declined to alter its date. Most of the major Republican presidential candidates and President Bill Clinton did not appear on the Delaware ballot.

74% of registered Republicans and 45% of registered Democrats participated in the primaries. 45 candidates filed to appear on the primary ballot.

=== Democratic primary ===
Bill Clinton easily won the Democratic primary.

1996 New Hampshire Democratic Primary
Candidate	Votes	%
Bill Clinton	76,797	84.37%
Pat Buchanan †	3,347	3.68%
Lamar Alexander †	1,888	2.07%
Steve Forbes †	1,294	1.42%
Bob Dole †	1,257	1.38%
Pat Paulsen	1,007	1.11%
Al Gore †	1,257	0.74%
Carmen C. Chimento	656	0.72%
Lyndon LaRouche	433	0.48%
Richard Lugar †	410	0.45%
Caroline Killeen	391	0.43%
Heather Anne Harder	369	0.40%
Bruce Daniels	312	0.34%
James D. Griffin	307	0.34%
Alan Keyes †	281	0.31%
Colin Powell †	280	0.31%
Ralph Nader †	187	0.20%
Morry Taylor †	167	0.18%
Stephen Michael	94	0.10%
Willie Felix Carter	85	0.09%
Robert Drucker	81	0.09%
David Pauling	74	0.08%
Vincent Hamm	72	0.08%
Ted Gunderson	70	0.08%
Frank Legas	63	0.07%
Robert Spangler	62	0.07%
Michael Dass	57	0.06%
Osie Thorpe	50	0.05%
Ben Tomeo	47	0.05%
Sal Casamassima	45	0.05%
John Safran	42	0.05%
Ross Perot †	41	0.04%
Phil Gramm †	25	0.03%
Robert Dornan †	21	0.02%
Charles Edwin Collins †	5	0.00%
Michael Stephen Levinson †	4	0.00%
George Bush †	3	0.00%
Harry Browne †	1	0.00%
Newt Gingrich †	1	0.00%
John Hurd †	1	0.00%
Irwin Schiff †	1	0.00%
Total	91,027	100.00%

† Indicates a write-in candidate

=== Republican primary ===
Republican primary county results Buchanan: 20–30% 30–40% 40–50% Dole: 20–30% Alexander: 20–30%

Paleo-conservative Journalist Pat Buchanan was making an insurgent rise, making a narrow upset victory over frontrunner Bob Dole by a margin of just 1% of the vote. Buchanan had previously performed strongly in New Hampshire, during his 1992 challenge against incumbent president George H.W. Bush. Buchanan's momentum from his victory in New Hampshire would prove short-lived, as Dole would sweep every state on Super Tuesday on his way to the nomination. Dole eventually lost to incumbent Democratic President Bill Clinton in the 1996 general election

Steve Forbes spent $3 million in New Hampshire.

1996 New Hampshire Republican Primary
Candidate	Votes	%
Pat Buchanan	56,874	27.25%
Bob Dole	54,738	26.22%
Lamar Alexander	47,148	22.59%
Steve Forbes	25,505	12.22%
Others	24,478	11.72%
Total	208,743	100.00%

=== Libertarian primary ===
Harry Browne won the Libertarian presidential primary against Irwin Schiff and write-in candidates.

=== VP Write-in ===
Colin Powell, who was not a candidate, won the Republican vice-presidential primary as a write-in. Al Gore won the Democratic vice-presidential primary. Schiff won the vice-presidential primary as a write-in.

== Results ==
1996 United States presidential election in New Hampshire
Party	Candidate	Votes	Percentage	Electoral votes
Democratic	Bill Clinton (incumbent)	246,214	49.32%	4
Republican	Bob Dole	196,532	39.37%	0
Reform	Ross Perot	48,390	9.69%	0
Libertarian	Harry Browne	4,237	0.85%	0
N/A	Write-ins	2,456	0.49%	0
NH Taxpayer	Howard Phillips (write-in)	1,346	0.27%	0
Totals		499,175	100.00%	4

=== Results by county ===
County	Bill Clinton Democratic		Bob Dole Republican		Ross Perot Reform		Harry Browne Libertarian		Various candidates Other parties		Margin		Total votes cast
County	#	%	#	%	#	%	#	%	#	%	#	%	Total votes cast
Belknap	10,345	43.81%	10,685	45.24%	2,297	9.73%	153	0.65%	136	0.58%	-340	-1.43%	23,616
Carroll	8,881	42.77%	9,168	44.16%	2,445	11.78%	131	0.63%	138	0.66%	-287	-1.39%	20,763
Cheshire	16,159	54.41%	10,252	34.52%	2,777	9.35%	199	0.67%	314	1.06%	5,907	19.89%	29,701
Coös	7,191	50.87%	4,703	33.27%	2,085	14.75%	83	0.59%	75	0.53%	2,488	17.60%	14,137
Grafton	19,496	52.99%	13,543	36.81%	3,237	8.80%	244	0.66%	272	0.74%	5,953	16.18%	36,792
Hillsborough	71,282	48.61%	59,441	40.54%	13,411	9.15%	1,374	0.94%	1,127	0.77%	11,841	8.07%	146,635
Merrimack	29,381	52.28%	21,231	37.78%	4,814	8.57%	428	0.76%	346	0.62%	8,150	14.50%	56,200
Rockingham	53,644	47.37%	46,201	40.80%	11,433	10.10%	1,121	0.99%	849	0.75%	7,443	6.57%	113,248
Strafford	23,475	54.79%	14,484	33.81%	4,088	9.54%	397	0.93%	399	0.93%	8,991	20.98%	42,843
Sullivan	8,380	48.55%	6,824	39.54%	1,803	10.45%	107	0.62%	146	0.85%	1,556	9.01%	17,260
Totals	246,214	49.32%	196,532	39.37%	48,390	9.69%	4,237	0.85%	3,802	0.76%	49,682	9.95%	499,175

Counties flipped from Republican to Democratic

- Hillsborough
- Rockingham

== See also ==
- Presidency of Bill Clinton
- United States presidential elections in New Hampshire

== Works cited ==
- Ladd, Karen (1997). State of New Hampshire Manual for the General Court. New Hampshire Department of State.
