= Cheshire County, New Hampshire =

County in New Hampshire, United States

- County
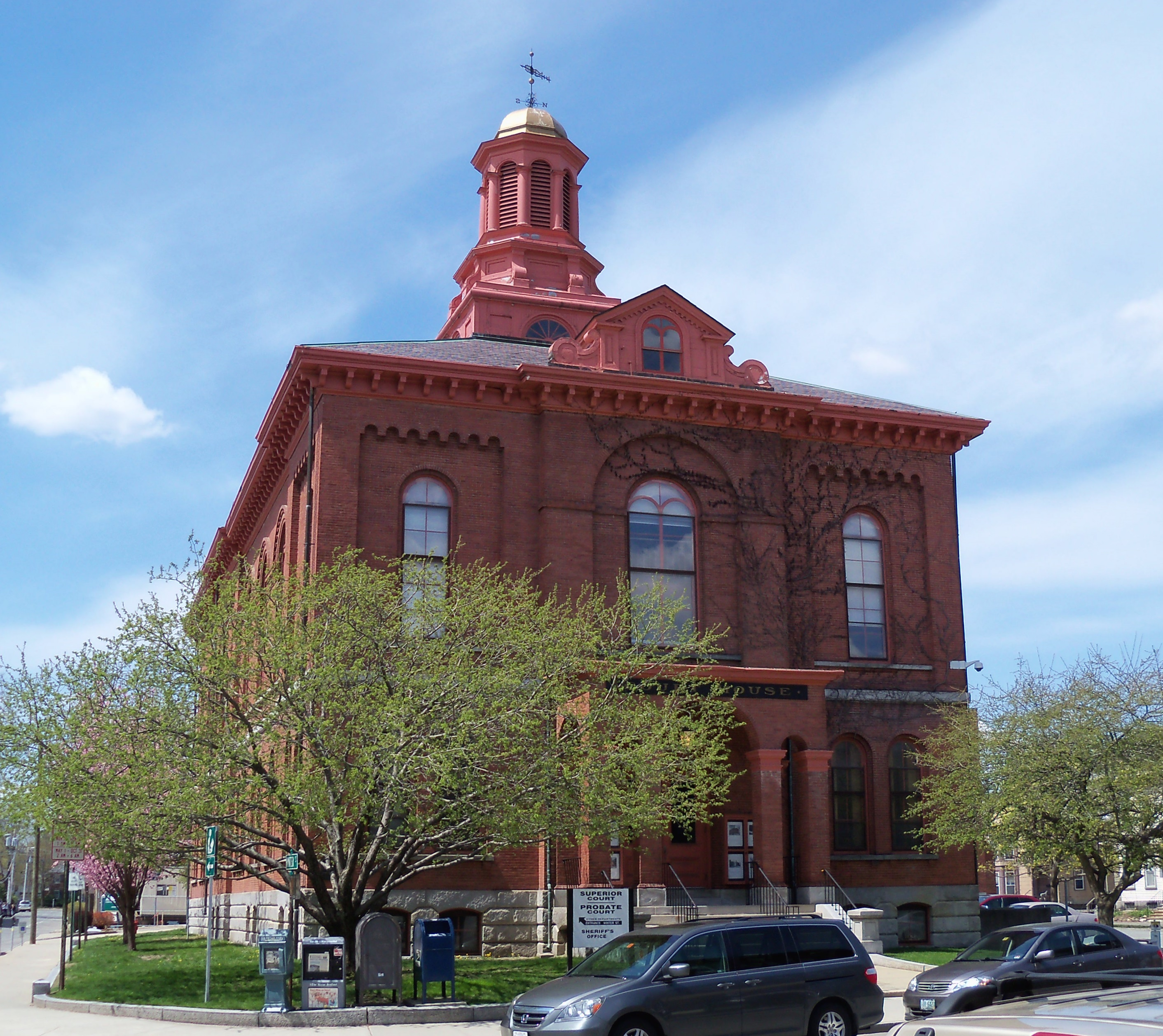
- Cheshire County Courthouse in Keene

- Flag Seal

- Location within the U.S. state of New Hampshire
- Coordinates: 42°54′42″N 72°14′31″W
- Country: United States
- State: New Hampshire
- Founded: 1769
- Named for: Cheshire, England
- Seat: Keene
- Largest city: Keene

Area
  - Total: 728.9 sq mi (1,888 km^{2})
  - Land: 706.7 sq mi (1,830 km^{2})
  - Water: 22.2 sq mi (57 km^{2}) 3.1%

Population (2020)
  - Total: 76,458
  - Estimate (2025): 78,269 ▲
  - Density: 108.2/sq mi (41.8/km^{2})
- Time zone: UTC−5 (Eastern)
  - Summer (DST): UTC−4 (EDT)
- Congressional district: 2nd
- Website: co.cheshire.nh.us

Cheshire County is a county in the southwestern corner of the U.S. state of New Hampshire. As of the 2020 census, the population was 76,458. Its county seat is the city of Keene. Cheshire was one of the five original counties of New Hampshire, and is named for the county of Cheshire in England. It was organized in 1771 at Keene. Sullivan County was created from the northern portion of Cheshire County in 1827. Cheshire County comprises the Keene, NH micropolitan statistical area.

== Geography ==
According to the U.S. Census Bureau, the county has an area of 729 square miles (1,890 km^{2}), of which 707 square miles (1,830 km^{2}) is land and 22 square miles (57 km^{2}) (3.1%) is water. The highest point in Cheshire County is Mount Monadnock, in the northwestern part of Jaffrey, at 3,165 feet (965 m).

=== Adjacent counties ===
- Sullivan County (north)
- Hillsborough County (east)
- Worcester County, Massachusetts (southeast)
- Franklin County, Massachusetts (southwest)
- Windham County, Vermont (west)

=== Geographical landmarks ===
- Mount Monadnock
- Pisgah State Park

== Demographics ==
Historical population
Census	Pop.	Note	%±
1790	28,753		—
1800	38,825		35.0%
1810	40,988		5.6%
1820	45,376		10.7%
1830	27,016		−40.5%
1840	26,429		−2.2%
1850	30,144		14.1%
1860	27,434		−9.0%
1870	27,265		−0.6%
1880	28,734		5.4%
1890	29,579		2.9%
1900	31,321		5.9%
1910	30,659		−2.1%
1920	30,975		1.0%
1930	33,685		8.7%
1940	34,953		3.8%
1950	38,811		11.0%
1960	43,342		11.7%
1970	52,364		20.8%
1980	62,116		18.6%
1990	70,121		12.9%
2000	73,825		5.3%
2010	77,117		4.5%
2020	76,458		−0.9%
2025 (est.)	78,269	▲	2.4%
U.S. Decennial Census; 1790-1960 1900-1990; 1990-2000 2010-2018

=== 2020 census ===
As of the 2020 census, the county had a population of 76,458. The median age was 43.6 years. 18.0% of residents were under the age of 18 and 21.2% of residents were 65 years of age or older. For every 100 females there were 96.8 males, and for every 100 females age 18 and over there were 95.1 males age 18 and over.

The racial makeup of the county was 91.4% White, 0.9% Black or African American, 0.2% American Indian and Alaska Native, 1.4% Asian, 0.1% Native Hawaiian and Pacific Islander, 0.8% from some other race, and 5.1% from two or more races. Hispanic or Latino residents of any race comprised 2.4% of the population.

30.9% of residents lived in urban areas, while 69.1% lived in rural areas.

There were 31,372 households in the county, of which 24.3% had children under the age of 18 living with them and 25.0% had a female householder with no spouse or partner present. About 29.4% of all households were made up of individuals and 13.4% had someone living alone who was 65 years of age or older.

There were 35,612 housing units, of which 11.9% were vacant. Among occupied housing units, 69.4% were owner-occupied and 30.6% were renter-occupied. The homeowner vacancy rate was 1.5% and the rental vacancy rate was 6.3%.

Cheshire County, New Hampshire – Racial and ethnic composition Note: the US Census treats Hispanic/Latino as an ethnic category. This table excludes Latinos from the racial categories and assigns them to a separate category. Hispanics/Latinos may be of any race.
Race / Ethnicity (NH = Non-Hispanic)	Pop 2000	Pop 2010	Pop 2020	% 2000	% 2010	% 2020
White alone (NH)	71,809	73,537	69,264	97.26%	95.35%	90.59%
Black or African American alone (NH)	250	363	648	0.33%	0.47%	0.84%
Native American or Alaska Native alone (NH)	209	171	146	0.28%	0.22%	0.19%
Asian alone (NH)	349	910	1,067	0.47%	1.18%	1.39%
Pacific Islander alone (NH)	25	19	46	0.03%	0.02%	0.06%
Other race alone (NH)	52	61	305	0.07%	0.07%	0.39%
Mixed race or Multiracial (NH)	602	966	3,180	0.81%	1.25%	4.15%
Hispanic or Latino (any race)	529	1,090	1,802	0.71%	1.41%	2.35%
Total	73,825	77,117	76,458	100.00%	100.00%	100.00%

=== 2010 census ===
As of the 2010 United States census, there were 77,117 people, 30,204 households, and 19,284 families living in the county. The population density was 109.1 inhabitants per square mile (42.1/km^{2}). There were 34,773 housing units at an average density of 49.2 per square mile (19.0/km^{2}). The county's racial makeup was 96.3% white, 1.2% Asian, 0.5% black or African American, 0.3% American Indian, 0.4% from other races, and 1.4% from two or more races. Those of Hispanic or Latino origin made up 1.4% of the population. In terms of ancestry, 20.7% were English, 19.1% were Irish, 12.0% were German, 8.8% were French Canadian, 8.7% were Italian, 5.0% were Scottish, and 4.7% were American.

Of the 30,204 households, 27.8% had children under the age of 18 living with them, 49.9% were married couples living together, 9.4% had a female householder with no husband present, 36.2% were non-families, and 26.2% of all households were made up of individuals. The average household size was 2.40 and the average family size was 2.88. The median age was 40.7 years.

The county's median household income was $53,828 and the median family income was $65,936. Males had a median income of $46,014 versus $35,864 for females. The county's per capita income was $27,045. About 6.0% of families and 10.0% of the population were below the poverty line, including 10.5% of those under age 18 and 6.8% of those age 65 or over.

=== 2000 census ===
As of the census of 2000, there were 73,825 people, 28,299 households, and 18,790 families living in the county. The population density was 104 people per square mile (40 people/km^{2}). There were 31,876 housing units at an average density of 45 per square mile (17/km^{2}). The county's racial makeup was 97.75% White, 0.37% Black or African American, 0.31% Native American, 0.47% Asian, 0.04% Pacific Islander, 0.18% from other races, and 0.89% from two or more races. 0.72% of the population were Hispanic or Latino of any race. 16.2% were of English, 13.1% French, 12.7% Irish, 9.3% American, 8.7% French Canadian, 6.7% Italian and 6.5% German ancestry. 95.5% spoke English, 1.4% French and 1.2% Spanish as their first language.

There were 28,299 households, of which 30.60% had children under the age of 18 living with them, 53.50% were married couples living together, 9.00% had a female householder with no husband present, and 33.60% were non-families. 25.50% of all households were made up of individuals, and 9.60% had someone living alone who was 65 years of age or older. The average household size was 2.47 and the average family size was 2.96.

23.30% of the county's population were under the age of 18, 11.70% were from 18 to 24, 27.00% were from 25 to 44, 24.30% were from 45 to 64, and 13.70% were 65 years of age or older. The median age was 38 years. For every 100 females there were 94.90 males. For every 100 females age 18 and over, there were 91.70 males.

The county's median household income was $42,382, and the median family income was $51,043. Males had a median income of $33,821 versus $25,328 for females. The county's per capita income was $20,685. About 4.40% of families and 8.00% of the population were below the poverty line, including 8.50% of those under age 18 and 6.30% of those age 65 or over.

== Politics and government ==
United States presidential election results for Cheshire County, New Hampshire
Year	Republican		Democratic		Third party(ies)	
Year	No.	%	No.	%	No.	%
1876	4,162	58.19%	2,984	41.72%	6	0.08%
1880	4,340	58.61%	2,979	40.23%	86	1.16%
1884	3,888	54.34%	2,981	41.66%	286	4.00%
1888	4,118	55.52%	3,165	42.67%	134	1.81%
1892	4,024	56.34%	2,994	41.92%	124	1.74%
1896	4,818	75.60%	1,272	19.96%	283	4.44%
1900	4,435	66.73%	2,120	31.90%	91	1.37%
1904	4,364	66.63%	2,002	30.56%	184	2.81%
1908	4,160	64.74%	1,917	29.83%	349	5.43%
1912	2,765	43.74%	2,114	33.44%	1,442	22.81%
1916	3,337	53.44%	2,779	44.51%	128	2.05%
1920	6,644	65.83%	3,374	33.43%	74	0.73%
1924	7,008	69.00%	2,720	26.78%	428	4.21%
1928	8,673	63.05%	5,025	36.53%	58	0.42%
1932	7,904	57.73%	5,662	41.35%	126	0.92%
1936	8,052	55.25%	6,322	43.38%	200	1.37%
1940	8,302	54.55%	6,916	45.45%	0	0.00%
1944	8,334	54.00%	7,098	45.99%	2	0.01%
1948	9,043	58.32%	6,337	40.87%	126	0.81%
1952	11,897	63.94%	6,710	36.06%	0	0.00%
1956	12,585	69.26%	5,574	30.68%	11	0.06%
1960	11,594	57.22%	8,668	42.78%	0	0.00%
1964	5,958	30.42%	13,626	69.58%	0	0.00%
1968	10,702	52.64%	9,135	44.93%	495	2.43%
1972	13,390	58.98%	9,157	40.33%	156	0.69%
1976	12,554	53.87%	10,388	44.57%	363	1.56%
1980	13,242	52.00%	7,835	30.77%	4,390	17.24%
1984	15,851	63.55%	8,990	36.05%	100	0.40%
1988	15,002	54.53%	12,339	44.85%	171	0.62%
1992	11,037	34.00%	15,037	46.33%	6,383	19.67%
1996	10,252	34.52%	16,159	54.41%	3,290	11.08%
2000	13,793	41.30%	17,382	52.05%	2,220	6.65%
2004	16,463	39.82%	24,438	59.10%	446	1.08%
2008	15,205	35.51%	26,971	62.98%	647	1.51%
2012	15,156	36.64%	25,380	61.36%	824	1.99%
2016	16,876	40.28%	22,064	52.66%	2,955	7.05%
2020	17,898	40.34%	25,522	57.52%	950	2.14%
2024	20,083	44.25%	24,579	54.15%	727	1.60%

=== County Commission ===
The executive power of Cheshire County's government is held by three county commissioners, each representing one of the three commissioner districts within the county.

District	Commissioner	Hometown	Party
1	John Wozmak (chair)	Walpole	Democratic
2	Terry Clark (Clerk)	Keene	Democratic
3	Robert Englund (Vice Chair)	Stoddard	Democratic

In addition to the County Commission, there are five directly elected officials: they include County Attorney, Register of Deeds, County Sheriff, Register of Probate, and County Treasurer.

Office	Name
County Attorney	Chris McLaughlin (D)
Register of Deeds	Anna Tilton (D)
County Sheriff	Eli Rivera (D)
Register of Probate	Jeremy LaPlante (D)
County Treasurer	Charles Weed (D)

=== Legislative branch ===
The legislative branch of Cheshire County is made up of all of the members of the New Hampshire House of Representatives from the county. In total, there are 22 members from 18 different districts. After the 2022 elections, the party distribution and representatives were as follows.

Affiliation	Members	Voting share
Democratic Party	16	72.7%
Republican Party	6	27.3%
Total	23	100%

== Communities ==
=== City ===
- Keene (county seat)

=== Towns ===
- Alstead
- Chesterfield
- Dublin
- Fitzwilliam
- Gilsum
- Harrisville
- Hinsdale
- Jaffrey
- Marlborough
- Marlow
- Nelson
- Richmond
- Rindge
- Roxbury
- Stoddard
- Sullivan
- Surry
- Swanzey
- Troy
- Walpole
- Westmoreland
- Winchester

=== Census-designated places ===
- Hinsdale
- Jaffrey
- Marlborough
- North Walpole
- Troy
- Walpole
- West Swanzey
- Winchester

=== Villages ===
- Ashuelot
- Chesham
- Drewsville
- East Swanzey
- Jaffrey Center
- Munsonville
- Poocham
- Spofford
- West Chesterfield

== See also ==
- National Register of Historic Places listings in Cheshire County, New Hampshire
