= 1944 United States presidential election in New Hampshire =

- November 7, 1944

Nominee	Franklin D. Roosevelt	Thomas E. Dewey
Party	Democratic	Republican
Home state	New York	New York
Running mate	Harry S. Truman	John W. Bricker
Electoral vote	4	0
Popular vote	119,663	109,916
Percentage	52.11%	47.87%

Roosevelt
50–60%
60–70%
70–80%
80–90%
Dewey
50–60%
60–70%
70–80%
80–90%
90–100%
Tie
50%
President before election
Franklin D. Roosevelt
Democratic
Elected President
Franklin D. Roosevelt
Democratic

The 1944 United States presidential election in New Hampshire took place on November 7, as part of the 1944 United States presidential election. State voters chose four electors to the Electoral College, which selected the president and vice president.

New Hampshire was won by the Democratic candidate, incumbent President Franklin D. Roosevelt, who won the state over New York governor Thomas E. Dewey by a narrow margin of 4.24%. A Democrat would not carry New Hampshire again in a presidential election until 1964. This also marks the last time New Hampshire was carried by a different candidate from neighboring Vermont until 2000.

== Results ==
1944 United States presidential election in New Hampshire
Party	Candidate	Running mate	Popular vote		Electoral vote	
Party	Candidate	Running mate	Count	%	Count	%
Democratic	Franklin Delano Roosevelt of New York	Harry S. Truman of Missouri	119,663	52.11%	4	100.00%
Republican	Thomas Edmund Dewey of New York	John William Bricker of Ohio	109,916	47.87%	0	0.00%
Socialist	Norman Thomas of New York	Darlington Hoopes of Pennsylvania	48	0.02%	0	0.00%
Total			229,627	100.00%	4	100.00%

=== Results by county ===
County	Franklin Delano Roosevelt Democratic		Thomas Edmund Dewey Republican		Normas Matton Thomas Socialist		Total votes cast
County	#	%	#	%	#	%	Total votes cast
Belknap	5,325	46.24%	6,188	53.74%	2	0.02%	11,515
Carroll	2,461	31.91%	5,251	68.08%	1	0.01%	7,713
Cheshire	7,098	46.00%	8,334	54.00%	0	0.00%	15,432
Coös	8,709	58.36%	6,209	41.61%	4	0.03%	14,922
Grafton	8,743	44.39%	10,947	55.58%	7	0.04%	19,697
Hillsborough	42,306	62.00%	25,921	37.99%	9	0.01%	68,236
Merrimack	13,382	47.82%	14,599	52.17%	2	0.01%	27,983
Rockingham	13,170	43.44%	17,144	56.55%	2	0.01%	30,316
Strafford	12,497	57.07%	9,388	42.87%	13	0.06%	21,898
Sullivan	5,972	50.13%	5,935	49.82%	6	0.05%	11,913
Totals	119,663	52.11%	109,916	47.87%	46	0.02%	229,625

== See also ==
- United States presidential elections in New Hampshire
