= 1964 United States presidential election in New Hampshire =

- November 3, 1964

Nominee	Lyndon B. Johnson	Barry Goldwater
Party	Democratic	Republican
Home state	Texas	Arizona
Running mate	Hubert Humphrey	William E. Miller
Electoral vote	4	0
Popular vote	184,064	104,029
Percentage	63.89%	36.11%

Johnson
50–60%
60–70%
70–80%
80–90%
Goldwater
50–60%
60–70%
70–80%
90–100%
Tie
40–50%
President before election
Lyndon B. Johnson
Democratic
Elected President
Lyndon B. Johnson
Democratic

The 1964 United States presidential election in New Hampshire took place on November 5, 1964, as part of the 1964 United States presidential election, which was held throughout all 50 states and D.C. Voters chose four representatives, or electors to the Electoral College, who voted for president and vice president.

New Hampshire was won overwhelmingly by the Democratic nominees, incumbent President Lyndon B. Johnson of Texas and his running mate Senator Hubert H. Humphrey of Minnesota. Johnson and Humphrey defeated the Republican nominees, Senator Barry Goldwater of Arizona and his running mate Congressman William E. Miller of New York.

Johnson took 63.89% of the vote to Goldwater's 36.11%, a margin of 27.78%. The staunch conservative Barry Goldwater was widely perceived in the liberal Northeastern United States as a right-wing extremist; he had voted against the Civil Rights Act of 1964, and the Johnson campaign portrayed him as a warmonger who as president would provoke a nuclear war. Thus Goldwater performed especially weakly in liberal northeastern states like New Hampshire, and for the first time in history, a Democratic presidential candidate swept every Northeastern state in 1964. Not only did Johnson win every Northeastern state, but he won all of them with landslides of over 60% of the vote, including New Hampshire. New Hampshire was the only New England state where Goldwater won a county, winning Carroll County.

This would be the last occasion until 2008 that a Democratic presidential nominee would carry Belknap County, and the last until 1996 that the party's nominee would carry Rockingham County (although they would not get a majority there until 2020). New Hampshire as a whole, along with Cheshire, Grafton, Merrimack, and Sullivan Counties, would not vote Democratic again until 1992, after which the state has always gone Democratic except in 2000 when George W. Bush very narrowly won the state over Al Gore.

As Johnson won a decisive nationwide landslide with 61.05% of the vote, normally Republican-leaning New Hampshire's results made the state over 5% more Democratic than the national average in the 1964 election. Only in the 1920 Republican landslide, when the state was James M. Cox’s second-best antebellum free state despite being lost by 20%, has New Hampshire voted more Democratic relative to the nation. As of 2024, this remains the last time that a Democratic presidential nominee would carry New Hampshire by double-digits, as well as the best Democratic presidential performance in New Hampshire history.

== Results ==
1964 United States presidential election in New Hampshire
Party	Candidate	Votes	Percentage	Electoral votes
Democratic	Lyndon B. Johnson (incumbent)	184,064	63.89%	4
Republican	Barry Goldwater	104,029	36.11%	0
Totals		288,093	100.00%	4
Voter Turnout (Voting age/Registered)				72%/79%

=== Results by county ===
County	Lyndon B. Johnson Democratic		Barry Goldwater Republican		Margin		Total votes cast
County	#	%	#	%	#	%	Total votes cast
Belknap	8,024	57.59%	5,908	42.41%	2,116	15.18%	13,932
Carroll	4,058	45.01%	4,957	54.99%	-899	-9.98%	9,015
Cheshire	13,626	69.58%	5,958	30.42%	7,668	39.16%	19,584
Coös	11,956	71.09%	4,863	28.91%	7,093	42.18%	16,819
Grafton	12,566	59.76%	8,461	40.24%	4,105	19.52%	21,027
Hillsborough	60,236	67.12%	29,503	32.88%	30,733	34.24%	89,739
Merrimack	19,818	61.20%	12,564	38.80%	7,254	22.40%	32,382
Rockingham	27,256	58.30%	19,498	41.70%	7,758	16.60%	46,754
Strafford	17,737	68.01%	8,342	31.99%	9,395	36.02%	26,079
Sullivan	8,787	68.85%	3,975	31.15%	4,812	37.70%	12,762
Totals	184,064	63.89%	104,029	36.11%	80,035	27.78%	288,093

==== Counties that flipped from Republican to Democratic ====
- Belknap
- Cheshire
- Grafton
- Merrimack
- Rockingham
- Sullivan

== Analysis ==
Despite the scale of Johnson's statewide win, he did not sweep every county in New Hampshire. Carroll County had long been the most Republican county in New Hampshire, voting over 70% Republican in 1960 and over 80% Republican in 1952 and 1956. In 1964, Carroll County would again be the most Republican county in the state, voting 55–45 for Goldwater even as every other county in the state voted decisively for Johnson. Carroll County was not only the only county carried by Goldwater in New Hampshire, it was the only county Goldwater won in all of New England and the Northeastern United States outside of Pennsylvania. (Note: In Pennsylvania, Goldwater won four counties, only one of which (and that county only once) has ever voted Democratic since Grover Cleveland.) Despite the landslide loss, New Hampshire would prove to be Goldwater's strongest state in the Northeast.

Johnson won the remainder of the state by decisive margins, with his strongest victories in the New Deal Democratic base counties of Hillsborough County, Strafford County, and Coös County, which had long been Democratic counties in an otherwise Republican state, even as the rest of the state finally joined them in voting Democratic in 1964.

Johnson's strongest victory was in rural, French-Canadian Coös County in the far north of the state, which he won with 71.1% of the vote.

== See also ==
- Presidency of Lyndon B. Johnson
- United States presidential elections in New Hampshire
