= 1960 United States presidential election in New Hampshire =

- November 8, 1960

Nominee	Richard Nixon	John F. Kennedy
Party	Republican	Democratic
Home state	California	Massachusetts
Running mate	Henry Cabot Lodge Jr.	Lyndon B. Johnson
Electoral vote	4	0
Popular vote	157,989	137,772
Percentage	53.42%	46.58%

Nixon
50–60%
60–70%
70–80%
80–90%
90–100%
Kennedy
50–60%
60–70%
70–80%
President before election
Dwight D. Eisenhower
Republican
Elected President
John F. Kennedy
Democratic

The 1960 United States presidential election in New Hampshire took place on November 8, 1960, as part of the 1960 United States presidential election, which was held throughout all 50 states. Voters chose four representatives, or electors to the Electoral College, who voted for president and vice president.

New Hampshire was won by the Republican nominees, incumbent Vice President Richard Nixon of California, and his running mate Ambassador Henry Cabot Lodge Jr. of Massachusetts. Nixon and Lodge defeated the Democratic nominees, Senator John F. Kennedy of Massachusetts and his running mate Senate Majority Leader Lyndon B. Johnson of Texas.

Nixon took 53.42% of the vote to Kennedy's 46.58%, a margin of 6.84%. Kennedy swept the entire Northeastern United States, with the exception of the three Upper New England states, although Kennedy was much stronger in New Hampshire and the result was much closer than in neighboring Vermont and Maine. Although the statewide result was close, Nixon won seven of the state's counties while Kennedy won three.

Since Franklin Roosevelt won them in 1932, the counties of Hillsborough County, Strafford County, and Coos County had become reliable New Deal Democratic base counties, voting for Roosevelt all four times as well as for Harry S. Truman. The counties had been won back by the GOP when Dwight Eisenhower swept the state in his nationwide landslide of 1956. However, they reverted to the Democratic Party in 1960, allowing Kennedy to take nearly 47% statewide compared to the 34% Adlai Stevenson had received in the state in 1956.

Kennedy's most substantial victory was in heavily populated Hillsborough County, home to Manchester and Nashua, which went to Kennedy by a decisive 58–42 margin. Carroll County had long been the most Republican county in New Hampshire, voting over eighty percent Republican in 1952 and 1956, and in 1960 it would remain Nixon's strongest county in the region, with Nixon taking over 79% of the vote. As Kennedy narrowly edged out Nixon to win the 1960 election nationally, New Hampshire's results would make the state 7% more Republican than the national average. Nixon would later win New Hampshire again in both 1968 and 1972.

== Primaries ==
Both the Republican and Democratic parties held primaries on March 8.

=== Democratic primary ===
Kennedy had flirted with the New Hampshire primary once before. In 1956 he had briefly considered running as a New England favorite son, with the aim of unifying the state's delegation behind Adlai Stevenson II.

At the start of 1957, Kennedy staffer Ted Sorensen reached out to Bernard L. Boutin (mayor of Laconia, and New Hampshire's representative to the Democratic National Committee) and arranged a meeting between him and Kennedy. Kennedy informed Boutin that he was very seriously exploring a presidential campaign for 1960 and managed to secure his support.

In the following years, money from the Kennedy campaign flowed into the state and Kennedy and his allies continued to visit the state. New Hampshire had a reputation as a state which rewarded campaigning efforts. This meant that Kennedy's status as a native of a neighboring state would not, alone, give him much of an advantage.

In 1958, Kennedy and several members of his family conducted visits to the state. His mother Rose spoke at several colleges and even attended a Concord Bar Mitzvah. His brother Ted gave a speech in rudimentary French to a French-speaking crowd in Suncook. His sisters Eunice, Jean, and Patricia also appeared in the state.

Other potential candidates, such as Lyndon B. Johnson, Stuart Symington, and Hubert Humphrey also made exploratory visits to the state. However, Boutin had established a comprehensive support network for Kennedy in the state which proved strong enough to ward off these candidates.

3 fringe candidates stepped forth to run in the primary. These were Lawrence Daly and country music singer Elton Britt, and ballpoint pen manufacturer Paul Fischer. Boutin managed to successfully challenge the validity of signatures on Daly and Britt's candidature petitions, quickly quashing their candidacies. Paul C. Fisher, who was running on radical tax reform, remained Kennedy's only challenger on the ballot.

Ahead of the primary local Republicans attacked Kennedy, including Governor Wesley Powell, and the New Hampshire Union Leader ran fiercely negative coverage. Nevertheless, Kennedy won handily.

New Hampshire Democratic Presidential Primary Results – 1960
Party	Candidate	Votes	Percentage
Democratic	John F. Kennedy	43,372	85.3%
Democratic	Paul C. Fisher	6,853	13.5%
Democratic	Others	674	1.3%
Totals		50,898	100.00%

=== Republican primary ===
Nixon faced no opponents on the ballot, but several individuals did receive write-in votes.

New Hampshire Republican Presidential Primary Results – 1960
Party	Candidate	Votes	Percentage
Republican	Richard Nixon	65,204	89.3%
Republican	Nelson Rockefeller	2,745	3.8%
Democratic	John F. Kennedy	2,196	3.0%
Republican	Others	2,886	4.0%
Totals		73,031	100.00%

== Results ==
1960 United States presidential election in New Hampshire
Party	Candidate	Votes	Percentage	Electoral votes
Republican	Richard Nixon	157,989	53.42%	4
Democratic	John F. Kennedy	137,772	46.58%	0
Totals		295,761	100.00%	4
Voter Turnout (Voting age/Registered)				79%/84%

=== Results by county ===
County	Richard Nixon Republican		John F. Kennedy Democratic		Margin		Total votes cast
County	#	%	#	%	#	%	Total votes cast
Belknap	9,156	61.92%	5,630	38.08%	3,526	23.84%	14,786
Carroll	7,487	79.61%	1,918	20.39%	5,569	59.22%	9,405
Cheshire	11,594	57.22%	8,668	42.78%	2,926	14.44%	20,262
Coös	7,797	42.72%	10,455	57.28%	-2,658	-14.56%	18,252
Grafton	14,454	64.89%	7,821	35.11%	6,633	29.78%	22,275
Hillsborough	38,430	42.43%	52,135	57.57%	-13,705	-15.14%	90,565
Merrimack	20,395	60.57%	13,278	39.43%	7,117	21.14%	33,673
Rockingham	28,032	62.16%	17,063	37.84%	10,969	24.32%	45,095
Strafford	13,539	48.57%	14,335	51.43%	-796	-2.86%	27,874
Sullivan	7,105	52.34%	6,469	47.66%	636	4.68%	13,574
Totals	157,989	53.42%	137,772	46.58%	20,217	6.84%	295,761

==== Counties that flipped from Republican to Democratic ====
- Coös
- Hillsborough
- Strafford

== See also ==
- Presidency of John F. Kennedy
- Presidency of Lyndon B. Johnson
- United States presidential elections in New Hampshire
