= 2000 United States presidential election in New Hampshire =

- November 7, 2000

Nominee	George W. Bush	Al Gore
Party	Republican	Democratic
Home state	Texas	Tennessee
Running mate	Dick Cheney	Joe Lieberman
Electoral vote	4	0
Popular vote	273,559	266,348
Percentage	48.07%	46.80%

Bush
40–50%
50–60%
60–70%
70–80%
80–90%
90–100%
Gore
40–50%
50–60%
60–70%
No data
President before election
Bill Clinton
Democratic
Elected President
George W. Bush
Republican

The 2000 United States presidential election in New Hampshire took place on election day on November 7, as part of the 2000 United States presidential election. The two major candidates were Texas Governor George W. Bush of the Republican Party and Vice President Al Gore of the Democratic Party. When all votes were tallied, Bush was declared the winner with a plurality of the vote over Gore, receiving 48% of the vote to Gore's 47%, while Green Party candidate Ralph Nader received almost 4% of the vote in the state. Bush went on to win the election nationwide. Had Gore come out victorious in New Hampshire with its four electoral votes, he would have won the presidency, regardless of the outcome of Bush v. Gore.

Through the 2024 election, 2000 marks the only time since 1988 that the Republican nominee won New Hampshire. New Hampshire is the only state to vote for the Republican ticket in 2000 to have not done so again. Every other state Bush won in 2000 voted for him again in 2004.

The 2000 election was the last time that a Republican won any electoral votes in New England until Donald Trump won Maine's 2nd congressional district in 2016, and the last time a Republican won any state in the Northeastern United States until Trump won Pennsylvania in 2016.

In 2000, Bush was the first Republican since 1888 to carry the state without Merrimack County, the first since 1880 to win without Grafton County, and the first to win without Cheshire County.

== General election ==
=== Polling ===
Poll source	Date(s)	Sample size	Margin of error	George W. Bush (R)	Al Gore (D)	Ralph Nader (G)	Other / undecided (Note: Calculated by taking the difference of 100% and all other listed candidates combined. For polls that do not report a figure for Nader, this includes his support.)
American Research Group	November 3, 2000	600	—	48%	38%	9%	5%
Harris Insights & Analytics	November 3, 2000	1,400	—	45%	47%	7%	1%
University of New Hampshire Survey Center	November 3, 2000	801	—	45%	39%	5%	11%
American Research Group	November 1, 2000	600	—	45%	40%	5%	10%
RKM Research and Communications Inc.	October 31, 2000	487	—	42%	43%	3%	12%
Research 2000	October 31, 2000	600	—	42%	46%	2%	10%
Franklin Pierce University Marlin Fitzwater Center for Communication	October 24, 2000	885 (RV)	—	40%	43%	5%	12%
Rasmussen Reports	October 22, 2000	1,338	—	46%	38%	—	16%
Research 2000	October 17, 2000	603	—	41%	44%	1%	14%

=== Results ===
2000 United States presidential election in New Hampshire
Party	Candidate	Running mate	Votes	Percentage	Electoral votes
Republican	George Bush	Dick Cheney	273,559	48.07%	4
Democratic	Al Gore	Joe Lieberman	266,348	46.80%	0
Green	Ralph Nader	Winona LaDuke	22,198	3.70%	0
Libertarian	Harry Browne	Art Olivier	2,757	0.48%	0
Independent	Pat Buchanan	Ezola Foster	2,615	0.46%	0
Write-ins	Various candidates	—	1,276 (Note: 775 of these write-in votes were for John McCain and 55 for Natural Law Party candidate John Hagelin, and were not separated by county.)	0.23%	0
Constitution	Howard Phillips	J. Curtis Frazier	328	0.06%	0
Totals			569,081	100.00%	4
Voter turnout (Voting age/Registered)					61%/67%

==== Results by county ====
County	George W. Bush Republican		Al Gore Democratic		Various candidates Other parties		Margin		Total votes cast
County	#	%	#	%	#	%	#	%	Total votes cast
Belknap	14,799	55.23%	10,719	40.00%	1,277	4.77%	4,080	15.23%	26,795
Carroll	12,597	52.75%	9,852	41.26%	1,430	5.99%	2,745	11.49%	23,879
Cheshire	13,793	41.30%	17,382	52.05%	2,220	6.65%	-3,589	-10.75%	33,395
Coös	7,329	50.20%	6,570	45.00%	701	4.80%	759	5.20%	14,600
Grafton	18,092	46.71%	18,326	47.31%	2,315	5.98%	-234	-0.60%	38,733
Hillsborough	80,649	48.65%	77,625	46.83%	7,487	4.52%	3,024	1.82%	165,761
Merrimack	30,028	47.15%	30,622	48.08%	3,034	4.77%	-594	-0.93%	63,684
Rockingham	65,860	49.09%	61,628	45.93%	6,685	4.98%	4,232	3.16%	134,173
Strafford	21,108	42.73%	25,400	51.42%	2,885	5.85%	-4,292	-8.69%	49,393
Sullivan	9,304	49.84%	8,224	44.05%	1,140	6.11%	1,080	5.79%	18,668
Totals	273,559	48.07%	266,348	46.80%	29,174	5.13%	7,211	1.27%	569,081

Counties flipped from Democratic to Republican

- Coös (largest city: Berlin)
- Hillsborough (largest city: Manchester)
- Rockingham (largest municipality: Derry)
- Sullivan (largest city: Claremont)

==== By congressional district ====
Bush and Gore both won a congressional district. Gore won a district held by a Republican.

District	Gore	Bush	Representative
1st	46%	49%	John E. Sununu
2nd	48%	47%	Charles Bass

== Analysis ==
In 2000, New Hampshire was considered a swing state. While it had voted Republican in every election from 1948 through 1988 except for 1964, Democrat Bill Clinton won the state twice in the 1990s (1992 and 1996), and polling indicated that the state would be a toss-up in 2000. New Hampshire would play a pivotal role in the outcome of the 2000 presidential election as George W. Bush defeated Al Gore in New Hampshire by a narrow 1.27% (or a raw-vote margin of 7,211 votes), in the midst of one of the closest elections in US history. Had Gore won the state, New Hampshire's electoral college votes would have swung the national election in his favor. This election was the first and only time since 1944 that New Hampshire voted for a different candidate than neighboring Vermont, the only time ever that New Hampshire voted Republican while Vermont voted Democratic, and the only time since 1968 that New Hampshire voted differently than neighboring Maine. As of 2024, this is the most recent election in which a Republican presidential candidate has carried a state in New England, although Donald Trump would later win a single electoral vote from Maine in 2016, 2020 and 2024.

Still, New Hampshire has continued to be regarded as a competitive state. Beginning in 1972, it has consistently voted to the right of any other state in New England, and the Democratic margins of victory stayed within single digits in every election following 2000, including a razor-thin 0.4% victory, or 2,736 votes, by Hillary Clinton in 2016, with the same county map as in 2000. In 2020, Joe Biden carried New Hampshire by a fairly comfortable 7.35%, prompting some to wonder whether it was losing its battleground-state status. In 2024, Kamala Harris won the state by 2.8%, the closest margin of victory of any state she won that year, though Harris still won a majority of the vote in the state.

== Electors ==
Although voters select or write in their preferred candidate on a ballot, voters in New Hampshire, as in all 50 states and the District of Columbia, technically cast their ballots for electors: representatives to the Electoral College. Since New Hampshire is represented by two congressional districts and two senators, it is allocated four electoral votes. All candidates who appear on the ballot or qualify to receive write-in votes must submit a list of four electors, who pledge to vote for their candidate and their running mate. Whichever candidate wins the most votes in the state is awarded all four electoral votes. Their chosen electors then vote for president and vice president. Although electors are pledged to their candidate and running mate, they are not obligated to vote for them. An elector who votes for someone other than their candidate is known as a faithless elector. The electors of each state and the District of Columbia met on December 18, 2000, to cast their votes for president and vice president. The Electoral College itself never meets as one body. Instead, the electors from each state and the District of Columbia met in their respective capitols. The following were the members of the Electoral College from the state. All were pledged to and voted for Bush and Cheney:

- Stephen Duprey
- Wayne MacDonald
- Augusta Petrone
- Irusha Peiris

== See also ==
- Presidency of George W. Bush
- United States presidential elections in New Hampshire
