= 1992 United States presidential election in New Hampshire =

- November 3, 1992

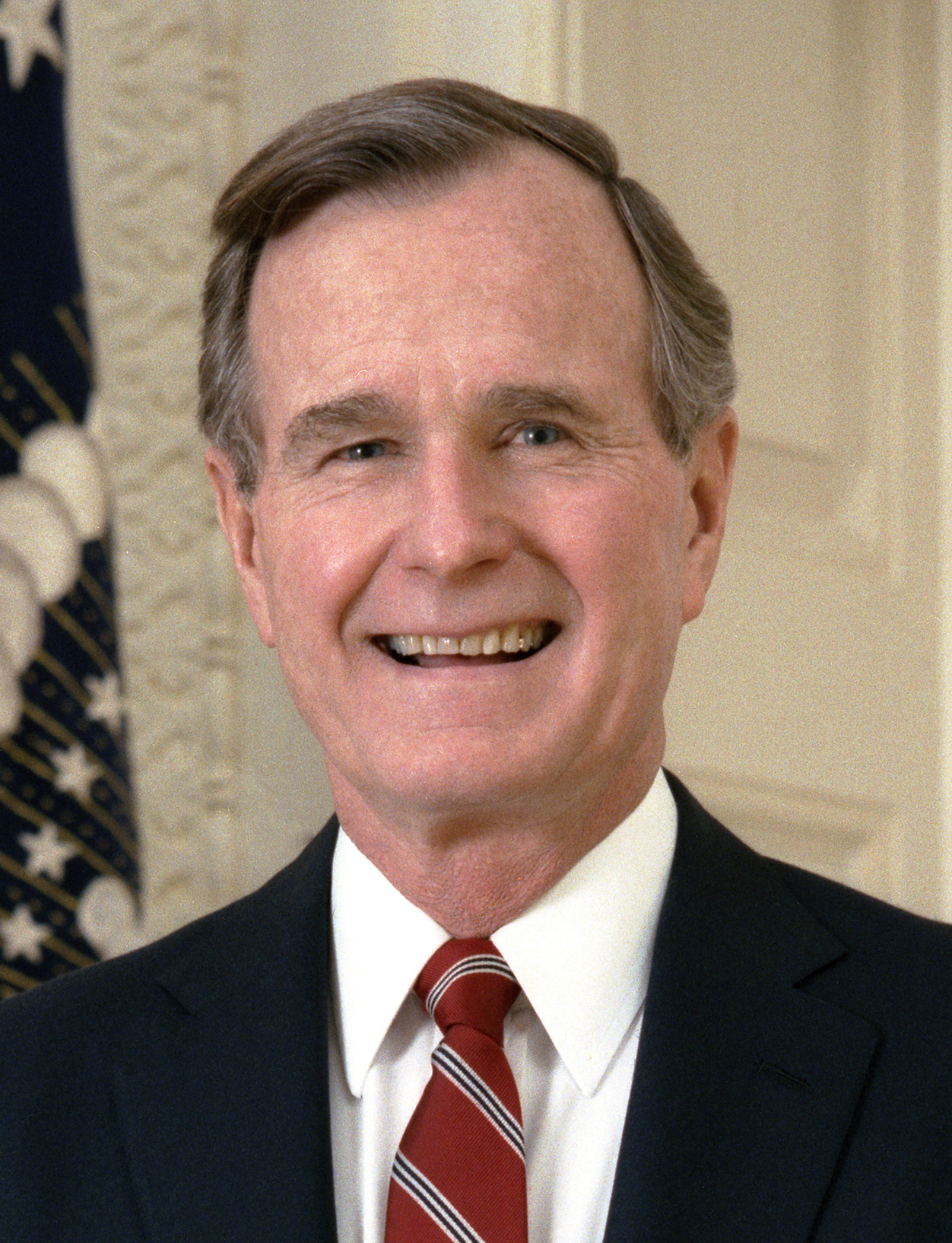

Nominee	Bill Clinton	George H. W. Bush	Ross Perot
Party	Democratic	Republican	Independent
Home state	Arkansas	Texas	Texas
Running mate	Al Gore	Dan Quayle	James Stockdale
Electoral vote	4	0	0
Popular vote	209,040	202,484	121,337
Percentage	38.91%	37.69%	22.59%

Clinton
30–40%
40–50%
50–60%
60–70%
90–100%
Bush
30–40%
40–50%
50–60%
60–70%
Perot
30–40%
40–50%
50–60%
70–80%
President before election
George H. W. Bush
Republican
Elected President
Bill Clinton
Democratic

The 1992 United States presidential election in New Hampshire took place on November 3, 1992, as part of the 1992 United States presidential election. Voters chose four representatives, or electors to the Electoral College, who voted for president and vice president.

New Hampshire was won by Governor Bill Clinton (D-Arkansas) with 38.91% of the popular vote over incumbent President George H. W. Bush (R-Texas) with 37.69%. Businessman Ross Perot (I-Texas) finished in third, with 22.59% of the popular vote. Clinton ultimately won the national vote, defeating incumbent President Bush. This was the best result the New England-born Bush would record in that region for the 1992 election.

Clinton's win marked the beginning of a dramatic shift in New Hampshire politics toward the Democratic Party. The state had been regarded as a Republican bastion, having previously voted Republican in every presidential election starting in 1948 except for Lyndon B. Johnson's 1964 landslide. In 1988 Bush carried the state by over 26 points, making it his second-best state in that election. Nevertheless, like the rest of New England, New Hampshire began trending hard toward the Democratic Party in the 1990s, and starting in 1992 the state has voted Democratic in every presidential election except 2000 when Bush's son eked out a narrow plurality over Clinton's vice president, Al Gore. This marked the first presidential election since 1912 in which a non-incumbent Democrat carried New Hampshire.

== Primaries ==
- 1992 New Hampshire Democratic presidential primary
- 1992 New Hampshire Republican presidential primary

== Results ==
1992 United States presidential election in New Hampshire
Party	Candidate	Votes	Percentage	Electoral votes
Democratic	Bill Clinton	209,040	38.91%	4
Republican	George H. W. Bush (incumbent)	202,484	37.69%	0
Independent	Ross Perot	121,337	22.59%	0
Libertarian	Andre Marrou	3,548	0.66%	0
New Alliance	Lenora Fulani	512	0.10%	0
Natural Law	Dr. John Hagelin	294	0.05%	0
Totals		537,215	100.0%	4

=== Results by county ===
County	Bill Clinton Democratic		George H.W. Bush Republican		Ross Perot Independent		Andre Marrou Libertarian		Various candidates Other parties		Margin		Total votes cast
County	#	%	#	%	#	%	#	%	#	%	#	%	Total votes cast
Belknap	8,405	33.50%	10,578	42.16%	5,970	23.79%	110	0.44%	27	0.11%	-2,173	-8.66%	25,090
Carroll	7,258	33.44%	8,715	40.16%	5,546	25.55%	134	0.62%	50	0.23%	-1,457	-6.72%	21,703
Cheshire	15,037	46.33%	11,037	34.00%	6,195	19.09%	156	0.48%	32	0.10%	4,000	12.33%	32,457
Coös	6,559	41.50%	5,271	33.35%	3,868	24.47%	75	0.47%	31	0.20%	1,288	8.15%	15,804
Grafton	15,389	42.34%	13,450	37.01%	7,296	20.08%	151	0.42%	57	0.16%	1,939	5.33%	36,343
Hillsborough	58,470	37.04%	61,620	39.04%	36,067	22.85%	1,329	0.84%	354	0.22%	-3,150	-2.00%	157,840
Merrimack	24,437	41.54%	22,114	37.59%	11,860	20.16%	365	0.62%	58	0.10%	2,323	3.95%	58,834
Rockingham	44,317	35.80%	47,353	38.25%	31,192	25.19%	802	0.65%	142	0.11%	-3,036	-2.45%	123,806
Strafford	21,247	44.69%	16,028	33.72%	9,920	20.87%	306	0.64%	38	0.08%	5,219	10.97%	47,539
Sullivan	7,921	44.50%	6,318	35.50%	3,423	19.23%	120	0.67%	17	0.10%	1,603	9.00%	17,799
Totals	209,040	38.86%	202,484	37.64%	121,337	22.56%	3,548	0.66%	1,536	0.29%	6,556	1.22%	537,945

==== Counties that flipped from Republican to Democratic ====
- Cheshire
- Coös
- Grafton
- Merrimack
- Strafford
- Sullivan

== See also ==
- Presidency of Bill Clinton
- United States presidential elections in New Hampshire
