= Hanover (CDP), New Hampshire =

Census-designated place in New Hampshire, United States

Hanover, New Hampshire
- Census-designated place
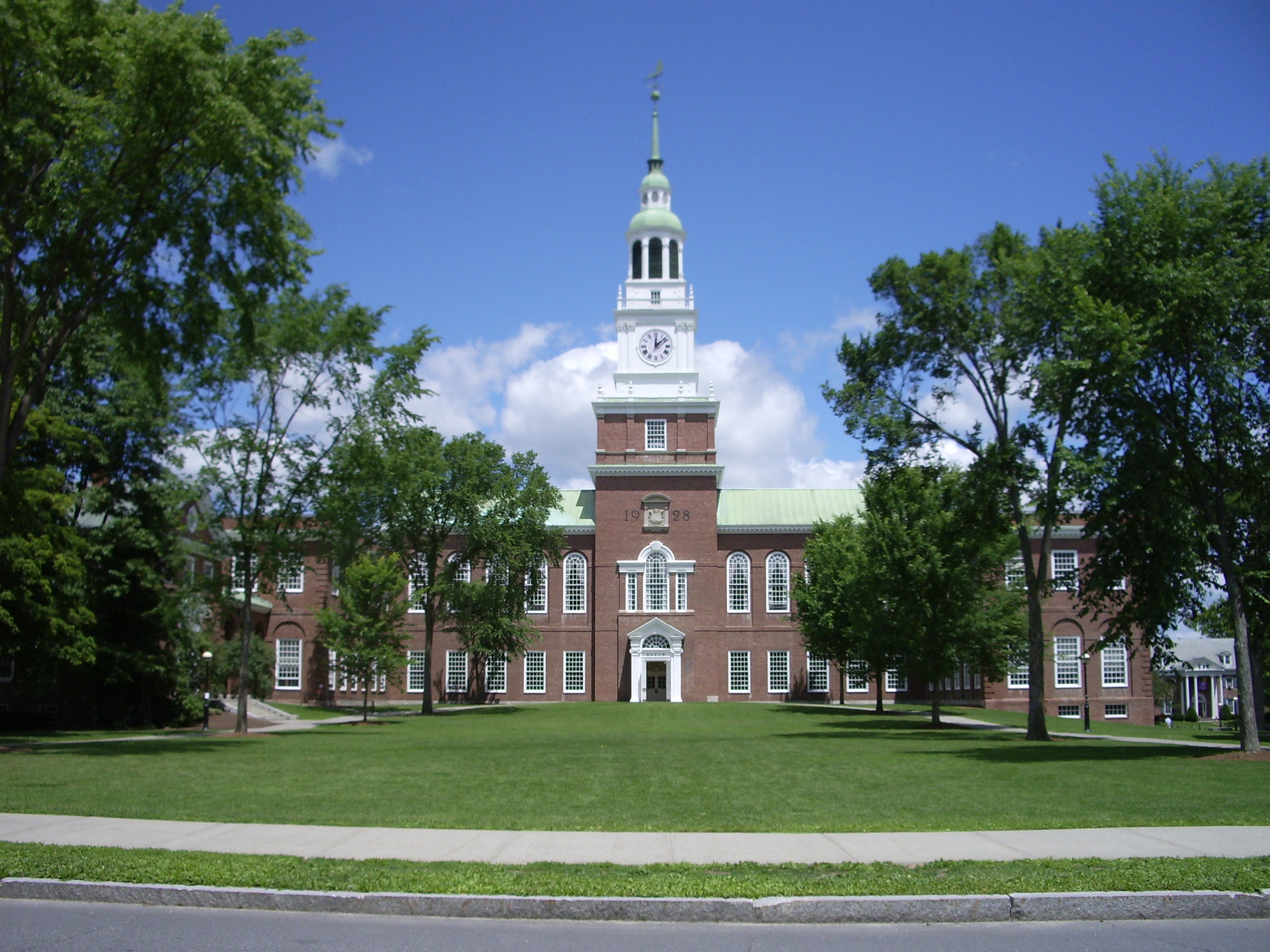
- Baker Memorial Library of Dartmouth College

- Location within New Hampshire Location within the United States
- Coordinates: 43°42′08″N 72°17′22″W
- Country: United States
- State: New Hampshire
- County: Grafton
- Town: Hanover

Area
  - Total: 4.91 sq mi (12.71 km^{2})
  - Land: 4.52 sq mi (11.71 km^{2})
  - Water: 0.38 sq mi (0.99 km^{2})
- Elevation: 459 ft (140 m)

Population (2020)
  - Total: 9,078
  - Density: 2,007.5/sq mi (775.11/km^{2})
- Time zone: UTC-5 (Eastern (EST))
  - Summer (DST): UTC-4 (EDT)
- ZIP code: 03755
- Area code: 603
- FIPS code: 33-33780
- GNIS feature ID: 2378069

Hanover is a census-designated place (CDP) and the main village in the town of Hanover, New Hampshire, United States. The population of the CDP was 9,078 at the 2020 census, out of 11,870 in the entire town. The CDP includes the campus of Dartmouth College.

== Geography ==
The CDP is in the southwestern corner of the town of Hanover, bordered to the south by the city of Lebanon and to the west by the Connecticut River, which forms the New Hampshire–Vermont boundary. To the north the CDP extends upriver as far as the outlet of Storrs Pond. The eastern border of the CDP follows the outlet brook upstream to Storrs Pond, then continues up Camp Brook and Reservoir Road to Grasse Road at the outlet of the Lower Hanover Reservoir. The eastern border continues south on Grasse Road, then west on Wheelock Street to a line east of Low Road. The CDP border runs over Velvet Rocks and down an unnamed brook to Mink Brook, then west to New Hampshire Route 120, which it follows south to the Lebanon city line.

New Hampshire Route 10 passes through the center of Hanover, leading north 10 miles (16 km) to Lyme and south 4 miles (6 km) to West Lebanon. Route 10A (West Wheelock Street) leaves Route 10 at the town center and leads west across Ledyard Bridge 1 mile (1.6 km) to Interstate 91 in Norwich, Vermont. New Hampshire Route 120 leads southeast from Hanover 5 miles (8 km) to Interstate 89 and 6 miles (10 km) to the center of Lebanon.

According to the U.S. Census Bureau, the Hanover CDP has a total area of 4.9 square miles (12.7 km^{2}), of which 4.5 square miles (11.7 km^{2}) are land and 0.4 square miles (1.0 km^{2}), or 7.83%, are water.

== Demographics ==
Historical population
Census	Pop.	Note	%±
1950	4,999		—
1960	5,649		13.0%
1970	6,147		8.8%
1980	6,861		11.6%
1990	6,538		−4.7%
2000	8,162		24.8%
2010	8,636		5.8%
2020	9,078		5.1%
U.S. Decennial Census

The population of the Hanover CDP is strongly influenced by the presence of Dartmouth students living in dormitories and in off-campus housing. As of the census of 2010, there were 8,636 people, 2,095 households, and 1,016 families residing in the CDP. There were 2,276 housing units, of which 181, or 8.0%, were vacant. The racial makeup of the CDP was 77.5% white, 4.3% African American, 1.0% Native American, 12.4% Asian, 0.02% Pacific Islander, 0.9% some other race, and 3.9% from two or more races. 4.6% of the population were Hispanic or Latino of any race.

Of the 2,095 households in the CDP, 23.6% had children under the age of 18 living with them, 43.4% were headed by married couples living together, 4.0% had a female householder with no husband present, and 51.5% were non-families. 36.6% of all households were made up of individuals, and 20.6% were someone living alone who was 65 years of age or older. The average household size was 2.28, and the average family size was 2.96. 3,861 people in the CDP lived in group quarters, including dormitories or nursing homes, rather than households.

10.9% of residents in the CDP were under the age of 18, 49.6% were from age 18 to 24, 14.2% were from 25 to 44, 12.2% were from 45 to 64, and 13.2% were 65 years of age or older. The median age was 22.1 years. For every 100 females, there were 96.6 males. For every 100 females age 18 and over, there were 95.6 males.

For the period 2011–15, the estimated median annual income for a household was $88,164, and the median income for a family was $156,776. Male full-time workers had a median income of $81,667 versus $52,111 for females. The per capita income for the CDP was $30,497. 18.4% of the population and 7.6% of families were below the poverty line, along with 14.3% of people under the age of 18 and 7.4% of people 65 or older.
