= Donald Kreider =

American mathematician and educator

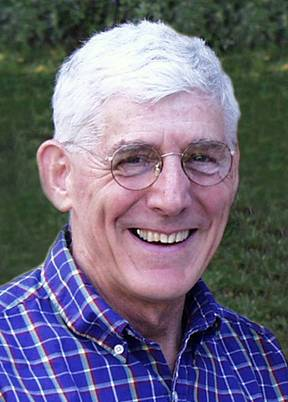
- Donald Kreider (1931-2006)
- Born: December 5, 1931; Lancaster, Pennsylvania
- Died: December 7, 2006 (aged 75); Sugar Hill, New Hampshire
- Education: Lebanon Valley College; Massachusetts Institute of Technology
- Known for: President, Mathematical Association of America, 1993–1994
- Scientific career
- Thesis: Analytic Predicates and Extensions of the Notion of Constructive Ordinal (1959)
- Doctoral advisor: Hartley Rogers Jr.

Donald Lester Kreider (December 5, 1931 – December 7, 2006) was an American mathematician and educator who served as president of the Mathematical Association of America (1993–1994).

== Early life ==
Kreider was born on December 5, 1931, in Lancaster, Pennsylvania. He attended high school in Lititz, Pennsylvania, and college at Lebanon Valley College, where he received a bachelor's degree in 1953. In 1959, he received a PhD in mathematics from the Massachusetts Institute of Technology for a thesis in recursive function theory supervised by Hartley Rogers.

== Career ==
Kreider spent a postdoctoral year at MIT before joining the Department of Mathematics at Dartmouth College in 1960. At both MIT and Dartmouth, Kreider was known for excellent teaching. His advisor Hartley Rogers at MIT commented that "he had a graduate student [who] was an extraordinary teacher [and] won the Goodwin Medal for teaching at MIT". John Kemeny at Dartmouth remarked that it was difficult to find faculty who could teach well at both the undergraduate and graduate levels, but that "occasionally you are lucky—Don Kreider is an example. Don is spectacular at anything he teaches."

Initially, Kreider continued research and writing in recursive function theory, working with Robert W. Ritchie. But he increasingly turned his attention to mathematical pedagogy, writing textbooks in recursive function theory, differential equations, and linear analysis with colleagues in the Department of Mathematics.

Starting in 1960, Kreider became active in the Committee on the Undergraduate Program in Mathematics (CUPM) at the Mathematical Association of America (MAA), where he later led the Subpanel on Calculus and received one of the first grants in the Calculus Initiative launched by the National Science Foundation in 1989.

Kreider had a long-standing interest in the use of computation in teaching calculus. Working with John Kemeny and Thomas E. Kurtz, he developed programs that provided automatic feedback to students about four programs in Dartmouth Basic that they were assigned to write in freshman mathematics courses taken by 80% of all Dartmouth students. Later he was lead author of a book supporting the use of the HP-48G/GX calculator and co-author with his colleague Dwight Lahr of an interactive set of teaching modules.

Also in the 1960s, Kreider chaired the school board in Norwich, Vermont and was instrumental in forming the Dresden School District, the first inter-state school district in the United States, between Norwich and Hanover, New Hampshire. He spent three summers with the Entebbe Project in Africa, where he worked with local teachers on a high school mathematics curriculum, textbooks, and teacher training materials.

In the 1970s, Kreider chaired the College Board Calculus Development Committee and was a member of its Mathematical Science Advisory Committee, where he promoted the development of an Advanced Placement course in computer science.

At Dartmouth, Kreider had a particularly close relationship with John Kemeny. In 1967, he succeeded Kemeny as Chairman of the Department of Mathematics, which Kemeny had chaired since 1954. From 1972 to 1975, he was Vice President and Dean for Student Affairs. John Kemeny, who had become President of Dartmouth in 1970, sought help from Kreider and Ruth Adams, a former President of Wellesley College, in managing the expansion of Dartmouth College as it began admitting women as well as significant numbers of Native American and minority students. A key factor in the expansion was the Dartmouth Plan, under which Dartmouth went to year-round operation to accommodate a larger student body without having to admit fewer men. And a key factor in the Dartmouth Plan was Project FIND (Forecasting Institutional Needs at Dartmouth), for which Kreider chaired the coordinating committee, that created an information management information system on the Dartmouth Time-Sharing System and integrated it with all planning aspects of the College.

After returning to the Dartmouth Mathematics Department in 1975, Kreider served another term as its chairman and became increasing active in the Mathematical Association of America. He served as its treasurer from 1986 to 1992 when, according to his successor Gerald J. Porter, "the MAA made remarkable strides toward putting both its financial and physical houses in order." He also served as the MAA president-elect (1992), as its president (1993–1994), and on its Board of Governors (1995–1999).

Kreider retired from Dartmouth in 1997. He died on December 7, 2006, at the age of 75.

== Selected publications ==
- Donald L. Kreider, Robert G. Kuller, Donald R. Ostberg, and Fred W. Perkins, An Introduction to Linear Analysis, Addison-Wesley Series in Mathematics, 1966. ISBN 020103946X
- Donald Kreider, Dwight Lahr, and Susan Diesel, Principles of Calculus Modeling, An Interactive Approach, Department of Mathematics, Dartmouth College
- D. L. Kreider and R. W. Ritchie, "Predictably computable functionals and definition by recursion," Zeitschrift fur mathematische Logik und Grundlagen der Mathematik 10:5, 1964, pages 65–80
- Donald L. Kreider & Hartley Rogers, Jr., "Constructive versions of ordinal number classes", Transactions of the American Mathematical Society 100:2, August 1961), pages 325 369
- Donald L. Kreider, Robert G. Kuller, and Donald R. Ostberg, Elementary Differential Equations, Addison-Wesley Publishing Company, 1968. ISBN 0201039516
- Donald R. Latorre, Donald L. Kreider, T. G. Proctor, HP-48G/GX Investigations in Mathematics, Charles River Media, 1996. ISBN 1886801231
