= NH 120 =

NH 120 may refer to:

- National Highway 120 (India)
- New Hampshire Route 120, United States
