= Lewiston, Vermont =

Former village in Vermont, U.S.

Lewiston is a former village in the town of Norwich, Windsor County, Vermont, United States. Settlers first arrived in that area in 1765; the village's namesake, Dr. Joseph Lewis, arrived two years later. From the late 19th century, the village was centered on a rail station that was used by both Norwich and the town directly across the Connecticut River, Hanover, New Hampshire.

Because of the rail station, built in 1884, Lewiston became important to surrounding towns on both sides of the Connecticut River and to Dartmouth College in Hanover. The coal that Dartmouth used to heat its buildings came through this station. By the 1920s, however, the economic importance of Lewiston to the neighboring regions decreased. Dartmouth began using oil instead of coal, and all the mills in Lewiston were gone by 1930. The railroad remains today, though the station is not used for its original purpose.

In 1950, lower-lying farm areas were flooded when the Wilder Dam was constructed downstream. In 1967, almost all of Lewiston was razed to make way for Interstate 91 and its access road from Hanover. The railroad, a Dartmouth College-owned pottery studio (in the house once owned by Dr. Joseph Lewis), and a small road off McKenna Road, Lewiston Hill Road, make up some of the area where the center of the village of Lewiston was situated. Many of the buildings in that area are now owned by Dartmouth.

Lewiston is located at 43°42′14″N 72°18′2″W, and its elevation is 387 feet.
