= Beaver Meadow School =

- U.S. National Register of Historic Places
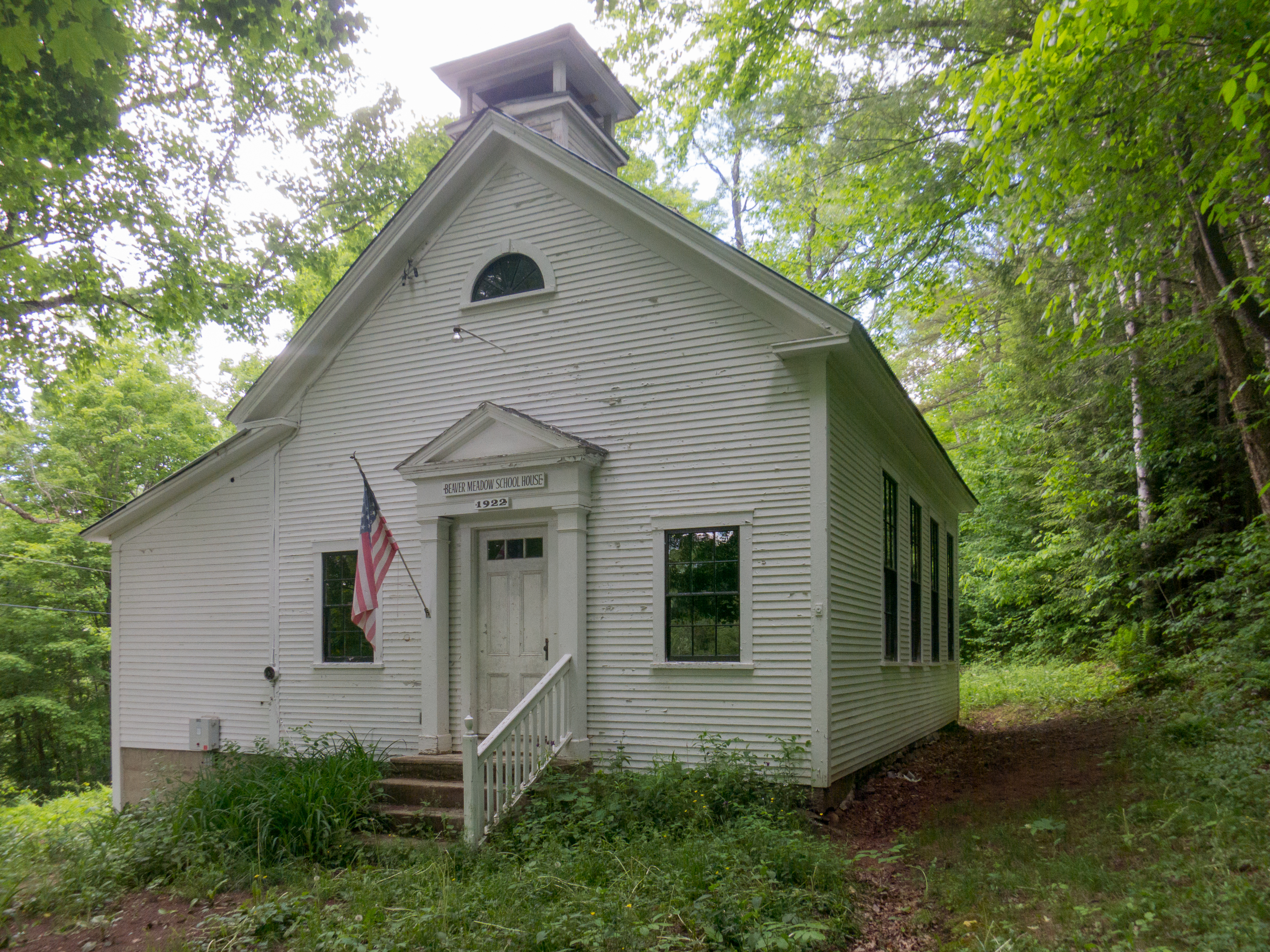
- Front view

- Location within Vermont Location within the United States
- Location: 246 Chapel Hill Rd., Norwich, Vermont
- Coordinates: 43°45′50″N 72°22′19″W
- Area: less than one acre
- Built: 1922
- Architectural style: Colonial Revival
- NRHP reference No.: 13000374
- Added to NRHP: June 7, 2013

The Beaver Meadow School is a historic school building at 246 Chapel Hill Road in Norwich, Vermont. Built in 1922, it is a rare late example of a one-room schoolhouse, made further distinctive by the survival of its original schoolroom interior. The building was listed on the National Register of Historic Places in 2013.

== Description and history ==
The Beaver Meadow School stands in the rural crossroads village of West Norwich, on the east side of Chapel Hill Road, a short way north of its junction with Beaver Meadow Road. It is a single-story wood-frame structure, with a gabled roof, clapboard siding, and a foundation of stone and concrete. Shed-roof additions extend across the full length of the western side, and part of the northern side. The building faces south, facing a gravel parking lot near the road. The facade has sash windows on either side of its entrance, which is handsomely decorated with flanking engaged Tuscan columns rising to an entablature and gabled pediment. A semicircular window is set in the gable end above. The roof is topped by a square, square open belfry. The interior has a narrow vestibule, which opens into the main chamber. It has a stage at one end, and retains original wood flooring, wainscoting, and a woodstove with an unusual safety enclosure.

The school was built in 1922, a fairly late period for the construction of these types of district school buildings. It was used until 1946 for educational purposes, and has been used since then as a community clubhouse. It is unusual among one-room schoolhouses for retaining most of its original interior, which is often lost when such buildings are converted to other uses. This school, along with the Root School, was among the last of the town's district schools to close.

== See also ==
- National Register of Historic Places listings in Windsor County, Vermont
