= Goodrich Four Corners Historic District =

Historic district in Vermont, United States

- U.S. National Register of Historic Places
- U.S. Historic district
- Location within Vermont Location within the United States
- Location: 929-987 Union Village, 18 Pattrell & 694 Goodrich Four Corners Rds., Norwich, Vermont
- Coordinates: 43°45′19″N 72°16′43″W
- Area: 232 acres (94 ha)
- Architectural style: Colonial Revival, Federal
- NRHP reference No.: 100004111
- Added to NRHP: June 26, 2019

The Goodrich Four Corners Historic District encompasses a rural 19th-century village center in rural northern Norwich, Vermont. The village arose in the late 18th century, settled by the son of one of Norwich's early proprietors. The district has well-preserved examples of architecture ranging from the late 18th century to the early 20th century. It was listed on the National Register of Historic Places in 2019.

== Description and history ==
The town of Norwich was chartered in 1761 and settled the following decade. One of its first permanent residents was John Slafter, the son of proprietor and Connecticut native Samuel Slafter, who arrived in 1763. He removed from the early town center to settle the area known as Goodrich Four Corners in the 1780s. Three of the farmhouses surviving in the district were built by Slafter and other early settlers. Subsistence farming was more successful in this area than it had been in the Connecticut River valley, and the settlement flourished in the 19th century as a small farming community. Farms were primarily focused on wool production until the late 19th century, when a decline in demand prompted a shift to dairy production. Around the turn of the 20th century, one of the original farms was taken over by the Goodrich family, which lends its name to the district.

The district covers 232 acres (94 ha), roughly centered at the four-way junction of Union Village Road, Goodrich Four Corners Road, and Pattell Road, the latter two forming a roughly north-south axis paralleling a local stream. Four farmhouses, three of which date to the 18th century, are scattered along these roadways, surround by typically 19th and early 20th-century outbuildings. The only non-agricultural building in the district is the 1937 Root School, a late example of a one-room schoolhouse which is also individually listed on the National Register.

== See also ==
- National Register of Historic Places listings in Windsor County, Vermont
