= New Hampshire Route 10 =

North-south state highway in New Hampshire, US

New Hampshire Route 10
- Map of New Hampshire with NH 10 highlighted in red (this includes the section cosigned along US 302)

Route information
- Maintained by NHDOT
- Length: 122.476 mi (197.106 km)
- Existed: 1922–present

Major junctions
- South end: Route 10 in Northfield, MA
- NH 9 / NH 12 / NH 101 in Keene; I-89 / US 4 in Lebanon
- North end: US 302 in Haverhill

Location
- Country: United States
- State: New Hampshire
- Counties: Cheshire, Sullivan, Grafton

Highway system
- New Hampshire Highway System; Interstate; US; State; Turnpikes
← NH 9A	→ NH 10A
← Route 9	N.E.	→ Route 11

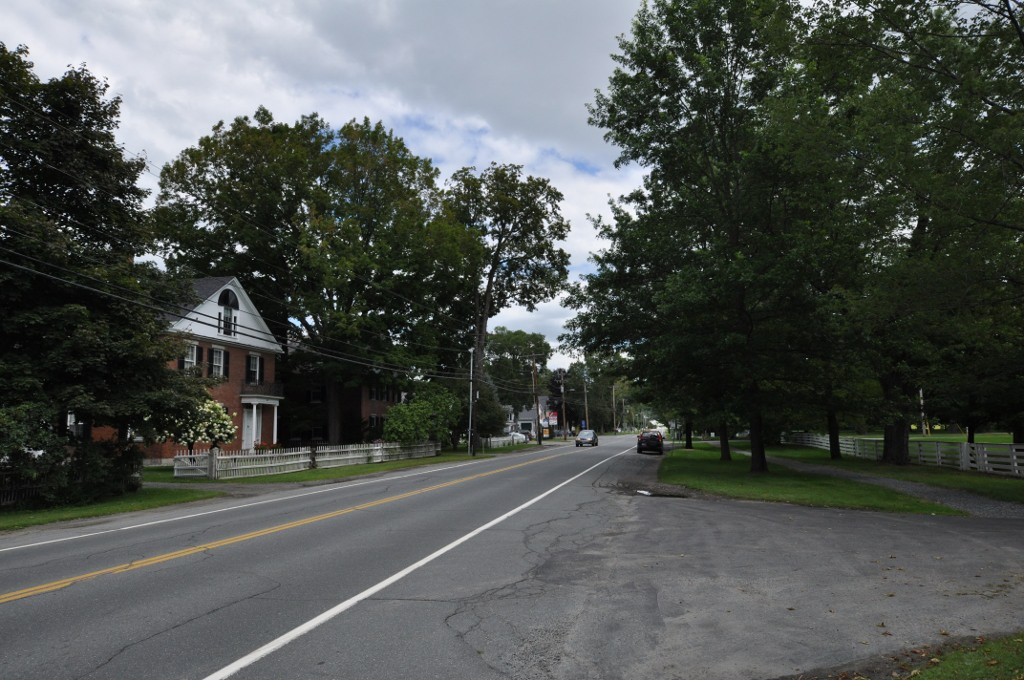
Orford Street Historic District, part of Route 10 in Orford

New Hampshire Route 10 is a 122.25-mile-long (196.74 km) north–south state highway in western New Hampshire, United States. Its southern terminus is in Winchester at the Massachusetts state line, where it continues south as Massachusetts Route 10. Administratively, the northern terminus is at a junction with U.S. Route 302 in Haverhill.

In the field, however, NH 10 is cosigned along US 302 for an additional 19.8 miles (31.9 km) from Haverhill to an intersection with New Hampshire Route 18 in Littleton. However, this is not officially part of the route.

NH 10 is a multi-state route along with Massachusetts Route 10 and Connecticut Route 10. Its number is derived from its original 1922 designation as New England Interstate Route 10.

== Route description ==
=== Winchester to Keene ===
NH 10 begins at the Massachusetts state line in Winchester, where it connects to Massachusetts Route 10. It runs northeast into the town center where it intersects with NH 78 and NH 119. NH 119 joins NH 10 briefly before splitting off to the east. NH 10 continues north along the Ashuelot River, through the town of Swanzey and into the city of Keene. NH 10 meets NH 12 and NH 101 at a traffic circle near Keene State College and turns west, joining the latter two routes to their intersection with NH 9. At this intersection, NH 101 ends while NH 10 and NH 12 turn north onto NH 9 eastbound. The three overlapped routes pass west of downtown Keene for just over 1/2 mile (0.80 km), then NH 9 and NH 10 exit NH 12 at a trumpet interchange and turn northeast. NH 9 and NH 10 remain overlapped for another 2.8 miles (4.5 km) before NH 10 splits off to the north and crosses into the town of Gilsum.

=== Gilsum to Lebanon ===
NH 10 passes through Gilsum with no major junctions, then enters Marlow, where it has a 1.0-mile (1.6 km) overlap with NH 123. Continuing north, NH 10 meets the eastern terminus of NH 123A then crosses into Lempster. The highway has no major junctions in Lempster and continues north into Goshen where it intersects the northern terminus of NH 31. NH 10 continues into the town of Newport, where it shares a brief concurrency with NH 11 and NH 103 in the town center. The highway continues through Croydon with no major junctions, then into Grantham where it intersects with the northern terminus of NH 114 before interchanging with Interstate 89.

NH 10 joins I-89 at exit 13 and runs along the Interstate highway for 14.7 miles (23.7 km), through the southwest corner of the town of Enfield and into Lebanon, where it leaves I-89 at exit 19.

=== Lebanon to Haverhill ===
NH 10 exits I-89 onto U.S. Route 4, which it immediately joins westbound. US 4 and NH 10 cross the Mascoma River into the village of West Lebanon, where they intersect with NH 12A (providing local access to I-89). Just over 1/4 mile (0.40 km) to the north, US 4 splits off to cross the Connecticut River into White River Junction, Vermont. Now running along the eastern bank of the river, NH 10 continues north into the town of Hanover. At Dartmouth College in the heart of town, NH 10 meets its only child route, NH 10A, a connector to I-91 and US 5 in Norwich, Vermont, then intersects the northern terminus of NH 120 (NH 120 is cosigned with NH 10 on North Park Street). NH 10 continues north into the town of Lyme, where the only intersection of note is to East Thetford Road, a connector to Thetford, Vermont, which becomes Vermont Route 113 upon crossing the border to the west. Crossing into Orford, NH 10 intersects and briefly overlaps NH 25A before that route splits off to cross into Fairlee, Vermont, and meet US 5. NH 10 continues into Piermont and intersects with NH 25 (connecting to VT 25 just to the west) and NH 25C. NH 25 turns onto NH 10 northbound, and the two routes are cosigned for 5.3 miles (8.5 km) into the neighboring town of Haverhill. After crossing the town line, NH 25 splits off to begin its eastward trek across the state. NH 10 continues north along the Connecticut River and intersects the western terminus of NH 116 in the village of North Haverhill. Several miles to the north, NH 10 intersects the southern terminus of NH 135 and enters the village of Woodsville, where it reaches US 302, which crosses into Wells River, Vermont, just to the west.

NH 10 officially ends at US 302, but is cosigned with it through Bath, Landaff, Lisbon and into Littleton to its intersection with NH 18, just north of I-93.

== History ==

NH 10 was first designated in 1922 as part of the New England road marking system. The original New England Interstate Route 10 extended from Route 1 (now U.S. Route 1) in New Haven, Connecticut, to Route 18 (now US 302 / NH 18) in Littleton, New Hampshire.

When the U.S. Highway system was introduced in 1926, it supplanted the New England route system and the entirety of existing Route 10 was redesignated as state highways. In 1935, the newly designated U.S. Route 302 was assigned to the existing route between Haverhill and Littleton, effectively making the northernmost part of NH 10's routing redundant. As a result, NH 10 was eventually truncated back to the junction with US 302 in Haverhill, but for historical reasons it seems the state decided to post NH 10 signage along the former route.

NH 10 as signed today retains most of its original 1922 alignment. The one major exception to this is the routing of NH 10 along I-89 between Grantham and Lebanon. Many segments of the former surface alignment are still in use, with several labeled as "Old Route 10."

== Major intersections ==
County	Location	mi	km	Destinations	Notes
Cheshire	Winchester	0.000	0.000	Route 10 south (Wanamaker Road) to Route 63 – Northfield	Continuation into Massachusetts
Cheshire	Winchester	4.409	7.096	NH 119 west (Hinsdale Road) – Hinsdale, Brattleboro, VT NH 78 south (Warwick Road) – Warwick, MA	Southern end of concurrency with NH 119; northern terminus of NH 78
Cheshire	Winchester	4.958	7.979	NH 119 east (Richmond Road) – Richmond, Fitzwilliam	Northern end of NH 119 concurrency
Cheshire	Keene	16.757	26.968	NH 12 south / NH 101 east – Peterborough	Southern end of concurrency with NH 12 / NH 101
Cheshire	Keene	17.280	27.809	NH 9 west (Franklin Pierce Highway) – Chesterfield, Brattleboro, VT; NH 101	Southern end of concurrency with NH 9; western terminus of NH 101
Cheshire	Keene	18.025	29.008	West Street – Keene	Interchange
Cheshire	Keene	18.480	29.741	NH 12 north – Walpole	Northern end of concurrency with NH 12
Cheshire	Keene	21.222	34.153	NH 9 east (Franklin Pierce Highway) – Concord	Northern end of NH 9 concurrency
Cheshire	Marlow	32.645	52.537	NH 123 south – Stoddard	Southern end of concurrency with NH 123
Cheshire	Marlow	33.659	54.169	NH 123 north (Forest Road) – Alstead, Walpole	Northern end of concurrency with NH 123
Cheshire	Marlow	38.035	61.211	NH 123A west – Acworth, Alstead	Eastern terminus of NH 123A
Sullivan	Goshen	47.631	76.655	NH 31 south – Washington, Hillsborough	Northern terminus of NH 31
Sullivan	Newport	52.926	85.176	NH 11 / NH 103 west (Elm Street) – Claremont	Southern end of concurrency with NH 11 / NH 103
Sullivan	Newport	53.157	85.548	NH 11 / NH 103 east (Sunapee Street) – Sunapee	Northern end of concurrency with NH 11 / NH 103
Sullivan	Grantham	63.391	102.018	NH 114 south (Grantham Road) – Springfield	Northern terminus of NH 114
Sullivan	Grantham	64.528	103.848	I-89 south – Concord	Exit 13 on I-89; southern end of concurrency with I-89
Sullivan	Grantham	69.112	111.225	North Grantham (via Old Route 10)	Exit 14 on I-89; southbound exit and northbound entrance
Grafton	Enfield	71.468	115.017	Smith Pond Road / Old Route 10	Exit 15 on I-89
Grafton	Enfield	72.891	117.307	Methodist Hill Road, Eastman Hill Road – Purmort	Exit 16 on I-89
Grafton	Lebanon	75.220	121.055	US 4 to NH 4A – Enfield, Canaan	Exit 17 on I-89
Grafton	Lebanon	77.110	124.097	NH 120 – Lebanon, Hanover	Exit 18 on I-89
Grafton	Lebanon	79.209	127.475	I-89 north – Vermont US 4 east – Lebanon	Northern end of concurrency with I-89 Exit 19; southern end of concurrency with US 4
Grafton	Lebanon	81.140	130.582	NH 12A south (South Main Street)	Northern terminus of NH 12A
Grafton	Lebanon	81.475	131.121	US 4 west (Bridge Street)	Northern end of concurrency with US 4
Grafton	Hanover	85.373	137.395	NH 10A west (West Wheelock Street) to I-91 – Vermont	Eastern terminus of NH 10A
Grafton	Hanover	85.742	137.988	NH 120 south (South Park Street) – Lebanon	Northern terminus of NH 120
Grafton	Orford	102.918	165.630	NH 25A east – Orfordville, Wentworth	Southern end of concurrency with NH 25A
Grafton	Orford	103.262	166.184	NH 25A west (Bridge Street) to I-91 – Fairlee, VT	Northern end of concurrency with NH 25A
Grafton	Piermont	109.078	175.544	NH 25 west – Bradford, VT NH 25C east (Lake Tarleton Road) – Warren	Southern end of concurrency with NH 25; western terminus of NH 25C
Grafton	Haverhill	114.395	184.101	NH 25 east (Mt. Moosilauke Highway) – Plymouth	Northern end of concurrency with NH 25
Grafton	Haverhill	118.272	190.340	NH 116 north (Benton Road) – Benton	Southern terminus of NH 116
Grafton	Haverhill	121.518	195.564	NH 135 north (South Court Street)	Southern terminus of NH 135; no right turn from NH 10 south
Grafton	Haverhill	122.476	197.106	US 302 (Central Street) – Woodsville, Bath, Littleton	Northern terminus
1.000 mi = 1.609 km; 1.000 km = 0.621 mi: Concurrency terminus

== Suffixed routes ==
=== New Hampshire Route 10A ===
Route 10A
- Location: Hanover
- Length: 0.548 mi (882 m)

New Hampshire Route 10A (NH 10A) is an east–west highway in Hanover. It is the shortest state highway in New Hampshire, slightly more than 1/2 mile (0.80 km) in length. The eastern terminus of NH 10A is in the center of Hanover at the junction with NH 10, which is Main Street. The western terminus of NH 10A is on Ledyard Bridge over the Connecticut River, which is the border with Vermont. Across the bridge, the road becomes Vermont Route 10A (Main Street in the town of Norwich). In Hanover, NH 10A is locally named West Wheelock Road.

== See also ==
- New England Interstate Route 10
