= Norwich Mid-Century Modern Historic District =

Historic district in Vermont, United States

- U.S. National Register of Historic Places
- U.S. Historic district
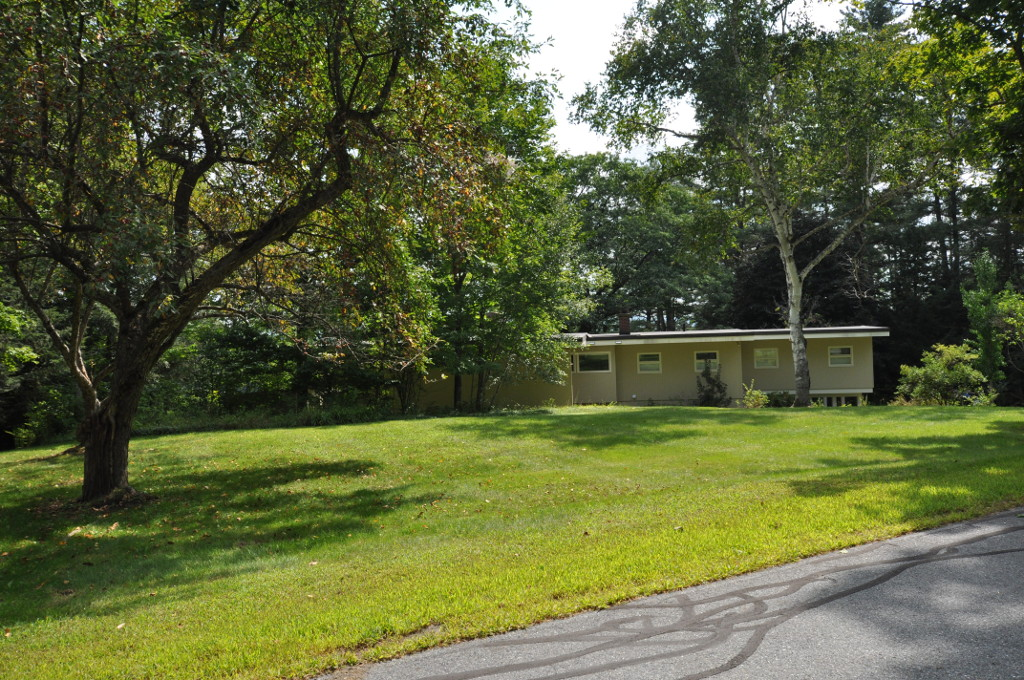

- Location within Vermont Location within the United States
- Location: Parts of Hopson, Pine Tree & Spring Pond Rds., Norwich, Vermont
- Coordinates: 43°42′42″N 72°19′3″W
- Area: 125 acres (51 ha)
- Architect: Emerson, Joseph; Hatch, Joseph
- Architectural style: Mid-Century Modern
- NRHP reference No.: 100002604
- Added to NRHP: June 25, 2018

The Norwich Mid-Century Modern Historic District encompasses a concentrated collection of Mid-Century Modern houses in Norwich, Vermont. Located on parts of Hopson, Pine Tree, and Spring Pond Roads, it is one of best collections of this type in the state. It was listed in the National Register of Historic Places in 2018.

== Description and history ==
The state of Vermont has not historically been a place where modern architecture found a receptive home. The eastern town of Norwich, influenced by the academic environments of Norwich University and Dartmouth College (the latter in nearby Hanover, New Hampshire), is one place where the ideas of mid-20th century modernism, promoted by Frank Lloyd Wright and others, were able to flourish. In 1951, Keith and Edna Warner (he a retired businessman) moved to Norwich, purchased a large parcel of land on Hopson Road, and built one of the first Mid-Century Modern houses in the town. The Warners subdivided the land, selling building lots to others and building further such houses. Their house and several they built were designed by Charles McKirahan of Fort Lauderdale, Florida.

The district is located about 1 mile (1.6 km) west of the village center of Norwich, on a low ridge. Hopson Road runs below the height of the ridge in a roughly north–south direction, with Pine Tree and Spring Pond Roads creating a small rural subdivision on its west side. There are fourteen buildings in the district that are historically significant. Their construction is typical of the Mid-Century Modern style, using a variety of building materials on the exteriors, with modern placement of fixed-pane and casement windows, and generally flat roofs. They are typically sited to take advantage of the rocky sloping terrain to provide views of the surrounding landscape.

== See also ==
- National Register of Historic Places listings in Windsor County, Vermont
