= Hanover High School (New Hampshire) =

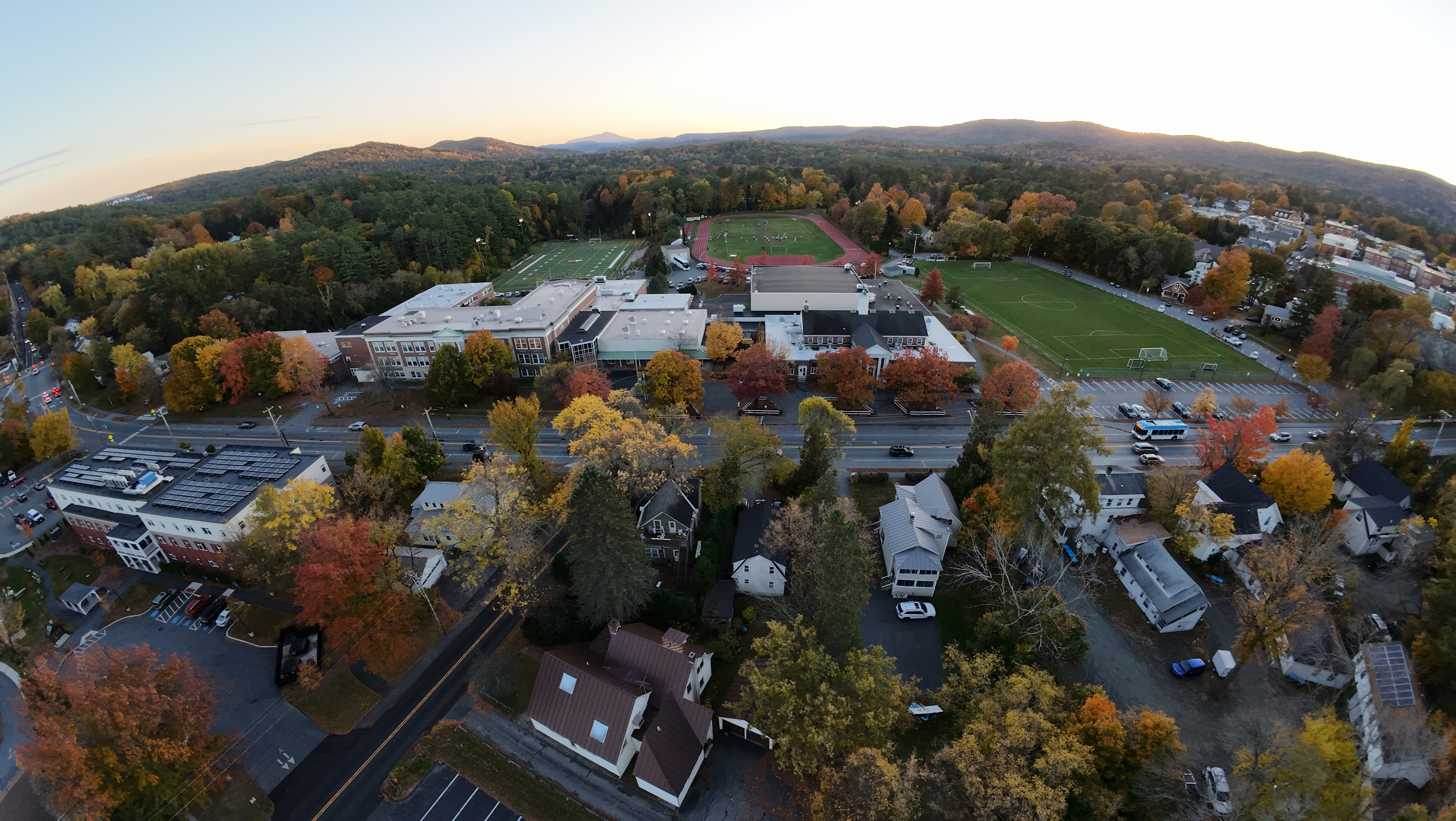

Location
- 41 Lebanon St. Hanover, New Hampshire; United States; 43°41′56″N 72°17′02″W

Information
- Type: Public high school
- Established: 1888; 138 years ago
- School district: Dresden School District
- Principal: Julie Stevenson
- Teaching staff: 62.50 (FTE) (2023–24)
- Enrollment: 683 (2023–24)
- Student to teacher ratio: 10.93 (2023–24)
- Campus: Small town
- Colors: Cardinal (color)& White
- Mascot: Bears
- Rival: Lebanon
- Newspaper: Broadside
- Website: hhs.sau70.org

Hanover High School is the only high school in the Dresden School District, and is located in Hanover, New Hampshire, United States. In 1963 it became the first interstate high school in the country as part of a bill that was the last signed into action by John F. Kennedy. Today it accepts students from several communities in New Hampshire and Vermont. Enrollment is approximately 786 students, the majority of whom come from the towns of Hanover (New Hampshire) and Norwich, Vermont. 11% of the student body attends on a tuition basis from towns such as Cornish and Lyme, New Hampshire, and Strafford and Hartland, Vermont. The school employs 79 full-time faculty members.

== Academics ==
Hanover High was recognized in 2009 by BusinessWeek in their "America's Best High Schools" annual article as having the "Best Overall Academic Performance" in New Hampshire, with a GreatSchools rating of 10/10.

The school is accredited by the New England Association of Schools and Colleges, and over 96% of students are accepted to or are planning to attend post secondary education after graduating.

The academic program is divided into the traditional five departments: English, Math, Science, Social Studies, and Foreign Language. Each department offers a selection of courses; however, all freshmen must take a standard set of courses. As students advance, additional opportunities become available. The school's curriculum and policies emphasize individual student freedoms. For example, seniors often elect to design and complete an independent study project that academically explores a personal interest. With Dartmouth College a short walk from the school, some students attend courses at the college when they have exhausted the high school's offerings.

== Extracurricular and elective activities ==
The girls' cross country team was fourth in the nation during the 2007 season. The boys' varsity soccer team has won the state championship for the last six years, as well as the state sportsmanship award for the past four years. The boys' hockey and lacrosse teams are both the smallest schools in Division I, yet Hanover almost always makes it to the state finals in at least one of the sports, if not both. The 2009 fall campaign was especially successful, with field hockey, boys' cross country, girls' cross country and boys' soccer all being crowned state champions. More recently, the 2023 boys' cross country team won the division 2 championships, and fourth at the New England Championships. The same year, the girls' team placed second in division two, and fifth at New Englands.

The physical education program features an adventure education program begun in 1987 by physical education teacher Glyn Reinders. Widely regarded as one of the finest PE programs at the high school level, it features one of the largest ropes courses in the world.

The school has a number of music ensembles (both official and student-run), publications, community service organizations, a drama group "Footlighters" that puts on two shows and a musical each year, a student-organized drama group "SOS; Students On Stage" that puts on one show a year, and a quiz bowl team that has in recent years won both New Hampshire and Vermont state championships.

HHS is a democratic school revolving around the Hanover High Council. The council has the authority to act on all matters at Hanover High School not controlled by school board policy, state policy, administrative regulations established by the Superintendent of the Schools, and rules and regulations published in the Student Handbook of Hanover High School. Council elections are held each spring.

== Mascot controversy ==
In 2020, after more than a year of debate, the school council elected to change the school mascot due to complaints that the marauder was offensive to those who had been victims of sexual assault. The proceeding election to determine the new mascot led to a five way runoff, with one of the most popular choices, the Jalapeños, being disqualified for fears of cultural appropriation. The results of the runoff, however, were invalidated due to widespread plagiarism among many popular designs and one popular design being removed from the competition by its creator. The current mascot is a bear, designed by an alumnus, with the teeth as outlines of the VT and NH state to show the interstate nature of the school.

== Athletics ==
Hanover has a comprehensive athletics program, with players competing at both the varsity and junior varsity levels. Sports offered include baseball, basketball, cross country running, cross-country skiing, crew, field hockey, football, golf, ice hockey, lacrosse, rugby, ski jumping, soccer, softball, swimming, tennis, track, ultimate, and volleyball.

Notable girls' teams include the perennial power house cross country team, which won the Class I state championship from 2004 through 2009, and placed fourth at the Nike Team Nationals high school championships. The girls' soccer team has also won NH Division II championships in 2014, 2015 and 2018. The girls' varsity tennis team appeared in five consecutive state championship finals from 2013 through 2017. The girls varsity hockey team is a strong force at Hanover, winning 11/12 state titles for NHIAA girls hockey. Along with the girls varsity basketball team who recently won the 2022 division 2 state championship. They have been undefeated for three seasons straight in regular season games.

Notable boys' teams include the boys' cross country running team, that won back-to-back state championships in 2008 and 2009. The boys' soccer team is one of the most successful teams at Hanover, having won the Class I state championships every year from 2005 to 2010, and the Division I title in 2013 and 2019. They have won a state-record total of 18 overall. The boys' golf team has been consistently one of the top programs in the state, winning over 30 state championships since the early 1980s. In 1989 the golf team finished an undefeated 48–0 season under coach Glyn Reinders (791-50) and were named by the Boston Globe "New England Team of the Year".

In recent years swimming has become one of the favored sports, along with crew. One out of every six Hanover High students row in the spring each year.

Varsity sports fielded include:

Fall

- Boys' soccer
- Girls' soccer
- Cross country
- Field hockey
- Volleyball
- Football
- Golf

Winter

- Boys' basketball
- Boys' ice hockey
- Girls' ice hockey
- Indoor track
- Swimming & diving
- Alpine skiing
- Nordic skiing
- Ski jumping

Spring

- Boys' and girls' crew
- Baseball
- Softball
- Tennis
- Boys' and girls' track
- Boys' and girls' lacrosse

Club sports include rugby union, fencing, ultimate, and fall crew.

== Notable alumni ==
- Barbara Bedford, Olympic swimmer
- Russell Wolf Brown, professional runner
- Jason Chin, children’s author/illustrator
- Charlie Clouser, musician (Nine Inch Nails)
- Jonathan Finer, Rhodes scholar, Former White House Deputy National Security Advisor
- Sam Griesemer, musician (Samo Sound Boy)
- Stu Hamm, musician
- Jim Holland, Olympic ski jumper
- Joe Holland, Olympic Nordic combined skier
- Mike Holland, Olympic ski jumper
- Noah Kahan, musician
- Hannah Kearney, Olympic freestyle skier
- Julia Krass, Olympic freestyle skier
- Wesley Edwin "Bud" Lanyon, ornithologist and museum curator
- Sean Patrick Maloney, congressman from New York
- Dylan Matthews, blogger and writer (Washington Post, Vox.com)
- Elizabeth McIntyre, Olympic freestyle skier
- Susan McLane, New Hampshire state legislator
- Ralph Miller, Olympic skier, World Speed Record holder for 15 years
- Robby Mook, campaign manager for Hillary Clinton
- Reed Morano, film and TV director and cinematographer (The Handmaid's Tale)
- Kevin Pearce, professional snowboarder
- Mary Roach, science writer
- Tom Shear, musician (Assemblage 23)
- Betsy Snite, Olympic ski medalist
- Jon Spencer, musician (Jon Spencer Blues Explosion)
- Zephyr Teachout, academic, attorney and activist
- Celia Woodsmith, Grammy-nominated bluegrass musician
