= Ledyard Bridge =

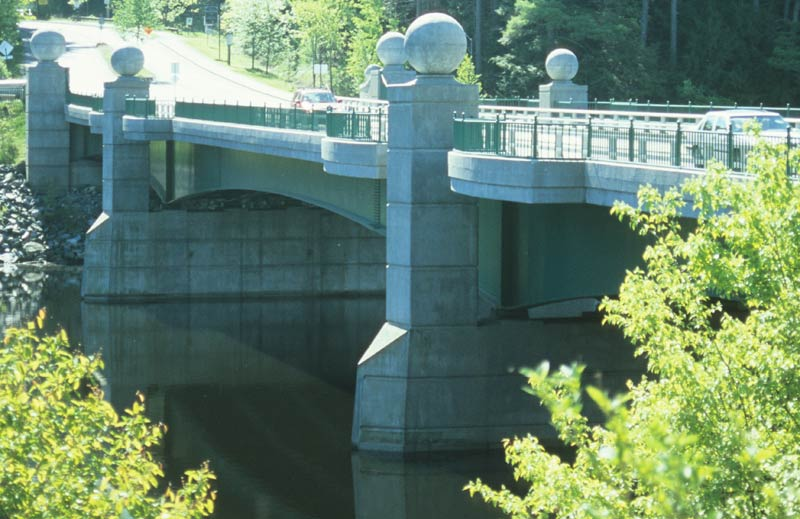
- Coordinates: 43°42′13″N 72°17′59″W
- Carries: Vermont Route 10A, New Hampshire Route 10A, Appalachian Trail
- Crosses: Connecticut River
- Locale: Hanover, New Hampshire and Norwich, Vermont
- Maintained by: New Hampshire Department of Transportation

Characteristics
- Design: Beam bridge, originally a covered bridge

History
- Construction start: 1998
- Opened: 1859, 2000
- Closed: 1935

Location
- Interactive map of Ledyard Bridge

The Ledyard Bridge crosses the Connecticut River to connect Hanover, New Hampshire to Norwich, Vermont. It is the third bridge at this crossing to bear the name of the adventurer John Ledyard.

== History ==
The first "Ledyard Free Bridge" was a covered bridge built in 1859 that was the first bridge across the Connecticut not to charge a toll. (It was the latest of several bridges at this site that went back to the late 18th century.) The bridge was named after Ledyard in 1859 because its eastern abutment was near the site of a tree that Ledyard felled during 1773 in order to make the dugout canoe in which he left Dartmouth College to continue his world travels.

The bridge now standing was built between 1998 and 2000 by the New Hampshire Department of Transportation. At each end it displays a pair of "bridge balls," the controversial Classical ornaments cast in concrete that refer to the gateway to Tuck Drive nearby on the Hanover shore. They are the product of a Concord architect brought in by NHDOT to infuse some extra aesthetic appeal into the design of the bridge.

The Ledyard Bridge carries the designation of New Hampshire Route 10A and Vermont Route 10A, a short state highway linking U.S. Route 5 and Interstate 91 on the Vermont side with New Hampshire Route 10 on the New Hampshire side. The Appalachian Trail uses the pedestrian walkway to cross the river.

== Border location ==
Although the border between New Hampshire and Vermont was set at the Vermont shore in 1933, the bridge's monument to that border rests near the middle of the crossing.

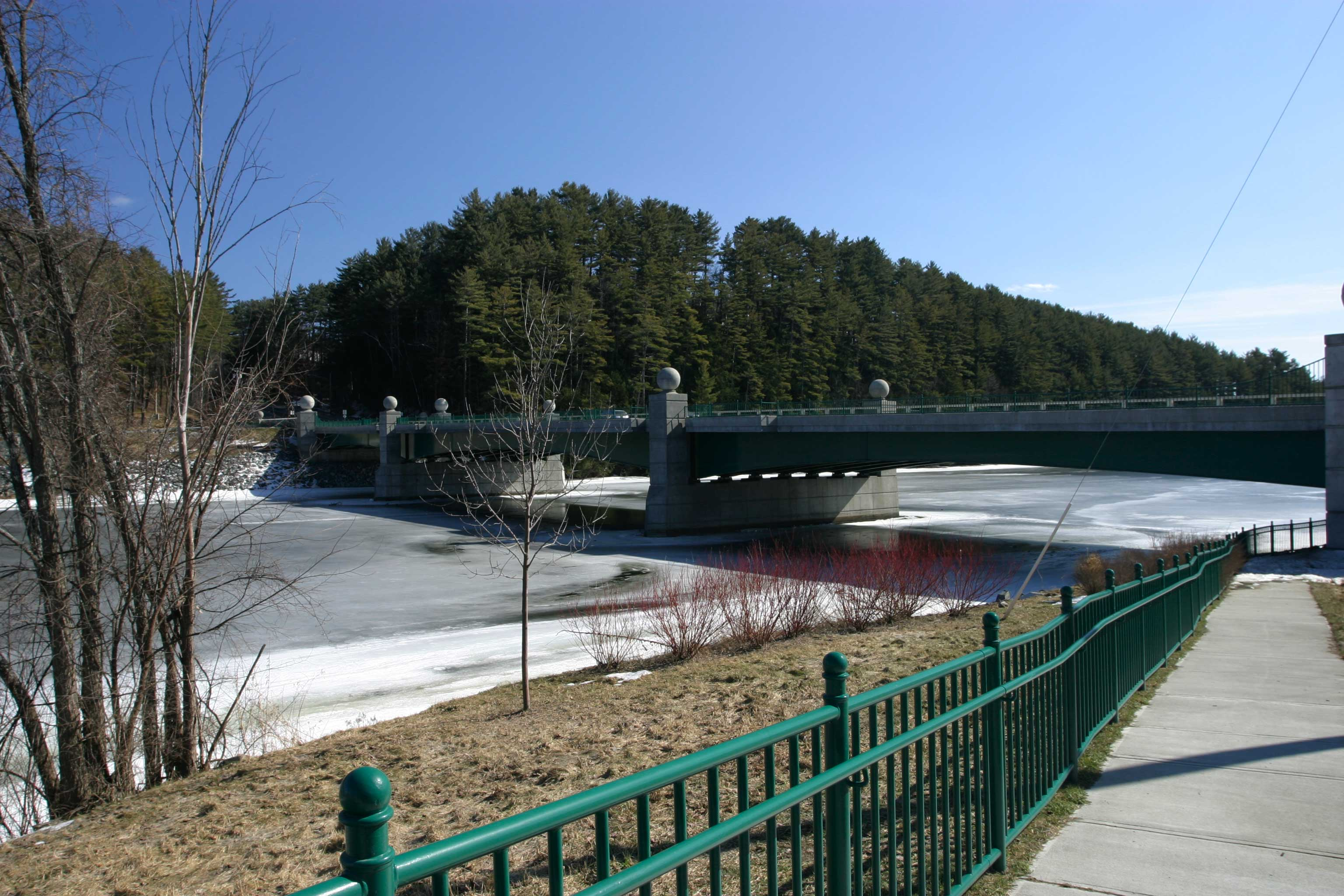
Ledyard from Vermont

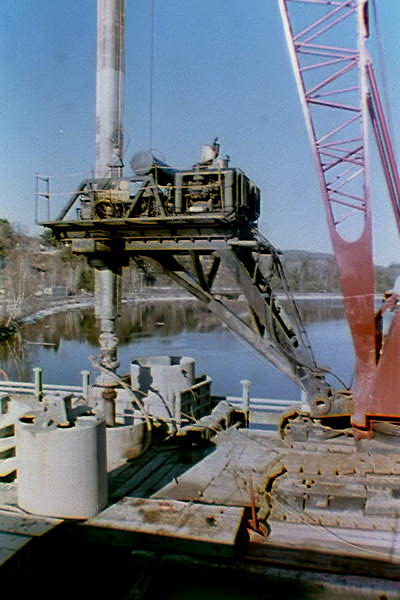
Bore shaft operations on Vermont side

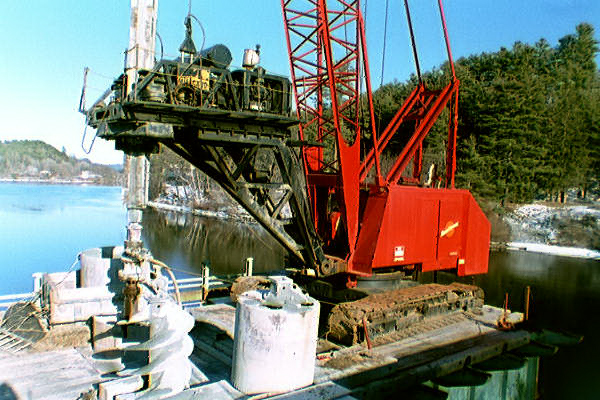
Bore shaft operations

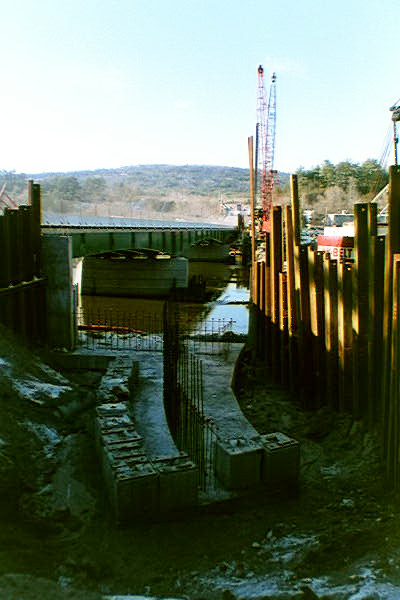
NH abutment footing

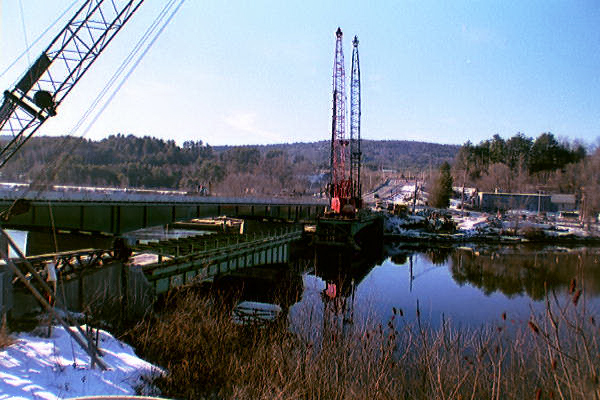
NH view of old and new Ledyard

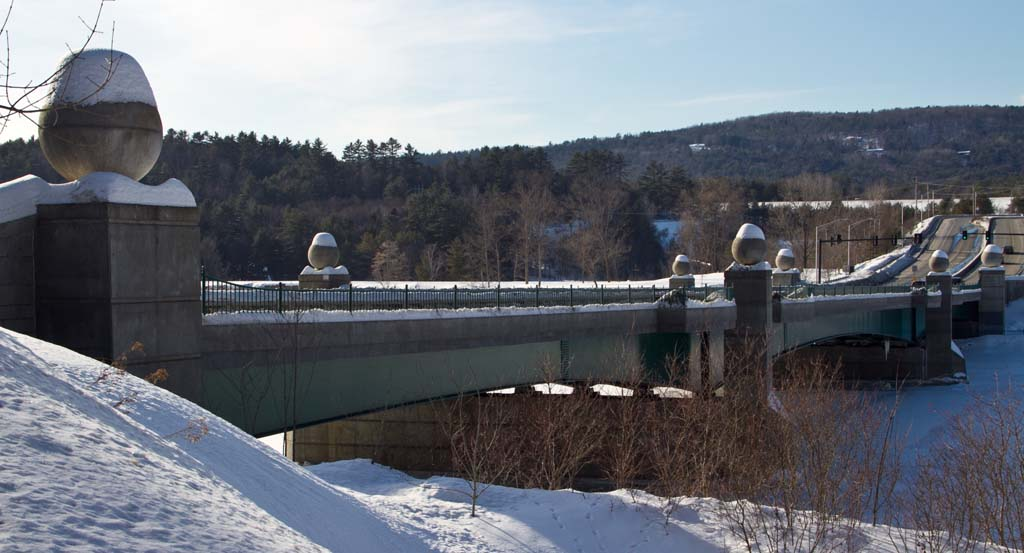
Ledyard from New Hampshire

== See also ==
- List of crossings of the Connecticut River
