= Louis Hodes =

American computer scientist

- Born: 19 June 1934; New York City, United States
- Died: 19 June 2008 (aged 74); Bethesda, Maryland
- Citizenship: United States
- Education: B.S., Polytechnic Institute of Brooklyn; Ph.D., MIT (1962)
- Known for: Lisp; Pattern recognition Logic programming
- Scientific career
- Fields: Mathematics; Computer science Cancer research
- Institutions: Massachusetts Institute of Technology; National Institutes of Health; National Cancer Institute
- Thesis: Hyperarithmetical Real Numbers and Hyperarithmetical Analysis (1962)
- Doctoral advisor: Hartley Rogers

Louis Hodes (June 19, 1934 – June 30, 2008) was an American mathematician, computer scientist, and cancer researcher.

== Early life and computer science work ==
Louis Hodes got his Bachelor of Science (B.S.) from the Polytechnic Institute of Brooklyn. He got his Doctor of Philosophy (Ph.D.) from the Massachusetts Institute of Technology (MIT) in 1962, under Hartley Rogers with a thesis on computability. With John McCarthy, in the late 1950s and early 1960s, he helped produce the earliest implementations of the programming language Lisp, and under Marvin Minsky he did early research on visual pattern recognition in Lisp. He is also credited by some with the idea, and an initial implementation, of logic programming.

== Cancer research ==
In 1966 he moved into cancer-related research, specifically at National Institutes of Health and later the National Cancer Institute where he turned his interest in visual pattern recognition to medical imaging applications. He also worked on efficient algorithms for screening chemical compounds for studying chemical carcinogenesis. His work on models of clustering for chemical compounds was pronounced a "milestone" by the Developmental Therapeutics Program of the National Cancer Institute, for "revolutioniz[ing] the selection of compounds of interest by measuring the novelty of a chemical structure by comparing it to known compounds."
