= Norwich (CDP), Vermont =

Census-designated place in Vermont, United States

Norwich, Vermont
- Census-designated place
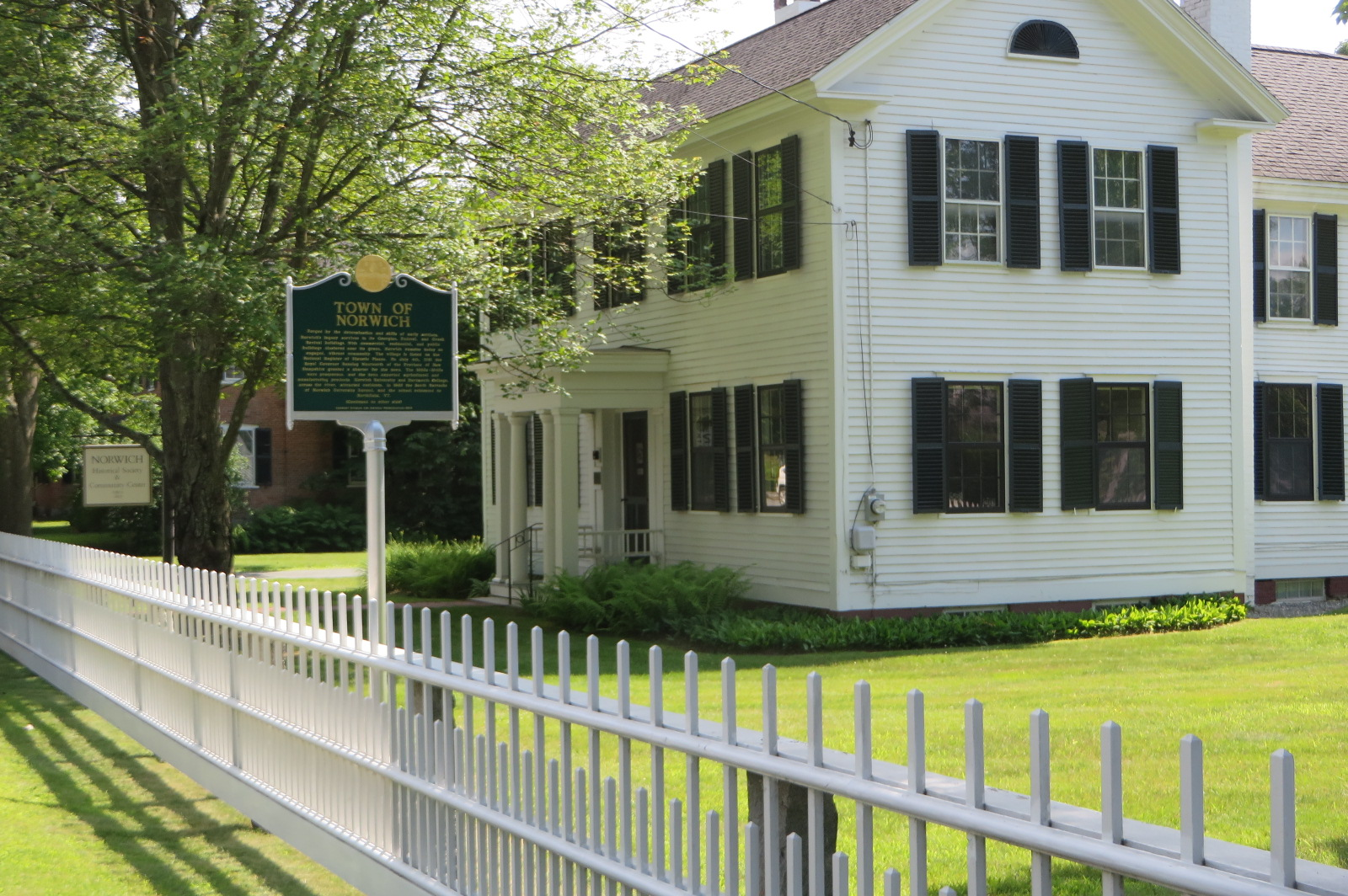
- Norwich Historical Society building on South Main Street

- Location in Windsor County and the state of Vermont
- Coordinates: 43°43′13″N 72°18′07″W
- Country: United States
- State: Vermont
- County: Windsor

Area
  - Total: 1.5 sq mi (3.8 km^{2})
  - Land: 1.5 sq mi (3.8 km^{2})
  - Water: 0 sq mi (0.0 km^{2})
- Elevation: 653 ft (199 m)

Population (2010)
  - Total: 878
  - Density: 600/sq mi (230/km^{2})
- Time zone: UTC-5 (Eastern (EST))
  - Summer (DST): UTC-4 (EDT)
- ZIP code: 05055
- Area code: 802
- FIPS code: 50-52825
- GNIS feature ID: 2586646

Norwich is a census-designated place (CDP) that comprises the central village of the town of Norwich, Windsor County, Vermont, United States. As of the 2010 census, the population of the CDP was 878, compared to 3,414 for the entire town of Norwich.

== Geography ==
Norwich is located in northeastern Windsor County. U.S. Route 5 passes through the village, connecting with Thetford to the north and White River Junction to the south. Interstate 91 forms the eastern edge of the CDP, with access to the village at Exit 13. Vermont Route 10A leads east from Exit 13 across the Connecticut River to Hanover, New Hampshire.
