= Dresden School District =

Interstate school district in New Hampshire and Vermont, formed by interstate compact

Coordinates: 43°41′57″N 72°17′1″W

The Dresden School District is the first interstate school district in the United States. It operates the Francis C. Richmond Middle School and Hanover High School in Hanover, New Hampshire. The district is part of the New Hampshire's School Administrative Unit (SAU) 70, which also includes two other school districts, each with its own school board: the Hanover School District, which operates the Bernice A. Ray Elementary School in Hanover, and the Norwich School District, which operates the Marion Cross Elementary School in Norwich, Vermont.

== History ==
Norwich, Vermont, and Hanover, New Hampshire, lie on opposite sides of the Connecticut River. Many Norwich residents were employed at Dartmouth College and the Mary Hitchcock Hospital in Hanover. Before 1964, Hanover had provided secondary education to Norwich students on a tuition basis, paid by the Norwich school district, which had no local high school. Growth in enrollment in Hanover High School necessitated new construction, which would have been easier to finance with contributions from Norwich. Norwich was unable by state law to contribute to Hanover's construction cost, and Hanover was unable by state law to give Norwich any voice in the operation of the schools.

Several Dartmouth College faculty members on the Hanover and Norwich school boards (John G. Kemeny, later president of Dartmouth, in Hanover and Donald Kreider and William Ballard in Norwich) sought to solve these problems by creating the Dresden School District. They secured consent from the towns of Hanover and Norwich, the legislatures of New Hampshire and Vermont, and the United States Congress (whose consent was required because the Compact Clause [Article I, Section 10, Clause 3] of the United States Constitution provides that "No State shall, without the Consent of Congress,... enter into any Agreement or Compact with another State"). The congressional bill creating the district was one of the last John F. Kennedy signed before his assassination in 1963.

The name Dresden was taken from the name of the corner of Hanover in which Dartmouth College was located in the 1770s. Between 1776 and 1784, citizens of Dresden sought to secede from the state of New Hampshire, either by joining with Norwich and other nearby towns in a new state called New Connecticut or by joining the state of Vermont. The dispute ended in 1784 when Vermont, under pressure from George Washington, rescinded its 1781 annexation of Dresden.

== See also ==
- Interstate compact
- Rivendell Interstate School District, serving Orford, NH, Vershire, VT, West Fairlee, VT, and Fairlee, VT
- Union County–College Corner Joint School District, an earlier joint district formed in Indiana and Ohio without congressional approval
