= New Hampshire Route 120 =

North-south state highway in New Hampshire, US

New Hampshire Route 120
- Map of western New Hampshire with NH 120 highlighted in red

Route information
- Maintained by NHDOT
- Length: 26.928 mi (43.336 km)

Major junctions
- South end: NH 11 / NH 103 in Claremont
- North end: NH 10 in Hanover

Location
- Country: United States
- State: New Hampshire
- Counties: Sullivan, Grafton

Highway system
- New Hampshire Highway System; Interstate; US; State; Turnpikes
← NH 119	→ NH 121

New Hampshire Route 120 is a 26.928-mile-long (43.336 km) secondary north–south state highway in Sullivan and Grafton counties in the upper Connecticut River Valley region of New Hampshire. Its southern terminus is at New Hampshire Route 11 and New Hampshire Route 103 in Claremont. Its northern terminus is at New Hampshire Route 10 in Hanover.

== Route description ==
NH 120 begins in downtown Claremont on the Sugar River at NH 11 / NH 103. The initial stretch of the highway is on North Street but then it turns onto Hanover Street and heads north, passing through the towns of Cornish and Plainfield with no major junctions. NH 120 enters Lebanon and proceeds directly into the heart of the city, where it meets (and briefly overlaps) U.S. Route 4 at a large roundabout. NH 120 turns north again, interchanging with Interstate 89 / NH 10, and continues out of town. NH 120 then crosses into Hanover and proceeds northwest into the center of town where it terminates at NH 10 near Dartmouth College.

NH 120 is cosigned with NH 10 on North Park Street in Hanover to terminate at Lyme Road/College Street, but this does not appear to be part of the official routing.

== Major intersections ==
County	Location	mi	km	Destinations	Notes
Sullivan	Claremont	0.000	0.000	NH 11 / NH 103 (Broad Street / Washington Street) to NH 12 – Newport, Charlestown, Walpole	Southern terminus
Grafton	Lebanon	21.267	34.226	US 4 east (Bank Street) – Enfield, Canaan	Southern end of concurrency with US 4
Grafton	Lebanon	21.500	34.601	US 4 west (Mechanic Street) – West Lebanon	Northern end of concurrency with US 4
Grafton	Lebanon	22.109– 22.291	35.581– 35.874	I-89 / NH 10 – Enfield, Concord, West Lebanon, Vermont	Exit 18 on I-89
Grafton	Hanover	26.928	43.336	NH 10 (East Wheelock Street / North Park Street) to NH 10A – Lyme, Norwich VT	Northern terminus
1.000 mi = 1.609 km; 1.000 km = 0.621 mi: Concurrency terminus
