= Elizabeth Emerson Atwater =

Naturalist, botanist and botanical collector

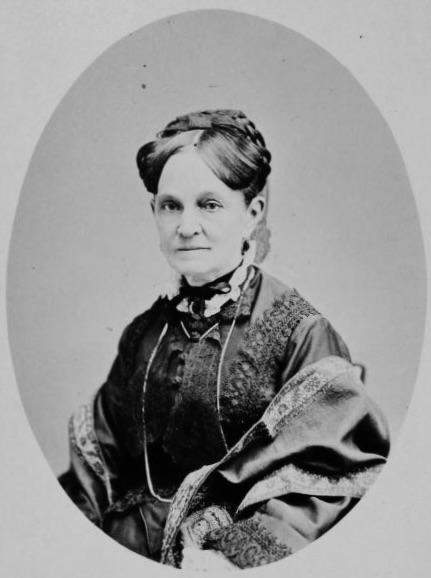
- Born: August 8, 1812; Norwich, Vermont
- Died: April 11, 1878 (aged 65)
- Scientific career
- Fields: Botany

Elizabeth Atwater (née Emerson; August 8, 1812 – April 11, 1878) was an American botanist.

== Early life and education ==
Atwater was born Elizabeth Emerson in Norwich, Vermont, on August 8, 1812, and at the age of 14 years old she attended the distinguished women's school in Troy Seminary, New York, where she began studying plants. She married Samuel T. Atwater in 1839 and moved to Chicago in 1856.

== Career ==
During a visit to Yellowstone National Park in 1873, Atwater collected 2,000 specimens. A new species of moss was later named after her, Bryum atwateriae, by Carl Müller.

Atwater became a notable botanist, corresponding with other famous botanists of this period, including Charles Mohr.

She was acquainted with Mary Todd Lincoln after the assassination of Abraham Lincoln in 1865, and received "a gorgeous, photographic album presented me on last New Years day by Mrs. Lincoln, wife of our martyrd President" (March 36, 1867).

Upon her death, she left 30 boxes of botanical specimens to the Chicago Academy of Sciences. A collection of her scrapbooks were rediscovered in 2005 in the basement room of the Chicago Academy of Sciences. However most of her specimens were lost in the Great Chicago Fire of 1871.
