= Hartley Rogers Jr. =

American mathematician (1926–2015)

- Born: July 6, 1926; Buffalo, New York, United States
- Died: July 17, 2015 (aged 89); Waltham, Massachusetts
- Occupation: Mathematician
- Known for: Worked on computability theory
- Spouse: Dr. Adrianne E. Rogers
- Children: 3 (including Hartley R. Rogers)
- Parents: Hartley Rogers (father); Margaret Rogers (mother)
- Relatives: Joanna Macy (sister)

Hartley Rogers Jr. (July 6, 1926 – July 17, 2015) was an American mathematician who worked in computability theory, and was a professor in the Mathematics Department of the Massachusetts Institute of Technology.

== Early life and education ==
Born in 1926 in Buffalo, New York, Rogers studied English as an undergraduate at Yale University, graduating in 1946. After visiting the University of Cambridge under a Henry Fellowship, he returned to Yale for a master's degree in physics, which he completed in 1950. He studied mathematics under Alonzo Church at Princeton, earned a second master's degree in 1951, and received his Ph.D. there in 1952.

== Career ==
He was a Benjamin Peirce Lecturer at Harvard University from 1952 to 1955. After holding a visiting position at MIT, he became a professor in the MIT Mathematics Department in 1956. His doctoral students included Patrick Fischer, Louis Hodes, Carl Jockusch, Andrew Kahr, David Luckham, Rohit Parikh, David Park, and John Stillwell. He chaired the MIT faculty senate from 1971 to 1973 and served as associate provost of the university from 1974 to 1980.

== Personal life ==
Beyond teaching and research, Rogers was an avid rower and rowing competitor.

He retired as a professor emeritus in 2009, and died on July 17, 2015.

== Mathematical work ==
Rogers worked in mathematical logic, particularly recursion theory, and wrote the classic text Theory of Recursive Functions and Effective Computability. The Rogers equivalence theorem is named after him.

Rogers won the Lester R. Ford Award in 1965 for his expository article Information Theory.

== Selected works ==
- Rogers, Hartley (1959). "Recursive functions over well ordered partial orderings". Proc. Amer. Math. Soc. 10 (6): 847–853. doi:10.1090/s0002-9939-1959-0111685-8. MR 0111685.
- Kreider, Donald L.; Rogers, Hartley (1961). "Constructive versions of ordinal number classes". Trans. Amer. Math. Soc. 100 (2): 325–369. doi:10.1090/s0002-9947-1961-0151396-x. MR 0151396.
- Rogers, Hartley (1965). "On universal functions". Proc. Amer. Math. Soc. 16: 39–44. doi:10.1090/s0002-9939-1965-0171705-4. MR 0171705.
- Hartley Rogers Jr., The Theory of Recursive Functions and Effective Computability, MIT Press, ISBN 0-262-68052-1 (paperback), ISBN 0-07-053522-1 (textbook)
