= Gile Mountain =

Mountain in Vermont, United States

Highest point
- Elevation: 1,873 ft (571 m) NAVD 88
- Coordinates: 43°47′20.5″N 72°21′05.5″W

Geography
- Location: Windsor County, Vermont, U.S.
- Topo map: USGS South Strafford

Climbing
- Easiest route: Hike

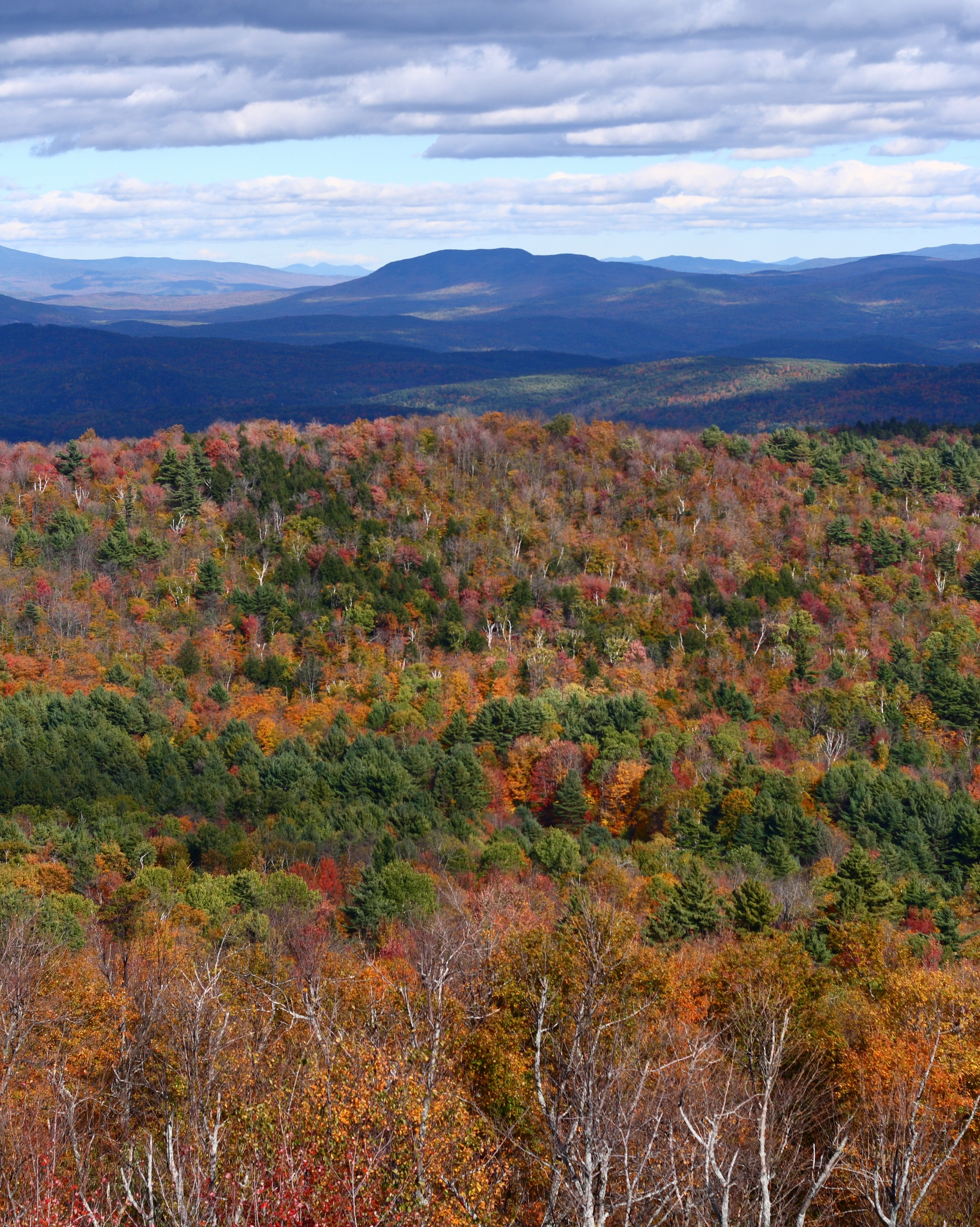
A view of Vermont's autumn foliage from the Gile Mountain fire tower

Gile Mountain in Windsor County, Vermont, sits along the border between the towns of Norwich and Sharon; its summit is in Norwich. The mountain reaches a height of 1,873 ft (571 m) above sea level. Relatively unimposing considering its height, the true summit cannot easily be seen from the surrounding territory, despite the prominent fire tower atop its summit. The tower is easily reached by taking Turnpike Road from Norwich to the parking area near its terminus. From there, the Gile Mountain trail leads west 0.7 miles (1.1 km) to the summit, passing under power lines. The summit area contains an old ranger cabin, since converted to a shelter-type structure (though camping is not allowed), and the tower itself. From the top views are expansive, and on a clear day one can see Mount Ascutney to the south, the Green Mountains from Killington Peak to Mount Mansfield to the west, Mount Cardigan, Smarts Mountain, and Croydon Peak to the east, and Mount Cube and Mount Moosilauke to the northeast with many of the White Mountains beyond. Dartmouth College is also visible, about 7 miles (11 km) distant.

== Geology ==
Gile Mountain is the type locality for the Devonian Gile Mountain Formation—interbedded quartzite and schist—which can be seen throughout northeastern Vermont.
