= Root School =

- U.S. National Register of Historic Places
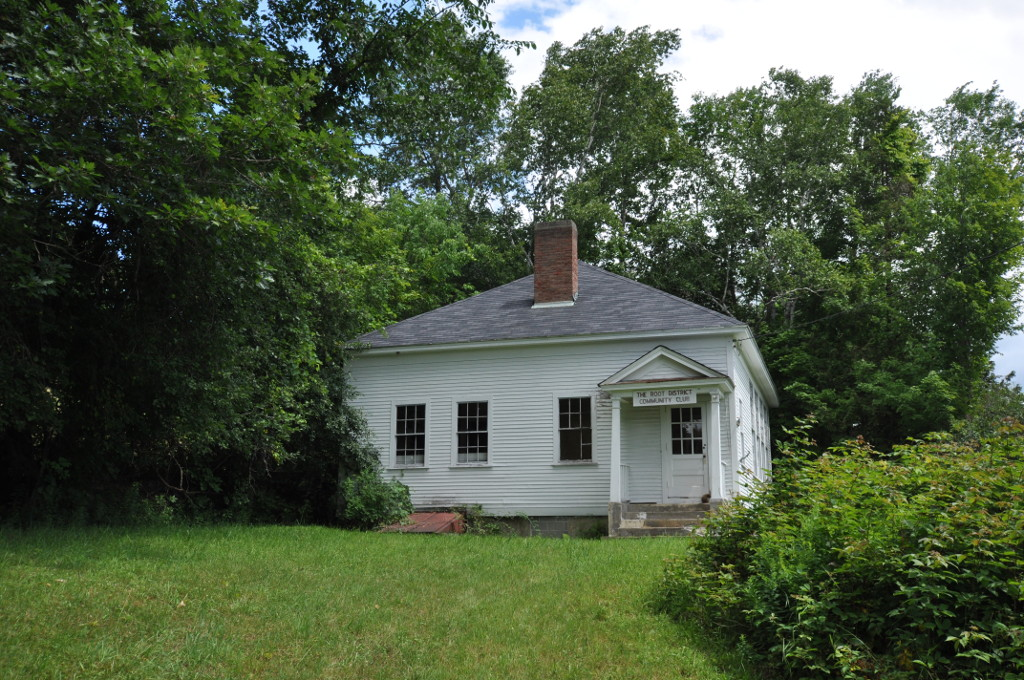

- Location within Vermont Location within the United States
- Location: 987 Union Village Rd., Norwich, Vermont
- Coordinates: 43°45′22″N 72°16′37″W
- Area: less than one acre
- Built: 1937
- Architectural style: Colonial Revival
- NRHP reference No.: 13000375
- Added to NRHP: June 10, 2013

The Root School is a historic school building at 987 Union Village Road in Norwich, Vermont, United States. Built in 1937, it is a rare late example of a one-room schoolhouse, made further distinctive by the survival of its original schoolroom interior. The building was listed on the National Register of Historic Places in 2013.

== Description and history ==
The Root School stands in a rural setting in eastern Norwich, on the north side of Union Village Road, a short way east of its junction with Goodrich Four Corners Road and Pattell Road. It is a single-story wood-frame structure, with a hip roof, clapboard siding, and a foundation of concrete blocks and poured concrete. The main entrance is in the western facade, facing the small parking area, and is sheltered by a gabled porch. Sash windows line the western and southern facades. The interior has a narrow vestibule, which opens into the main chamber. It has a stage at one end, and retains original wood flooring, wainscoting, and a woodstove with an unusual safety enclosure. The stage is effectively recessed between a small kitchen (formerly a cloakroam) on one side, and bathrooms on the other.

The school was built in 1937, a fairly late period for the construction of these types of district school buildings. It was used until 1946 for educational purposes, and has been used since then by a variety of community organizations, most recently as a community clubhouse. It is unusual among one-room schoolhouses for retaining most of its original interior, which is often lost when such buildings are converted to other uses. This school, along with the Beaver Meadow School, was among the last of the town's district schools to close.

== See also ==
- National Register of Historic Places listings in Windsor County, Vermont
