= Lebanon High School (New Hampshire) =

Location
- 195 Hanover Street; Lebanon, New Hampshire; United States; 43°39′11″N 72°14′58″W

Information
- Type: Public
- Established: 1922
- Principal: Ian Smith
- Teaching staff: 52.00 (FTE)
- Enrollment: 609 (2023-2024)
- Student to teacher ratio: 11.71
- Colors: Maroon and White
- Mascot: The Raider Bird
- Rival: Hanover
- Website: lhs.sau88.net

Lebanon High School is the sole high school in the Lebanon School District (SAU 88) in New Hampshire. Ranging from grades 9–12, students are from the city of Lebanon and the towns of Grantham, Plainfield and Cornish.

The mascot for the LHS Raiders is commonly called the "Raider Bird."

== History ==
In the early 1950s, SAU 88 decided to build a new high school for all students in Lebanon. Prior to this decision, students in Lebanon attended high school at what was later the junior high school and is now a luxury apartment building, while West Lebanon high schoolers went to Seminary Hill School in that village. In 195- the high school was completed, and in 195- the first class was graduated.

Over the next 20 years, 9th graders in the district would attend the junior high school instead of the high school. In 197- this changed as the first true freshman class entered the school.

LHS's first mascot was the Agamek Indian. After complaints in 2001, however, this mascot was replaced with the Raider. After three years, the new mascot was again changed to today's raider bird, fondly referred to as a "fawk" (from "falcon hawk"). The LHS Alumni Association still uses the Agamek as its mascot.

== Curriculum and academics ==
Lebanon offers a variety of classes including Honors and AP courses for all grades.

A class unique to Lebanon is "Teen Roles". This class is designed as a health class, but includes topics such as team building, CPR lessons, and how to respond and react to different high school issues. As part of the class, the students use an outdoor ropes course in which they learn about trust, support, and dependence on one another. It is also an opportunity to experience new things. Activities include being attached to a bungee cord that supports a student's weight and jumping from a ledge in a tree 10 feet out to a hanging bar. Besides Hanover High School, Lebanon is the only school in New Hampshire with a full outdoor ropes course.

Another unique course at Lebanon is Take Flight, were students have the opportunity to build a plane. The program is done in partnership with Tango Flight, based in Texas. Lebanon High school is among 3 schools in New Hampshire that have a plane-build program. The class teaches many important skills, including many aircraft mechanic skills, as well as much less specific skills such as teamwork, project planning, and others. Tango Flight, based in Texas has many schools across the country.

== Rival ==
Lebanon's long-time rival is Hanover High School, in the neighboring town.

== Athletics ==
Lebanon is well known for their flourishing indoor and outdoor track teams, coached by alum Kevin Lozeau. During the 2010–2011 indoor track season, Lebanon girls won the Class I, M, & S track state championships, and the boys came in fifth.

In 2010 the Lebanon varsity football team went undefeated for its first time ever since they left the CVL (Connecticut Valley League) and won the Division IV State Championship.

During the 2010 season, the girls' varsity soccer team won the state championships, and in 2011 the boys were the runners-up.

The Lebanon girls basketball team, which was coached by teacher Tim Kehoe, held a 30+ year quarterfinals streak in the state playoffs. They won the state championship in 2007 and finished off an undefeated season in 2012/13 by defeating Portsmouth in the finals, and made the state championship, but lost the game, in both the 2009–2010 and 2010–2011 seasons.

The Lebanon boys basketball team also has a long record of success. Coached for years by coach Lang Metcalf, former coach Keith Matte took the Raiders to the state semi-finals in 2012/13 where they lost to Souhegan High School. Lebanon boys basketball went to the Final Four in the state for five straight years, 2012–2016, with one undefeated regular season and one state championship.

Fall sports available include:

- Soccer (boys and girls)
- Field hockey (girls)
- Football (boys and available to girls)
- Cross-country running (girls and boys)
- Cheerleading (co-ed)

Winter sports available include:

- Indoor track (boys and girls)
- Nordic skiing (boys and girls)
- Alpine skiing (boys and girls)
- Basketball (boys and girls)
- Ice hockey (boys and girls)
- Cheerleading (co-ed)

Spring sports available include:

- Outdoor track (boys and girls)
- Tennis (boys and girls)
- Softball (girls)
- Baseball (boys)
- Lacrosse (boys and girls)

== Clubs and Co-Curriculars ==
The high school offers many clubs including (as of October 2025):

A Capella
Art Club
Badminton Club
Jazz Band
Pep Band
Book Club
Chorus
Chess Club
Diversity and Inclusion
GLoW (Gay, Lesbian or Whomever) Club
Drama/Musical (also known as the Wet Paint Players)
Dungeons and Dragons
French Language
French Honor Society
Game Club
Genlynk Club
Interact
Jazz Band
LHS Times Newspaper
Literary Magazine
Math team (Junior and Senior teams)
Model United Nations
Musical/Drama: Wet Paint Players
National Honor Society
Philosophy Club
Raider Radio
School Council
Science Honor Society
Science Olympiad
Spanish Honor Society
Students for a Sustainable Future
Superlatives
Code Club (Technology)
Ultimate Frisbee
Volleyball
Yearbook
Young Progressive Activists
Youth in Action
