= Route 10A (Vermont–New Hampshire) =

Highway in Vermont and New Hampshire

Route 10A
- Route 10A highlighted in red

Route information
- Maintained by VTrans and NHDOT
- Length: 1.070 mi (1.722 km) Vermont: 0.522 mi (0.840 km); New Hampshire: 0.548 mi (0.882 km)

Major junctions
- West end: I-91 / US 5 near Norwich, VT
- East end: NH 10 in Hanover, NH

Location
- Country: United States
- State: New Hampshire

Highway system
- New Hampshire Highway System; Interstate; US; State; Turnpikes
- State highways in Vermont
← NH 10	NH	→ NH 11
← VT 10	VT	→ VT 11

Route 10A is a 1.070-mile-long (1.722 km) east-west highway connecting the towns of Norwich, Vermont and Hanover, New Hampshire. The route exists as Vermont Route 10A and New Hampshire Route 10A, with each designation carrying about half of the route's length. The route begins in Norwich at an interchange with Interstate 91 and U.S. Route 5 and runs east, crossing the state line and continuing into downtown Hanover, where it ends at New Hampshire Route 10.

Route 10A is a spur route of New Hampshire Route 10 and its extension in Vermont is unrelated to Vermont Route 10.

== Route description ==
VT 10A begins at the exit 13 interchange where I-91 and US 5 meet south of the town of Norwich. From this interchange, it heads east towards the Connecticut River for 0.52 miles (0.84 km). It crosses the Ledyard Bridge over the river and enters Hanover, New Hampshire where it becomes NH 10A (West Wheelock Street). NH 10A continues east for 0.54 miles (0.87 km) before ending at NH 10 in downtown Hanover near Dartmouth College.

NH 10A is the shortest state highway in New Hampshire.

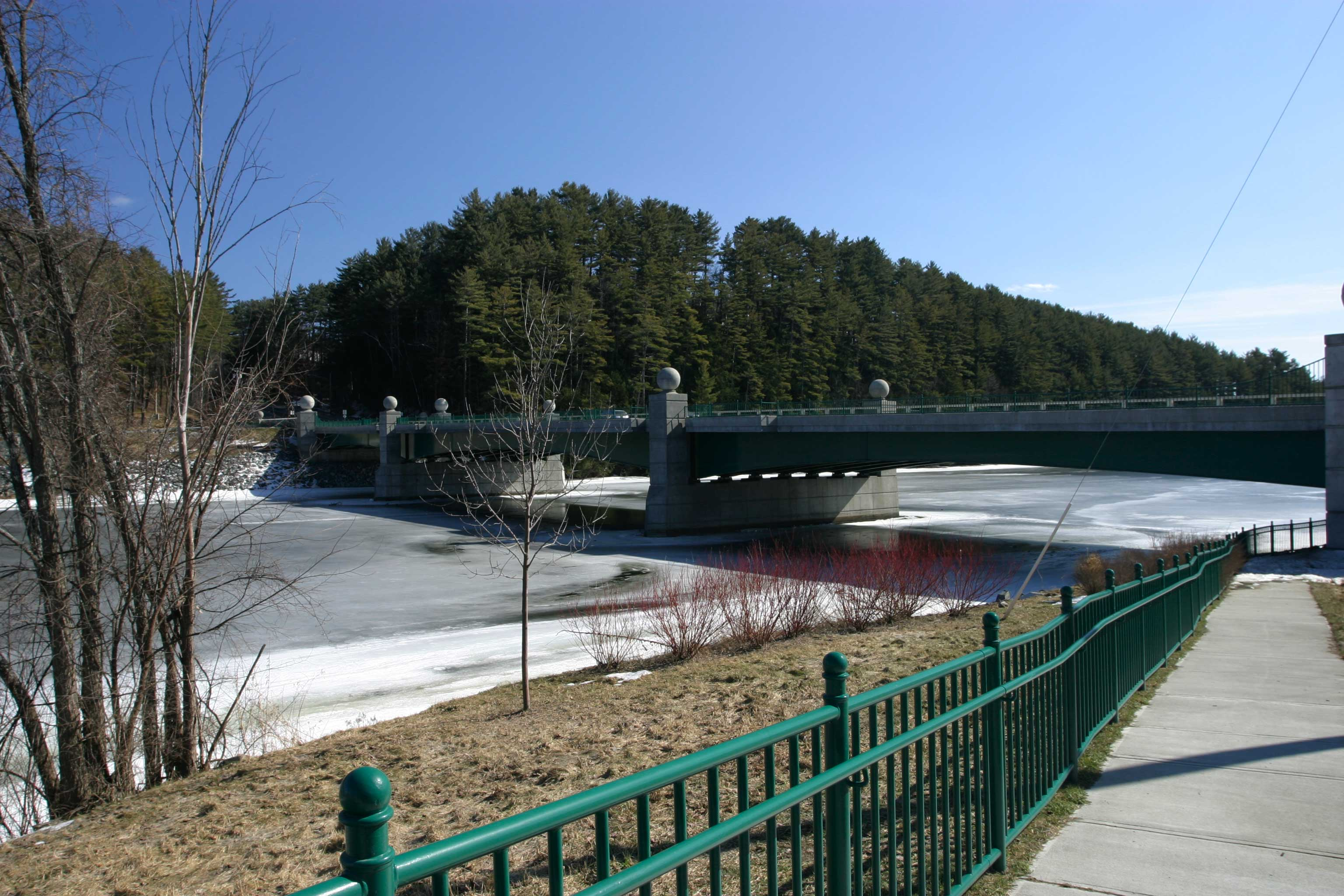
Route 10A crosses the Connecticut River over the Ledyard Bridge.

== Major intersections ==
State	County	Location	mi	km	Destinations	Notes
Vermont	Windsor	Norwich	0.000	0.000	I-91 south – Wilder, White River Junction; US 5 – Norwich, White River Junction	Western terminus; exit 13 on I-91
Vermont	Windsor	Norwich	0.210	0.338	I-91 north – Thetford, St. Johnsbury	Western terminus; exit 13 on I-91
Vermont	Windsor	Norwich	0.484	0.779	River Road ( VT 9540)	Southern terminus of unsigned VT 9540
Connecticut River			0.522 0.000	0.840 0.000	Ledyard Bridge; Vermont–New Hampshire state line	
New Hampshire	Grafton	Hanover	0.548	0.882	NH 10 (Main Street)	Eastern terminus
1.000 mi = 1.609 km; 1.000 km = 0.621 mi
