= Hanover, New Hampshire =

Town in the United States

- Town
- Hanover, New Hampshire, from the southwest

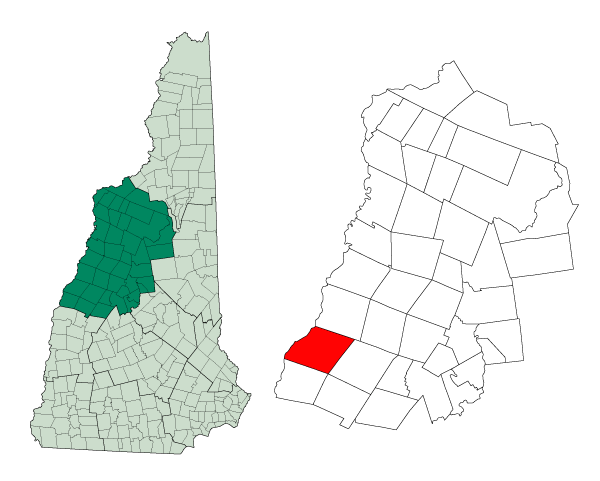
- Location in Grafton County, New Hampshire
- Interactive map of Hanover, New Hampshire
- Coordinates: 43°42′56″N 72°11′28″W
- Country: United States
- State: New Hampshire
- County: Grafton
- Incorporated: 1761
- Villages: Hanover; Etna; Hanover Center

Area
  - Total: 50.2 sq mi (129.9 km^{2})
  - Land: 49.0 sq mi (127.0 km^{2})
  - Water: 1.1 sq mi (2.9 km^{2}) 2.21%
- Elevation: 1,096 ft (334 m)

Population (2020)
  - Total: 11,870
  - Density: 242/sq mi (93.5/km^{2})
- Time zone: UTC−5 (Eastern)
  - Summer (DST): UTC−4 (Eastern)
- ZIP Codes: 03755 (Hanover); 03750 (Etna); 03748 (Enfield)
- Area code: 603
- FIPS code: 33-33860
- GNIS feature ID: 873619
- Website: www.hanovernh.org

Hanover is a town located along the Connecticut River in Grafton County, New Hampshire, United States. As of the 2020 census, its population was 11,870. The town is home to the Ivy League university Dartmouth College, the U.S. Army Corps of Engineers Cold Regions Research and Engineering Laboratory, and Hanover High School. The Appalachian Trail crosses the town, connecting with a number of trails and nature preserves.

Most of the population resides in the Hanover census-designated place (CDP)—the main village of the town. Located at the junctions of New Hampshire routes 10, 10A, and 120, the Hanover CDP recorded a population of 9,078 people at the 2020 census. The town is part of the Lebanon–Claremont micropolitan area and also contains the smaller villages of Etna and Hanover Center.

== Etymology ==
"Hannover" (with a double n, as it was spelled in the 1761 charter and in its German original form as well) was named either after a local parish in Sprague, Connecticut, or after the German House of Hanover (which originated in 1635 as a cadet branch of the House of Brunswick-Lüneburg when George, Duke of Brunswick moved to the city of Hannover) in honor of the reigning British-Hanoverian king, George III. Today, the original Hannover is the capital and largest city of Lower Saxony, the second-largest state in Germany. The name of the German city is thought to derive from the Low German form of what is "hohes Ufer" in German, which translates into "high shore" in English, and describes the high shore of the Leine river at the site, and at the time, of the first known settlement (near today's street At the High Shore).

While it is likely that the name "Dresden" derived from Dresden in Germany, it has also been suggested that it could derive directly from the old Sorbian word drezg ("forest") or Drezd'ane, for an inhabitant of a forest.

== History ==
Hanover was chartered by Governor Benning Wentworth on July 4, 1761, and in 1765–1766 its first European inhabitants arrived, the majority from Connecticut. Although the surface is uneven, the town developed into an agricultural community. Dartmouth College was established in 1769 beside the town common at a village called "the Plain"—an extensive and level tract of land a mile (1.6 kilometers) from the Connecticut River, and about 150 feet (46 m) above it.

At one point in its history, the southwest corner of Hanover, site of "The Plain", was known as "Dresden", which in the 1780s joined other disgruntled New Hampshire towns along the Connecticut River that briefly defected to what was then the independent Vermont Republic. After various political posturings, however, the towns returned to New Hampshire at the heated insistence of George Washington. One remnant of this era is that the name "Dresden" is still used in the Dresden School District, an interstate school district serving both Hanover and Norwich, Vermont—the first and one of the few interstate school districts in the nation.

The film Winter Carnival (1939) was shot in Hanover.

== Geography ==
According to the United States Census Bureau, the town has a total area of 50.2 square miles (129.9 km^{2}), of which 49.0 square miles (127.0 km^{2}) are land and 1.1 square miles (2.9 km^{2}) are water, comprising 2.21% of the town. The primary settlement in Hanover, where over 75% of the town's population resides, is in the southwestern corner of the town and is defined as the Hanover census-designated place (CDP). It contains the areas around Dartmouth College and the intersections of New Hampshire Routes 10, 10A, and 120. The CDP has a total area of 5.0 square miles (13 km^{2}), of which 4.6 square miles (12 km^{2}) are land and 0.4 square miles (1.0 km^{2}) are water.

Hanover borders the towns of Lyme, Canaan, and Enfield in New Hampshire; the town of Norwich, Vermont; and the city of Lebanon, New Hampshire. Inside the limits of Hanover are the small rural villages of Etna and Hanover Center.

The highest point in Hanover is the north peak of Moose Mountain, at 2,313 feet (705 m) above sea level. Hanover lies fully within the Connecticut River watershed.

There are a number of trails and nature preserves in Hanover, and the majority of these trails are suitable for snowshoes and cross-country skis. The Velvet Rocks Trail, located on the Appalachian Trail, has a number of rock climbing and bouldering spots.

=== Climate ===
According to the Köppen Climate Classification system, Hanover has a hot-summer humid continental climate, abbreviated "Dfa" on climate maps. The hottest temperature recorded in Hanover was 103 °F (39.4 °C) on August 2, 1975, while the coldest temperature recorded was −40 °F (−40.0 °C) on February 16, 1943.

Climate data for Hanover, New Hampshire, 1991–2020 normals, extremes 1893–present
Month	Jan	Feb	Mar	Apr	May	Jun	Jul	Aug	Sep	Oct	Nov	Dec	Year
Record high °F (°C)	64 (18)	66 (19)	86 (30)	93 (34)	96 (36)	98 (37)	101 (38)	103 (39)	97 (36)	87 (31)	79 (26)	76 (24)	103 (39)
Mean maximum °F (°C)	49.4 (9.7)	52.4 (11.3)	62.5 (16.9)	79.5 (26.4)	87.6 (30.9)	91.4 (33.0)	92.3 (33.5)	90.4 (32.4)	87.0 (30.6)	76.5 (24.7)	65.6 (18.7)	52.4 (11.3)	94.2 (34.6)
Mean daily maximum °F (°C)	30.3 (−0.9)	34.3 (1.3)	43.7 (6.5)	58.1 (14.5)	70.9 (21.6)	78.8 (26.0)	83.4 (28.6)	81.6 (27.6)	73.8 (23.2)	60.2 (15.7)	47.2 (8.4)	35.6 (2.0)	58.2 (14.5)
Daily mean °F (°C)	21.6 (−5.8)	24.3 (−4.3)	33.6 (0.9)	46.5 (8.1)	58.5 (14.7)	67.1 (19.5)	72.1 (22.3)	70.5 (21.4)	62.9 (17.2)	50.2 (10.1)	38.9 (3.8)	28.0 (−2.2)	47.8 (8.8)
Mean daily minimum °F (°C)	13.0 (−10.6)	14.4 (−9.8)	23.6 (−4.7)	34.8 (1.6)	46.2 (7.9)	55.4 (13.0)	60.9 (16.1)	59.3 (15.2)	52.1 (11.2)	40.2 (4.6)	30.7 (−0.7)	20.4 (−6.4)	37.6 (3.1)
Mean minimum °F (°C)	−11.8 (−24.3)	−9.0 (−22.8)	0.1 (−17.7)	21.0 (−6.1)	30.8 (−0.7)	41.7 (5.4)	49.4 (9.7)	47.5 (8.6)	36.2 (2.3)	25.3 (−3.7)	13.9 (−10.1)	−1.6 (−18.7)	−15.3 (−26.3)
Record low °F (°C)	−34 (−37)	−40 (−40)	−22 (−30)	0 (−18)	20 (−7)	29 (−2)	38 (3)	33 (1)	22 (−6)	11 (−12)	−12 (−24)	−37 (−38)	−40 (−40)
Average precipitation inches (mm)	2.73 (69)	2.38 (60)	2.96 (75)	3.24 (82)	3.34 (85)	3.70 (94)	4.48 (114)	3.55 (90)	3.33 (85)	4.00 (102)	3.00 (76)	3.44 (87)	40.15 (1,019)
Average snowfall inches (cm)	16.4 (42)	13.1 (33)	13.5 (34)	1.9 (4.8)	0.0 (0.0)	0.0 (0.0)	0.0 (0.0)	0.0 (0.0)	0.0 (0.0)	0.1 (0.25)	2.2 (5.6)	13.4 (34)	60.6 (153.65)
Average extreme snow depth inches (cm)	12.0 (30)	15.3 (39)	13.2 (34)	3.3 (8.4)	0.0 (0.0)	0.0 (0.0)	0.0 (0.0)	0.0 (0.0)	0.0 (0.0)	0.2 (0.51)	1.6 (4.1)	8.3 (21)	17.8 (45)
Average precipitation days (≥ 0.01 in)	10.8	8.9	9.7	10.7	11.7	12.1	12.6	10.7	11.3	12.2	10.2	10.7	131.6
Average snowy days (≥ 0.1 in)	8.3	6.5	4.0	1.1	0.0	0.0	0.0	0.0	0.0	0.1	1.6	6.1	27.7
Source 1: NOAA
Source 2: National Weather Service

== Demographics ==
Historical population
Census	Pop.	Note	%±
1790	1,380		—
1800	1,912		38.6%
1810	2,135		11.7%
1820	2,222		4.1%
1830	2,361		6.3%
1840	2,613		10.7%
1850	2,350		−10.1%
1860	2,308		−1.8%
1870	2,085		−9.7%
1880	2,147		3.0%
1890	1,817		−15.4%
1900	1,884		3.7%
1910	2,075		10.1%
1920	2,264		9.1%
1930	3,043		34.4%
1940	3,425		12.6%
1950	6,259		82.7%
1960	7,329		17.1%
1970	8,494		15.9%
1980	9,119		7.4%
1990	9,212		1.0%
2000	10,850		17.8%
2010	11,260		3.8%
2020	11,870		5.4%
U.S. Decennial Census

As of the census of 2010, there were 11,260 people, 3,119 households, and 1,797 families residing in the town. The population density was 220 people per square mile (85 people/km^{2}). There were 3,278 housing units at an average density of 65.2 per square mile (25.2/km^{2}). The racial makeup of the town was 81.0% White, 3.4% Black, 0.8% Native American, 10.8% Asian, 0.03% Pacific Islander, 0.7% from other races, and 3.2% from two or more races. Hispanic or Latino of any race were 3.9% of the population.

There were 3,119 households, out of which 27.4% had children under the age of 18 living with them, 51.5% were married couples living together, 4.7% had a female householder with no husband present, and 42.4% were non-families. 31.0% of all households were made up of individuals, and 16.1% had someone living alone who was 65 years of age or older. The average household size was 2.37 and the average family size was 2.95.

In the town, the population was spread out, with 27.8% at or under the age of 19, 25.5% from 20 to 24, 14.4% from 25 to 44, 18.6% from 45 to 64, and 13.7% who were 65 years of age or older. The median age was 23 years.

For the period 2010–2014, the estimated median income for a household in the town was $94,063, and the median income for a family was $129,000. Male full-time workers had a median income of $87,550 versus $53,141 for females. The per capita income for the town was $34,140. About 2.0% of families and 12.0% of the population were below the poverty line, including 3.4% of those under age 18 and 4.8% of those age 65 or over.

== Government ==
Hanover town vote by party in presidential elections
Year	GOP	DEM	Others
2024	13.98% 995	84.97% 6,049	1.05% 75
2020	11.8% 841	87.3% 6,210	0.93% 66
2016	11.94% 926	84.63% 6,561	3.43% 266
2012	23.67% 1,727	74.97% 5,469	1.36% 99
2008	17.67% 1,328	81.69% 6,140	0.64% 48
2004	21.70% 1,444	77.42% 5,152	0.89% 59
2000	29.56% 1,541	65.05% 3,391	5.39% 281
1996	31.71% 1,424	63.16% 2,836	5.12% 230
1992	25.91% 1,201	62.70% 2,906	11.39% 528
1988	40.33% 1,472	58.96% 2,152	0.71% 26
1984	44.17% 1,501	55.50% 1,886	0.33% 11
1980	33.15% 1,108	34.20% 1,143	32.65% 1,091
1976	46.17% 1,483	50.25% 1,614	3.58% 115
1972	39.88% 1,377	59.75% 2,063	0.38% 13

In the New Hampshire Senate, Hanover is included in the 5th District and is represented by Democrat Suzanne Prentiss. On the New Hampshire Executive Council, Hanover is in the 1st District and is represented by Republican Joseph Kenney. In the United States House of Representatives, Hanover is a part of New Hampshire's 2nd congressional district and is currently represented by Democrat Maggie Goodlander.

No Republican presidential nominee has received over 40 percent of the vote in the town since George H. W. Bush in 1988.

== Education ==
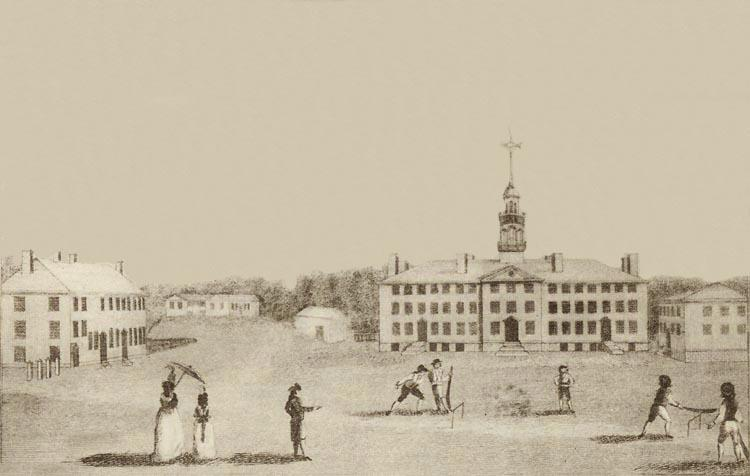
Students playing cricket at Dartmouth College in 1793

=== Public schools ===
- Hanover High School
- Frances C. Richmond Middle School
- Bernice A. Ray Elementary School

=== Universities ===
- Dartmouth College

=== Private schools ===
- The Clark School was at one time located in Hanover but merged with Cardigan Mountain School in the nearby town of Canaan in 1953.

== Economy ==
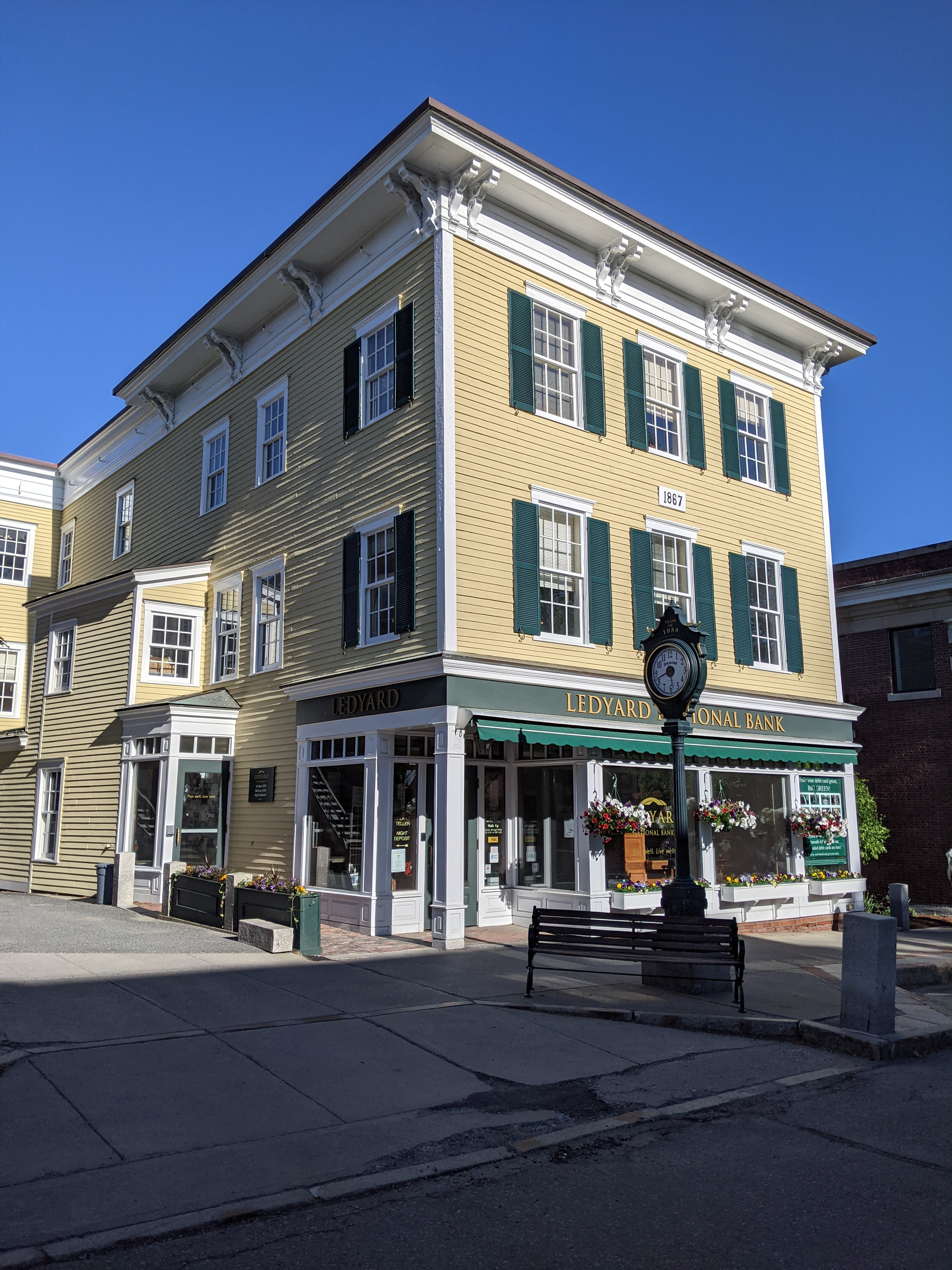
Ledyard National Bank on Main Street

Hypertherm, White Mountains Insurance Group, and Daat Research Corp. are based in Hanover.

== Infrastructure ==
=== Water ===
The Hanover Water Company supplies water for downtown Hanover from several local reservoirs. The company is owned by Dartmouth College (52.8%) and the Town of Hanover (47.2%), with management by the Town of Hanover under a contract. In 2000, all full-time company employees became town employees. In recent years, the town has spent over $20 million to upgrade main water lines, and will undergo another $6 million project to build a new water treatment plant. Outside the downtown area, residents rely on private wells that are not maintained by the town.

=== Other utilities ===
FairPoint Communications furnishes telephone communication. The municipality provides sewage treatment.

== Plaudits ==
CNN and Money magazine rated Hanover the sixth best place to live in America in 2011, and the second best in 2007. "This Just Might Be the Best College Town," read the headline of a story in the January–February 2017 issue of Yankee.
