= Norwich, Vermont =

- Town
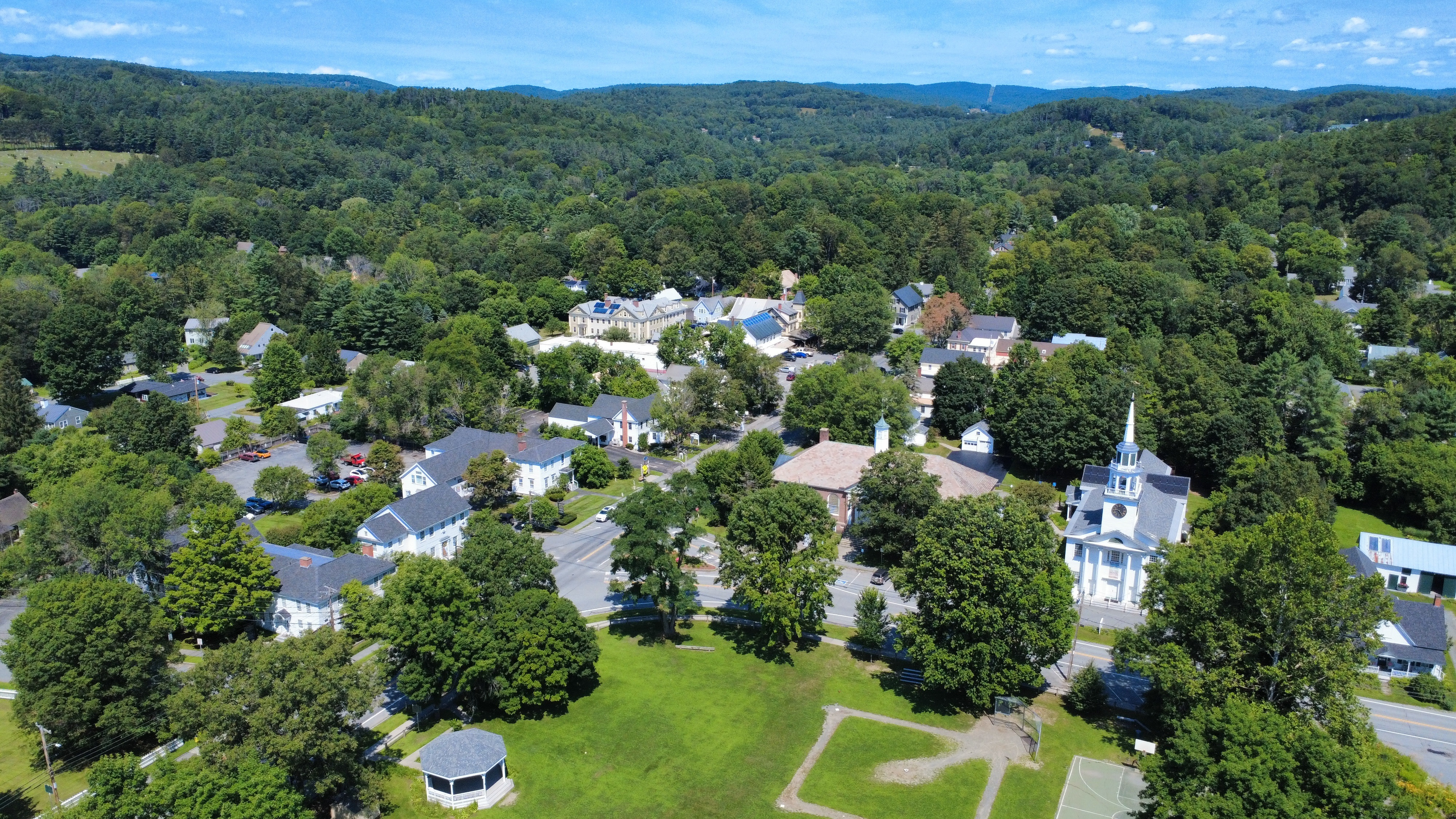
- Norwich, viewed from the south

- Seal

- Location in Windsor County and the state of Vermont.
- Coordinates: 43°44′48″N 72°19′08″W
- Country: United States
- State: Vermont
- County: Windsor
- Chartered: 1761
- Communities: Norwich; Bragg; Goodrich Four Corners; Lewiston; New Boston; Pompanoosuc; West Norwich

Area
  - Total: 44.7 sq mi (115.7 km^{2})
  - Land: 44.4 sq mi (115.1 km^{2})
  - Water: 0.23 sq mi (0.6 km^{2})
- Elevation: 1,073 ft (327 m)

Population (2020)
  - Total: 3,612
  - Density: 81.28/sq mi (31.38/km^{2})
- Time zone: UTC−5 (EST)
  - Summer (DST): UTC−4 (EDT)
- ZIP Codes: 05055 (Norwich); 05001 (White River Junction)
- Area code: 802
- FIPS code: 50-52900
- GNIS feature ID: 1462166
- Website: www.norwich.vt.us

Norwich is a town in Windsor County, Vermont, United States. The population was 3,612 at the 2020 census. The municipality is a commuter town for nearby Hanover, New Hampshire across the Connecticut River. The town is part of the Dresden School District, the first interstate school district in the United States, signed into law by President John F. Kennedy. The town contains the Norwich Mid-Century Modern Historic District.

== History ==
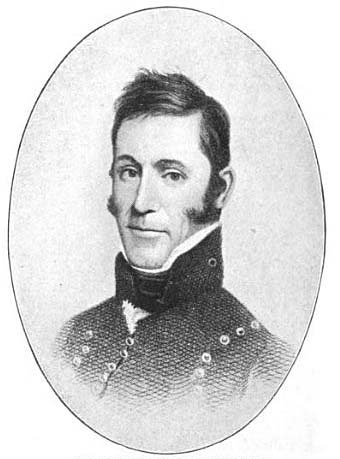
Alden Partridge, c. 1817

The boundaries of Norwich were established on July 4, 1761, when Governor Benning Wentworth of New Hampshire defined the boundaries of townships in Vermont. The first settlers reached the area in 1763 and began to clear the wilderness and erect the first hand-hewn log buildings, wintering over for the first time in 1765. Early settlements occurred along the Ompompanoosuc River. Later, the current village site became settled. The first town meeting occurred in April 1768. The first Congregational church was founded in 1770 and a structure built in 1778. The population grew from 206 in 1771 to 1,158 in 1791 and 2,316 in 1830.

The town was named after Norwich, Connecticut, the state from which the first settlers originated. In the original charter, the name was spelled "Norwhich", but the additional 'h' was dropped shortly after the town was chartered. Originally pronounced "Norritch" (similar to the English pronunciation of the city of Norwich, England), the town name has in more recent times become more commonly pronounced "Nor-wich".

=== Alden Partridge and the founding of Norwich University ===
In 1819 native son, Alden Partridge, a former Superintendent of the United States Military Academy at West Point, New York, founded the private "American Literary, Scientific and Military Academy" in Norwich. He hoped to establish a new "American system" for training cadets that included both humanities and science topics in the curriculum, in addition to military science. In his six years of Norwich residency, Partridge achieved an academy population of nearly 500 "cadets". He moved that school back to Middletown, Connecticut, in 1825, but returned in 1835 with a charter from the U.S. Congress to found another military academy, which remained in Norwich until 1866, when it burned to the ground. The school then relocated to Northfield, Vermont, where it exists today as Norwich University.

== Geography ==
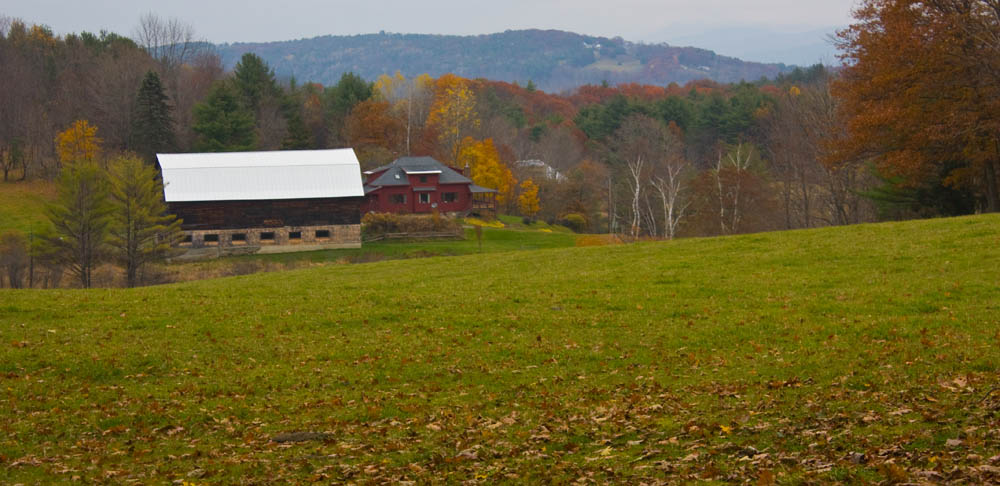
Norwich pastureland in late October

Norwich lies on the western bank of the Connecticut River, which forms Vermont's boundary with New Hampshire, opposite its companion town, Hanover, New Hampshire. The Ledyard Bridge connects the two towns. The Vermont towns bordering Norwich are Thetford to the north, Sharon to the west, and Hartford to the south.

According to the United States Census Bureau, the town has a total area of 44.7 square miles (115.7 km^{2}), of which 44.4 square miles (115.1 km^{2}) is land and 0.23 square miles (0.6 km^{2}), or 0.05%, is water. The Ompompanoosuc River flows into the Connecticut River in the northeastern part of the town.

The landscape is hilly and wooded. The elevation of the town center is 531 feet (162 m). The hills in the town include the 1,700-foot (520 m) Griggs Mountain in the southwestern section and the 1,853-foot (565 m) Gile Mountain in the northwestern section.

== Demographics ==
Historical population
Census	Pop.	Note	%±
1790	1,158		—
1800	1,486		28.3%
1810	1,812		21.9%
1820	1,985		9.5%
1830	2,316		16.7%
1840	2,218		−4.2%
1850	1,978		−10.8%
1860	1,759		−11.1%
1870	1,639		−6.8%
1880	1,471		−10.3%
1890	1,304		−11.4%
1900	1,303		−0.1%
1910	1,252		−3.9%
1920	1,092		−12.8%
1930	1,371		25.5%
1940	1,418		3.4%
1950	1,532		8.0%
1960	1,790		16.8%
1970	1,966		9.8%
1980	2,398		22.0%
1990	3,093		29.0%
2000	3,544		14.6%
2010	3,414		−3.7%
2020	3,612		5.8%
U.S. Decennial Census

As of the census of 2000, there were 3,544 people, 1,367 households, and 944 families residing in the town. The population density was 79.3 people per square mile (30.6 people/km^{2}). There were 1,505 housing units at an average density of 33.7 per square mile (13.0/km^{2}). The racial makeup of the town was 95.97% White, 0.48% African American, 0.20% Native American, 1.61% Asian, 0.03% Pacific Islander, 0.62% from other races, and 1.10% from two or more races. Hispanic or Latino people of any race were 0.79% of the population.

There were 1,367 households, out of which 41.1% had children under the age of 18 living with them, 58.1% were married couples living together, 8.7% had a female householder with no husband present, and 30.9% were non-families. 24.2% of all households were made up of individuals, and 8.6% had someone living alone who was 65 years of age or older. The average household size was 2.59 and the average family size was 3.10.

In the town, the population was spread out, with 29.3% under the age of 18, 4.9% from 18 to 24, 23.6% from 25 to 44, 31.3% from 45 to 64, and 11.0% who were 65 years of age or older. The median age was 41 years. For every 100 females, there were 95.7 males. For every 100 females age 18 and over, there were 90.1 males.

The median income for a household in the town was $66,000, and the median income for a family was $78,178. Males had a median income of $49,350 versus $33,871 for females. The per capita income for the town was $35,285. About 1.5% of families and 3.8% of the population were below the poverty line, including 1.1% of those under age 18 and 6.2% of those age 65 or over.

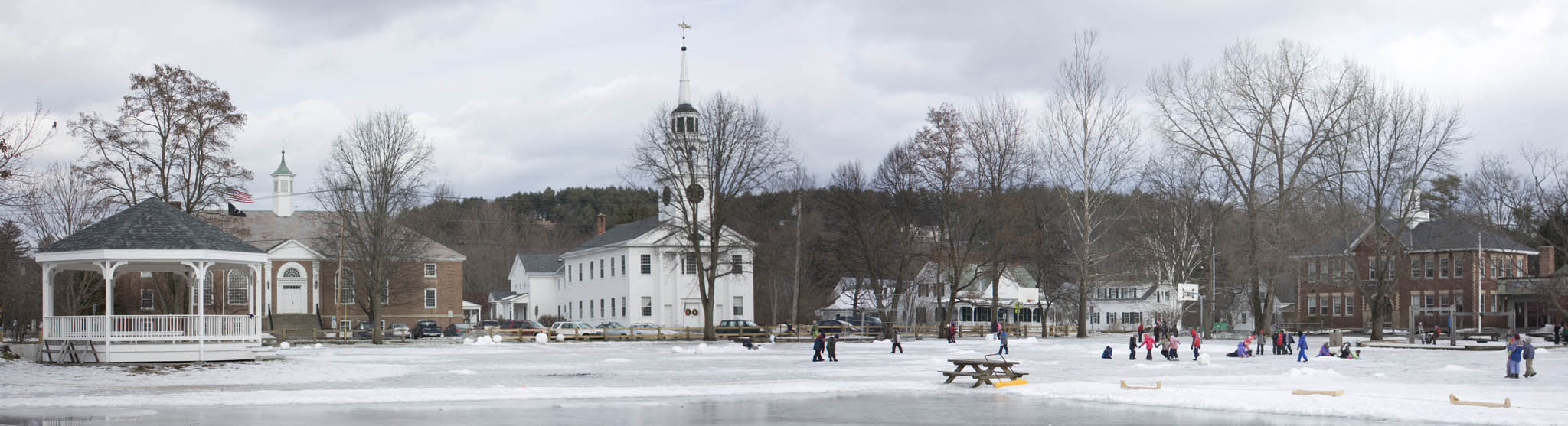
Norwich in winter. Left to right are: bandstand, Tracy Hall (town hall), Norwich Congregational Church, private residences, and the Marion Cross (elementary) School. In the foreground is a seasonal skating area.

== Commerce and culture ==
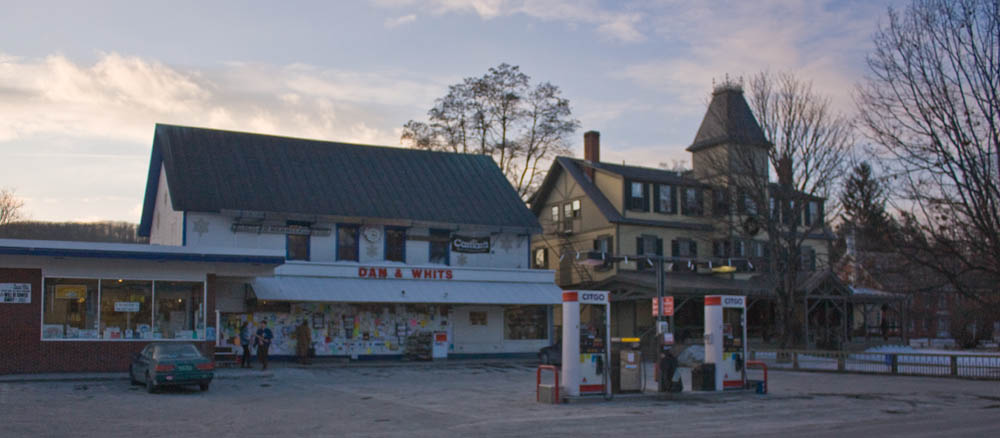
Norwich's general store (left) and inn (right)

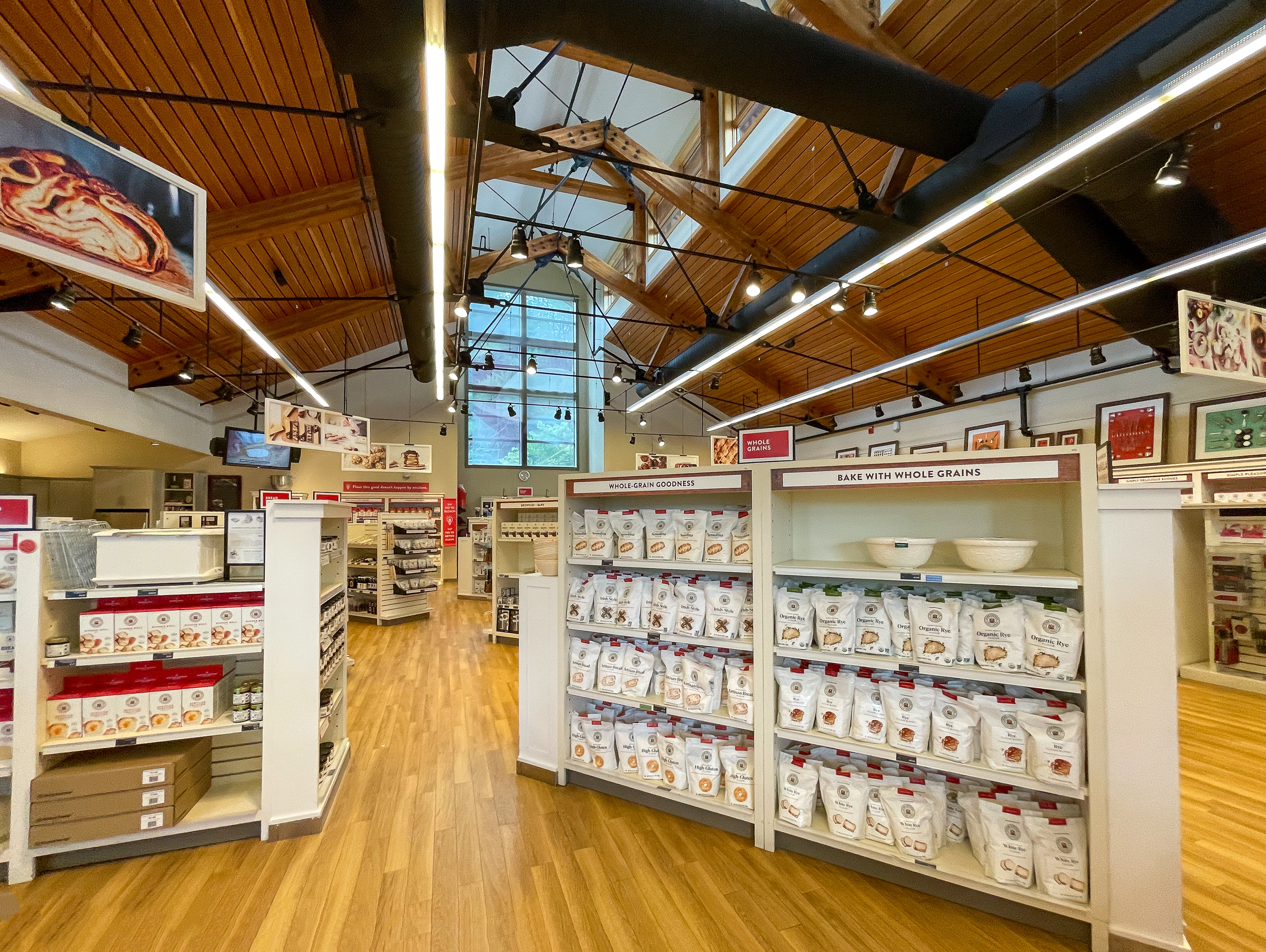
King Arthur Baking Company store

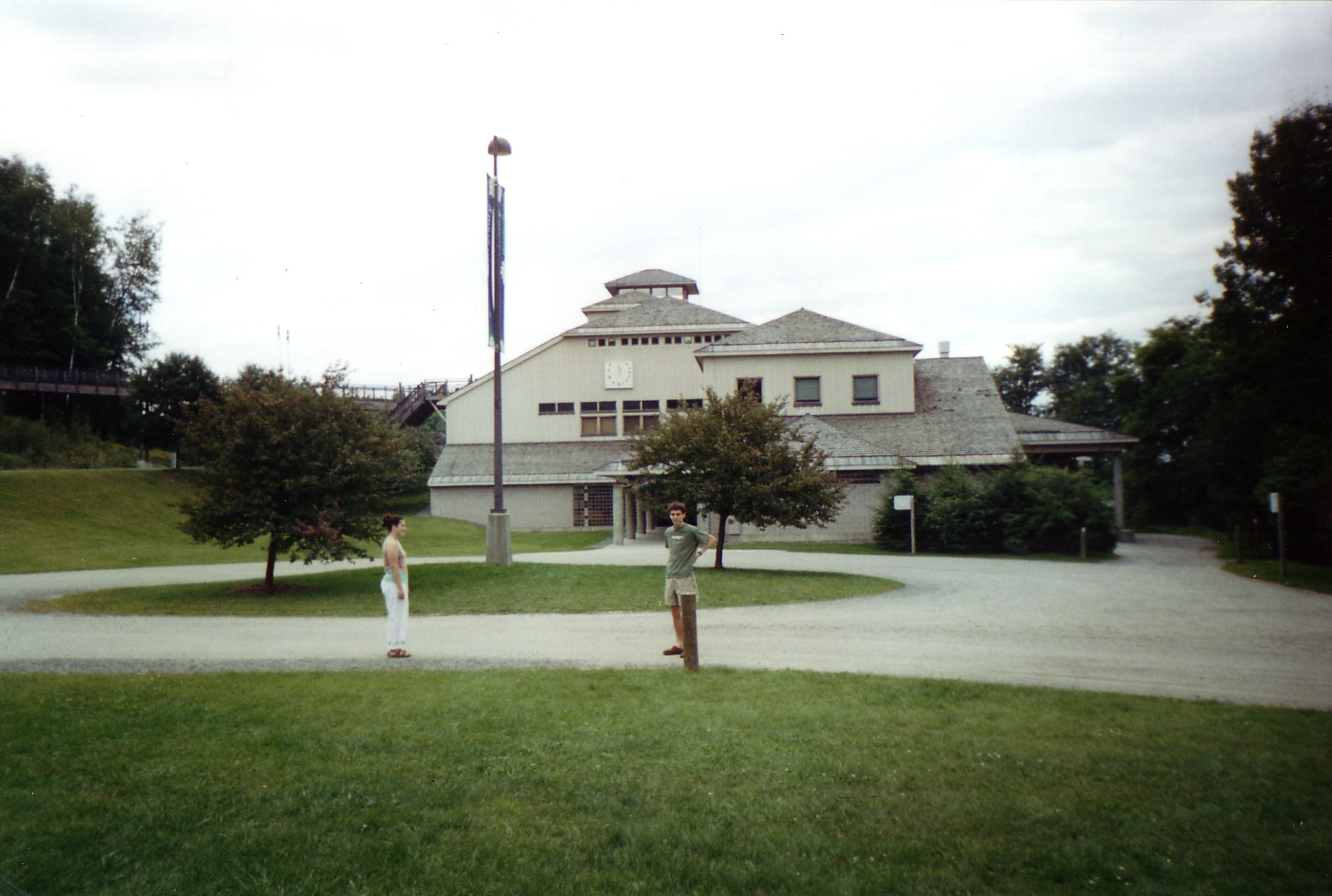
Montshire Museum of Science

The town commercial center features a traditional, but actively used, general store. Adjacent to the general store is a restored historic inn with a restaurant and brew pub. The Montshire Museum of Science and King Arthur Baking Company are located in Norwich.

== Education ==
Norwich maintains one of the few interstate public school systems, the Dresden School District, commissioned by President John F. Kennedy, which is shared by the towns of Norwich and Hanover, New Hampshire. Students attend Marion Cross School in Norwich for kindergarten through sixth grade, Richmond Middle School in Hanover for grades seven and eight, and Hanover High School in Hanover for grades nine through twelve.

== Transportation ==
Major transportation routes, which run parallel through the Connecticut River valley, include Interstate 91 (Exit 13 serves the town), U.S. Route 5 and the former Boston and Maine Railroad right of way, now owned by the State of Vermont. The Appalachian Trail passes south to east through the town from Hartford to Hanover, New Hampshire.

== Notable people ==
- Elizabeth Emerson Atwater, 19th-century botanist
- William Barron, United States Marshal for the District of Vermont
- Charles L. Bartlett, Mayor of Marlborough, Massachusetts
- Paul Brigham, second governor of Vermont
- Heinrich Brüning, German chancellor of the Weimar Republic
- Daniel Azro Ashley Buck, US congressman
- Nicholas A. Christakis, sociologist, professor and physician
- Zerah Colburn, child prodigy "mental calculator"
- George A. Converse, Spanish–American War era navy admiral
- Pamela Kyle Crossley, historian
- Jonathan Finer, former deputy national security advisor in Biden administration
- Joseph D. Hatch, Vermont state legislator and mayor of Burlington, Vermont
- Jim Holland, Olympic ski jumper (1992 & 1994)
- Joe Holland, Olympic Nordic combined skier (1988 & 1992)
- Mike Holland, Olympic ski jumper (1984 & 1988)
- Norris Hoyt, politician and lawyer
- Hannah Kearney, Olympic medalist mogul skier (2010 gold, 2014 bronze)
- Bob Keeshan, television's "Captain Kangaroo"
- Laurence G. Leavitt, headmaster of Vermont Academy, Saxtons River
- Tony Lupien, first baseman with the Red Sox, Phillies and White Sox
- David Macaulay, author and illustrator
- Felix McGrath, Olympic alpine skier
- Freya von Moltke, author and lecturer on German resistance to Nazism
- Robby Mook, presidential campaign manager for Hillary Clinton
- George Sylvester Morris, educator and philosophical writer
- Alden Partridge, founder of Norwich University
- Lewis Samuel Partridge, U.S. Marshal for Vermont, and Adjutant General of the Vermont Militia
- Kevin Pearce, snowboarder
- Simon Pearce, glassblower; designer; restaurateur
- Thomas E. G. Ransom, general in the American Civil War
- Eugen Rosenstock-Huessy, historian and social philosopher
- Paul Sample, artist
- Walter H. Stockmayer, chemist and Dartmouth College professor
- Peter Welch, U.S. Senator; former U.S. Congressman and Minority Leader of the Vermont Senate
- Andrew Wheating, Olympic 800-meter runner (2008)
- Edward Bancroft Williston, Medal of Honor recipient
- George Wright, general in the American Civil War
