= Politics of New Hampshire =

United States presidential election results for New Hampshire
Year	Republican / Whig		Democratic		Third party(ies)	
Year	No.	%	No.	%	No.	%
2024	395,523	47.87%	418,488	50.65%	12,246	1.48%
2020	365,660	45.36%	424,937	52.71%	15,608	1.94%
2016	345,790	46.46%	348,526	46.83%	49,980	6.72%
2012	329,918	46.40%	369,561	51.98%	11,493	1.62%
2008	316,534	44.52%	384,826	54.13%	9,610	1.35%
2004	331,237	48.87%	340,511	50.24%	5,990	0.88%
2000	273,559	48.07%	266,348	46.80%	29,174	5.13%
1996	196,532	39.37%	246,214	49.32%	56,429	11.30%
1992	202,484	37.64%	209,040	38.86%	126,421	23.50%
1988	281,537	62.49%	163,696	36.33%	5,292	1.17%
1984	267,051	68.66%	120,395	30.95%	1,508	0.39%
1980	221,705	57.74%	108,864	28.35%	53,430	13.91%
1976	185,935	54.75%	147,635	43.47%	6,048	1.78%
1972	213,724	63.98%	116,435	34.85%	3,900	1.17%
1968	154,903	52.10%	130,589	43.93%	11,807	3.97%
1964	104,029	36.11%	184,064	63.89%	0	0.00%
1960	157,989	53.42%	137,772	46.58%	0	0.00%
1956	176,519	66.11%	90,364	33.84%	111	0.04%
1952	166,287	60.92%	106,663	39.08%	0	0.00%
1948	121,299	52.41%	107,995	46.66%	2,146	0.93%
1944	109,916	47.87%	119,663	52.11%	48	0.02%
1940	110,127	46.78%	125,292	53.22%	0	0.00%
1936	104,642	47.98%	108,460	49.73%	5,012	2.30%
1932	103,629	50.42%	100,680	48.99%	1,211	0.59%
1928	115,404	58.65%	80,715	41.02%	638	0.32%
1924	98,575	59.83%	57,201	34.72%	8,993	5.46%
1920	95,196	59.84%	62,662	39.39%	1,234	0.78%
1916	43,725	49.06%	43,781	49.12%	1,621	1.82%
1912	32,927	37.43%	34,724	39.48%	20,310	23.09%
1908	53,149	59.32%	33,655	37.56%	2,796	3.12%
1904	54,163	60.07%	34,074	37.79%	1,924	2.13%
1900	54,799	59.33%	35,489	38.42%	2,076	2.25%
1896	57,444	68.66%	21,650	25.88%	4,576	5.47%
1892	45,658	51.11%	42,081	47.11%	1,590	1.78%
1888	45,728	50.34%	43,456	47.84%	1,651	1.82%
1884	43,254	51.14%	39,198	46.34%	2,134	2.52%
1880	44,856	51.94%	40,797	47.24%	708	0.82%
1876	41,540	51.83%	38,510	48.05%	91	0.11%
1872	37,168	53.94%	31,425	45.61%	313	0.45%
1868	37,718	55.22%	30,575	44.76%	11	0.02%
1864	36,596	52.56%	33,034	47.44%	0	0.00%
1860	37,519	56.90%	25,887	39.26%	2,537	3.85%
1856	37,473	53.71%	31,891	45.71%	410	0.59%
1852	15,486	30.64%	28,503	56.40%	6,546	12.95%
1848	14,781	29.50%	27,763	55.41%	7,560	15.09%
1844	17,866	36.32%	27,160	55.22%	4,161	8.46%
1840	26,310	43.88%	32,774	54.66%	872	1.45%
1836	6,228	24.99%	18,697	75.01%	0	0.00%
1832	18,938	43.24%	24,855	56.76%	0	0.00%
1828	23,823	54.10%	20,212	45.90%	0	0.00%
1824	9,389	93.59%	0	0.00%	643	6.41%

New Hampshire is often noted for its moderate politics (especially in relation to strongly Democratic neighboring states) and its status as a prominent swing state. The state's politics is also often considered libertarian-leaning, combining fiscal conservatism and social liberalism. Voters predominantly selected Republicans for national office during the 19th and 20th centuries until 1992. Since then, the state has been considered a swing state. Since 2006, control of the state legislature and New Hampshire's congressional seats have switched back and forth between Republicans and Democrats. Although the state has voted for the Democratic candidate in each of the last six presidential elections since 2004, it has done so by relatively small but consistent margins.

Due to its large state legislature, the annual town meetings in most communities, and the prominence of its presidential primary every four years, New Hampshire has been noted for its high level of political participation and retail politics. Some have called politics the "state sport."

== Electoral history ==
Historically, New Hampshire was a conservative state and regularly voted Republican, though Coös County, Strafford County, and Hillsborough County leaned Democratic before the 1970s. Some sources trace the founding of the Republican Party to the town of Exeter in 1853. Between 1856 and 1992, New Hampshire had only strayed from the Republican Party for six elections – 1912, 1916, 1936, 1940, 1944, and 1964. The state voted for Presidents Richard Nixon and Ronald Reagan twice by overwhelming majorities.

Beginning in 1992, New Hampshire became a swing state in both national and local elections. The state supported Democrats Bill Clinton in 1992 and 1996, John Kerry in 2004, Barack Obama in 2008 and 2012, Hillary Clinton in 2016, Joe Biden in 2020 and Kamala Harris in 2024. Among the states that George W. Bush won in the 2000 election, it was the only one to go Democratic in the 2004 election. The state elected two Democratic governors during this period. State Senator Jeanne Shaheen was elected governor in 1996, 1998, and 2000, and following Republican Craig Benson's win in 2002, Democrat John Lynch flipped the seat in 2004.

In 2006, Democrats won both congressional seats (electing Carol Shea-Porter in the 1st district and Paul Hodes in the 2nd district) for the first time since 1911, re-elected Governor John Lynch, and gained a majority on the Executive Council and in both houses of the legislature. Democrats had not held both the legislature and the governorship since 1874. Neither U.S. Senate seat was up for a vote in 2006. In 2008, Democrats retained their majorities, governorship and congressional seats, and former governor Jeanne Shaheen defeated incumbent Republican John E. Sununu for the U.S. Senate in a rematch of the 2002 contest. Barack Obama won the simultaneous presidential election and carried every New Hampshire county for the Democrats for the first time since 1852. At the end of the 2008 election cycle, voters registered Democratic outnumbered those registered Republican.

A 2006 University of New Hampshire survey found that New Hampshire residents who had moved to the state from Massachusetts were mostly Republican. The influx of new Republican voters from Massachusetts has resulted in Republican strongholds in the Boston exurb border towns of Hillsborough and Rockingham counties, while other areas have become increasingly Democratic. The study indicated that immigrants from states other than Massachusetts tended to lean Democratic.

In the 2010 midterm elections, New Hampshire voted out both of its Democratic members in the House of Representatives in favor of Republicans. Republicans also won control of both chambers of the State House by veto-proof majorities, while Governor John Lynch won an unprecedented fourth term. Two years later, in the 2012 elections, New Hampshire voted out both of its Republican members in the House of Representatives in favor of Democrats. At the same time, voters returned Democrats to the majority in the State House of Representatives, while Republicans held on to a narrow 13-11 majority in the State Senate, despite losing the popular vote. Democrat Maggie Hassan won the 2012 gubernatorial election with a 12% margin of victory, with 54.6% of the vote in the gubernatorial election, becoming the first Democrat to succeed another Democrat as Governor of New Hampshire since 1854.

However, Republicans gained control of the State House in 2014, and in the 2016 elections, Republican Executive Councilor Chris Sununu was elected as Governor, giving Republicans full control over state government. However, the state narrowly went to Democrat Hillary Clinton over Republican Donald Trump in that year's presidential election. Meanwhile, Democratic governor Maggie Hassan defeated incumbent Republican Kelly Ayotte to join Senator Jeanne Shaheen and Representatives Carol Shea-Porter and Ann McLane Kuster to make the entire congressional delegation represented by the Democratic party for the first time since 1854.

In the 2018 midterm elections, both chambers of the state legislature returned to Democratic control, while Sununu was reelected as governor, resulting in divided government. While New Hampshire Democrats retained their seats in the 2020 federal elections, Republicans regained the majority in the state's Senate, House of Representatives, and Executive Council. New Hampshire's incumbent Republican Gov. Chris Sununu also won election to his third term in office against Democrat Dan Feltes. This election signaled Republican strength on a state level, flipping the Senate from a 14-10 Democratic majority to a 14-10 Republican majority. The house flipped to the GOP with 213 Republicans and 187 Democrats.

== Issues ==
=== Anti-regulatory sentiment ===
New Hampshire is often associated with a laissez-faire approach to regulation, economic and government policy. For example, New Hampshire is one of three states in the nation that do not have any laws regulating motorcycle helmet safety. Cigarette taxes in New Hampshire are the cheapest in New England, at $1.78 per 20-pack of cigarettes. This compares with to the average of $4.27 in the region. New Hampshire has legalized off-grid living, not requiring residents to pay a connection fee to local electric companies. Compared to the New England area, and even nationwide, New Hampshire is noted to maintain a homeschool-friendly approach to education. While homeschooling is legal everywhere in the United States, each state government has different laws and regulations surrounding home education. In New Hampshire, homeschooling laws are straightforward and without burdensome regulations on parents. New Hampshire has some of the most lenient gun laws in the country, especially when compared to neighboring states. New Hampshire is New England's most gun-friendly state and fourth most lenient in the country, according to Everytown for Gun Safety. The state does not require gun owners to get a license or register their weapons. The state legislature passed "Constitutional carry" in 2017.

The anti-regulatory sentiment has often helped Republicans maintain a competitive presence in state and local-level politics. The Republican Party controls the offices of governor, secretary of state, attorney general, and both chambers of the state legislature.

=== Same-sex marriage ===
Same-sex marriage became legal in New Hampshire on January 1, 2010, replacing civil unions, which had become legal on January 1, 2008. In doing so, New Hampshire became the second state to recognize same-sex marriage entirely through the legislative process.

After winning veto-proof majorities in both houses of the state legislature in 2010, the Republican leadership in the House attempted to repeal New Hampshire's same-sex marriage law. On March 21, 2012, however, the House defeated the repeal bill on a vote of 211 to 116.

Democrat Maggie Hassan, a supporter of same-sex marriage, ran against the legislature's record and won election as governor in November 2012 and Democrats took control of the House.

=== Taxation ===
Taxation is a perennial electoral issue in New Hampshire, where there is strong opposition to "broad-based" taxes. Their absence is not absolute, however. There is an 8.5% tax on meals and short-term rentals, and there was a 3% income tax on dividends and interest (abolished effective 2025); moreover, the state's 0.55% Business Enterprise Tax is essentially an income tax on sole proprietors who earn over $281,000 per year. However, candidates for legislature and Governor are routinely asked to take "The Pledge" against broad-based taxes.

The property tax is the source of nearly all municipal revenue. It is "broad-based" (affecting even renters, indirectly) but does not attract the same controversy because municipal expenditures are voted locally, typically by Town Meeting, in which every voter can participate.

In 2002, in response to the Claremont Decision resolving with a court-ordered statewide equalization of education funding, New Hampshire instituted a statewide property tax. The tax is lower than the amount already assessed by municipalities, collected by municipalities and essentially returned to them, though legislative adjustments create "donor towns" and "recipient towns." Each new legislature has considered changes to the distribution formula.

Taxes that are not "broad-based" (that is, that residents could avoid paying) have not aroused comparable controversy. For example, the meals and rentals tax disproportionately impacts tourists and visitors, who do not vote. Recent legislatures have covered increased spending with increases in sin taxes, tolls, and filing fees. Some feel it would be simpler and fairer to enact a broad-based tax. In 2008, various Town Meetings considered citizen petitions against "The Pledge." In particular, the property tax is seen as unfairly impacting the poor and especially retirees. Advocates of a state broad-based tax say it would permit higher state payments to municipalities, enabling them to lower property taxes. The opposing argument is that a new state tax would not change this alleviate local taxes, but would eventually lead to more state spending.

=== Tax protests in surrounding states ===
New Hampshire's lower tax burden has also induced contiguous Amesbury and Salisbury, Massachusetts, and not-nearly-contiguous Killington, Vermont in 2004 and 2005, to petition to become part of New Hampshire. This reflected local discontent with restrictions on liberty or profitability, rather than any expectation that their own states plus the U.S. Congress would grant the necessary permission.

== Women in New Hampshire politics ==
Due to New Hampshire's large legislature and the state's history of volunteerism, women have held more political positions in the state than in many others. Since 1975, women have made up at least one-quarter of the state legislature.

The 2008 elections resulted in women holding 13 of the 24 available seats in the New Hampshire Senate, a first for any legislative body in the United States.

Following the 2012 elections, New Hampshire had the first all-female congressional delegation in the country, when Carol Shea-Porter and Ann McLane Kuster were elected to the House of Representatives, joining Senators Jeanne Shaheen and Kelly Ayotte, who had been elected in 2008 and 2010, respectively. The 2012 election also saw New Hampshire elect its second female governor, Maggie Hassan.

Following the 2016 elections, New Hampshire had the first all-female, all-Democratic delegation in the country, when Maggie Hassan defeated incumbent Republican senator Kelly Ayotte in the New Hampshire senate race. Hassan serves alongside Democratic senator Jeanne Shaheen. In the US House, Carol Shea-Porter, a Democrat, defeated incumbent Representative Frank Guinta to represent the 1st Congressional District in New Hampshire again and serving alongside Representative Ann McLane Kuster, a Democrat, who won re-election to represent the 2nd Congressional District.

New Hampshire has elected three women as Governor, Jeanne Shaheen, Maggie Hassan, and Kelly Ayotte. Vesta M. Roy was acting Governor for seven days after the previous Governor Hugh Gallen fell ill and died.

== Libertarian tendencies ==
The state motto of "Live Free or Die" is another political touchstone. In 2006, when welcome signs at the border began to display the marketing slogan, "You're Going to Love It Here," a firestorm erupted and Governor John Lynch acceded to a privately financed effort to erect new signs bearing the state motto. In 1997, a comparable firestorm had greeted a new issue of car license plates on which the motto was printed rather than embossed; the design was promptly changed to increase the size of the motto. (However, the U.S. Supreme Court had ruled in 1977 that those who object to the motto may tape over or cover up the words, either partially or completely.)

When Senator Judd Gregg included an earmark in the REAL ID Act to compensate New Hampshire for being the first state to implement the Act in 2007, the state legislature enacted a law calling the Act "contrary and repugnant to" the state and federal Bill of Rights and prohibiting the state executive branch from implementing it.

=== The Free State Project ===
New Hampshire's libertarian reputation led the Free State Project to select it by vote for a mass migration of libertarians to the state. The Free State Project emphasizes decentralized decision making, encouraging new movers and prior residents of New Hampshire to participate in a way the individual mover deems most appropriate. For example, as of 2017, there were 17 Free Staters elected to the New Hampshire House of Representatives, and in 2021, the New Hampshire Liberty Alliance, which ranks bills and elected representatives based on their adherence to what they see as libertarian principles, and gave 150 representatives as "A−" or above rated representatives. Participants also engage with other like-minded activist groups such as Rebuild New Hampshire, Young Americans for Liberty, and Americans for Prosperity. As of April 2022, approximately 6,232 participants have moved to New Hampshire for the Free State Project. Many of those who have run have not made their affiliation with the Free State Project a prominent feature of their campaigns. The Free State Project has met with opposition not only from Democrats, but also from many within the Republican Party, the party in which most Free State-affiliated candidates have run.

Some Free Staters have conducted acts of civil disobedience to demonstrate their opposition to what they call "victimless crimes." Free Keene, a group of Free Staters in that city, has attracted particular attention to the high number of acts of civil disobedience, which have often been considered confrontational, and their effect on Keene's image and economy. In recent years, a group of Free Keene members, calling themselves "Robin Hooders," have fed expired parking meters and videotaped their encounters with the parking enforcement officers, suggesting that the officers should refrain from writing tickets and get a different job. The close encounters with the "Robin Hooders" resulted in one officer resigning his position and a lawsuit filed by the City of Keene citing harassment of their employees. In December 2013, the judge overseeing the case dismissed the city's arguments against the "Robin Hooders" on First Amendment grounds, citing the public sidewalks' role as a traditional public forum.

== Party registration ==
Party registration as of May 5, 2025
Party	Total voters	Percentage
Undeclared	380,695	38.84%
Republican	324,101	33.06%
Democratic	275,280	28.08%
Total	980,076	100%

== See also ==
- Free State Project
- Government of New Hampshire
- Libertarian Party of New Hampshire
- New Hampshire Democratic Party
- New Hampshire Liberty Alliance
- New Hampshire primary
- New Hampshire Republican State Committee
- Political party strength in New Hampshire
- Town meeting
