= 1956 United States presidential election in New Hampshire =

- November 6, 1956

Nominee	Dwight D. Eisenhower	Adlai Stevenson
Party	Republican	Democratic
Home state	Pennsylvania	Illinois
Running mate	Richard Nixon	Estes Kefauver
Electoral vote	4	0
Popular vote	176,519	90,364
Percentage	66.11%	33.84%

Eisenhower
50–60%
60–70%
70–80%
80–90%
90–100%
Stevenson
50–60%
60–70%
President before election
Dwight D. Eisenhower
Republican
Elected President
Dwight D. Eisenhower
Republican

The 1956 United States presidential election in New Hampshire took place on November 6, 1956, as part of the 1956 United States presidential election, which was held throughout all contemporary 48 states. Voters chose four representatives, or electors to the Electoral College, who voted for president and vice president.

New Hampshire was won by the Republican nominees, incumbent President Dwight D. Eisenhower of Pennsylvania and his running mate incumbent Vice President Richard Nixon of California. Eisenhower and Nixon defeated the Democratic nominees, former Governor Adlai Stevenson of Illinois and his running mate Senator Estes Kefauver of Tennessee.

Eisenhower took 66.11% of the vote to Stevenson's 33.84%, a margin of 32.27%. Eisenhower, a war hero and moderate Republican who had pledged to maintain popular New Deal Democratic policies, had wide appeal beyond the boundaries of the traditional Republican coalition. New Hampshire had been narrowly carried by Democrat Franklin Roosevelt 3 out of 4 times, although the state narrowly reverted to the GOP in 1948. However Eisenhower's unique personal appeal brought the state decisively back into the Republican column in both 1952 and 1956,

Eisenhower in 1956 swept every county in New Hampshire, the first Republican to do so since Calvin Coolidge in 1924. Since Franklin Roosevelt won them in 1932, the counties of Hillsborough County, Strafford County, and Coos County had become reliable New Deal Democratic base counties, voting for Roosevelt all four times as well as for Harry S. Truman. Eisenhower had won back Strafford County and Coos County for the GOP in 1952, however, he had lost Hillsborough County, home to Manchester and Nashua, which had been a reliable Democratic bastion since voting for Democrat Al Smith in 1928. However, in 1956, Eisenhower won a majority even in Hillsborough County.

Carroll County had long been the most Republican county in New Hampshire, voting 60% against FDR all four times and over 70% for Thomas E. Dewey in 1948, and would give Eisenhower over 80% of vote in both 1952 and 1956. Eisenhower's 85.38% performance here in 1956 is the strongest performance ever by any candidate in any of New Hampshire's counties, and the only time any candidate has won over 85% in any New Hampshire county. As Eisenhower won a decisive re-election victory nationally, New Hampshire's results would make the state almost 17% more Republican than the national average, the third most Republican state in the nation behind its Upper New England neighbors Vermont and Maine, a substantial jump from being only the twelfth most Republican state in 1952. The popular incumbent had governed in a very moderate way that appealed to New England voters, and was able to gain dramatically among voters in states like New Hampshire compared to 1952.

== Results ==
1956 United States presidential election in New Hampshire
Party	Candidate	Votes	Percentage	Electoral votes
Republican	Dwight D. Eisenhower (inc.)	176,519	66.11%	4
Democratic	Adlai Stevenson	90,364	33.84%	0
No Party Listed	T. Coleman Andrews	111	0.04%	0
Totals		266,994	100.00%	4

=== Results by county ===
County	Dwight D. Eisenhower Republican		Adlai Stevenson Democratic		T. Coleman Andrews No Party Listed		Margin		Total votes cast
County	#	%	#	%	#	%	#	%	Total votes cast
Belknap	9,902	75.95%	3,131	24.01%	5	0.04%	6,771	51.94%	13,038
Carroll	7,527	85.38%	1,281	14.53%	8	0.09%	6,246	70.85%	8,816
Cheshire	12,585	69.26%	5,574	30.68%	11	0.06%	7,011	38.58%	18,170
Coös	11,465	66.13%	5,871	33.86%	2	0.01%	5,594	32.27%	17,338
Grafton	15,609	74.04%	5,466	25.93%	6	0.03%	10,143	48.11%	21,081
Hillsborough	45,248	55.50%	36,234	44.44%	46	0.06%	9,014	11.06%	81,528
Merrimack	22,060	71.68%	8,711	28.31%	3	0.01%	13,349	43.37%	30,774
Rockingham	28,226	73.42%	10,198	26.53%	18	0.05%	18,028	46.89%	38,442
Strafford	15,494	61.58%	9,659	38.39%	7	0.03%	5,835	23.19%	25,160
Sullivan	8,403	66.44%	4,239	33.52%	5	0.04%	4,164	32.92%	12,647
Totals	176,519	66.11%	90,364	33.84%	111	0.04%	86,155	32.27%	266,994

==== Counties that flipped from Democratic to Republican ====
- Hillsborough

== See also ==
- Presidency of Dwight D. Eisenhower
- United States presidential elections in New Hampshire
