= 2018 New Hampshire elections =

New Hampshire state elections in 2018 were held on Tuesday, November 6, 2018, with the primary elections being held on June 5, 2018. Voters elected two members to the United States House of Representatives, the governor of New Hampshire, all five members to the Executive Council, all 24 members to the New Hampshire Senate, and all 400 members to the New Hampshire House of Representatives, and other local elected offices.

== Overview ==
=== Turnout ===
==== Primary election ====
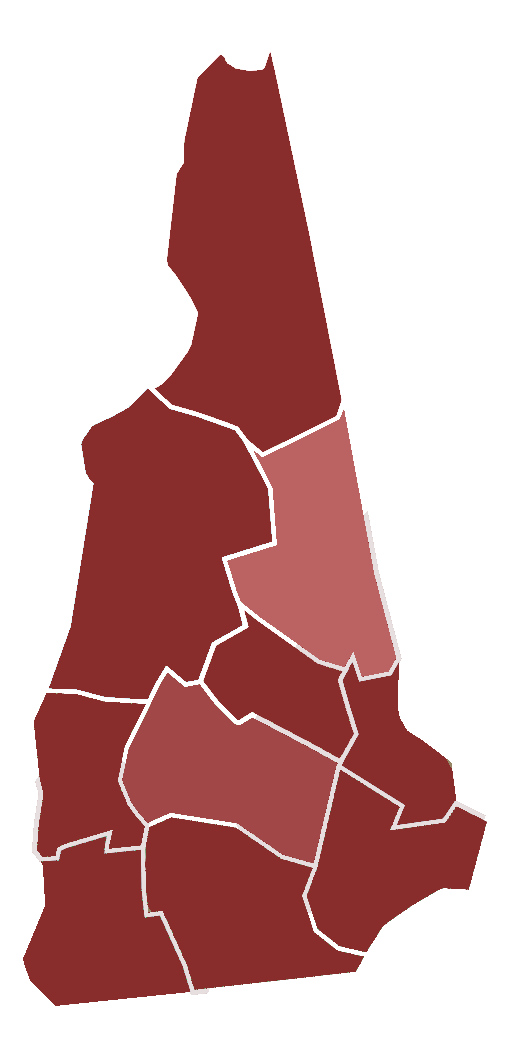
Turnout of the 2018 New Hampshire primary election by county 20%–24.99% 25%–29.99% 30%–34.99%

The primary election was held on Tuesday, June 5, 2018. Turnout by county:

County	Registered voters	Ballots cast	Turnout (%)
Belknap County	46,189	11,352	24.58%
Carroll County	37,233	11,274	30.28%
Cheshire County	57,022	12,641	22.17%
Coos County	20,094	4,599	22.89%
Grafton County	67,404	14,536	21.56%
Hillsborough County	270,722	63,357	23.40%
Merrimack County	109,163	28,302	25.93%
Rockingham County	234,112	54,722	23.37%
Strafford County	92,087	20,965	22.77%
Sullivan County	28,370	6,514	22.96%
Totals	962,396	228,262	23.72%

==== General election ====
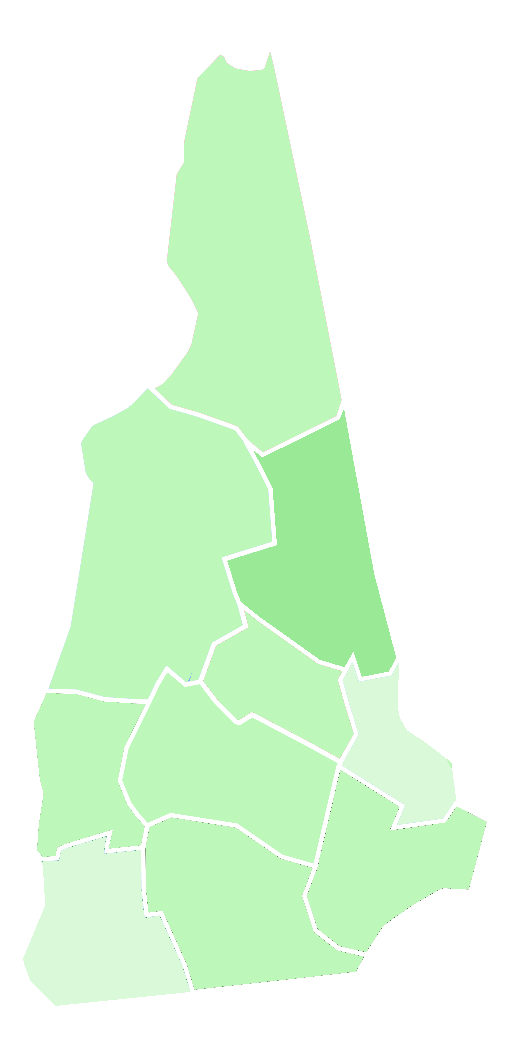
Turnout of the 2018 New Hampshire general election by county 50%–54.99% 55%–59.99% 60%–64.99%

The general election was held on Tuesday, November 6, 2018. Turnout by county:

County	Registered voters	Ballots cast	Turnout (%)
Belknap County	47,856	27,229	56.90%
Carroll County	40,166	24,336	60.59%
Cheshire County	60,018	32,789	54.63%
Coos County	20,595	11,788	57.23%
Grafton County	71,748	40,758	56.81%
Hillsborough County	282,659	164,337	58.14%
Merrimack County	113,433	65,887	58.08%
Rockingham County	244,859	141,565	57.81%
Strafford County	98,529	54,072	54.88%
Sullivan County	29,141	17,453	59.89%
Totals	1,009,004	580,214	57.50%

== United States Congress ==
=== Senate ===
New Hampshire held no election for the United States Senate in 2018, as the state is not represented in the Senate by a seat of Class 1.

=== House of Representatives ===
New Hampshire's two seats in the United States House of Representatives were up for election. Both seats were retained by the Democratic Party.

== State's constitutional offices ==
=== Governor ===
Incumbent Republican Chris Sununu was reelected against Democratic nominee Molly Kelly.

New Hampshire gubernatorial election, 2018
Party	Candidate	Votes	%	±%
Republican	Chris Sununu (incumbent)	302,764	52.78%	+3.94%
Democratic	Molly Kelly	262,359	45.74%	−0.83%
Libertarian	Jilletta Jarvis	8,197	1.43%	−2.88%
n/a	Write-ins	282	0.05%	−0.23%
Total votes		573,602	100.0%	N/A
Republican hold				

=== Executive council ===
All five seats of the New Hampshire Executive Council were up for election. Democrats gained one seat, and thus achieved a 3–2 majority.

== State legislature ==
=== State senate ===
All 24 seats of the New Hampshire Senate were up for election. Democrats achieved a 14–10 majority.

=== State House of Representatives ===
All 400 seats of the New Hampshire House of Representatives were up for election. Democrats achieved a 234–166 majority.
