= 2012 United States presidential election in New Hampshire =

- November 6, 2012

Nominee	Barack Obama	Mitt Romney
Party	Democratic	Republican
Home state	Illinois	Massachusetts
Running mate	Joe Biden	Paul Ryan
Electoral vote	4	0
Popular vote	369,561	329,918
Percentage	51.98%	46.40%

Obama
40–50%
50–60%
60–70%
70–80%
90–100%
Romney
40–50%
50–60%
60–70%
70–80%
Tie/No data
50%
President before election
Barack Obama
Democratic
Elected President
Barack Obama
Democratic

The 2012 United States presidential election in New Hampshire took place on November 6, 2012, as part of the 2012 United States presidential election in which all 50 states plus the District of Columbia participated. New Hampshire voters chose four electors to represent them in the Electoral College via a popular vote pitting incumbent Democratic President Barack Obama and his running mate, Vice President Joe Biden, against Republican challenger and former Massachusetts Governor Mitt Romney and his running mate, U.S. Representative Paul Ryan.

New Hampshire voters chose to re-elect President Barack Obama, giving him 51.98% of the vote to Mitt Romney's 46.40%, a Democratic victory margin of 5.58%. Despite Obama winning all of the state's counties in 2008, he lost three of them to Romney this election: Belknap, Carroll, and Rockingham.

This was the first time since 1988 that either major party won New Hampshire in more than two consecutive presidential races, and the first time Democrats did so since 1944. As of the 2024 presidential election, 2012 is the last time in which the Democratic candidate won Coös County, and the last election where New Castle voted Republican.

== Primaries ==
=== Democratic primary ===
New Hampshire held its primaries on January 10, 2012. The state is historically the first in the nation to hold presidential primaries, and moved its date up from February after Florida moved its primary date to January 31. Because New Hampshire has a proportional-delegate primary, the state's 12 national delegates will be allocated in proportion to candidates' percent of the popular vote.

Incumbent president Barack Obama won all the delegates and was renominated.

A Democratic presidential candidates debate, held at Saint Anselm College in December 2011, was attended by seven candidates; Obama did not participate.

60,659 votes were cast in the primary. Obama won with 49,080 votes. The total votes cast were more than 30% fewer than in 1996, the last time that a Democratic president ran for re-election without significant opposition.

Candidate	Votes	Percentage	Delegates
Barack Obama (incumbent)	49,080	80.91%	10
Ron Paul (write-in)	2,289	3.77%	-
Mitt Romney (write-in)	1,814	2.99%	-
Jon Huntsman (write-in)	1,238	2.04%	-
Ed Cowan	945	1.56%	-
Vermin Supreme	833	1.37%	-
Randall Terry	446	1%	-
Scatter (write-in)	772	1.27%	-
John D. Haywood	423	0.70%	-
Craig Freis	400	0.66%	-
Rick Santorum (write-in)	302	0.50%	-
Bob Ely	287	0.47%	-
Newt Gingrich (write-in)	276	0.46%	-
Cornelius Edward O'Connor	265	0.44%	-
Darcy Richardson	264	0.44%	-
John Wolfe, Jr.	245	0.40%	-
Edward T. O'Donnell	222	0.37%	-
Bob Greene	213	0.35%	-
Robert B. Jordan	155	0.26%	-
Aldous C. Tyler	106	0.17%	-
Buddy Roemer (write-in)	29	0.05%	-
Fred Karger	26	0.04%	-
Rick Perry (write-in)	17	0.03%	-
Stewart Greenleaf (write-in)	4	0.01%	-
Gary Johnson (write-in)	4	0.01%	-
Michael Meehan	4	0.01%	-
Michele Bachmann (write-in)	2	0.00%	-
Herman Cain (write-in)	1	0.00%	-

=== Republican primary ===
2012 New Hampshire Republican presidential primary
- January 10, 2012

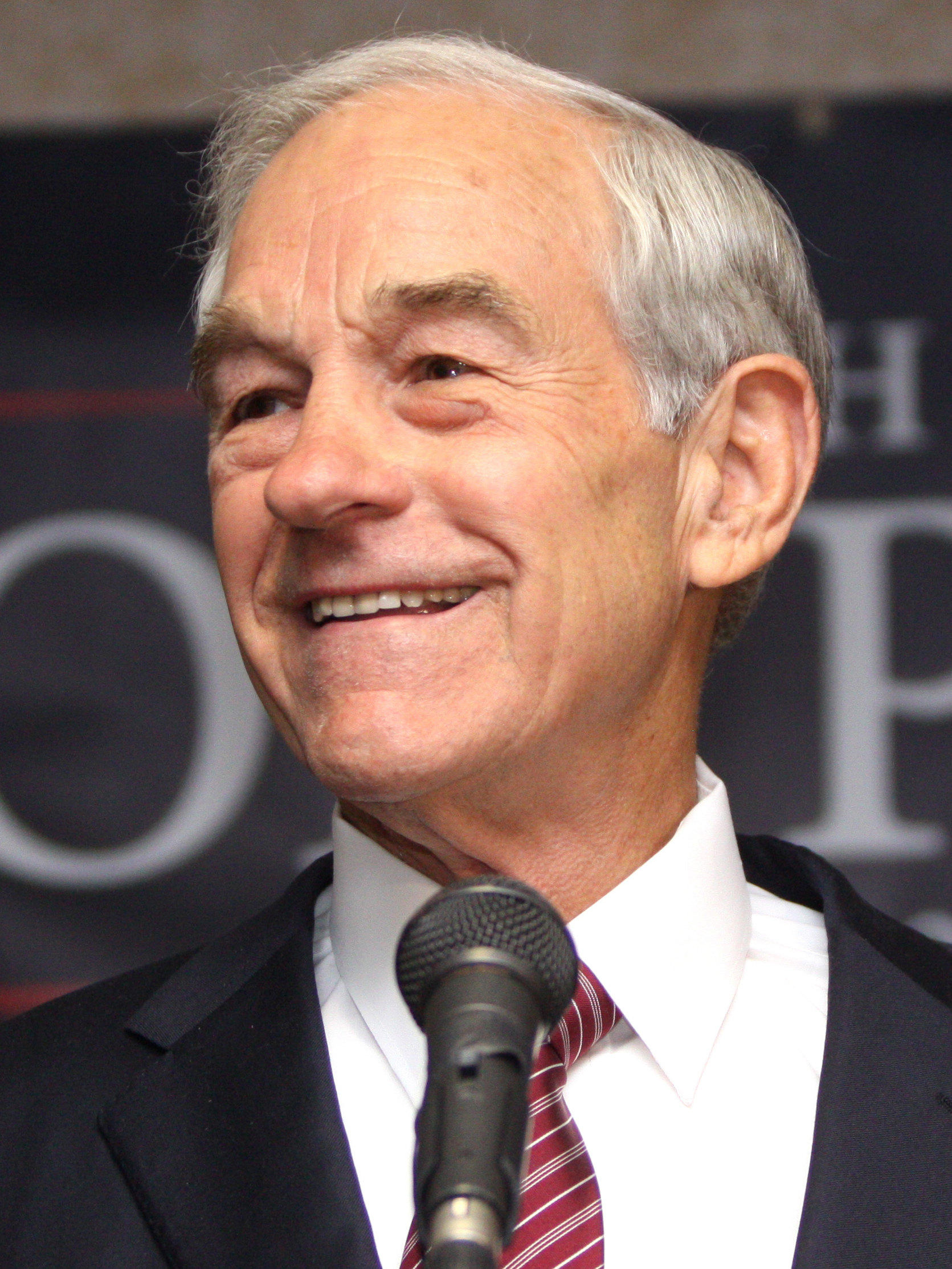

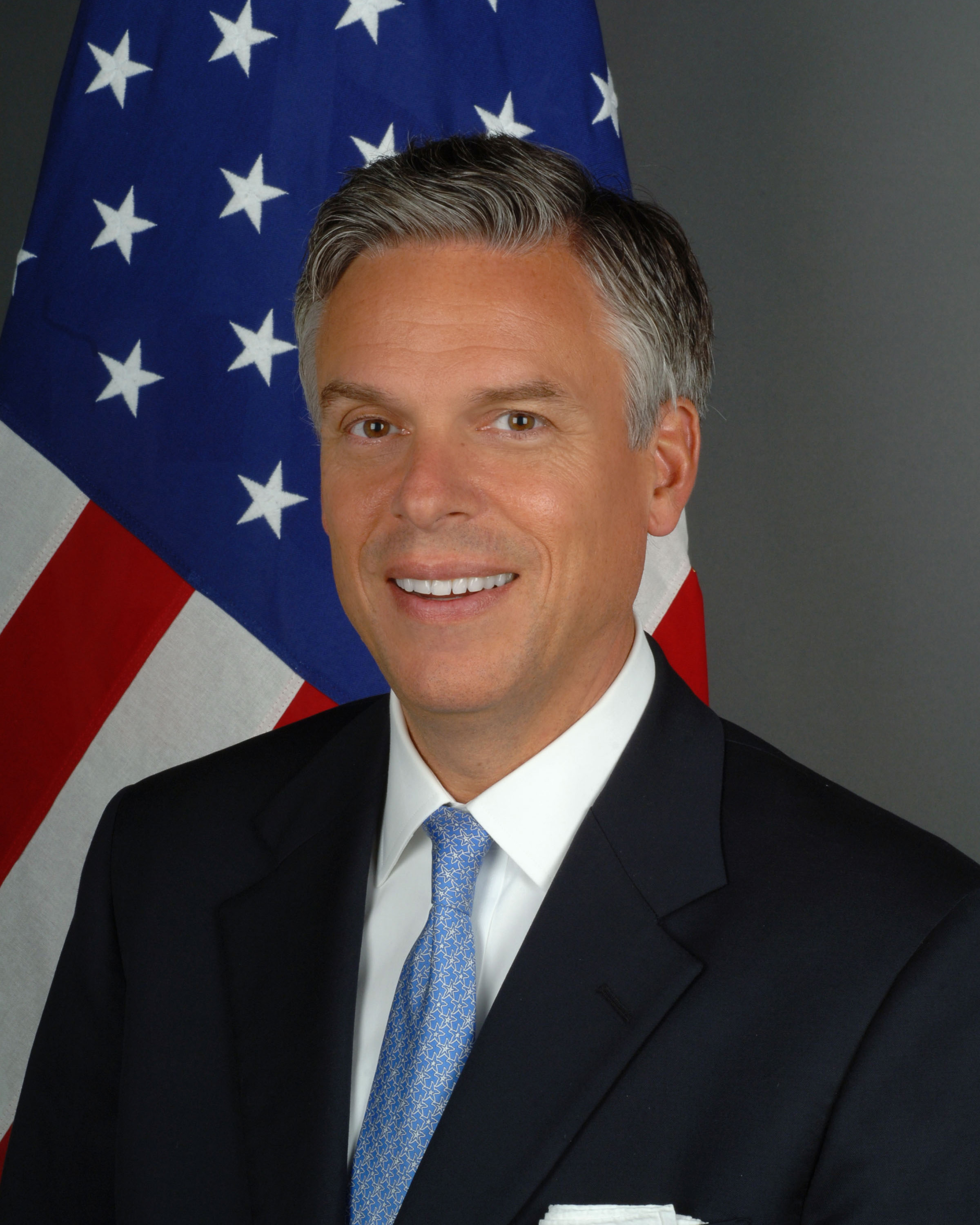

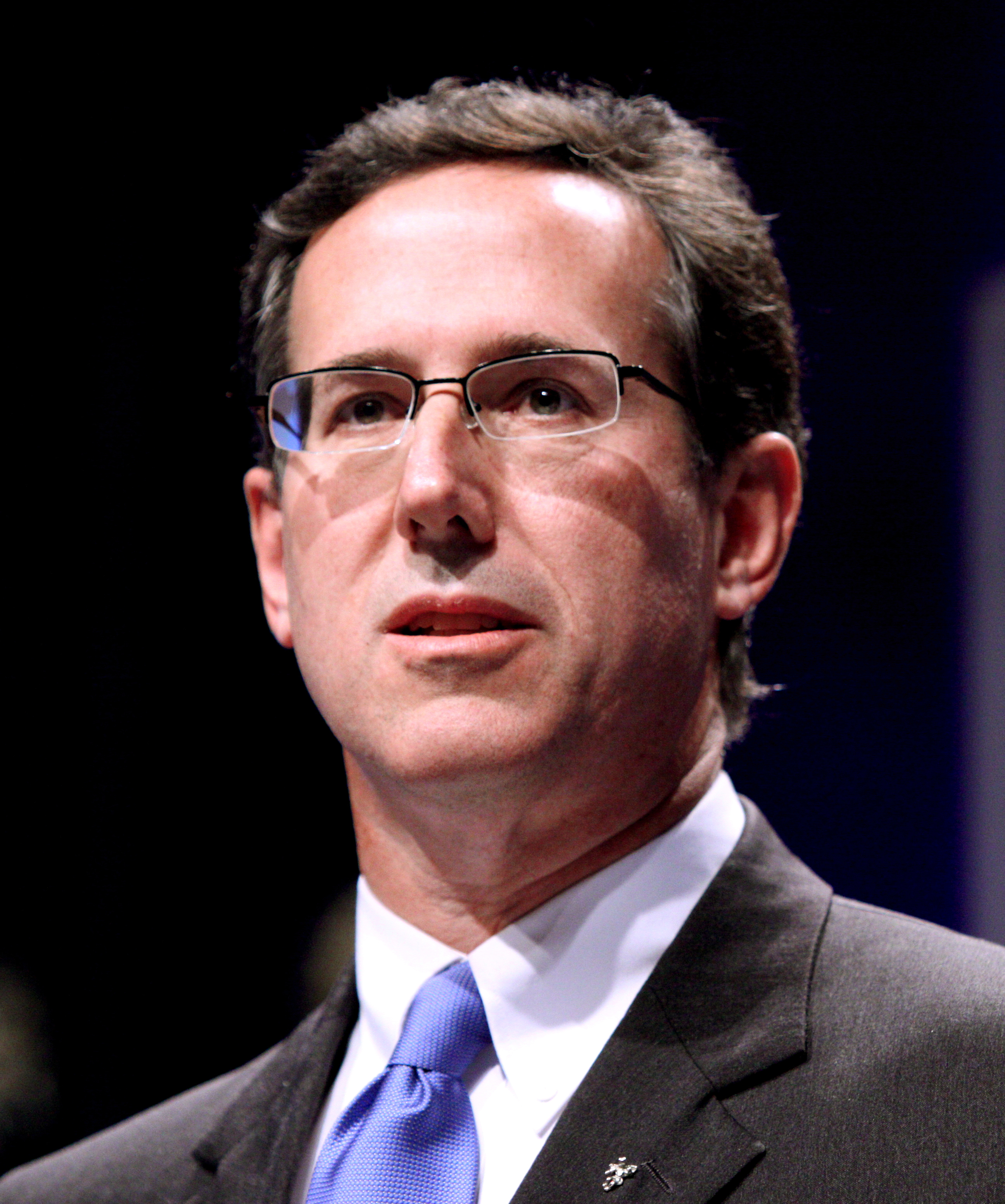

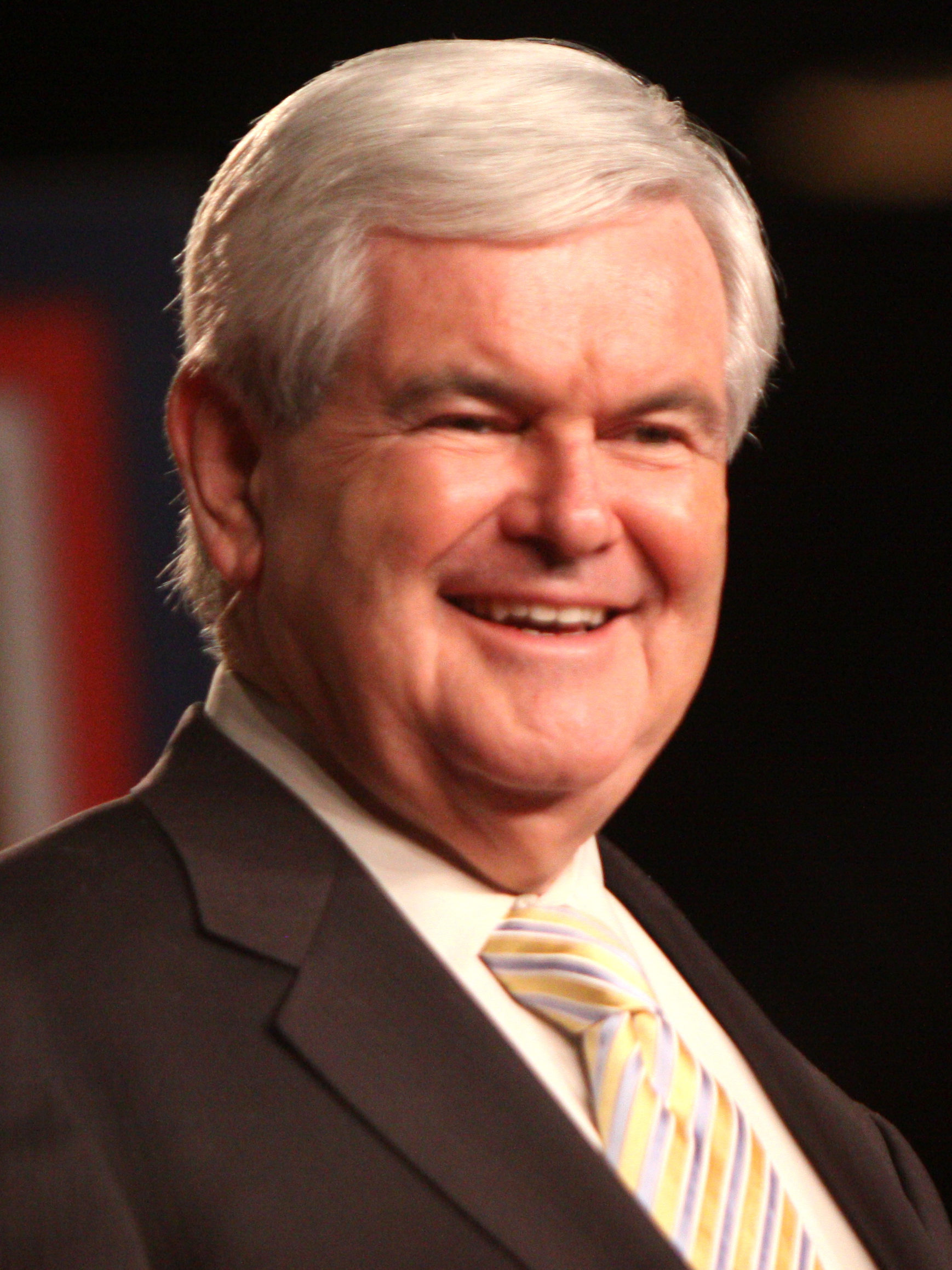
Candidate	Mitt Romney	Ron Paul	Jon Huntsman
Home state	Massachusetts	Texas	Utah
Delegate count	7	3	2
Popular vote	97,591	56,872	41,964
Percentage	39.28%	22.89%	16.89%
Candidate	Rick Santorum	Newt Gingrich
Home state	Pennsylvania	Georgia
Delegate count	0	0
Popular vote	23,432	23,421
Percentage	9.43%	9.43%
- New Hampshire results by county Mitt Romney Ron Paul

The Republican primary took place on Tuesday, January 10, 2012. Former Massachusetts Governor Mitt Romney won the primary.

==== Campaign ====
Former Massachusetts Governor Mitt Romney, Texas Congressman Ron Paul, Former Utah Governor Jon Huntsman, Former Speaker of the House Newt Gingrich, and Former Pennsylvania Senator Rick Santorum were heavily contesting and campaigning in the New Hampshire primary. Santorum won the Iowa Caucus on January 3, but no one knew that yet, and believed Romney had won by 8 votes.

Televised debates in New Hampshire were held on January 7, 2012, on ABC News at Saint Anselm College and the following morning on January 8, 2012, on NBC's Meet the Press and MSNBC. All major Republican candidates attended both debates.

==== Ballot access ====
In 2012, a record 33 Republican candidates filed to appear on the ballot in New Hampshire, including various single-issue activists, protest candidates, and perennial candidates. For instance, Stewart Greenleaf, who had no interest in becoming president, registered for the ballot to promote the issue of government spending in the Republican Party. Under New Hampshire's lenient ballot access laws, a candidate is only required to pay $1,000 to the state's treasury, and needs no party approval or petitions for placement.

==== Endorsements ====
Various newspapers that circulate widely in New Hampshire made endorsements ahead of the New Hampshire primary. While the conservative Union Leader, the only statewide newspaper, endorsed Gingrich, various newspapers endorsed Huntsman, with the Valley News stating that Huntsman was "a candidate whose views are solidly conservative, but not myopically so" and criticizing Romney and Gingrich, stating that "The former has raised the flip-flop to an art form, while the latter has done the same for hypocrisy" and endorsing Huntsman "in the hopes that the cooler heads will prevail in New Hampshire and elsewhere." Romney also received support, including from the Portsmouth Herald of the Seacoast Region.

- The New Hampshire Union Leader endorsed Gingrich on November 27.
- Foster's Daily Democrat endorsed Romney on December 4.
- The Portsmouth Herald and Seacoast Media Group endorsed Romney on December 18.
- The Keene Sentinel endorsed Huntsman on December 18.
- The Valley News endorsed Huntsman on December 18.
- The Conway Daily Sun endorsed Romney on December 21.
- The Concord Monitor endorsed Huntsman on December 22.
- The Boston Herald endorsed Romney.
- The Salmon Press Newspapers group (the Littleton Courier, Berlin Reporter, and Coos County Democrat) endorsed Paul on January 4.
- The Nashua Telegraph endorsed Romney on January 5.
- The Boston Globe endorsed Huntsman on January 6.
- The Eagle-Tribune endorsed Romney on January 6.

Romney led the field in endorsements from New Hampshire Republican elected officials. The New York Times reported that after losing New Hampshire in the 2008 primary to John McCain, Romney devoted considerable time and money to gain the support of New Hampshire Republican figures. Romney's political action committee (PAC) "spread thousands of dollars" to New Hampshire Republican campaigns, including that of youthful Republican state Representative D.J. Bettencourt of the Republican-heavy Salem area, elected state House majority leader in 2011, who is one of Romney's most active supporters. Romney's PAC also donated $25,000 to the New Hampshire Republican State Committee under the chairmanship of prominent New Hampshire party player John H. Sununu, a former governor and White House Chief of Staff. Republican candidates for state Senate and state House, small-town Republican committees, and county sheriffs and district attorneys were all "recipients of [Romney's] largesse." Romney was criticized by some as "buying" endorsements, who referenced "blatantly transactional terms that lie behind the announcements." A large number of officials endorsing Romney, in New Hampshire and in other early primary states, had received contributions first.

By December 11, Romney had already received the endorsement of Ted Gatsas, mayor of Manchester (New Hampshire's largest city) and former state Senate president, and 58 endorsements from state representatives. According to prominent Romney supporter Thomas D. Rath, a former state attorney general described as a Republican power broker, on the eve of the primary the Romney campaign had been endorsed by 11 of 19 Republicans in the State Senate, 73 or 74 of the Republican state representatives, and eight of the 10 sheriffs, as well as the mayor of the largest city. The New York Times reported that so many officials endorsed Romney that it took a three-page pamphlet mailed to New Hampshire Republicans to list them all. The Times reported that Romney-supporting officials "introduce him at virtually every campaign stop, flood gyms and seniors centers with crowds on short notice and attack his Republican rivals."

Of the three Republicans in New Hampshire's congressional delegation, Senator Kelly Ayotte and Representative Charles Bass endorsed Romney, while Frank Guinta declined to endorse a candidate. Executive Council members Raymond S. Burton (who has represented northern New Hampshire since the 1970s), Christopher T. Sununu, and Raymond Wieczorek; State Senate Majority Leader Jeb Bradley, state Senators David Boutin, John Barnes, Jr., Jim Rausch, and Chuck Morse; and former state Senate President Tom Eaton endorsed Romney before December 7. Douglas Dutile, the sheriff of Grafton County, also endorsed Romney.

Senator John McCain of Arizona, who won the New Hampshire Republican primary in 2000 and 2008 and was the Republican nominee for president in 2008, endorsed Romney following the Iowa caucuses and ahead of the New Hampshire primary at a Manchester rally on January 4, despite prior tension between the two in the 2008 primary race.

After Iowa but before the New Hampshire primaries, tea party movement-aligned Buffalo, New York businessman Carl Paladino, the 2010 gubernatorial candidate in nearby New York, supported Gingrich and sharply criticized the rest of the candidates.

New Hampshire House Speaker William L. (Bill) O'Brien endorsed Gingrich, while former House speakers George Roberts, Howard Burns, John Tucker, Donna Sytek, and Doug Scamman endorsed Romney. State Senators Jim Forsythe, Andy Sanborn, and Ray White endorsed Ron Paul.

Notably, former PA Sen. Rick Santorum gained a disproportionately high number of endorsements (when compared to his pre-Iowa polling in the single digits) in the run up to and including the NH Primary. At one point Santorum led the entire field of GOP candidates in total number of endorsements (until the entrance of Romney and Perry), and finished with more endorsees than even Huntsman who finished third in the race. This was due in large part to the efforts of Santorum's State Co-chairs: Rep. Dan Tamburello, a current member of the NH House of Representatives from Londonderry who spearheaded the effort, Hon. Bill Cahill, a former Governor's Councilor and member of the NH House, and Claira Monier, a notable Republican party activist who was instrumental in Reagan's NH victory in 1980. Sen Santorum's national campaign manager was by Mike Biundo, who was the architect of former Manchester mayor Frank Guinta's surprising 2010 primary upset for the NH 1st Congressional district; Guinta went on to win the NH-1 district in November 2010 in a decisive victory over Democrat Carol-Shea Porter, who never conceded the race. Other notable endorsements for the Senator included Sen. Jim Luther, Sen. Fenton Groen, former candidate for Governor Karen Testerman, Rep Susan DeLemus, and NH Tea-Party luminary Jerry DeLemus. Testerman and the DeLemus' endorsed Rick after having defected from the Bachmann camp.

==== Results ====
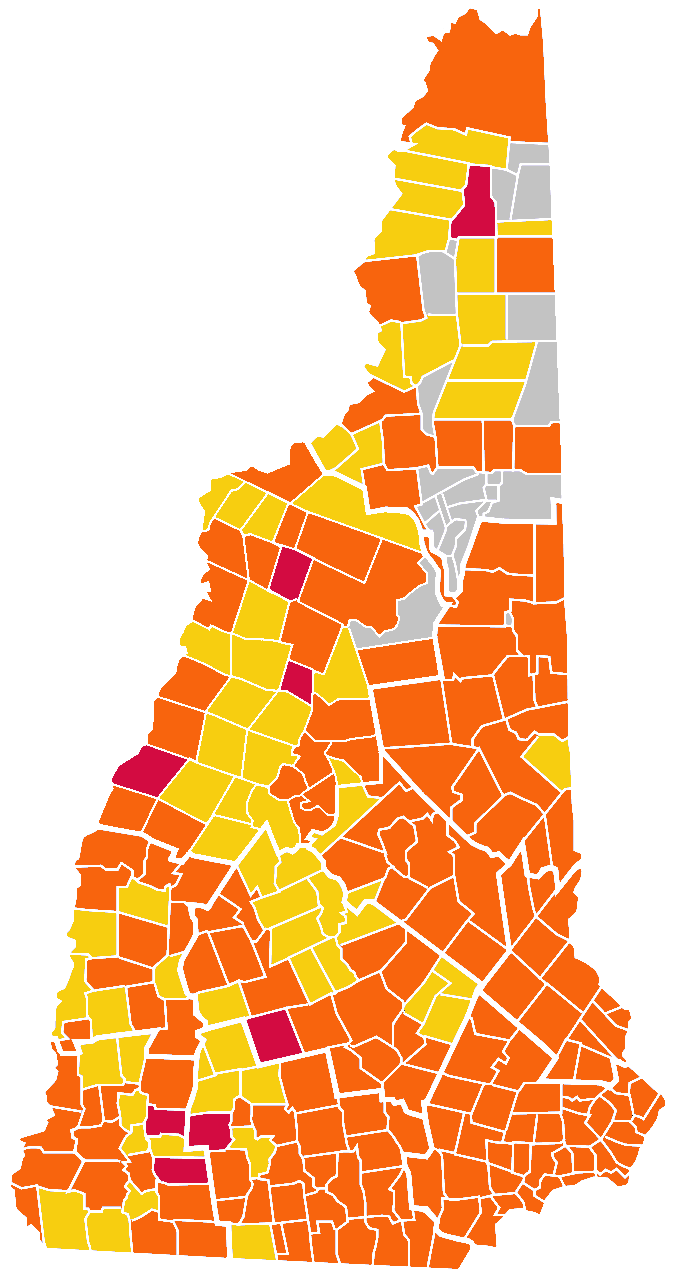
New Hampshire results by municipality Mitt Romney Ron Paul Jon Huntsman Not reported

New Hampshire Republican primary, February 10, 2012 - certified result
Candidate	Votes	Percentage	Projected delegate count		
Candidate	Votes	Percentage	AP	CNN	GP
Mitt Romney	97,591	39.28%	8	8	7
Ron Paul	56,872	22.89%	3	3	3
Jon Huntsman	41,964	16.89%	1	0	2
Rick Santorum	23,432	9.43%	0	0	0
Newt Gingrich	23,421	9.43%	0	0	0
Rick Perry	1,764	0.71%	0	0	0
Buddy Roemer	950	0.38%	0	0	0
Michele Bachmann (withdrawn)	350	0.14%	0	0	0
Fred Karger	345	0.14%	0	0	0
Barack Obama (write-in)	285	0.11%	0	0	0
Kevin Rubash	250	0.10%	0	0	0
Gary Johnson (withdrawn)	181	0.07%	0	0	0
Herman Cain (withdrawn)	161	0.06%	0	0	0
Jeff Lawman	119	0.05%	0	0	0
Chris Hill	108	0.04%	0	0	0
Benjamin Linn	83	0.03%	0	0	0
Michael Meehan	54	0.02%	0	0	0
Keith Drummond	42	0.02%	0	0	0
Rickey Story	42	0.02%	0	0	0
Bear Betzler	29	0.01%	0	0	0
Joe Robinson	25	0.01%	0	0	0
Stewart Greenleaf	24	0.01%	0	0	0
Donald Trump (write-in)	24	0.01%	0	0	0
Sarah Palin (write-in)	23	0.01%	0	0	0
Mark Callahan	20	0.01%	0	0	0
Andy Martin	19	0.01%	0	0	0
Linden Swift	18	0.01%	0	0	0
Tim Brewer	15	0.01%	0	0	0
Vern Wuensche	15	0.01%	0	0	0
L. John Davis	14	0.01%	0	0	0
Randy Crow	12	0.00%	0	0	0
Vermin Supreme (write-in)	4	0.00%	0	0	0
James Vestermark	3	0.00%	0	0	0
Hugh Cort	3	0.00%	0	0	0
Other Write-ins	213	0.09%	0	0	0
Total:	248,475	100.00%	12	11	12

== General election ==
=== Polling ===
New Hampshire was rated as a toss-up to Lean D state. Polling showed a consistent single digit polling lead for President Obama. The average of the final 3 polls had Obama leading Romney 50% to 47.3%.

=== Predictions ===
Source	Ranking	As of
Huffington Post	Lean D	November 6, 2012
CNN	Tossup	November 6, 2012
New York Times	Tossup	November 6, 2012
Washington Post	Tossup	November 6, 2012
RealClearPolitics	Tossup	November 6, 2012
Sabato's Crystal Ball	Lean D	November 5, 2012
FiveThirtyEight	Likely D	November 6, 2012

=== Results ===
2012 United States presidential election in New Hampshire
Party	Candidate	Running mate	Votes	Percentage	Electoral votes
Democratic	Barack Obama (incumbent)	Joe Biden (incumbent)	369,561	51.98%	4
Republican	Mitt Romney	Paul Ryan	329,918	46.40%	0
Libertarian	Gary Johnson	Jim Gray	8,212	1.16%	0
Others	Others		2,573	0.36%	0
Constitution	Virgil Goode	Jim Clymer	708	0.10%	0
Totals			710,972	100.00%	4

==== By county ====
County	Barack Obama Democratic		Mitt Romney Republican		Various candidates Other parties		Margin		Total votes cast
County	#	%	#	%	#	%	#	%	Total votes cast
Belknap	15,890	46.89%	17,571	51.85%	426	1.26%	-1,681	-4.96%	33,887
Carroll	13,977	48.87%	14,207	49.67%	418	1.46%	-230	-0.80%	28,602
Cheshire	25,380	61.36%	15,156	36.64%	824	2.00%	10,224	24.72%	41,360
Coos	9,095	57.93%	6,342	40.40%	262	1.67%	2,753	17.53%	15,699
Grafton	29,826	60.85%	18,208	37.15%	980	2.00%	11,618	23.70%	49,014
Hillsborough	102,303	49.74%	99,991	48.62%	3,373	1.64%	2,312	1.12%	205,667
Merrimack	44,756	55.59%	34,524	42.88%	1,234	1.53%	10,232	12.71%	80,514
Rockingham	80,142	47.03%	87,921	51.59%	2,360	1.38%	-7,779	-4.56%	170,423
Strafford	36,026	56.32%	26,729	41.78%	1,214	1.90%	9,297	14.54%	63,969
Sullivan	12,166	55.71%	9,269	42.45%	402	1.84%	2,897	13.26%	21,837
Totals	369,561	51.98%	329,918	46.40%	11,493	1.62%	39,643	5.58%	710,972

Counties that flipped from Democratic to Republican

- Belknap (largest city: Laconia)
- Carroll (largest town: Conway)
- Rockingham (largest town: Derry)

==== By congressional district ====
Obama won both congressional districts.

District	Obama	Romney	Representative
1st	50.21%	48.6%	Carol Shea-Porter
2nd	54.16%	44.51%	Ann McLane Kuster

== See also ==
- United States presidential elections in New Hampshire
- Presidency of Barack Obama
- New Hampshire primary
- New Hampshire Republican Party
- 2012 Republican Party presidential debates and forums
- 2012 Republican Party presidential primaries
- Results of the 2012 Republican Party presidential primaries
