= Bartlett and Albany Railroad =

Overview
- Headquarters: Bartlett
- Locale: White Mountain National Forest
- Dates of operation: 1887–1893

Technical
- Track gauge: 4 ft 8 1/2 in (1,435 mm) standard gauge
- Length: 10 miles (16 km)

The Bartlett and Albany Railroad was a short-lived logging railroad in Carroll County, New Hampshire, in the United States.

The Bartlett and Albany ran from a sawmill and a junction with the Mountain Division in Bartlett, over Bear Notch, and down to a small rail yard near Passaconaway (in Albany). The route was unusual insofar as the highpoint was in the middle. As a result, the grade was "uphill both ways," limiting the load that could be carried.

The railway had just one locomotive, a 2-6-0 bought new from the Portland Company. There was only one round trip daily, bringing supplies over Bear Notch to the logging camps and then bringing logs to the sawmill in Bartlett. There were also a couple of small sawmills near Passaconaway from which sawn lumber was shipped. The afternoon was spent switching cars at the mill. The railway never had a passenger car.

The railway ceased operations in 1894 when the area was logged out. Today, Bear Notch Road follows the right of way from Bartlett and over Bear Notch before diverging to the east.
