= 1952 United States presidential election in New Hampshire =

- November 4, 1952

Nominee	Dwight D. Eisenhower	Adlai Stevenson
Party	Republican	Democratic
Home state	New York	Illinois
Running mate	Richard Nixon	John Sparkman
Electoral vote	4	0
Popular vote	166,287	106,663
Percentage	60.92%	39.08%

Eisenhower
50–60%
60–70%
70–80%
80–90%
90–100%
Stevenson
50–60%
60–70%
70–80%
President before election
Harry S. Truman
Democratic
Elected President
Dwight D. Eisenhower
Republican

The 1952 United States presidential election in New Hampshire took place on November 4, 1952, as part of the 1952 United States presidential election, which was held throughout all contemporary 48 states. Voters chose four representatives, or electors to the Electoral College, who voted for president and vice president.

New Hampshire was won by the Republican nominees, General Dwight D. Eisenhower of New York and his running mate Senator Richard Nixon of California. Eisenhower and Nixon defeated the Democratic nominees Governor Adlai Stevenson of Illinois and his running mate Senator John Sparkman of Alabama.

Eisenhower took 60.92% of the vote to Stevenson's 39.08%, a margin of 21.84%. Eisenhower, a war hero and moderate Republican who had pledged to maintain popular New Deal Democratic policies, had wide appeal beyond the boundaries of the traditional Republican coalition. New Hampshire had been narrowly carried by Democrat Franklin Roosevelt three out of four times, although the state narrowly reverted to the GOP in 1948. However Eisenhower's unique personal appeal brought the state decisively back into the Republican column in 1952.

Eisenhower won nine of the state's ten counties. Since Franklin D. Roosevelt won them in 1932, the counties of Hillsborough County, Strafford County, and Coos County had become reliable New Deal Democratic base counties, voting for Roosevelt all four times as well as for Harry S. Truman. However Eisenhower in 1952 won back Strafford County and Coos County for the GOP, although Stevenson won a majority in Hillsborough County, home to Manchester and Nashua, which had been a reliable Democratic bastion since voting for Democrat Al Smith in 1928.

Carroll County had long been the most Republican county in New Hampshire, voting 60% against FDR all four times and over 70% for Thomas E. Dewey in 1948. Eisenhower would receive over 80% of the vote in the county in 1952. As Eisenhower won a decisive election victory nationally, New Hampshire's results would make the state almost 11% more Republican than the national average.

== Results ==
1952 United States presidential election in New Hampshire
Party	Candidate	Votes	Percentage	Electoral votes
Republican	Dwight D. Eisenhower	166,287	60.92%	4
Democratic	Adlai Stevenson	106,663	39.08%	0
Totals		272,950	100.00%	4

=== Results by county ===
County	Dwight D. Eisenhower Republican		Adlai Stevenson Democratic		Margin		Total votes cast
County	#	%	#	%	#	%	Total votes cast
Belknap	9,567	71.81%	3,755	28.19%	5,812	43.62%	13,322
Carroll	7,498	82.61%	1,578	17.39%	5,920	65.22%	9,076
Cheshire	11,897	63.94%	6,710	36.06%	5,187	27.88%	18,607
Coös	9,975	55.97%	7,848	44.03%	2,127	11.94%	17,823
Grafton	15,937	72.24%	6,124	27.76%	9,813	44.48%	22,061
Hillsborough	41,263	49.68%	41,802	50.32%	-539	-0.64%	83,065
Merrimack	21,824	67.92%	10,310	32.08%	11,514	35.84%	32,134
Rockingham	26,280	68.58%	12,040	31.42%	14,240	37.16%	38,320
Strafford	13,729	53.88%	11,753	46.12%	1,976	7.76%	25,482
Sullivan	8,317	63.68%	4,743	36.32%	3,574	27.36%	13,060
Totals	166,287	60.92%	106,663	39.08%	59,624	21.84%	272,950

==== Counties that flipped from Democratic to Republican ====
- Coös
- Strafford

== See also ==
- Presidency of Dwight D. Eisenhower
- United States presidential elections in New Hampshire
