= 1904 United States presidential election in New Hampshire =

- November 8, 1904
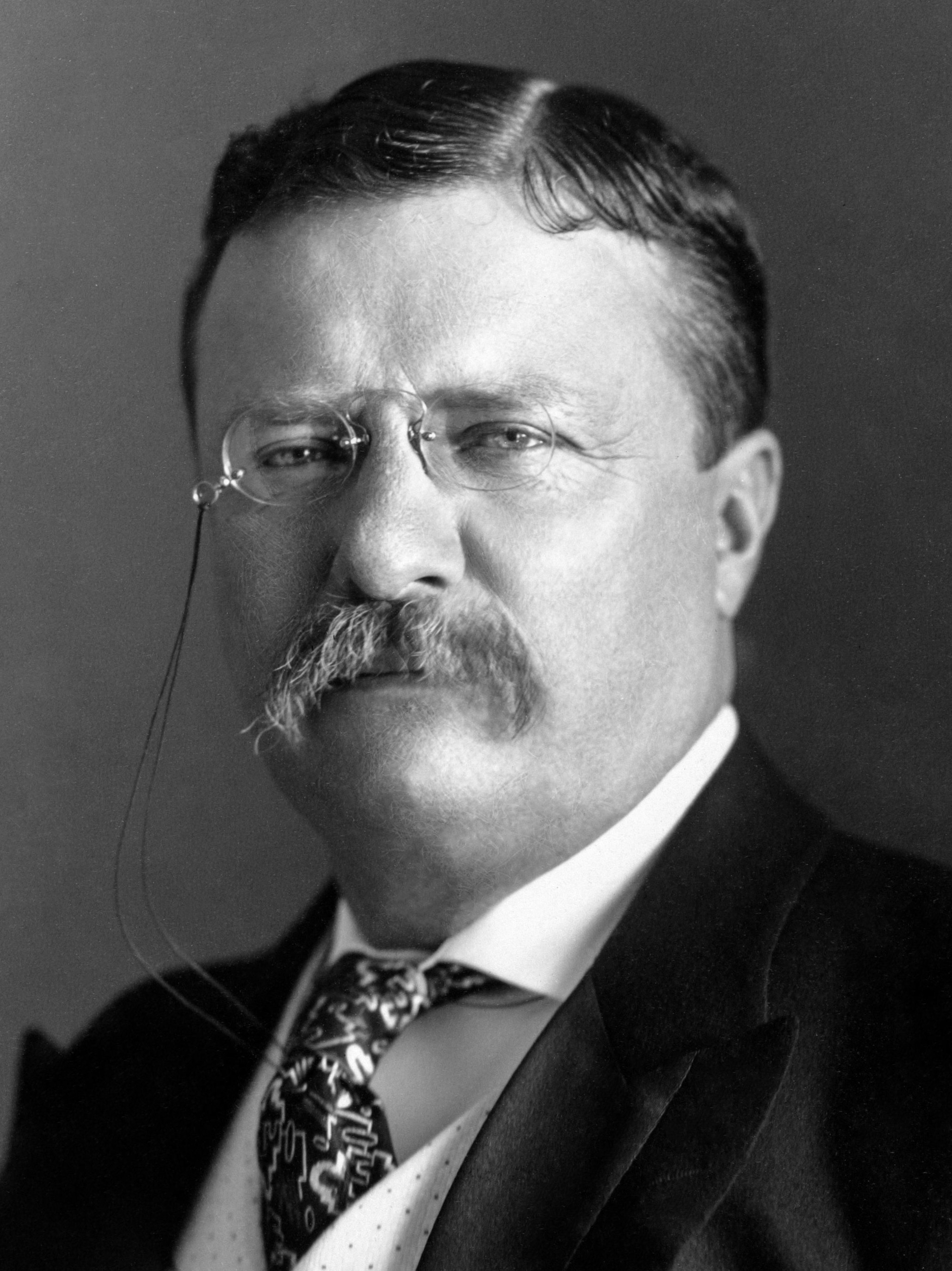

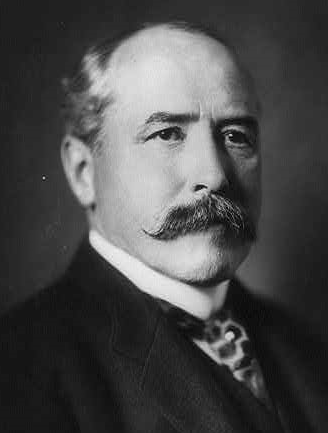
Nominee	Theodore Roosevelt	Alton B. Parker
Party	Republican	Democratic
Home state	New York	New York
Running mate	Charles W. Fairbanks	Henry G. Davis
Electoral vote	4	0
Popular vote	54,163	34,074
Percentage	60.07%	37.79%

Roosevelt
40–50%
50–60%
60–70%
70–80%
80–90%
90–100%
Parker
40–50%
50–60%
60–70%
70–80%
90–100%
Tie
50%
President before election
Theodore Roosevelt
Republican
Elected President
Theodore Roosevelt
Republican

The 1904 United States presidential election in New Hampshire took place on November 8, 1904, as part of the 1904 United States presidential election. Voters chose four representatives, or electors to the Electoral College, who voted for president and vice president.

New Hampshire voted for the Republican nominee, President Theodore Roosevelt, over the Democratic nominee, former Chief Judge of New York Court of Appeals Alton B. Parker. Roosevelt won the state by a margin of 22.28 points.

== Results ==
1904 United States presidential election in New Hampshire
Party	Candidate	Running mate	Popular vote		Electoral vote	
Party	Candidate	Running mate	Count	%	Count	%
Republican	Theodore Roosevelt of New York (incumbent)	Charles Warren Fairbanks of Indiana	54,163	60.07%	4	100.00%
Democratic	Alton Brooks Parker of New York	Henry Gassaway Davis of West Virginia	34,074	37.79%	0	0.00%
Socialist	Eugene Victor Debs of Indiana	Benjamin Hanford of New York	1,090	1.21%	0	0.00%
Prohibition	Silas Comfort Swallow of Pennsylvania	George Washington Carroll of Texas	750	0.83%	0	0.00%
Populist	Thomas Edward Watson of Georgia	Thomas Tibbles of Nebraska	83	0.08%	0	0.00%
N/A	Others	Others	1	0.01%	0	0.00%
Total			90,161	100.00%	4	100.00%

=== Results by county ===
County	Theodore Roosevelt Republican		Alton B. Parker Democratic		Eugene V. Debs Socialist		Silas C. Swallow Prohibition		Various candidates Other parties		Margin		Total votes cast
County	#	%	#	%	#	%	#	%	#	%	#	%	Total votes cast
Belknap	2,867	60.31%	1,761	37.04%	19	0.40%	101	2.12%	6	0.13%	1,106	23.26%	4,754
Carroll	2,594	59.78%	1,683	38.79%	19	0.44%	42	0.97%	1	0.02%	911	21.00%	4,339
Cheshire	4,364	66.63%	2,002	30.56%	130	1.98%	46	0.70%	8	0.12%	2,362	36.06%	6,550
Coös	3,343	59.07%	2,241	39.60%	24	0.42%	41	0.72%	10	0.18%	1,102	19.47%	5,659
Grafton	6,100	62.55%	3,496	35.85%	55	0.56%	92	0.94%	9	0.09%	2,604	26.70%	9,752
Hillsborough	12,603	57.54%	8,831	40.32%	332	1.52%	115	0.53%	23	0.11%	3,772	17.22%	21,904
Merrimack	7,433	59.74%	4,740	38.09%	139	1.12%	122	0.98%	9	0.07%	2,693	21.64%	12,443
Rockingham	7,216	60.97%	4,320	36.50%	164	1.39%	120	1.01%	15	0.13%	2,896	24.47%	11,835
Strafford	4,869	56.58%	3,553	41.29%	138	1.60%	43	0.50%	2	0.02%	1,316	15.29%	8,605
Sullivan	2,774	64.21%	1,447	33.50%	70	1.62%	28	0.65%	1	0.02%	1,327	30.72%	4,320
Total	54,163	60.07%	34,074	37.79%	1,090	1.21%	750	0.83%	84	0.09%	20,089	22.28%	90,161

== See also ==
- United States presidential elections in New Hampshire
