= Grafton County, New Hampshire =

County in the United States

- County
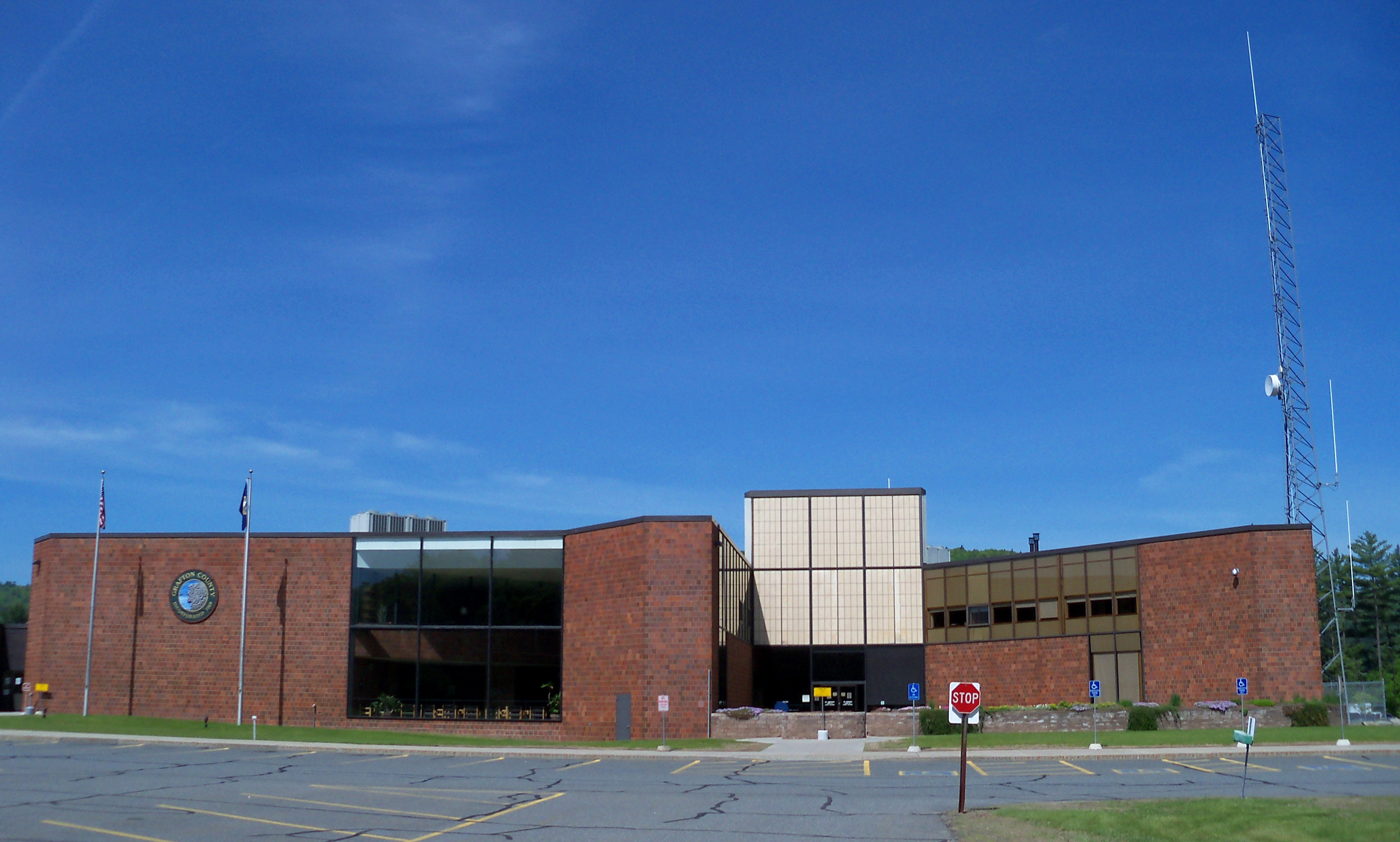
- Grafton County Courthouse in Haverhill

- Seal

- Location within the U.S. state of New Hampshire
- Coordinates: 43°53′46″N 71°53′41″W
- Country: United States
- State: New Hampshire
- Founded: 1769
- Named for: Augustus FitzRoy, 3rd Duke of Grafton
- Seat: Haverhill
- Largest city: Lebanon

Area
  - Total: 1,749.7 sq mi (4,532 km^{2})
  - Land: 1,708.6 sq mi (4,425 km^{2})
  - Water: 41.1 sq mi (106 km^{2}) 2.3%

Population (2020)
  - Total: 91,118
  - Estimate (2025): 93,225 ▲
  - Density: 53.3/sq mi (20.6/km^{2})
- Time zone: UTC−5 (Eastern)
  - Summer (DST): UTC−4 (EDT)
- Congressional districts: 1st, 2nd
- Website: https://grafton-county.com/

Grafton County is a county in the U.S. state of New Hampshire. As of the 2020 census, the population was 91,118. Its county seat is the town of Haverhill. In 1972, the county courthouse and other offices were moved from Woodsville, a larger village within the town of Haverhill, to North Haverhill.

Grafton County is part of the Claremont-Lebanon, NH–VT Micropolitan Statistical Area.

The county is the home of Dartmouth College and Plymouth State University. Progressive Farmer rated Grafton County fourth in its list of the "Best Places to Live in Rural America" in 2006, citing low unemployment (despite slow economic growth), a favorable cost of living, and the presence of White Mountain National Forest, the state's only national forest.

== History ==
Grafton was one of the five counties originally identified for New Hampshire in 1769. It was named for Augustus FitzRoy, 3rd Duke of Grafton, who had been a supporter of American causes in Parliament, and who was serving as British Prime Minister at the time. The county was organized at Haverhill in 1771, and originally included the entire northern frontier of New Hampshire, including several towns now in Vermont. In 1803, the northern area was removed for the formation of Coos County. The three counties to the south were Strafford, Hillsborough and Cheshire, and the eastern edge bordered the "District of Maine". In 1797, the county had 50 townships, 17 locations, and a population of 23,093.

== Geography ==
According to the United States Census Bureau, the county has a total area of 1,750 square miles (4,500 km^{2}), of which 1,709 square miles (4,430 km^{2}) are land and 41 square miles (110 km^{2}) (2.3%) are water. It is the second-largest county in New Hampshire by area.

Grafton County is heavily rural. About half of its area is in the White Mountain National Forest. Squam Lake, featured in the film On Golden Pond, and the Old Man of the Mountain landmark are here, as are Dartmouth College and the Hubbard Brook Experimental Forest. Many of the 4,000-foot mountains of New Hampshire are within the county. The Appalachian Trail passes through parts of at least ten towns in the county.

=== Adjacent counties ===
- Essex County, Vermont (north)
- Coös County (northeast)
- Carroll County (east)
- Belknap County (southeast)
- Merrimack County (south)
- Sullivan County (south)
- Windsor County, Vermont (southwest)
- Orange County, Vermont (west)
- Caledonia County, Vermont (northwest)

=== National protected area ===
- White Mountain National Forest (part)

== Demographics ==
Historical population
Census	Pop.	Note	%±
1790	13,468		—
1800	23,093		71.5%
1810	28,462		23.2%
1820	32,989		15.9%
1830	38,682		17.3%
1840	42,311		9.4%
1850	42,343		0.1%
1860	42,260		−0.2%
1870	39,103		−7.5%
1880	38,788		−0.8%
1890	37,217		−4.1%
1900	40,844		9.7%
1910	41,652		2.0%
1920	40,572		−2.6%
1930	42,816		5.5%
1940	44,645		4.3%
1950	47,923		7.3%
1960	48,857		1.9%
1970	54,914		12.4%
1980	65,806		19.8%
1990	74,929		13.9%
2000	81,743		9.1%
2010	89,118		9.0%
2020	91,118		2.2%
2025 (est.)	93,225	▲	2.3%
U.S. Decennial Census; 1790-1960 1900-1990; 1990-2000 2010-2018

=== 2020 census ===
As of the 2020 census, the county had a population of 91,118. The median age was 43.7 years. 15.8% of residents were under the age of 18 and 21.7% of residents were 65 years of age or older. For every 100 females there were 98.1 males, and for every 100 females age 18 and over there were 96.6 males age 18 and over.

The racial makeup of the county was 89.2% White, 0.9% Black or African American, 0.2% American Indian and Alaska Native, 3.1% Asian, 0.0% Native Hawaiian and Pacific Islander, 1.0% from some other race, and 5.5% from two or more races. Hispanic or Latino residents of any race comprised 2.8% of the population.

34.3% of residents lived in urban areas, while 65.7% lived in rural areas.

There were 37,683 households in the county, of which 21.7% had children under the age of 18 living with them and 25.0% had a female householder with no spouse or partner present. About 31.2% of all households were made up of individuals and 13.6% had someone living alone who was 65 years of age or older.

There were 50,840 housing units, of which 25.9% were vacant. Among occupied housing units, 68.0% were owner-occupied and 32.0% were renter-occupied. The homeowner vacancy rate was 1.5% and the rental vacancy rate was 7.1%.

Grafton County, New Hampshire – Racial and ethnic composition Note: the US Census treats Hispanic/Latino as an ethnic category. This table excludes Latinos from the racial categories and assigns them to a separate category. Hispanics/Latinos may be of any race.
Race / Ethnicity (NH = Non-Hispanic)	Pop 2000	Pop 2010	Pop 2020	% 2000	% 2010	% 2020
White alone (NH)	77,730	82,294	80,370	95.09%	92.34%	88.20%
Black or African American alone (NH)	419	768	783	0.51%	0.86%	0.85%
Native American or Alaska Native alone (NH)	240	307	180	0.29%	0.34%	0.19%
Asian alone (NH)	1,399	2,618	2,855	1.71%	2.93%	3.13%
Pacific Islander alone (NH)	21	16	24	0.02%	0.01%	0.02%
Other race alone (NH)	88	100	368	0.10%	0.11%	0.40%
Mixed race or Multiracial (NH)	932	1,415	3,959	1.14%	1.58%	4.34%
Hispanic or Latino (any race)	914	1,600	2,579	1.11%	1.79%	2.83%
Total	81,743	89,118	91,118	100.00%	100.00%	100.00%

=== 2010 census ===
As of the 2010 United States census, there were 89,118 people, 35,986 households, and 22,074 families in the county. The population density was 52.2 inhabitants per square mile (20.2 inhabitants/km^{2}). There were 51,120 housing units at an average density of 29.9 units per square mile (11.5 units/km^{2}). The county's racial makeup was 93.6% white, 3.0% Asian, 0.9% black or African American, 0.4% American Indian, 0.4% from other races, and 1.8% from two or more races. Those of Hispanic or Latino origin made up 1.8% of the population. In terms of ancestry, 23.6% were English, 18.7% were Irish, 10.9% were German, 6.6% were Italian, 5.8% were Scottish, 5.8% were French Canadian, and 5.0% were American.

Of the 35,986 households, 25.8% had children under the age of 18 living with them, 49.0% were married couples living together, 8.4% had a female householder with no husband present, 38.7% were non-families, and 29.4% of all households were made up of individuals. The average household size was 2.28 and the average family size was 2.80. The median age was 41.2 years.

The median household income was $53,075 and the median family income was $66,253. Males had a median income of $43,566 versus $33,535 for females. The per capita income for the county was $28,170. About 5.1% of families and 9.8% of the population were below the poverty line, including 9.8% of those under age 18 and 10.6% of those age 65 or over.

=== 2000 census ===
As of the census of 2000, 81,743 people, 31,598 households, and 20,254 families resided in the county. The population density was 48 inhabitants per square mile (19 inhabitants/km^{2}). There were 43,729 housing units at an average density of 26 units per square mile (10/km^{2}). The county's racial makeup was 95.76% White, 1.73% Asian, 0.53% Black or African American, 0.31% Native American, 0.03% Pacific Islander, 0.39% from other races, and 1.26% from two or more races. 1.12% of the population were Hispanic or Latino of any race. 19.0% were of English, 12.9% Irish, 11.1% French, 7.8% American, 7.5% German, 6.8% French Canadian and 5.5% Italian ancestry. 95.1% spoke English, 1.5% French and 1.3% Spanish as their first language.

There were 31,598 households, of which 29.50% had children under the age of 18 living with them, 52.40% were married couples living together, 8.30% had a female householder with no husband present, and 35.90% were non-families. 27.40% of all households were made up of individuals, and 9.50% had someone living alone who was 65 years of age or older. The average household size was 2.38 and the average family size was 2.90.

In the county, the population was spread out, with 21.90% under the age of 18, 13.50% from 18 to 24, 27.00% from 25 to 44, 24.20% from 45 to 64, and 13.40% who were 65 years of age or older. The median age was 37 years. For every 100 females, there were 96.70 males. For every 100 females age 18 and over, there were 94.30 males.

The county's median household income was $41,962, and the median family income was $50,424. Males had a median income of $31,874 versus $25,286 for females. The per capita income for the county was $22,227. About 5.10% of families and 8.60% of the population were below the poverty line, including 8.60% of those under age 18 and 7.50% of those age 65 or over.

== Politics and government ==
In the 2000 United States presidential election, Al Gore narrowly carried the county over George W. Bush, taking 47.31% of the vote to Bush's 46.71%. Other candidates got a combined 5.98%. In 2004 John Kerry prevailed over Bush by a wider margin: Kerry received 55.74% of the vote, while Bush received 43.17%. In 2008, Barack Obama carried Grafton by a landslide, receiving 63.03% of the vote to John McCain's 35.45%. It was Obama's highest percentage by county in New Hampshire. In 2016, Hillary Clinton won this county with 55.7%, while Donald Trump received 37.1% of the vote. It was Clinton's highest percentage by county in New Hampshire. In 2024, the county was the only one in the state to vote for Nikki Haley rather than Donald Trump in the state's Republican presidential primary.

United States presidential election results for Grafton County, New Hampshire
Year	Republican		Democratic		Third party(ies)	
Year	No.	%	No.	%	No.	%
1876	4,763	48.33%	5,092	51.66%	1	0.01%
1880	4,964	47.71%	5,300	50.94%	140	1.35%
1884	5,171	50.30%	4,917	47.83%	193	1.88%
1888	5,209	49.28%	5,170	48.91%	191	1.81%
1892	4,828	49.25%	4,794	48.90%	182	1.86%
1896	6,199	68.15%	2,306	25.35%	591	6.50%
1900	6,177	61.71%	3,619	36.15%	214	2.14%
1904	6,100	62.55%	3,496	35.85%	156	1.60%
1908	6,323	62.60%	3,582	35.46%	196	1.94%
1912	3,520	36.70%	3,752	39.12%	2,318	24.17%
1916	4,795	50.38%	4,644	48.80%	78	0.82%
1920	9,650	61.10%	6,102	38.63%	42	0.27%
1924	10,493	64.12%	5,360	32.75%	511	3.12%
1928	12,566	66.99%	6,035	32.17%	158	0.84%
1932	10,810	55.94%	8,342	43.17%	171	0.88%
1936	11,336	56.63%	8,520	42.57%	160	0.80%
1940	11,478	54.04%	9,761	45.96%	0	0.00%
1944	10,947	55.58%	8,743	44.39%	7	0.04%
1948	12,248	63.52%	6,841	35.48%	192	1.00%
1952	15,937	72.24%	6,124	27.76%	0	0.00%
1956	15,609	74.04%	5,466	25.93%	6	0.03%
1960	14,454	64.89%	7,821	35.11%	0	0.00%
1964	8,461	40.24%	12,566	59.76%	0	0.00%
1968	12,881	59.76%	7,813	36.25%	860	3.99%
1972	16,605	65.58%	8,388	33.13%	326	1.29%
1976	14,430	60.34%	8,996	37.62%	488	2.04%
1980	15,273	56.25%	7,282	26.82%	4,596	16.93%
1984	18,451	67.59%	8,757	32.08%	92	0.34%
1988	19,033	62.00%	11,484	37.41%	182	0.59%
1992	13,450	37.01%	15,389	42.34%	7,504	20.65%
1996	13,543	38.95%	17,476	50.26%	3,753	10.79%
2000	18,092	46.71%	18,326	47.31%	2,315	5.98%
2004	20,277	43.17%	26,180	55.74%	514	1.09%
2008	17,687	35.45%	31,446	63.03%	757	1.52%
2012	18,208	37.15%	29,826	60.85%	980	2.00%
2016	19,010	37.14%	28,510	55.69%	3,671	7.17%
2020	19,905	36.77%	33,180	61.29%	1,047	1.93%
2024	21,909	39.20%	32,993	59.03%	993	1.78%

=== County Commission ===
The executive power of Grafton County's government is held by three county commissioners, each representing one of the three commissioner districts within the county.

District	Commissioner	Hometown	Party
1	Wendy Piper	Enfield	Republican
2	Martha Stroup McLeod	Franconia	Democratic
3	Omer Ahern Jr.	Wentworth	Republican

In addition to the County Commission, there are also five directly elected officials: they include County Attorney, Register of Deeds, County Sheriff, Register of Probate, and County Treasurer.

Office	Name
County Attorney	Martha Ann Hornick (D)
Register of Deeds	Kelley Monahan (R)
County Sheriff	Jeff Stiegler (D)
Register of Probate	Charles Townsend (D)
County Treasurer	Karen Liot Hill (D)

=== General court ===
The general court delegation of Grafton County is made up of all of the members of the New Hampshire House of Representatives from the county. There are 26 members from 18 different districts. After the 2022 elections, the party distribution of representatives was as follows.

Affiliation	Members	Voting share
Democratic Party	18	69.2%
Republican Party	8	30.8%
Total	27	100%

== Media ==
- WPNH - 1300 AM, Plymouth
- WTSL - 1400 AM, Hanover - News/Talk
- WLTN - 1400 AM, Littleton - Oldies - "Oldies 1400"
- WUVR - 1490 AM, Hanover - Talk
- W217BH - 91.3 FM, Littleton - New Hampshire Public Radio - Simulcast of WEVO in Concord, New Hampshire
- WEVH - 91.3 FM, Hanover - New Hampshire Public Radio
- WPCR - 91.7 FM, Plymouth - Plymouth State University
- WGXL - 92.3 FM, Hanover - Hot Adult Contemporary - "The Valley's Hit Music"
- W231BW - 94.1 FM, Littleton - Classic rock - "The Outlaw" - Simulcast of WOTX in Groveton
- W237CR - 95.3 FM, Littleton - Eclectic Music Mix (Hot AC/Rock/Dance) - "Kiss 102.3" - Simulcast of WXXS in Lancaster
- W240AK - 95.9 FM, Lebanon - Religious - "Alive Radio" - Simulcast of WBAR in Lake Luzerne, New York
- WLTN-FM - 96.7 FM, Lisbon - 1970s-1990s Adult Contemporary - "Mix 96.7"
- W245AF - 96.9 FM, Ashland - "New Hampshire Gospel Radio" - Simulcast of WVNH in Concord, New Hampshire
- W247AO - 97.3 FM, Plymouth - New Hampshire Public Radio - Simulcast of WEVO in Concord, New Hampshire
- W249AW - 97.7 FM, Lebanon - Religious - "Alive Radio" - Simulcast of WBAR in Lake Luzerne, New York
- WFRD - 99.3 FM, Hanover - Active Rock - "99 Rock"
- WPNH - 100.1 FM, Plymouth - "The Planet"
- WXXK - 100.5 FM, Lebanon - Country - "Kixx Country"
- WYKR-FM - 101.3 FM, Haverhill - Country
- W272AU - 102.3 FM, Hanover - Classic rock - "Champ 101.3 & 102.1" - Simulcast of WVXR in Randolph, Vermont
- W280CS - 103.9 FM, Hanover - Vermont Public Radio Classical Channel - Simulcast of WVPR in Burlington, Vermont
- WLKC - 105.7 FM, Campton - "The River" - Simulcast of WXRV in Andover, Massachusetts
- WMTK - 106.3 FM, Littleton - Classic rock - "The Notch"
- W294AB - 106.7 FM, Hanover - Classic rock - "Q106" - Simulcast of WHDQ in Claremont, New Hampshire
- W299AM - 107.7 FM, Lebanon - Christian contemporary - "K-Love" - Simulcast of WZKC in Royalton, Vermont

(Compiled from Radiostationworld.com)

== Communities ==
=== City ===
- Lebanon

=== Towns ===
- Alexandria
- Ashland
- Bath
- Benton
- Bethlehem
- Bridgewater
- Bristol
- Campton
- Canaan
- Dorchester
- Easton
- Ellsworth
- Enfield
- Franconia
- Grafton
- Groton
- Hanover
- Haverhill (county seat)
- Hebron
- Holderness
- Landaff
- Lincoln
- Lisbon
- Littleton
- Lyman
- Lyme
- Monroe
- Orange
- Orford
- Piermont
- Plymouth
- Rumney
- Sugar Hill
- Thornton
- Warren
- Waterville Valley
- Wentworth
- Woodstock

=== Township ===
- Livermore

=== Census-designated places ===
- Ashland
- Bethlehem
- Bristol
- Canaan
- Enfield
- Hanover
- Lincoln
- Lisbon
- Littleton
- Mountain Lakes
- North Haverhill
- North Woodstock
- Plymouth
- Woodsville

=== Villages ===
- East Hebron
- Enfield Center
- Etna
- Glencliff
- Lyme Center
- Montcalm
- Pike
- Stinson Lake
- West Lebanon

== Education ==
School districts include:

Unified (K-12):

- Benton School District
- Ellsworth School District
- Haverhill Cooperative School District
- Lebanon School District
- Lincoln-Woodstock School District
- Lisbon Regional School District
- Littleton School District
- Mascoma Valley Regional School District
- Newfound Area School District
- Rivendell Interstate School District

Secondary:

- Dresden School District
- Profile School District
- Pemi-Baker Regional School District

Elementary:

- Ashland School District
- Bath School District
- Bethlehem School District
- Campton School District
- Hanover School District
- Holderness School District
- Lafayette Regional School District
- Landaff School District
- Lyme School District
- Monroe School District
- Piermont School District
- Plymouth School District
- Rumney School District
- Thornton School District
- Warren School District
- Waterville Valley School District
- Wentworth School District

== See also ==
- National Register of Historic Places listings in Grafton County, New Hampshire
