= Carroll County, New Hampshire =

County in New Hampshire, United States

- County
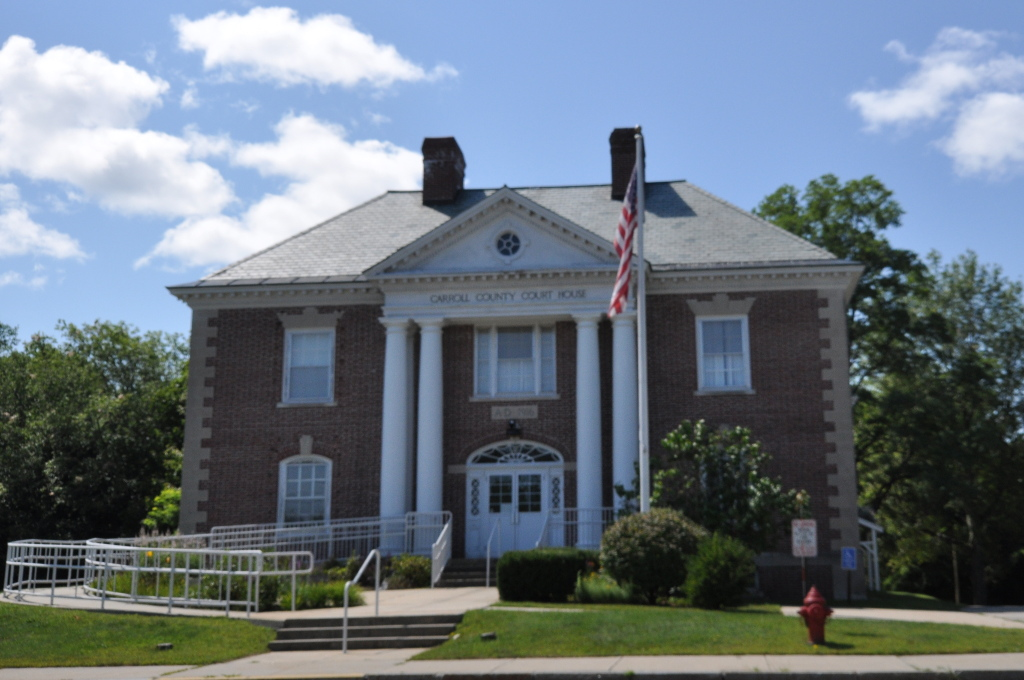
- Carroll County Court House

- Seal

- Location within the U.S. state of New Hampshire
- Coordinates: 43°49′21″N 71°10′54″W
- Country: United States
- State: New Hampshire
- Founded: 1840
- Named for: Charles Carroll of Carrollton
- Seat: Ossipee
- Largest town: Conway

Area
  - Total: 993.5 sq mi (2,573 km^{2})
  - Land: 931.9 sq mi (2,414 km^{2})
  - Water: 61.6 sq mi (160 km^{2}) 6.2%

Population (2020)
  - Total: 50,107
  - Estimate (2025): 52,784 ▲
  - Density: 53.8/sq mi (20.8/km^{2})
- Time zone: UTC−5 (Eastern)
  - Summer (DST): UTC−4 (EDT)
- Congressional district: 1st
- Website: carrollcountynh.gov

Carroll County is a county in the U.S. state of New Hampshire. As of the 2020 census, the population was 50,107, making it the third-least populous county in New Hampshire. Its county seat is Ossipee. The county was created in 1840 and organized at Ossipee from towns removed from Strafford County. It was named in honor of Charles Carroll of Carrollton, who had died in 1832, the last surviving signer of the United States Declaration of Independence.

== Geography ==
According to the U.S. Census Bureau, the county has a total area of 992 square miles (2,570 km^{2}), of which 931 square miles (2,410 km^{2}) is land and 61 square miles (160 km^{2}) (6.2%) is water. It is the third-largest county in New Hampshire by total area. Northern Carroll County is known for being mountainous. Several ski areas, including Cranmore Mountain, Attitash, King Pine, and Black Mountain, are located here. A salient along the northwestern margin of the county runs through Crawford Notch; the northern portion of the salient is within Crawford Notch State Park.

=== Adjacent counties ===
- Coös County (north)
- Oxford County, Maine (northeast)
- York County, Maine (southeast)
- Strafford County (south)
- Belknap County (southwest)
- Grafton County (west)

=== National protected area ===
- White Mountain National Forest (part)

== Demographics ==
Historical population
| Census | Pop. | Note | %± |
|---|---|---|---|
| 1850 | 20,157 | | — |
| 1860 | 20,465 | | 1.5% |
| 1870 | 17,332 | | −15.3% |
| 1880 | 18,224 | | 5.1% |
| 1890 | 18,124 | | −0.5% |
| 1900 | 16,895 | | −6.8% |
| 1910 | 16,316 | | −3.4% |
| 1920 | 15,017 | | −8.0% |
| 1930 | 14,277 | | −4.9% |
| 1940 | 15,589 | | 9.2% |
| 1950 | 15,868 | | 1.8% |
| 1960 | 15,829 | | −0.2% |
| 1970 | 18,548 | | 17.2% |
| 1980 | 27,931 | | 50.6% |
| 1990 | 35,410 | | 26.8% |
| 2000 | 43,666 | | 23.3% |
| 2010 | 47,818 | | 9.5% |
| 2020 | 50,107 | | 4.8% |
| 2025 (est.) | 52,784 | ▲ | 5.3% |
U.S. Decennial Census; 1790-1960 1900-1990; 1990-2000 2010-2018

=== 2020 census ===
As of the 2020 census, the county had a population of 50,107. The median age was 54.9 years. 15.0% of residents were under the age of 18 and 30.0% of residents were 65 years of age or older. For every 100 females there were 98.3 males, and for every 100 females age 18 and over there were 96.9 males age 18 and over.

The racial makeup of the county was 94.2% White, 0.3% Black or African American, 0.2% American Indian and Alaska Native, 0.7% Asian, 0.0% Native Hawaiian and Pacific Islander, 0.7% from some other race, and 3.9% from two or more races. Hispanic or Latino residents of any race comprised 1.5% of the population.

10.5% of residents lived in urban areas, while 89.5% lived in rural areas.

There were 22,667 households in the county, of which 19.3% had children under the age of 18 living with them and 22.6% had a female householder with no spouse or partner present. About 29.7% of all households were made up of individuals and 15.4% had someone living alone who was 65 years of age or older.

There were 39,670 housing units, of which 42.9% were vacant. Among occupied housing units, 81.9% were owner-occupied and 18.1% were renter-occupied. The homeowner vacancy rate was 1.4% and the rental vacancy rate was 13.7%.

Carroll County, New Hampshire – Racial and ethnic composition Note: the US Census treats Hispanic/Latino as an ethnic category. This table excludes Latinos from the racial categories and assigns them to a separate category. Hispanics/Latinos may be of any race.
| Race / Ethnicity (NH = Non-Hispanic) | Pop 2000 | Pop 2010 | Pop 2020 | % 2000 | % 2010 | % 2020 |
|---|---|---|---|---|---|---|
| White alone (NH) | 42,741 | 46,285 | 46,947 | 97.88% | 96.79% | 93.69% |
| Black or African American alone (NH) | 69 | 126 | 131 | 0.15% | 0.26% | 0.26% |
| Native American or Alaska Native alone (NH) | 120 | 122 | 100 | 0.27% | 0.25% | 0.19% |
| Asian alone (NH) | 164 | 297 | 358 | 0.37% | 0.62% | 0.71% |
| Pacific Islander alone (NH) | 4 | 7 | 6 | 0.00% | 0.01% | 0.01% |
| Other race alone (NH) | 41 | 25 | 206 | 0.09% | 0.05% | 0.41% |
| Mixed race or Multiracial (NH) | 318 | 483 | 1,590 | 0.72% | 1.01% | 3.17% |
| Hispanic or Latino (any race) | 209 | 473 | 769 | 0.47% | 0.98% | 1.53% |
| Total | 43,666 | 47,818 | 50,107 | 100.00% | 100.00% | 100.00% |

=== 2010 census ===
As of the 2010 United States census, there were 47,818 people, 21,052 households, and 13,569 families living in the county. The population density was 51.4 inhabitants per square mile (19.8/km^{2}). There were 39,813 housing units at an average density of 42.8 per square mile (16.5/km^{2}). The racial makeup of the county was 97.5% white, 0.6% Asian, 0.3% American Indian, 0.3% black or African American, 0.2% from other races, and 1.1% from two or more races. Those of Hispanic or Latino origin made up 1.0% of the population. In terms of ancestry,

The largest ancestry group in Carroll County are people of English ancestry, who make up 29.3% of people in the county. The second largest ancestry group in the county are people of Irish ancestry who make up 24.7%. The third largest group is people of French ancestry who make up 13.8% of people in the county.

Of the 21,052 households, 24.2% had children under the age of 18 living with them, 52.2% were married couples living together, 8.1% had a female householder with no husband present, 35.5% were non-families, and 28.4% of all households were made up of individuals. The average household size was 2.25 and the average family size was 2.72. The median age was 48.3 years.

The median income for a household in the county was $49,897 and the median income for a family was $60,086. Males had a median income of $41,634 versus $32,402 for females. The per capita income for the county was $28,411. About 6.1% of families and 9.6% of the population were below the poverty line, including 14.6% of those under age 18 and 5.5% of those age 65 or over.

=== 2000 census ===
As of the census of 2000, there were 43,666 people, 18,351 households, and 12,313 families living in the county. The population density was 18 people per square kilometre (47 people/mi^{2}). There were 34,750 housing units at an average density of 14/km^{2} (36/mi^{2}). The racial makeup of the county was 98.22% White, 0.17% Black or African American, 0.28% Native American, 0.38% Asian, 0.01% Pacific Islander, 0.17% from other races, and 0.77% from two or more races. 0.48% of the population were Hispanic or Latino of any race. 22.5% were of English, 15.6% Irish, 10.5% American, 9.7% French, 6.7% German, 5.8% Italian and 5.2% Scottish ancestry. 96.5% spoke English and 1.6% French as their first language.

There were 18,351 households, out of which 27.40% had children under the age of 18 living with them, 55.30% were married couples living together, 7.80% had a female householder with no husband present, and 32.90% were non-families. 26.60% of all households were made up of individuals, and 11.10% had someone living alone who was 65 years of age or older. The average household size was 2.35 and the average family size was 2.82.

In the county, the population was spread out, with 22.60% under the age of 18, 5.30% from 18 to 24, 26.50% from 25 to 44, 27.70% from 45 to 64, and 17.80% who were 65 years of age or older. The median age was 42 years. For every 100 females there were 96.60 males. For every 100 females age 18 and over, there were 94.20 males.

The median income for a household in the county was $39,990, and the median income for a family was $46,922. Males had a median income of $31,811 versus $23,922 for females. The per capita income for the county was $21,931. About 5.50% of families and 7.90% of the population were below the poverty line, including 10.00% of those under age 18 and 6.70% of those age 65 or over.

== Politics and government ==
The county is historically Republican and was the only county in all of New England to vote for Barry Goldwater in 1964. In 2008 Barack Obama received 52.39% of the county's vote, making him the first Democratic presidential nominee to win the county since 1912 and the first Democratic presidential nominee to win an absolute majority in the county since 1884. Joe Biden later repeated this feat in 2020. However, despite the recent Democratic trend, the county has not voted more Democratic than the nation since 1888 in terms of two-party vote.

The county is politically divided between the more conservative southern half, home to several seasonal communities along the north shore of Lake Winnipesaukee including Moultonborough, Tuftonboro, and Wolfeboro, and the more liberal northern half, with several ski towns and resort towns such as Bartlett and Conway. In both the 2012 Presidential and gubernatorial elections in New Hampshire, Democratic candidates easily won the northern half of the county, and Republican candidates easily won the southern half of the county.

Carroll County is one of only thirteen counties to have voted for Obama in 2008, Romney in 2012, Trump in 2016, and Biden in 2020. (Note: The other twelve are Butte County, California; Teton County, Idaho; Kent County, Maryland; Kendall County, Illinois; McLean County, Illinois; Tippecanoe County, Indiana; Kent County, Michigan; Leelanau County, Michigan; Rockingham County, New Hampshire; Marion County, Oregon; Grand County, Utah; and Albany County, Wyoming.)

United States presidential election results for Carroll County, New Hampshire
| Year | Republican | | Democratic | | Third party(ies) | |
| Year | No. | % | No. | % | No. | % |
|---|---|---|---|---|---|---|
| 1876 | 2,016 | 44.87% | 2,474 | 55.06% | 3 | 0.07% |
| 1880 | 2,426 | 47.46% | 2,639 | 51.62% | 47 | 0.92% |
| 1884 | 2,286 | 46.95% | 2,443 | 50.17% | 140 | 2.88% |
| 1888 | 2,338 | 47.39% | 2,434 | 49.33% | 162 | 3.28% |
| 1892 | 2,253 | 48.82% | 2,267 | 49.12% | 95 | 2.06% |
| 1896 | 2,800 | 65.88% | 1,214 | 28.56% | 236 | 5.55% |
| 1900 | 2,626 | 57.26% | 1,859 | 40.54% | 101 | 2.20% |
| 1904 | 2,594 | 59.78% | 1,683 | 38.79% | 62 | 1.43% |
| 1908 | 2,562 | 60.74% | 1,591 | 37.72% | 65 | 1.54% |
| 1912 | 1,454 | 34.45% | 1,820 | 43.12% | 947 | 22.44% |
| 1916 | 2,259 | 52.61% | 2,003 | 46.65% | 32 | 0.75% |
| 1920 | 4,214 | 64.73% | 2,279 | 35.01% | 17 | 0.26% |
| 1924 | 4,372 | 65.40% | 2,213 | 33.10% | 100 | 1.50% |
| 1928 | 5,509 | 77.41% | 1,592 | 22.37% | 16 | 0.22% |
| 1932 | 5,269 | 64.56% | 2,873 | 35.20% | 19 | 0.23% |
| 1936 | 5,521 | 66.32% | 2,769 | 33.26% | 35 | 0.42% |
| 1940 | 5,656 | 66.34% | 2,870 | 33.66% | 0 | 0.00% |
| 1944 | 5,251 | 68.08% | 2,461 | 31.91% | 1 | 0.01% |
| 1948 | 6,127 | 76.11% | 1,869 | 23.22% | 54 | 0.67% |
| 1952 | 7,498 | 82.61% | 1,578 | 17.39% | 0 | 0.00% |
| 1956 | 7,527 | 85.38% | 1,281 | 14.53% | 8 | 0.09% |
| 1960 | 7,487 | 79.61% | 1,918 | 20.39% | 0 | 0.00% |
| 1964 | 4,957 | 54.99% | 4,058 | 45.01% | 0 | 0.00% |
| 1968 | 6,795 | 72.93% | 2,163 | 23.22% | 359 | 3.85% |
| 1972 | 8,525 | 77.01% | 2,395 | 21.64% | 150 | 1.36% |
| 1976 | 8,561 | 70.18% | 3,374 | 27.66% | 263 | 2.16% |
| 1980 | 9,980 | 67.25% | 3,119 | 21.02% | 1,742 | 11.74% |
| 1984 | 11,891 | 75.43% | 3,806 | 24.14% | 67 | 0.43% |
| 1988 | 12,983 | 70.78% | 5,153 | 28.09% | 208 | 1.13% |
| 1992 | 8,715 | 40.16% | 7,258 | 33.44% | 5,730 | 26.40% |
| 1996 | 9,168 | 44.16% | 8,881 | 42.77% | 2,714 | 13.07% |
| 2000 | 12,597 | 52.75% | 9,852 | 41.26% | 1,430 | 5.99% |
| 2004 | 14,614 | 51.78% | 13,319 | 47.19% | 289 | 1.02% |
| 2008 | 13,387 | 46.07% | 15,221 | 52.39% | 448 | 1.54% |
| 2012 | 14,207 | 49.67% | 13,977 | 48.87% | 418 | 1.46% |
| 2016 | 14,635 | 49.42% | 12,987 | 43.85% | 1,994 | 6.73% |
| 2020 | 16,150 | 48.50% | 16,649 | 50.00% | 498 | 1.50% |
| 2024 | 17,426 | 50.28% | 16,822 | 48.54% | 410 | 1.18% |

=== County Commission ===
The executive power of Carroll County's government is held by three county commissioners, each representing one of the three commissioner districts within the county.

| District | Commissioner | Hometown | Party |
|---|---|---|---|
| 1 | Chuck McGee (chair) | Moultonborough, New Hampshire | Republican |
| 2 | Harold Parker (vice-chair) | Wolfeboro, New Hampshire | Republican |
| 3 | Terry McCarthy (clerk) | Conway, New Hampshire | Republican |

In addition to the County Commission, there are five directly elected officials: they include County Attorney, Register of Deeds, County Sheriff, Register of Probate, and County Treasurer.

| Office | Name |
|---|---|
| County Attorney | Keith Blair (R) |
| Register of Deeds | Karen Rines (R) |
| County Sheriff | Domenic Richardi (R) |
| County Treasurer | Matt Sawyer (R) |
| Register of Probate | Meg Lavender (R) |

=== Legislative branch ===
The legislative branch of Carroll County is made up of all of the members of the New Hampshire House of Representatives from the county. In total, as of January 2021 there are 15 members from 8 different districts.

| Affiliation | Members | Voting share |
|---|---|---|
| Democratic Party | 5 | 33.3% |
| Republican Party | 10 | 66.7% |
| Total | 15 | 100% |

== Communities ==
=== Towns ===
- Albany
- Bartlett
- Brookfield
- Chatham
- Conway
- Eaton
- Effingham
- Freedom
- Hart's Location
- Jackson
- Madison
- Moultonborough
- Ossipee (county seat)
- Sandwich
- Tamworth
- Tuftonboro
- Wakefield
- Wolfeboro

=== Township ===
- Hale's Location

=== Census-designated places ===
- Bartlett
- Center Ossipee
- Center Sandwich
- Conway
- Melvin Village
- North Conway
- Sanbornville
- Suissevale
- Union
- Wolfeboro

=== Other unincorporated communities ===
- Center Conway
- Chocorua
- East Conway
- East Wakefield
- Eidelweiss
- Ferncroft
- Glen
- Intervale
- Kearsarge
- Lees Mill
- Mirror Lake
- North Sandwich
- Redstone
- Silver Lake
- South Tamworth
- West Ossipee
- Wolfeboro Falls
- Wonalancet

== See also ==
- Bartlett and Albany Railroad
- National Register of Historic Places listings in Carroll County, New Hampshire
