= 1972 United States presidential election in New Hampshire =

- November 7, 1972

Nominee	Richard Nixon	George McGovern
Party	Republican	Democratic
Home state	California	South Dakota
Running mate	Spiro Agnew	Sargent Shriver
Electoral vote	4	0
Popular vote	213,724	116,435
Percentage	63.98%	34.85%

Nixon
40–50%
50–60%
60–70%
70–80%
80–90%
90–100%
McGovern
40–50%
50–60%
60–70%
90–100%
Tie
40–50%
50%
President before election
Richard Nixon
Republican
Elected President
Richard Nixon
Republican

The 1972 United States presidential election in New Hampshire took place on November 7, 1972, as part of the 1972 United States presidential election, which was held throughout all 50 states and D.C. Voters chose four representatives, or electors to the Electoral College, who voted for president and vice president.

New Hampshire was won by the Republican nominees, incumbent President Richard Nixon of California and his running mate incumbent Vice President Spiro Agnew of Maryland. Nixon and Agnew defeated the Democratic nominees, Senator George McGovern of South Dakota and his running mate United States Ambassador Sargent Shriver of Maryland.

Nixon took 63.98% of the vote to McGovern's 34.85%, a margin of 29.12%. New Hampshire in this era normally leaned Republican, having not gone Democratic since the nationwide Democratic landslide of 1964. As Nixon won re-election nationally in a 49-state landslide, New Hampshire easily remained in the Republican column, with McGovern's only victories coming from neighboring Massachusetts and the District of Columbia.

On the county map, Nixon swept all 10 of the state's counties, breaking 60% in 7 of them. As in previous elections, Carroll County and Belknap County were the most Republican counties in the state, both voting over 70% for Nixon. McGovern's strongest county was Strafford County, where he managed 41.3% of the vote to Nixon's 57.8%.

Amidst Nixon's landslide nationwide win, New Hampshire would weigh in as almost 6% more Republican than the national average, and would be the most Republican state in the Northeast. Nixon had previously won New Hampshire in both 1960 and 1968.

== Results ==
1972 United States presidential election in New Hampshire
Party	Candidate	Votes	Percentage	Electoral votes
Republican	Richard Nixon (inc.)	213,724	63.98%	4
Democratic	George McGovern	116,435	34.85%	0
American Independent	John G. Schmitz	3,386	1.01%	0
Socialist Workers	Linda Jenness	368	0.11%	0
Write-ins	Write-ins	146	0.04%	0
Totals		334,059	100.00%	4
Voter Turnout (Voting age/Registered)				64%/74%

=== Results by county ===
County	Richard Nixon Republican		George McGovern Democratic		John G. Schmitz American Independent		Various candidates Other parties		Margin		Total votes cast
County	#	%	#	%	#	%	#	%	#	%	Total votes cast
Belknap	11,536	70.72%	4,610	28.26%	143	0.88%	23	0.14%	6,926	42.46%	16,312
Carroll	8,525	77.01%	2,395	21.64%	128	1.16%	22	0.20%	6,130	55.37%	11,070
Cheshire	13,390	58.98%	9,157	40.33%	132	0.58%	24	0.11%	4,233	18.65%	22,703
Coös	9,468	60.84%	5,829	37.45%	204	1.31%	62	0.40%	3,639	23.39%	15,563
Grafton	16,605	65.58%	8,388	33.13%	288	1.14%	38	0.15%	8,217	32.45%	25,319
Hillsborough	65,274	64.39%	34,739	34.27%	1,258	1.24%	106	0.10%	30,535	30.12%	101,377
Merrimack	25,354	67.70%	11,737	31.34%	308	0.82%	50	0.13%	13,617	36.36%	37,453
Rockingham	38,825	63.09%	21,998	35.75%	615	1.00%	103	0.17%	16,827	27.34%	61,541
Strafford	16,846	57.83%	12,028	41.29%	188	0.65%	67	0.23%	4,818	16.54%	29,129
Sullivan	7,901	58.13%	5,554	40.86%	122	0.90%	15	0.11%	2,347	17.27%	13,592
Totals	213,724	63.98%	116,435	34.85%	3,386	1.01%	514	0.15%	97,289	29.13%	334,059

== See also ==
- Presidency of Richard Nixon
- Presidency of Gerald Ford
- United States presidential elections in New Hampshire
