= 2016 New Hampshire elections =

New Hampshire state elections in 2016 were held on Tuesday, November 8, 2016. Voters elected 4 electors in the electoral college for President of the United States, one Senator in the United States Senate, 2 members to the United States House of Representatives, the Governor of New Hampshire, all five members to the Executive Council, all 24 members to the New Hampshire Senate, and all 400 members to the New Hampshire House of Representatives, among other local elected offices. The Democratic and Republican presidential primary were held on February 9, 2016, and the primary elections for all others offices were held on September 13, 2016.

== President of the United States ==
=== Primary elections ===
==== Republican presidential primary ====
Donald Trump won the 2016 New Hampshire Republican primary by around 55,800 votes (19.51%). Trump went on to win the 2016 Republican presidential primaries and was nominated by the 2016 Republican National Convention in Cleveland on July 19, 2016.

==== Democratic presidential primary ====
Bernie Sanders won the 2016 New Hampshire Democratic primary by around 56,800 votes (22.46%). Hillary Clinton went on to win the 2016 Democratic presidential primaries and was nominated by the 2016 Democratic National Convention in Philadelphia on July 26, 2016.

=== General election ===
Hillary Clinton was able to carry New Hampshire in the 2016 United States Presidential election by around 2,700 votes (0.37%). Donald Trump was elected as 45th President of the United States.

General election results, November 8, 2016
Party	Candidate	Votes	%
Democratic	Hillary Clinton	348,526	47.62%
Republican	Donald Trump	345,790	47.25%
Libertarian	Gary Johnson	30,694	4.13%
Green	Jill Stein	6,465	0.87%
Independent	Evan McMullin (write-in)	1,064	0.15%
Reform	Rocky De La Fuente	677	0.1%
n/a	Total Other Write-in	10,965	1.47%
Total votes		743,117	100.00%

== United States Congress ==
=== Senate ===
New Hampshire's Class 3 Senate seat was up for election. Republican incumbent Kelly Ayotte was defeated by Democratic governor Maggie Hassan.

United States Senate election in New Hampshire, 2016
Party	Candidate	Votes	%	±%
Democratic	Maggie Hassan	354,649	47.99%	+11.25%
Republican	Kelly Ayotte (incumbent)	353,632	47.84%	−12.32%
Independent	Aaron Day	17,742	2.40%	N/A
Libertarian	Brian Chabot	12,597	1.70%	+0.65%
n/a	Write-ins	520	0.07%	N/A
Total votes		'739,140'	'100.0%'	N/A
Democratic gain from Republican				

=== House of Representatives ===
New Hampshire's two seats in the United States House of Representatives were up for election. Both seats were retained by the Democratic Party.

== State's constitutional offices ==
=== Governor ===
Incumbent Democrat Maggie Hassan did not run for reelection. She ran for United States Senate instead. The open seat was won by Republican nominee Chris Sununu against Democrat Colin Van Ostern and Libertarian Max Abramson.

New Hampshire's gubernatorial election, 2016
Party	Candidate	Votes	%	±%
Republican	Chris Sununu	354,040	48.84%	+1.41%
Democratic	Colin Van Ostern	337,589	46.57%	−5.81%
Libertarian	Max Abramson	31,243	4.31%	N/A
n/a	Write-ins	1,991	0.28%	+0.09%
Total votes		'724,863'	'100.0%'	N/A
Republican gain from Democratic				

=== Executive council ===
All 5 seats of the New Hampshire Executive Council were up for election. Republican retained their 3–2 majority.

== State Legislature ==
=== State Senate ===
All 24 seats of the New Hampshire Senate were up for election. Republican retained their 14–10 majority.

=== State House of Representatives ===
All 400 seats of the New Hampshire House of Representatives were up for election. Democrats were able to gain 16 seats but Republicans maintained a majority by a 217–176 majority.
