= Coos County Democrat =

Newspaper in Lancaster, New Hampshire, US

Coös County Democrat
- Type: Weekly newspaper
- Format: Broadsheet
- Owner(s): Salmon Press Newspapers, LLC
- Founder(s): James Madison Rix
- Editor: Tara Giles
- Founded: 1838
- Headquarters: 79 Main Street, Lancaster, New Hampshire 03584
- Circulation: 4,945
- OCLC number: 21551242
- Website: newhampshirelakesandmountains.com

The Coös County Democrat (/'koʊɒs/ with two syllables) is a weekly newspaper located in Lancaster, New Hampshire. It has a circulation of 4,945.

== History ==
The Democrat was established in 1838 by James Madison Rix. His operation ran out of a small room above Kent's dry goods store on Main Street in Lancaster. Not by coincidence, the first newspaper to appear in Lancaster had been established earlier that year; Richard P. Kent's White Mountains Aegis represented the Whig Party of Coös County. The Democrat was established to serve the Coös County Democrats by opposition. James Rix employed teenage boys as apprentices, as there were not many other jobs besides farming and professional trades in northern New Hampshire. Rix taught them the printer's trade as well as the ideology of the New Hampshire Democratic Party, predominantly the party's contempt for African Americans and abolitionists.

Among the apprentices was Edward E. Cross, who Rix appointed as the foreman of the paper in 1847. The same year a young Charles Farrar Browne came to work for the Democrat, his mother sending him from Maine in a stagecoach. Browne proved to be too rambunctious for the editor, and ultimately Rix fired him. After his termination he became a humor columnist for The Plain Dealer under his pen name, Artemus Ward, which is the name he continued to use throughout his comedy career.

James Rix remained editor until his death in 1856, upon which editorship shifted to Jared I. Williams, then to Charles D. Johnson. In 1859, Johnson moved the paper to North Stratford, and when he died a year later, the Democrat ceased publication. A portion of the plant materials were sold to Henry O. Kent, who used them to publish the Coös Republican out of the same office the Democrat first published from in 1838.

In 1884, F. A. Kehew published the next edition of the Coös County Democrat, using the title and serial number of the last paper published over 20 years previously.

In September 2024, Salmon Press merged the Berlin Reporter into the Coös County Democrat.

== Owner ==
The Democrat has been owned by Salmon Press LLC since David Cutler and John Coots bought the weekly in 2001. Salmon Press owns newspapers across New Hampshire, including:

- The Baysider
- Berlin Reporter
- Carroll County Independent
- Gilford Steamer
- Granite State News
- Littleton Courier
- Meredith News
- Newfound Landing
- Plymouth Record Enterprise
- Winnisquam Echo
