= 1948 United States presidential election in New Hampshire =

Presidential election in 1948

- November 2, 1948
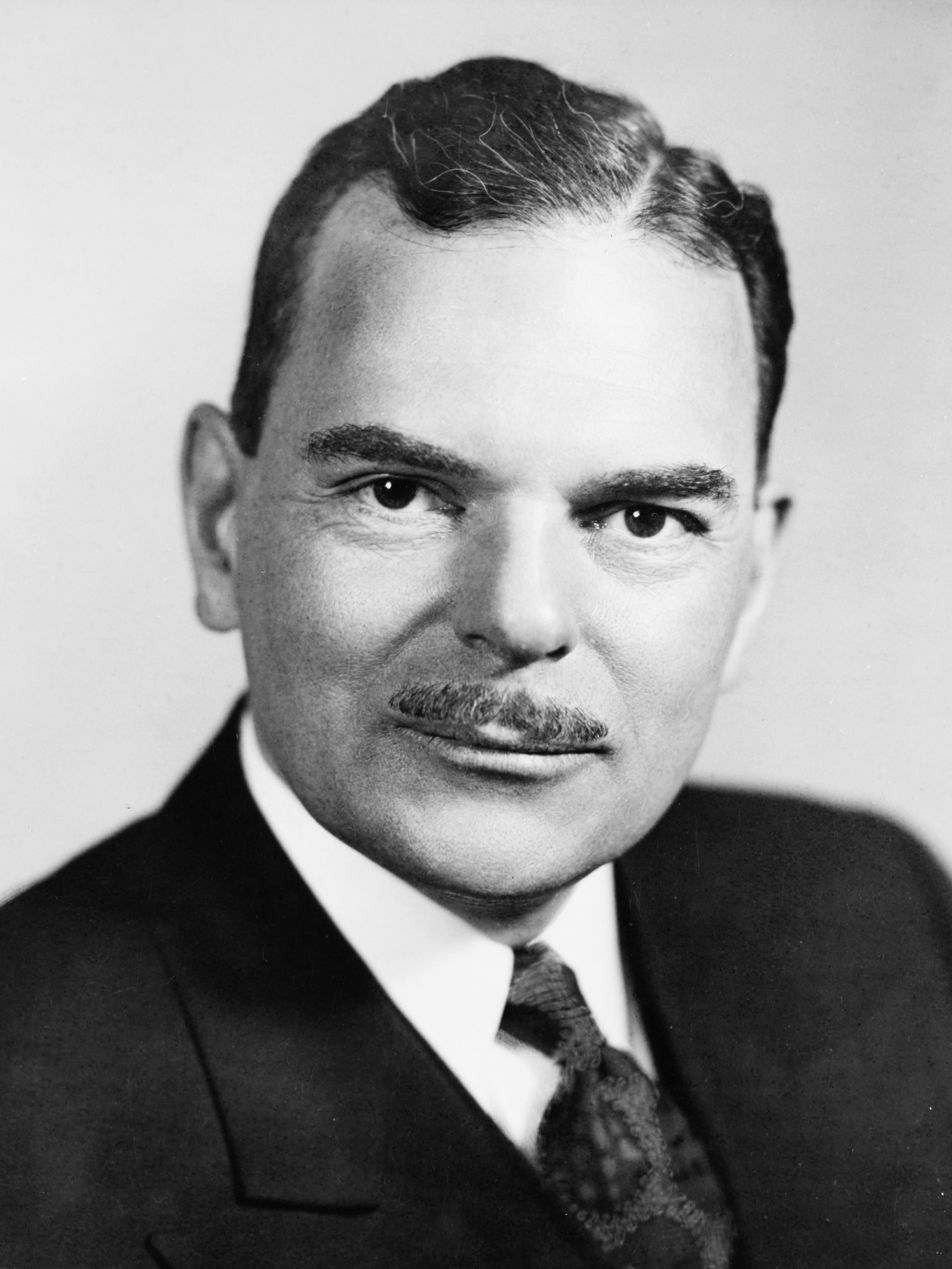

| Nominee | Thomas E. Dewey | Harry S. Truman |
| Party | Republican | Democratic |
| Home state | New York | Missouri |
| Running mate | Earl Warren | Alben W. Barkley |
| Electoral vote | 4 | 0 |
| Popular vote | 121,299 | 107,995 |
| Percentage | 52.41% | 46.66% |

Dewey
40–50%
50–60%
60–70%
70–80%
80–90%
90–100%
Truman
40–50%
50–60%
60–70%
70–80%
80–90%
President before election
Harry S. Truman
Democratic
Elected President
Harry S. Truman
Democratic

The 1948 United States presidential election in New Hampshire took place on November 2, 1948, as part of the 1948 United States presidential election, held throughout all contemporary 48 states. Voters chose four representatives, or electors to the Electoral College, who voted for president and vice president.

New Hampshire was won by the Republican nominees, former Governor Thomas E. Dewey of New York and his running mate Governor Earl Warren of California. Dewey and Warren defeated the Democratic nominees, incumbent President Harry S. Truman of Missouri and his running mate Senator Alben W. Barkley of Kentucky. Also in the running was the Progressive Party candidate, former Democratic Vice President Henry A. Wallace, who ran with former Senator Glen H. Taylor of Idaho.

Dewey took 52.41% of the vote to Truman's 46.66%, a margin of 5.75%. Wallace came in a distant third, with 0.85%.

Dewey won seven counties to Truman's three; however, the race was kept close statewide by Truman's victories in the state's more populous counties.

Since Franklin D. Roosevelt won them in 1932, the counties of Hillsborough County, Strafford County, and Coos County had become reliable New Deal Democratic base counties, voting for Roosevelt all four times. Truman's most significant victory was winning a majority in populous Hillsborough County, home to Manchester and Nashua, which had been a reliable Democratic bastion since voting for Democrat Al Smith in 1928.

Carroll County had long been the most Republican county in New Hampshire, voting 60% against FDR all four times, and would vote over 70% for Thomas E. Dewey.

As Truman narrowly won an upset victory over Dewey nationally, New Hampshire's result would make the state about ten percentage points more Republican than the national average. Dewey's 52.41% of the popular vote made New Hampshire his fifth strongest state after Vermont, Maine, Nebraska and Kansas.

== Results ==
1948 United States presidential election in New Hampshire
| Party | Candidate | Votes | Percentage | Electoral votes |
|---|---|---|---|---|
| Republican | Thomas E. Dewey | 121,299 | 52.41% | 4 |
| Democratic | Harry S. Truman (incumbent) | 107,995 | 46.66% | 0 |
| Progressive | Henry A. Wallace | 1,970 | 0.85% | 0 |
| Socialist | Norman Thomas | 86 | 0.04% | 0 |
| Socialist Labor | Edward A. Teichert | 83 | 0.04% | 0 |
| Dixiecrat (write-in) | Strom Thurmond (write-in) | 7 | 0.00% | 0 |
| Totals | | 231,440 | 100.00% | 4 |

=== Results by county ===
| County | Thomas E. Dewey Republican | | Harry S. Truman Democratic | | Henry A. Wallace Progressive | | Various candidates Other parties | | Margin | | Total votes cast |
| County | # | % | # | % | # | % | # | % | # | % | # |
|---|---|---|---|---|---|---|---|---|---|---|---|
| Belknap | 7,152 | 64.79% | 3,822 | 34.62% | 53 | 0.48% | 12 | 0.11% | 3,330 | 30.17% | 11,039 |
| Carroll | 6,127 | 76.11% | 1,869 | 23.22% | 48 | 0.60% | 6 | 0.07% | 4,258 | 52.89% | 8,050 |
| Cheshire | 9,043 | 58.32% | 6,337 | 40.87% | 116 | 0.75% | 10 | 0.06% | 2,706 | 17.45% | 15,506 |
| Coös | 7,005 | 46.19% | 7,930 | 52.29% | 221 | 1.46% | 9 | 0.06% | -925 | -6.10% | 15,165 |
| Grafton | 12,248 | 63.52% | 6,841 | 35.48% | 154 | 0.80% | 38 | 0.20% | 5,407 | 28.04% | 19,281 |
| Hillsborough | 28,257 | 39.95% | 41,789 | 59.07% | 647 | 0.91% | 46 | 0.07% | -13,532 | -19.12% | 70,739 |
| Merrimack | 16,586 | 59.37% | 11,171 | 39.99% | 161 | 0.58% | 17 | 0.06% | 5,415 | 19.38% | 27,935 |
| Rockingham | 18,890 | 60.68% | 11,937 | 38.35% | 292 | 0.94% | 9 | 0.03% | 6,953 | 22.33% | 31,128 |
| Strafford | 9,988 | 45.87% | 11,603 | 53.29% | 179 | 0.82% | 3 | 0.01% | -1,615 | -7.42% | 21,773 |
| Sullivan | 6,003 | 55.50% | 4,696 | 43.41% | 99 | 0.92% | 19 | 0.18% | 1,307 | 12.09% | 10,817 |
| Totals | 121,299 | 52.41% | 107,995 | 46.66% | 1,970 | 0.85% | 176 | 0.08% | 13,304 | 5.75% | 231,440 |

==== Counties that flipped from Democratic to Republican ====
- Sullivan

== See also ==
- Presidency of Harry S. Truman
- United States presidential elections in New Hampshire
