= 1924 United States presidential election in New Hampshire =

- November 4, 1924

Nominee	Calvin Coolidge	John W. Davis	Robert M. La Follette
Party	Republican	Democratic	Progressive
Home state	Massachusetts	West Virginia	Wisconsin
Running mate	Charles G. Dawes	Charles W. Bryan	Burton K. Wheeler
Electoral vote	4	0	0
Popular vote	98,575	57,201	8,993
Percentage	59.83%	34.72%	5.46%

Coolidge
40–50%
50–60%
60–70%
70–80%
80–90%
90–100%
Davis
40–50%
50–60%
60–70%
70–80%
President before election
Calvin Coolidge
Republican
Elected President
Calvin Coolidge
Republican

The 1924 United States presidential election in New Hampshire took place on November 4, 1924, as part of the 1924 United States presidential election which was held throughout all contemporary 48 states. Voters chose four representatives, or electors to the Electoral College, who voted for president and vice president.

New Hampshire voted for the Republican nominee, incumbent President Calvin Coolidge of Massachusetts, over the Democratic nominee, Ambassador John W. Davis of West Virginia. Coolidge ran with former Budget Director Charles G. Dawes of Illinois, while Davis ran with Governor Charles W. Bryan of Nebraska. Also in the running that year was the Progressive Party nominee, Senator Robert M. La Follette of Wisconsin and his running mate Senator Burton K. Wheeler of Montana. La Follette's support base was primarily among rural German and Scandinavian Americans, and he possessed little appeal in the Northeast outside a few New York and Boston anti-Prohibition precincts. Excluding the former Confederacy where the lower classes were almost entirely disfranchised, New Hampshire would prove La Follette's third-weakest state – and overall, New Hampshire was La Follette's tenth-weakest of 48.

Coolidge won New Hampshire by a margin of 25.11% of the vote, although this was marginally lower than his national margin of 25.22% over Davis.

The 1920s were a fiercely Republican decade in American politics, and New Hampshire in that era was a fiercely Republican state in presidential elections. The economic boom and social good feelings of the Roaring Twenties under popular Republican leadership virtually guaranteed Calvin Coolidge an easy win in the state against the conservative Southern Democrat John Davis, who had little appeal in Northern states like New Hampshire apart from being the only pro-League of Nations candidate. New Hampshire would still prove Davis’ third-strongest antebellum free state behind Indiana and Rhode Island. Due to La Follette's lack of appeal vis-à-vis his Midwest and Western support base, both Coolidge and Davis exceeded their national vote share by around five percent in New Hampshire.

Coolidge also enjoyed a unique personal popularity which helped him in the state and the rest of New England. He was the epitome of a traditional New England Yankee, having been born in the small-town of Plymouth Notch in neighboring Vermont, and establishing his political career in neighboring Massachusetts as the state's governor. Thus Coolidge remained especially popular with voters across the New England region.

== Results ==
1924 United States presidential election in New Hampshire
Party	Candidate	Running mate	Popular vote		Electoral vote	
Party	Candidate	Running mate	Count	%	Count	%
Republican	Calvin Coolidge of Massachusetts	Charles Gates Dawes of Illinois	98,575	59.83%	4	100.00%
Democratic	John William Davis of West Virginia	Charles Wayland Bryan of Nebraska	57,201	34.72%	0	0.00%
Progressive	Robert Marion La Follette of Wisconsin	Burton Kendall Wheeler of Montana	8,993	5.46%	0	0.00%
Total			164,769	100.00%	4	100.00%

=== Results by county ===
County	John Calvin Coolidge Republican		John William Davis Democratic		Robert M. La Follette Sr. Progressive		Margin		Total votes cast
County	#	%	#	%	#	%	#	%	Total votes cast
Belknap	5,996	63.79%	3,217	34.23%	186	1.98%	2,779	29.57%	9,399
Carroll	4,372	65.40%	2,213	33.10%	100	1.50%	2,159	32.30%	6,685
Cheshire	7,008	69.00%	2,720	26.78%	428	4.21%	4,288	42.22%	10,156
Coös	6,137	52.67%	4,620	39.65%	894	7.67%	1,517	13.02%	11,651
Grafton	10,493	64.12%	5,360	32.75%	511	3.12%	5,133	31.37%	16,364
Hillsborough	22,098	51.66%	16,002	37.41%	4,673	10.93%	6,096	14.25%	42,773
Merrimack	13,587	59.88%	8,283	36.50%	822	3.62%	5,304	23.37%	22,692
Rockingham	14,530	68.42%	6,073	28.60%	634	2.99%	8,457	39.82%	21,237
Strafford	9,167	56.63%	6,445	39.82%	575	3.55%	2,722	16.82%	16,187
Sullivan	5,187	68.03%	2,268	29.74%	170	2.23%	2,919	38.28%	7,625
Totals	98,575	59.83%	57,201	34.72%	8,993	5.46%	41,374	25.11%	164,769

== See also ==
- United States presidential elections in New Hampshire
