= 1928 United States presidential election in New Hampshire =

- November 6, 1928

Nominee	Herbert Hoover	Al Smith
Party	Republican	Democratic
Home state	California	New York
Running mate	Charles Curtis	Joseph T. Robinson
Electoral vote	4	0
Popular vote	115,404	80,715
Percentage	58.65%	41.02%

Hoover
50–60%
60–70%
70–80%
80–90%
90–100%
Smith
40–50%
50–60%
60–70%
70–80%
Tie
50%
President before election
Calvin Coolidge
Republican
Elected President
Herbert Hoover
Republican

The 1928 United States presidential election in New Hampshire took place on November 6, 1928, as part of the 1928 United States presidential election which was held throughout all contemporary 48 states. Voters chose four representatives, or electors, to the Electoral College, who voted for president and vice president.

New Hampshire voted for the Republican nominee, former Secretary of Commerce Herbert Hoover of California, over the Democratic nominee, Governor Alfred E. Smith of New York. Hoover's running mate was Senate Majority Leader Charles Curtis of Kansas, while Smith ran with Senator Joseph Taylor Robinson of Arkansas.

Hoover won New Hampshire by a margin of 17.63%, almost exactly the same as his national figure, though a decline upon Calvin Coolidge’s 1924 margin. He also became the first ever Republican to win the White House without carrying Hillsborough County.

== Results ==
1928 United States presidential election in New Hampshire
Party	Candidate	Running mate	Popular vote		Electoral vote	
Party	Candidate	Running mate	Count	%	Count	%
Republican	Herbert Hoover of California	Charles Curtis of Kansas	115,404	58.65%	4	100.00%
Democratic	Al Smith of New York	Joseph Taylor Robinson of Arkansas	80,715	41.02%	0	0.00%
Socialist	Norman Thomas of New York	James Hudson Maurer of Pennsylvania	465	0.24%	0	0.00%
Communist	William Z. Foster of Massachusetts	Benjamin Gitlow of New York	173	0.09%	0	0.00%
Total			196,757	100.00%	4	100.00%

=== Results by county ===
County	Herbert Clark Hoover Republican		Alfred Emmanuel Smith Democratic		Norman Mattoon Thomas Socialist		William Z. Foster Workers		Margin		Total votes cast
County	#	%	#	%	#	%	#	%	#	%	Total votes cast
Belknap	6,762	64.63%	3,689	35.26%	9	0.09%	2	0.02%	3,073	29.37%	10,462
Carroll	5,509	77.41%	1,592	22.37%	9	0.13%	7	0.10%	3,917	55.04%	7,117
Cheshire	8,673	63.05%	5,025	36.53%	41	0.30%	17	0.12%	3,648	26.52%	13,756
Coös	7,891	56.64%	6,006	43.11%	26	0.19%	8	0.06%	1,885	13.53%	13,931
Grafton	12,566	66.99%	6,035	32.17%	141	0.75%	17	0.09%	6,531	34.82%	18,759
Hillsborough	24,465	45.24%	29,457	54.47%	105	0.19%	60	0.11%	-4,992	-9.23%	54,078
Merrimack	15,724	60.63%	10,139	39.09%	45	0.17%	27	0.10%	5,585	21.53%	25,935
Rockingham	17,590	69.18%	7,782	30.61%	41	0.16%	12	0.05%	9,808	38.58%	25,425
Strafford	10,470	58.36%	7,441	41.48%	22	0.12%	6	0.03%	3,029	16.88%	17,939
Sullivan	5,754	61.57%	3,549	37.97%	26	0.28%	17	0.18%	2,205	23.59%	9,346
Totals	115,404	58.66%	80,715	41.02%	465	0.24%	173	0.09%	34,689	17.63%	196,748

== See also ==
- United States presidential elections in New Hampshire
