= Patrick Caddell =

American public opinion pollster (1950–2019)

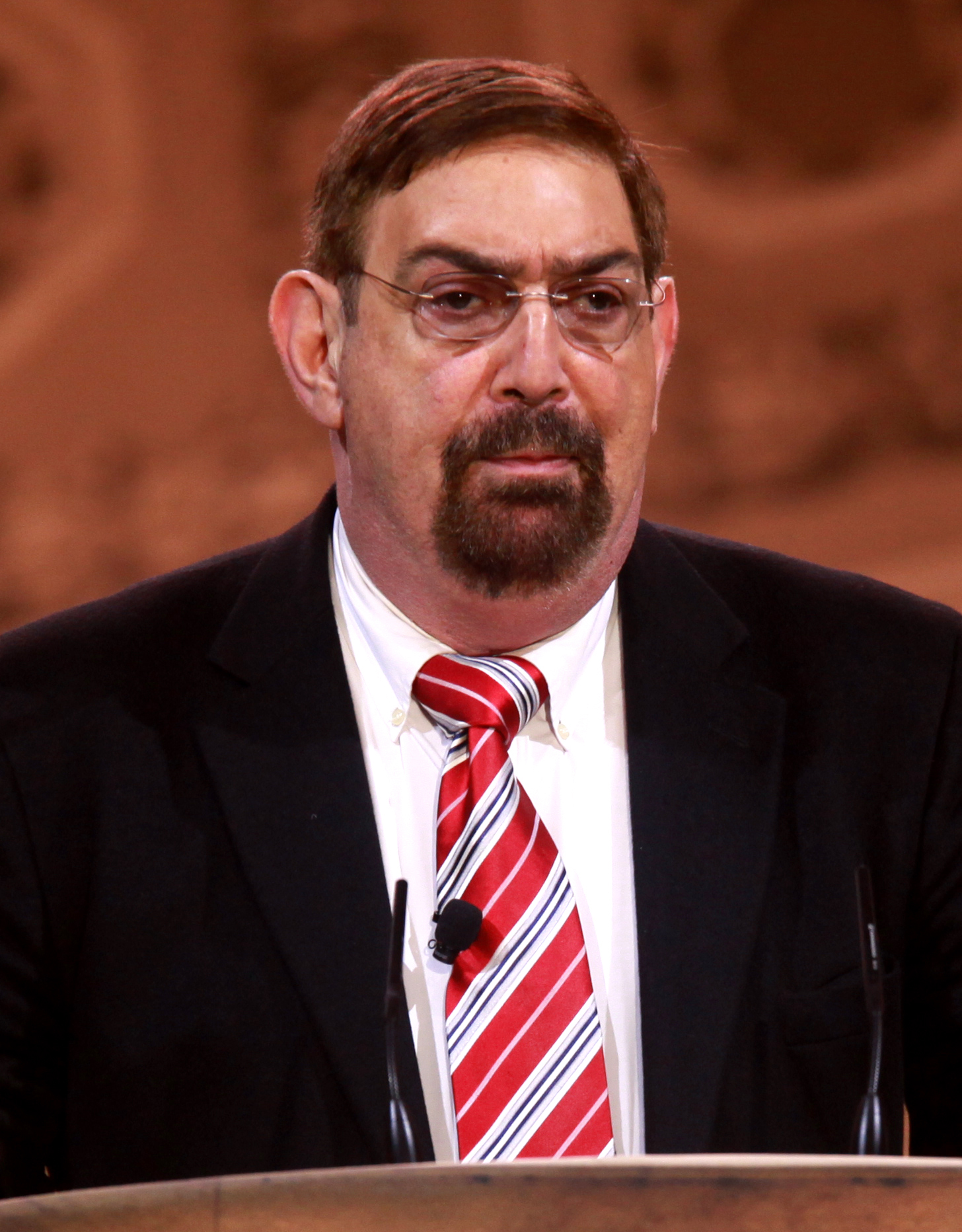
- Caddell at the 2014 CPAC
- Born: Patrick Hayward Caddell; May 19, 1950; Rock Hill, South Carolina, U.S.
- Died: February 16, 2019 (aged 68); Charleston, South Carolina, U.S.
- Education: Harvard University
- Occupations: pollster, political firm consultant

Patrick Hayward Caddell (May 19, 1950 – February 16, 2019) was an American public opinion pollster and a political film consultant who served in the Carter administration. He worked for Democratic presidential candidates George McGovern in 1972, Jimmy Carter in 1976 and 1980, Gary Hart in 1984 (primary), Walter Mondale in 1984 (general election), Joe Biden in 1988, and Jerry Brown in 1992. He also worked for Mario Cuomo, Bob Graham, Michael Dukakis, Paul Simon, Ted Kennedy, Harold Washington, Andrew Romanoff and Donald Trump.

== Early life ==
Patrick Hayward Caddell was born into an Irish Catholic family in Rock Hill, South Carolina, the son of Newton Pascal Caddell (1923–1989), a U.S. Coast Guard officer, and Janie Burns Caddell (1922–1997). He spent most of his childhood in various base towns, such as Falmouth, Massachusetts, and was inspired by the Kennedys.

While attending Bishop Kenny High School in Jacksonville, Florida (where he was president of the student body and member of the National Honor Society), he developed a model to project election winners and was hired by Speaker of the Florida House of Representatives, Frederick H. Schultz. In his senior year at Harvard, he borrowed $25,000 from Schultz and started a polling firm, Cambridge Survey Research, with two classmates, John Gorman (1950–2008) and Daniel Porter (1950–1973). In the fall of 1971, Gary Hart, the campaign manager for George McGovern's 1972 presidential campaign, hired Caddell's firm to conduct polls in New Hampshire, where he worked closely with McGovern's aide Frank Mankiewicz, and Caddell began pitching his "alienated voters" theory. After Harvard informed him that he would not graduate without passing a swimming test, Caddell hastily arranged a swimming test in a California hotel pool. Gonzo journalist Hunter S. Thompson was his coach and renowned political journalist Theodore H. White, who was a member of the Harvard Board of Overseers, served as the judge. Caddell graduated from Harvard University in 1972.

In July 1973, Daniel Porter and his girlfriend Susan Petz were murdered on a camping trip at Adirondack Park by serial killer Robert Garrow. After police discovered Porter's car, Caddell came to Adirondack Park to join the search and he was the one who discovered Porter's body in the woods. Due to the fact that, as business partners, Caddell and Porter had taken life insurance policies on each other, Caddell was initially considered a suspect. During the Watergate hearings, it was revealed that both Caddell and Porter were on President Richard Nixon's enemies list. They were the youngest people on the list. Consequently, Senator Ted Kennedy became concerned Caddell was being falsely accused for political reasons and sent two of his own investigators to Warren County, New York. After Garrow committed another murder on July 29, 1973, it became obvious to police that he was the perpetrator of the Porter-Petz murders and Caddell was cleared.

== Career ==
=== Jimmy Carter 1976 presidential campaign and "malaise" speech ===
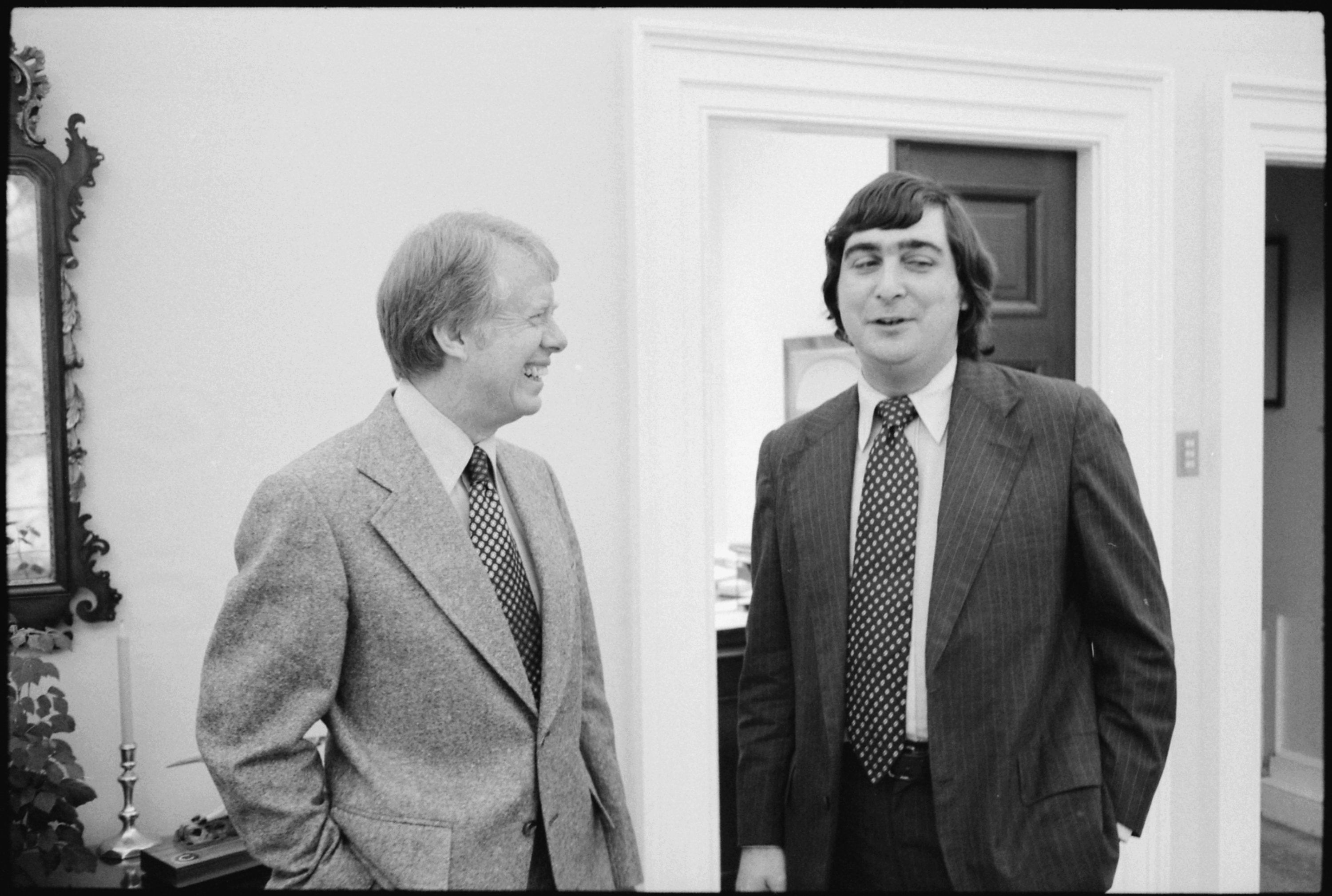
Caddell with Jimmy Carter in November 1977

Caddell persuaded Carter to focus in 1976 on the "trust factor", rather than divisive political issues in the 1976 campaign, a strategy which led, narrowly, to victory. The Arkansas political scientist and pollster Jim Ranchino declared the then 26-year-old Caddell "the best pollster in the business". After Carter was elected president, Caddell purchased a gold Mercedes. He and White House Communications Director Gerald Rafshoon rented a Georgetown house (known as "R Street Beach") from Miss America 1951, Yolande Fox. He escorted actress Lauren Bacall to Carter's inauguration ball. Actor Warren Beatty introduced him to Christie Hefner, the daughter of Playboy magazine founder Hugh Hefner. Dotty Lynch worked for him from 1973 to 1979.

According to researchers, Caddell had wide influence and access in the Carter White House, and enjoyed close relationships with both President Carter and the first lady, Rosalynn Carter. He was the chief advocate of what later became known as Carter's "malaise speech". The speech was initially well received, but Carter soon fired most of his cabinet and his popularity suffered. In 1987, Carter's White House press secretary, Jody Powell, stated that the cabinet firings were not Caddell's idea, but that of Carter's White House chief of staff, Hamilton Jordan.

Although Caddell was not on the government's payroll, he carried a White House pass and regularly attended strategy meetings led by Jordan. Caddell's memos to Carter were not screened by anyone on the White House staff. In 1977, Caddell's privileged access to the Oval Office, despite his corporate and foreign clients, led to charges of conflict of interest. The New York Times columnist William Safire specifically criticized Caddell's contract with Saudi Arabia. Caddell's desire to officially join Carter's White House staff was allegedly vetoed by Jordan.

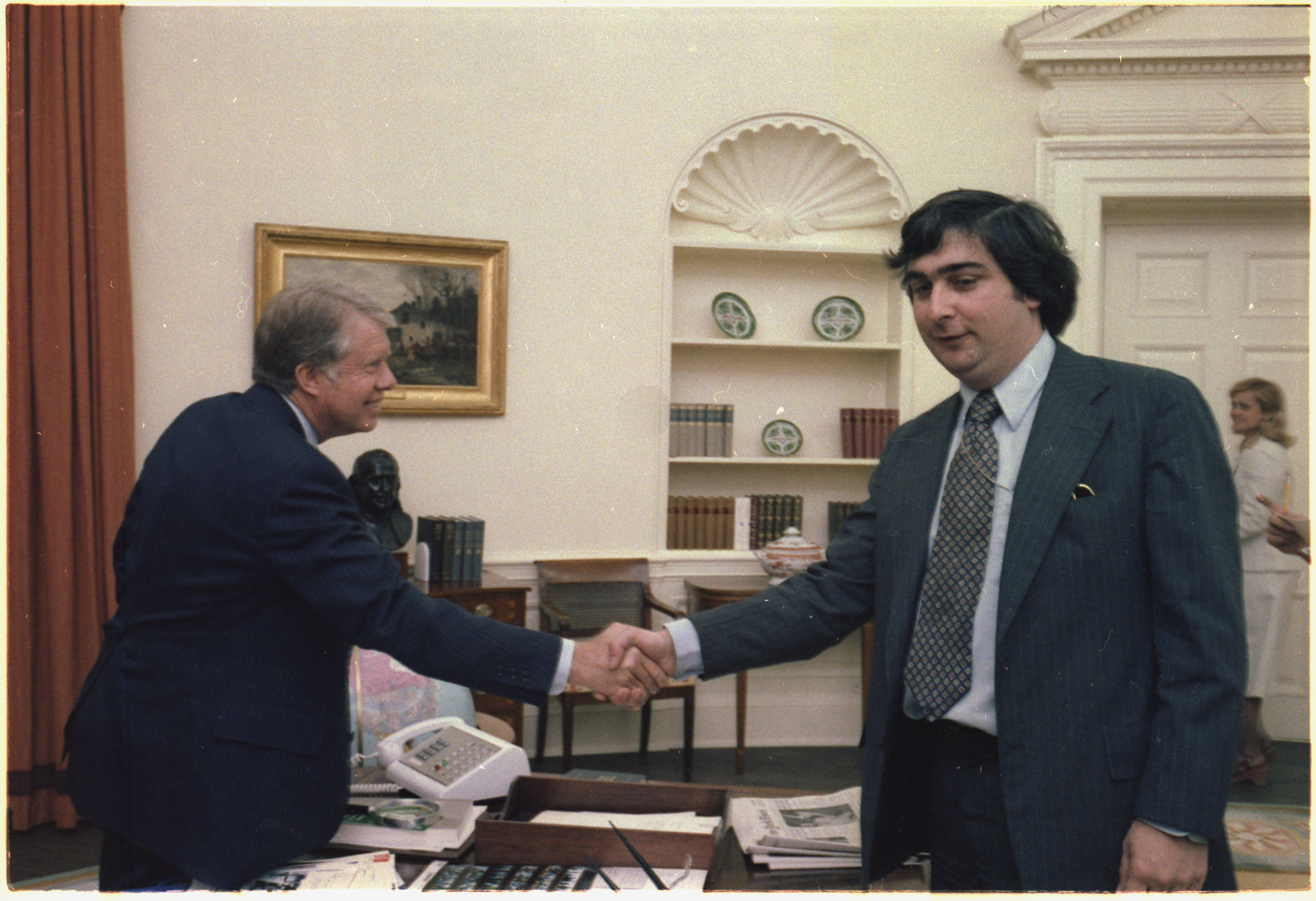
Caddell in the Oval Office shaking hands with President Jimmy Carter

=== 1984 presidential election ===
After Carter's defeat in the 1980 presidential election, Caddell began to look for a candidate to run against Ronald Reagan in 1984. Senator John Glenn rejected him. Carter's Vice President Walter Mondale, who had disagreed with Caddell over the "malaise speech," instead hired Bob Beckel as campaign manager and Peter Hart as pollster. He tried to persuade Joe Biden, Dale Bumpers, and then Chris Dodd to run, but none of them were interested. On New Year's Eve 1983, Caddell was hired by his longtime friend Senator Gary Hart, who had given Caddell his first job in national politics on the George McGovern campaign in 1972. Caddell was credited with Hart's stunning victory over Mondale in the 1984 New Hampshire primary. However, he was blamed for approving a television commercial attacking influential Chicago alderman Edward "Fast Eddie" Vrdolyak that inflicted significant damage to Hart's campaign. He was also accused of refusing to attend campaign meetings and only willing to deal with Hart directly.

After Mondale defeated Hart in the 1984 Democratic presidential primaries, Caddell joined Mondale's campaign. He was tasked with polling, strategy, and debate prep. He was credited with devising Mondale's debate strategy in the first 1984 United States presidential debates.

=== Joe Biden 1988 presidential campaign ===
Caddell and Biden initially became close friends in 1972 during Biden's first campaign for US Senate, when the 21-year-old Caddell was the pollster for the 29-year-old Biden. In 1983, Biden remarked, "Sometimes it's hard to know where Pat's thinking stops and mine begins." Biden also remarked to journalist Jules Witcover that Caddell was a "godlike" figure. Caddell and Biden sometimes spent summers together at Caddell's rented house on Martha's Vineyard listening to recordings of Bobby Kennedy's speeches and, on one occasion, Caddell accompanied the Biden family on a winter vacation to Hawaii.

After Mondale's defeat in the 1984 election, Caddell started a political and corporate consulting firm with Bob Shrum and David Doak. A public dispute between the three men ensued and Biden was called in to be the mediator. In 1988, Caddell left Democratic consulting firm Caddell, Doak and Shrum after what The Washington Post described as an "acrimonious lawsuit". When Biden decided to run for president in 1988, he initially approached Doak to be his campaign manager, but Doak rejected him because he didn't want to work with Caddell again. Instead, Doak and Shrum signed onto Dick Gephardt's campaign. Biden eventually hired Tim Ridley (1955–2005) to be his campaign manager. Biden's campaign was plagued by infighting, largely attributed to Caddell's presence. Shortly after Biden announced his presidential run in June 1987, Caddell accosted a Washington Post reporter at a hotel in Des Moines, Iowa, and consequently, Biden's aide Ted Kaufman asked him not to attend the first primary debate. In August 1987, after a series of one-on-one meetings and dinners with Caddell throughout the summer (ostensibly to prepare for the Robert Bork Supreme Court nomination hearings), Biden confided in his senior staff, Ridley, Tom Donilon, Kaufman, and sister Valerie Biden Owens that he was reluctant to fire Caddell due to their longstanding friendship and simply did not know what to do.

On September 12, 1987, Biden was accused of plagiarizing a speech from British Labour Party leader Neil Kinnock. Four days later, Biden was further accused of plagiarizing another speech, stealing phrases verbatim from Bobby Kennedy. The latter speech was written by Caddell. Biden was later found to have also plagiarized speeches from John F. Kennedy and Hubert Humphrey. Biden's staff urged him to withdraw from the race, but Caddell argued otherwise and instead urged Biden to attack the press. He confronted the New York Times reporter who had initially written the Kinnock story over the phone and falsely accused his former business partners Shrum and Doak of producing the "attack video" highlighting Biden's plagiarism. On October 1, 1987, Michael Dukakis acknowledged that his campaign manager, John Sasso, was the one who had given the New York Times reporter the Biden plagiarism videotape. Sasso and Dukakis' political director, Paul Tully (1944–1992), subsequently resigned. Caddell later apologized to the Gephardt campaign.

On September 22, 1987, the night before Biden withdrew from the presidential race, Biden's inner circle gathered at Biden's home in Wilmington, Delaware, and advised him to drop out. Caddell was not invited to the meeting, but he called every 15 minutes to argue otherwise through a pay phone. He told Biden's press spokesman, Larry Rasky (1951–2020), "You people have formed a vigilante group to get my candidate out of the race." He told another advisor that he had "no right to give my candidate advice". He demanded Biden's brother, Jimmy, to allow him to speak to Biden directly and accused Jimmy of screening calls.

One week after Biden withdrew, he met with Caddell in Wilmington and told him that "his advice would no longer be welcomed in any future political endeavor". Additionally, Biden released a statement that stated, "The senator wants it to be known that he has no animosity toward Pat Caddell, but that he has ended his relationship with him." Initially, Caddell claimed that their friendship was still intact and that Biden's statement only meant they would no longer have a professional relationship, but in a 2017 interview almost 30 years later, Caddell conceded that their relationship never recovered and that he was "not comfortable yet to talk about it". When asked about Caddell in 2007, Biden said, "I hope he's doing okay. I don't know anybody who sees him. I ask all the time, 'Anybody seen Pat?" In a subsequent interview in 2015, Biden said, "For 20 years, I haven't seen Pat. We don't have a relationship. He's a good guy."

Caddell was also accused of having a role in the implosion of his former boss' Gary Hart's 1988 presidential campaign after a photo of Hart with model Donna Rice on the yacht Monkey Business surfaced in May 1987, leading to charges of infidelity and Hart's withdrawal from the race. Caddell denied the allegation. Others accused Republican strategist Lee Atwater of "setting up" Hart.

=== Subsequent activities ===
In 1988, Caddell relocated to California to teach a course at the University of California, Santa Barbara. His longtime friend, Warren Beatty, encouraged him to get involved in the movie industry, and they collaborated on the 1998 satirical film Bulworth. Caddell served as a consultant on various scripted productions, most notably the feature films Apocalypse Now, Air Force One, Outbreak, and In the Line of Fire; the made-for-television movies Running Mates and Y2K; and the television series The West Wing. He was also a marketing consultant on Coca-Cola's ill-fated New Coke campaign in 1985.

In the 1992 presidential election, Caddell advised Jerry Brown in the Democratic primaries and then independent candidate Ross Perot in the general election. He was subsequently shunned in Democratic circles due to Bill Clinton's victory in 1992, which precipitated his rightward lurch. Caddell's analysis on polls and campaign issues increasingly put him at odds with the leadership of the Democratic Party. He was criticized by Media Matters for America and Salon columnist Steve Kornacki for predicting negative consequences for the Democratic Party. He called environmentalism "a conspiracy 'to basically deconstruct capitalism.'" In 2000, he donated $1,000 to Green Party presidential candidate Ralph Nader's presidential campaign. In 2002, he was hired by Republican former Los Angeles mayor Richard Riordan, who was a primary candidate in the 2002 California gubernatorial election.

Caddell played an informal role in Howard Dean's 2004 presidential campaign. In 2003, in a phone conversation with Dean's campaign manager Joe Trippi (who had worked under him at the consulting firm Caddell, Doak and Shrum in the mid-1980s), Caddell came up with Dean's "you have the power" refrain. He attacked John Kerry's 2004 presidential campaign, which was led by his estranged former business partner Bob Shrum, as "political crypto-gangsters who have taken over the heart and soul of the Democratic Party in Washington," and that "their job is hold on to power and hold on to money.”

In January 2010, Trippi, Celinda Lake, and Caddell were named as consultants to Andrew Romanoff’s Senate campaign in Colorado. Caddell claimed he was "coming out of consulting retirement to work for Romanoff as he takes a principled stand for people against the entrenched interests and cesspool of Washington.”

In November 2010, Caddell penned an op-ed in The Washington Post calling on Barack Obama not to seek re-election.

In the run-up to the 2012 presidential election, Caddell was involved in the founding of a conservative non-profit group called "Secure America Now," which ran ads featuring Prime Minister of Israel Benjamin Netanyahu to target Jewish-American voters.

In the 2000s, Republicans began citing Caddell's tirades against the Democratic Party when they spoke on the floor of the House and the Senate. Caddell was a regular guest on Fox News, and at the time of his death was listed as an official "Fox News Contributor". This earned him the label of a "Fox News Democrat" by critics such as liberal online opinion magazine Salon. He also frequently appeared on the conservative Web site Ricochet.com, discussing politics.

In the 2010s, he was occasionally a guest lecturer at the College of Charleston and the Citadel.

=== Donald Trump 2016 presidential campaign and "enemy of the American people" ===
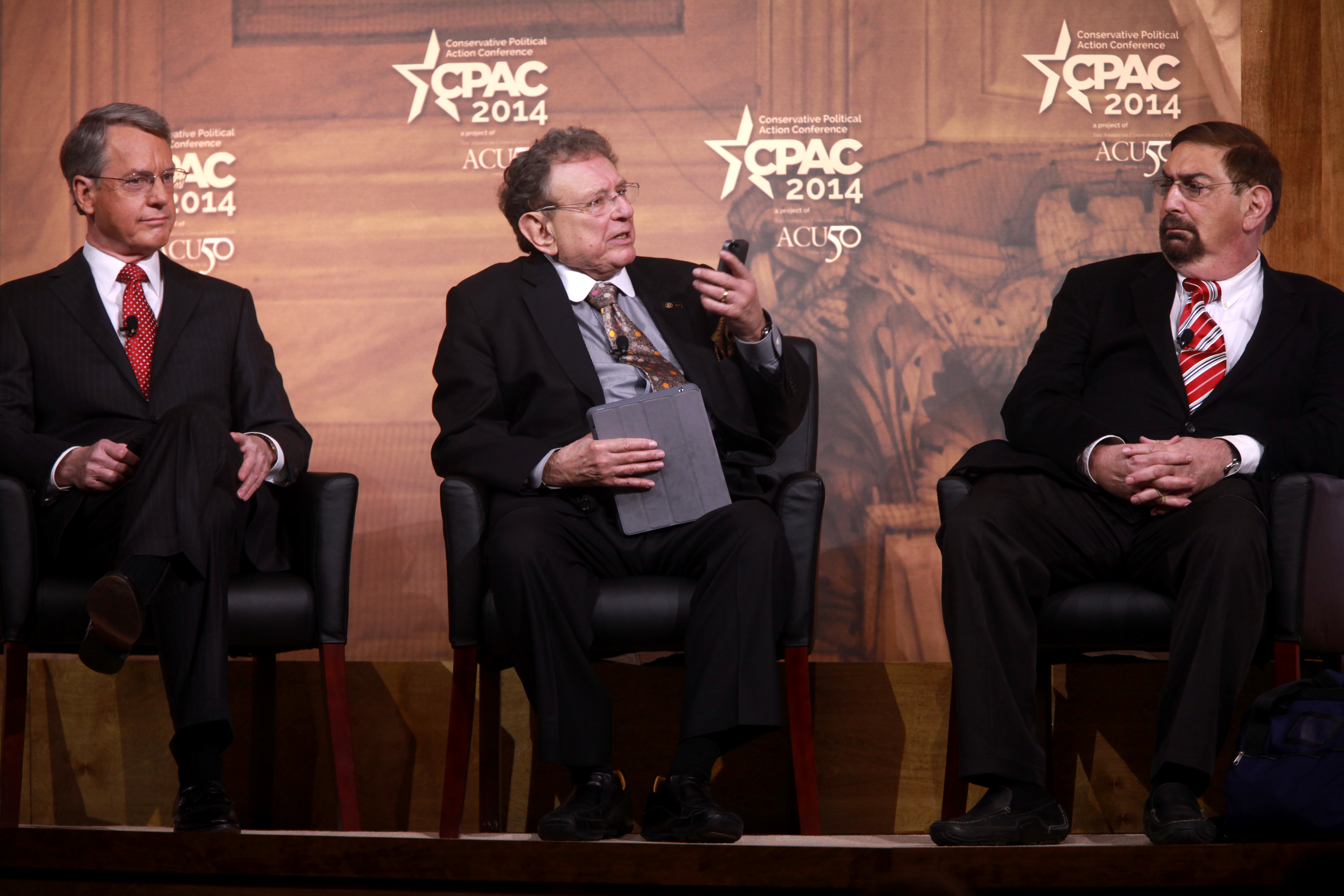
Cadell with Whit Ayres and Ralph Hallow at the 2014 Conservative Political Action Conference

Caddell first met Donald Trump in the 1980s and, despite being a registered Democrat who voted for Bernie Sanders in the 2016 South Carolina primary, served as Trump's informal advisor throughout the 2016 election. In 2013, Caddell became a contractor for Republican mega-donor and Renaissance Technologies CEO Robert Mercer and continued to collect polling data for Mercer until Election Day of 2016. As his polling data increasingly shifted away from the establishment, Caddell began promoting his outsider "Candidate Smith project" and tried to persuade Mercer and his other benefactor, oilman William Lee Hanley, to support an independent candidate. Caddell circulated his research and caught the attention of longtime Trump advisor Roger Stone, who forwarded a memo about it to Trump.

Caddell also became a frequent collaborator of Steve Bannon, then the executive chairman of Breitbart, which was also primarily bankrolled by Mercer. Both Caddell and Bannon were Irish Catholics who had grown up in the South, detested both major political parties, and had previous ties in Hollywood. At Bannon's invitation, Caddell began writing regular columns on Breitbart in 2012 and appeared regularly on Bannon's radio show in 2014. According to online magazine Slate, Caddell was involved in identifying people willing to participate in the 2012 anti-Obama documentary The Hope and the Change, produced by Steve Bannon and Citizens United.

After Paul Manafort was forced to resign as Trump's campaign chairman in August 2016, Bannon was named chief executive of the campaign, Kellyanne Conway was named campaign manager, and David Bossie of Citizens United was named deputy campaign manager. All three were previously Mercer operatives. As a result, Caddell's influence grew within the Trump campaign. Trump regularly called Caddell to compliment his TV appearances and solicit advice. Caddell also visited Trump Tower at Trump's invitation. In an August 2016 radio interview with Breitbart editor-in-chief Alex Marlow, Caddell accused Reuters of rigging the polls and predicted a Trump victory.

Caddell continued to advise Trump after Trump was elected president in the 2016 election. He was credited with pioneering attacks on the media as "the enemy of the American people". In 2012, Caddell gave a speech at a conference sponsored by Accuracy in Media, a conservative watchdog organization, in which he called the media "the enemy of the American people". During the investigation into the 2012 Benghazi attack, Caddell once again referred to the media as "a fundamental threat to American democracy and the enemies of the American people". On February 17, 2017, after giving a speech at a Boeing aircraft plant in North Charleston, South Carolina, President Donald Trump convened a meeting with Caddell, Bannon, and Trump's son-in-law, Jared Kushner. On the afternoon of the same day, Trump declared on Twitter that The New York Times, NBC News, ABC, CBS, and CNN were "fake news" and "the enemy of the American People".

== Campaign style ==
According to a 1987 profile in the Washington Monthly:

Caddell believes the key to winning contemporary elections is appealing to 'alienated' voters—that ever-growing group of mostly younger voters who are not easily identified as liberal or conservative and don't trust government, politicians, or the parties. You can't lure these voters with programs and stands on specific issues, so the theory goes. Rather, you must remain as uncommitted as they are. You lure them by attacking that which caused their alienation: the Establishment. Even if he were inclined to help his candidate address the nation's substantive problems and articulate a coherent package of solutions, he'd have trouble.

== Death ==
After suffering a stroke, Caddell died on February 16, 2019, at age 68 at a hospital in Charleston, South Carolina. He had moved to a house down the block from his daughter, Heidi Caddell Echelberger, and her three children, Olivia Emily Echelberger, 13, Patrick Travis Echelberger, 12, and Janie Kate Echelberger, 11, in Hanahan, South Carolina, in the last decade of his life. According to Professor Kendra Stewart at the College of Charleston, Caddell had not been ill prior to his stroke and his death was a shock to those who knew him. Conservative pundit Ann Coulter, pollster Scott Rasmussen, Democratic political operative Joe Trippi, White House Communications Director Bill Shine, political consultant Douglas Schoen, businessman and former independent senate candidate Greg Orman, political analyst James Pinkerton, and commentator John LeBoutillier were among those who attended his funeral.

In a statement, former President Jimmy Carter said,

"Pat Caddell was a brilliant pollster who at a young age provided me with key information and over his career helped to shape the future of professional research. Rosalynn and I are grateful for his counsel in our campaigns and while we were in the White House. We send our prayers to his family and friends."

Counselor to the President Kellyanne Conway expressed her condolences on Twitter, stating that,

"Pat Caddell (Carter) & Richard Wirthlin (Reagan) helped revolutionize the use of polling in presidential campaigns, and guided/encouraged newbie pollsters like me. Pat was in the fight until the end and will be missed."
