= 1988 New Hampshire Democratic presidential primary =

- February 16, 1988
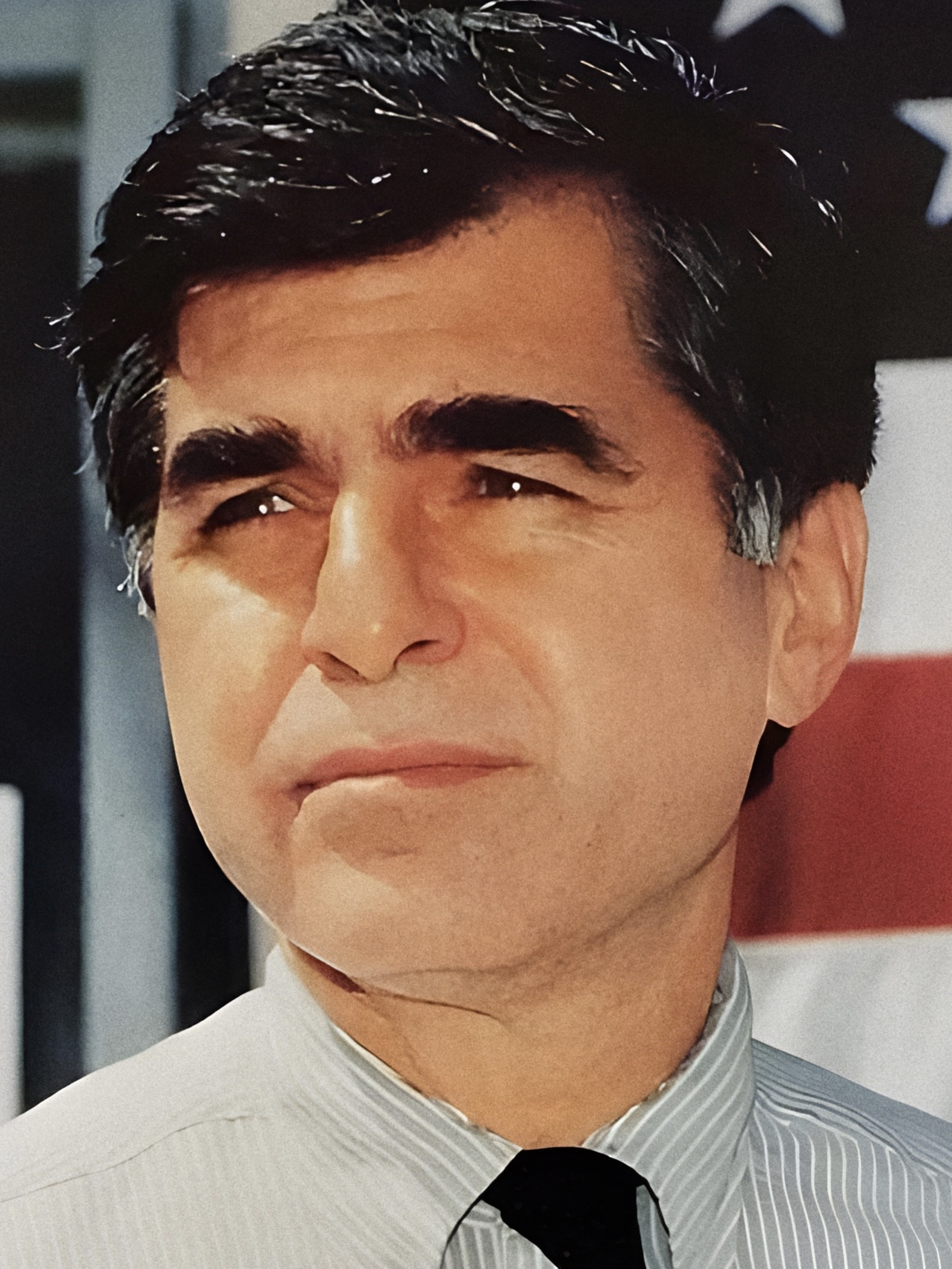

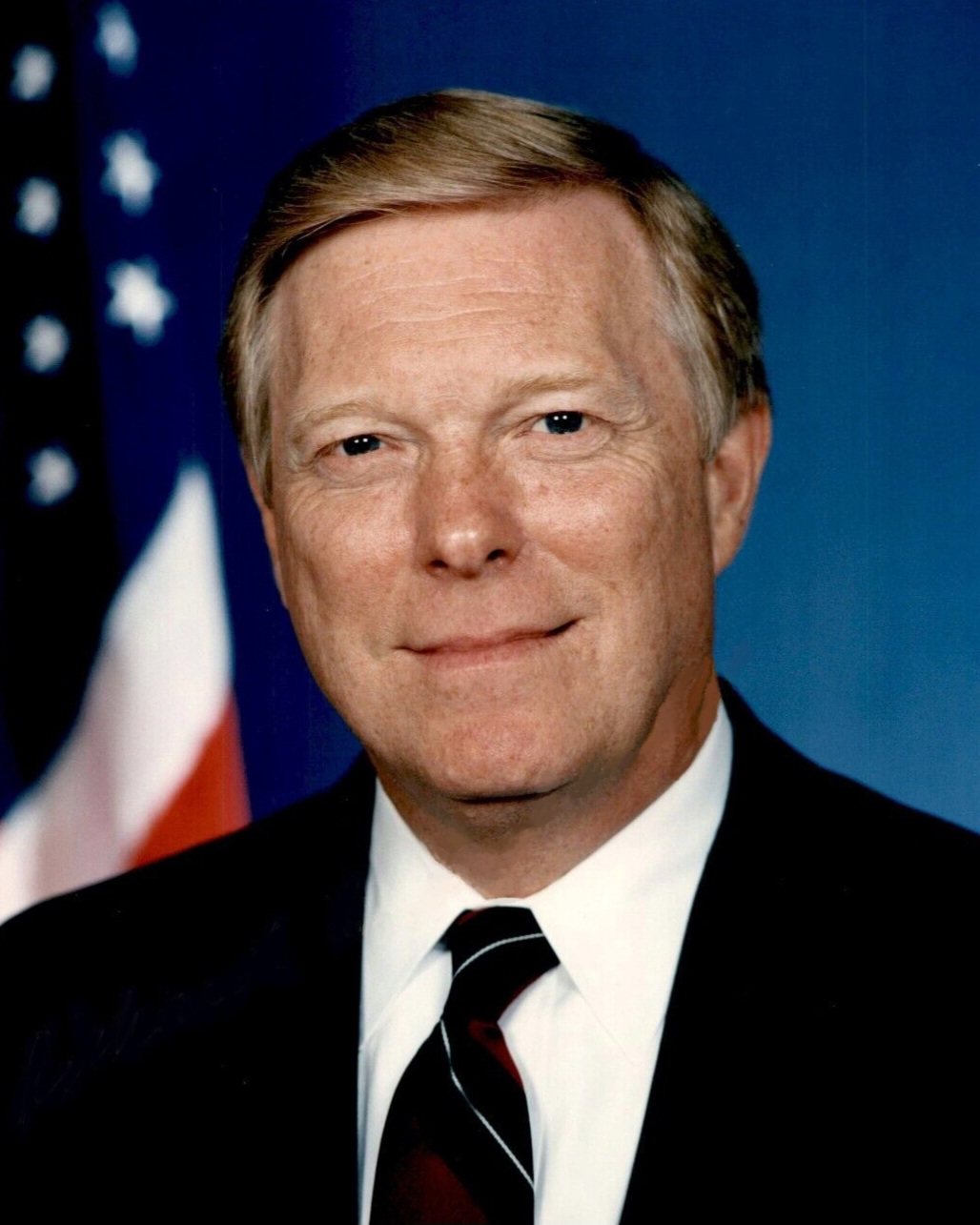

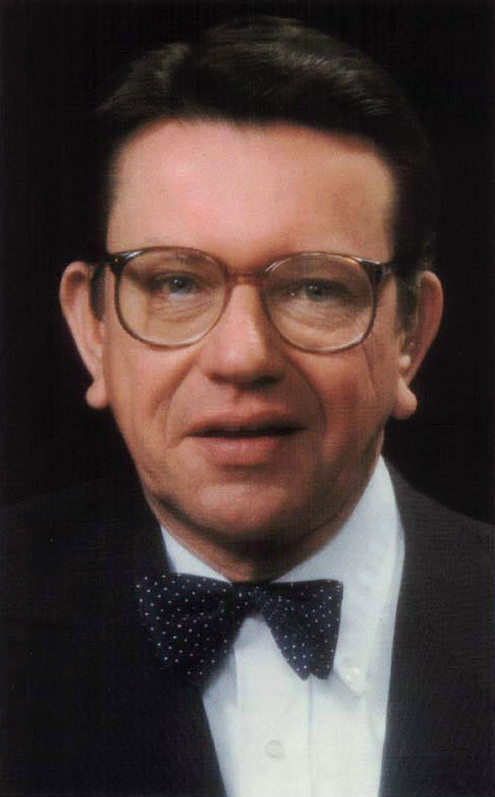

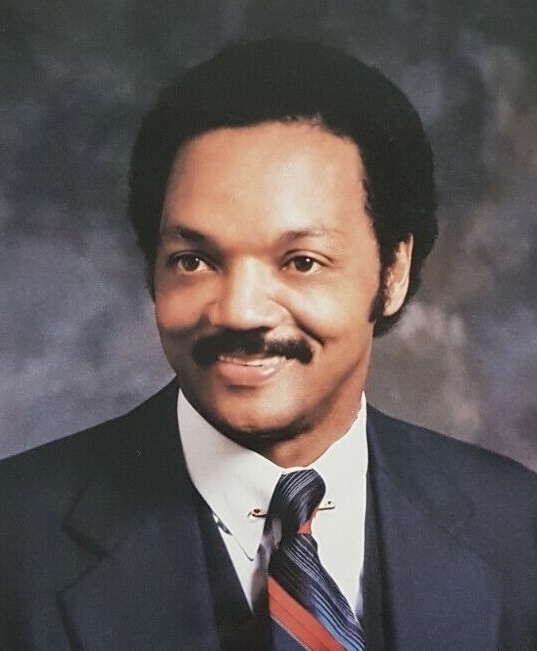

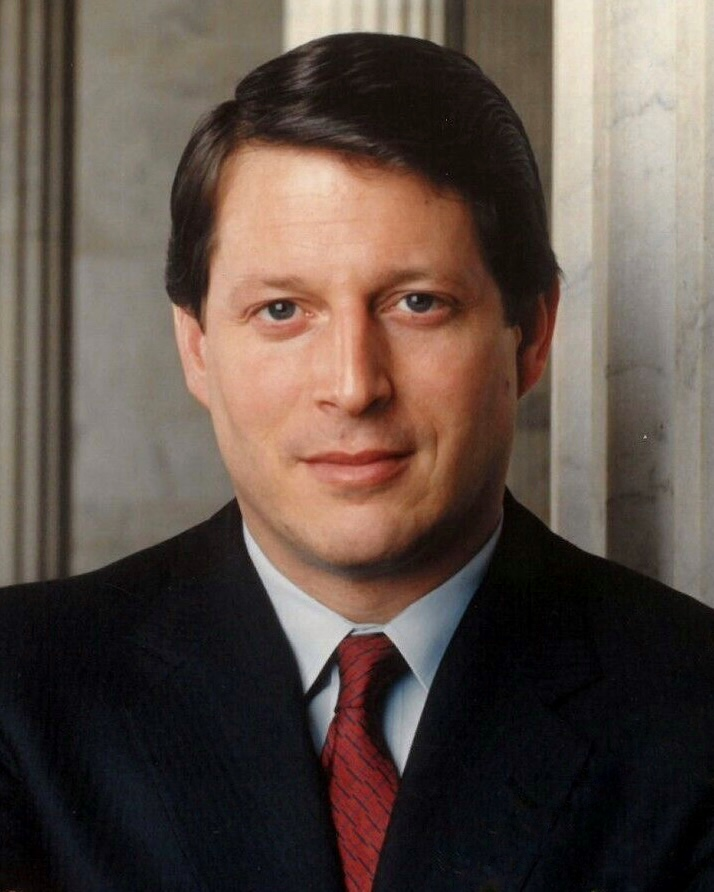
Candidate	Michael Dukakis	Dick Gephardt	Paul Simon
Home state	Massachusetts	Missouri	Illinois
Delegate count	8	4	4
Popular vote	44,112	24,513	21,094
Percentage	35.9%	19.9%	17.2%
Candidate	Jesse Jackson	Al Gore
Home state	South Carolina	Tennessee
Delegate count	0	0
Popular vote	9,615	8,400
Percentage	7.8%	6.8%
- County results Dukakis: 30-40% 40-50%

The 1988 New Hampshire Democratic presidential primary was held on February 16, 1988, in New Hampshire as one of the Democratic Party's statewide nomination contests ahead of the 1988 United States presidential election.

== Details ==
The New Hampshire primary was the second contest in the nation, held directly after the Iowa caucuses. The primary was easily won by neighboring Massachusetts governor and eventual nominee Michael Dukakis, who won all ten counties in the Granite State, and received eight delegates. Dick Gephardt, a representative from Missouri, finished in 2nd place with four delegates. Illinois senator Paul Simon finished in a close 3rd place, also receiving four delegates. No other candidates received delegates.

Dukakis won the crowded New Hampshire primary with just under 36% of the vote, but finished well ahead of his nearest opponent, Dick Gephardt.
