= Enough Is Enough (US organization) =

American nonprofit organization

- Founded: 1992; 34 years ago
- Founders: Dee Jepsen; Sarah Blanken; Monique Nelson
- Location: Reston, Virginia, U.S.
- Method: Public advocacy and congressional lobbying
- Key people: Donna Rice Hughes, President & Chair
- Website: https://www.enough.org

Enough Is Enough is an American anti-pornography non-profit organization. It carries out lobbying efforts in Washington, D.C., and played a role in the passage of the Communications Decency Act of 1996, the Child Online Protection Act of 1998, and the Children's Internet Protection Act of 2000. The group is based in the Commonwealth of Virginia. They sometimes refer to themselves acronymically as EIE.

== Founding and staff ==
Enough Is Enough was founded in 1992 as part of the U.S. anti-pornography movement, but shifted its focus in 1994 to confront online pornography, child pornography, child stalking, and sexual predation.

The organization's co-founder and first president was Dee Jepsen, wife of former U.S. Senator from Iowa Roger Jepsen. Other co-founders were Sarah Blanken and Monique Nelson. Its president and chair since 2002 has been Donna Rice Hughes, who first joined the group in 1994 and was vice president of marketing and public relations. As Donna Rice, she had received considerable attention as the "other woman" in the Gary Hart Monkey Business affair during the previous decade. In her new role as an activist, she neither hid nor promoted her former fame, but the activity helped her overcome her sexually stigmatized past. Future Delaware political candidate Christine O'Donnell worked for the group for a while starting in 1993.

== Activities ==
By 1995, Enough Is Enough was engaging in community-level actions to get across their view of the effects of pornography upon society, such as raiding magazine stands, protesting against adult businesses, and speaking on radio and television talk shows.

The group effectively lobbied the U.S. Congress to include restrictions against online obscenity in the Communications Decency Act of 1996. This included showing U.S. Senators graphic images from the Internet of bondage, bestiality and pedophilia that were available to all users of all ages. Opposition to the bill came strongly from the ACLU. Senator James Exon of Nebraska, co-sponsor of the measure, credited Jepsen and Hughes with helping to find common ground between Christian conservatives and pro-business Republicans on the issue, groups that had been feuding. Hughes emphasized that "We want to do everything we can to protect children against pornography. But we want a bill that will be constitutional and will be effective." The group's connections in Washington helped that coalition succeed in passing the legislation, and Jepsen and Hughes became recognized as influential lobbyists.

The group filed a legal brief in the 1997 U.S. Supreme Court case Reno v. American Civil Liberties Union in favor of upholding that law; the Court instead ruled large parts of it unconstitutional. By 1998, Hughes had become a nationally recognized campaigner against online pornography. Steve Case, CEO of America Online, called her "a key voice in the debate over how we best build this new medium and make it a safe place for families," and she won personal praise from legislative opponents such as U.S. Representative Christopher Cox and compliments from pornography advocate Larry Flynt.

The group lobbied for the Child Online Protection Act of 1998, intended to replace those parts of the previous act deemed unconstitutional. The group and Hughes in particular were major force behind its eventual passage. Jepsen said in that debate, "It is not a First Amendment issue. As our culture has become coarser, children have been robbed of their childhood." This law also ran into problems in the courts. Enough Is Enough was among a number of groups who backed a substitute measure, the Children's Internet Protection Act of 2000, which gained passage and was eventually upheld in the courts.

The group continued to get its message across by displaying to people some of the worst images found on the Internet. The group also put out a twenty-page report entitled "Just Harmless Fun?" that portrayed what it believes are negative effects of pornography from a social science viewpoint. The group also provided parental advice on appropriate websites for children and how to keep them away from the inappropriate ones.

In 2009, Enough Is Enough criticized Microsoft's Bing search engine for displaying preview clips of videos on search results pages, and thus potentially exposing children to sexually themed content without actually clicking on it. During 2010, the group criticized approval of the .xxx domain by ICANN, saying that it would allow pornography providers to co-locate content on both regular and specialty domains; Hughes predicted this would "dramatically increas[e] pornography's pollution of the Internet."

In 2010, Enough Is Enough released The Internet Safety 101 curriculum, consisting of a 4-part DVD teaching series, workbook and resource guide, Rules N’ Tools® booklet and website. It is designed to prevent Internet-initiated crimes against children through educating, equipping and empowering parents, educators and caring adults to protect children from online pornography, sexual predators and cyberbullies, and from dangers related to social networking, online gaming and mobile devices. The curriculum also equips adults to implement both safety rules (non-technical measures) and software tools (technical measures) on all youth's Internet enabled devices. The DVD series was translated into Spanish. The DVD teaching series was reformatted into 3 episodic TV series for PBS which won an Emmy award and an Emmy nomination for Ms. Hughes as the show's host. It is on Amazon and Vimeo.

In the fall of 2014, EIE launched a National Porn Free Wi-Fi campaign with nearly 50,000 petitions and 75 partner organizations encouraging McDonald's and Starbucks to lead corporate America in filtering porn and child porn on public Wi-Fi. As a result, McDonald's is filtering Wi-Fi in nearly 14,000 stores nationwide; Starbucks announced in July 2016 they would begin filtering their public Wi-Fi nationally and are implementing a global safe Wi-Fi policy.

In 2016, with the leadership of Donna Rice Hughes, Enough Is Enough developed "The Children's Internet Safety Presidential Pledge" which asked presidential candidates, if elected, to pledge to defend the innocence and dignity of America's children by enforcing the existing federal laws (obscenity, child pornography, predation, sex trafficking) and advancing public policies designed to 1) prevent the sexual exploitation of children online, and 2) to make the Internet safer for all. The Pledge was sent to each of the presidential candidates. Democratic candidate Hillary Clinton sent a letter of support. In July 2016, then candidate Donald Trump signed the pledge.
