= Gary Hart 1988 presidential campaign =

American political campaign

- Candidate: Gary Hart; U.S Senator from Colorado (1975–1987)
- Affiliation: Democratic Party
- Announced: 1987

Gary Hart, an American Democratic politician representing Colorado in the Senate from 1975 to 1987, ran a campaign for President of the United States in the 1988 presidential election. He had previously run for president in 1984, losing the Democratic nomination to Walter Mondale. In 1986, Hart declined to seek re-election for the Senate and began his presidential campaign. In May 1987, as he was the front-runner for the Democratic nomination, an extramarital affair of his with Donna Rice was publicized by the Miami Herald, and he dropped out of the campaign after The Washington Post threatened to reveal another affair. He restarted the campaign in December, but dropped out after the New Hampshire primary. The Democratic nomination went to Michael Dukakis, who lost the general election to George H. W. Bush.

== Background ==
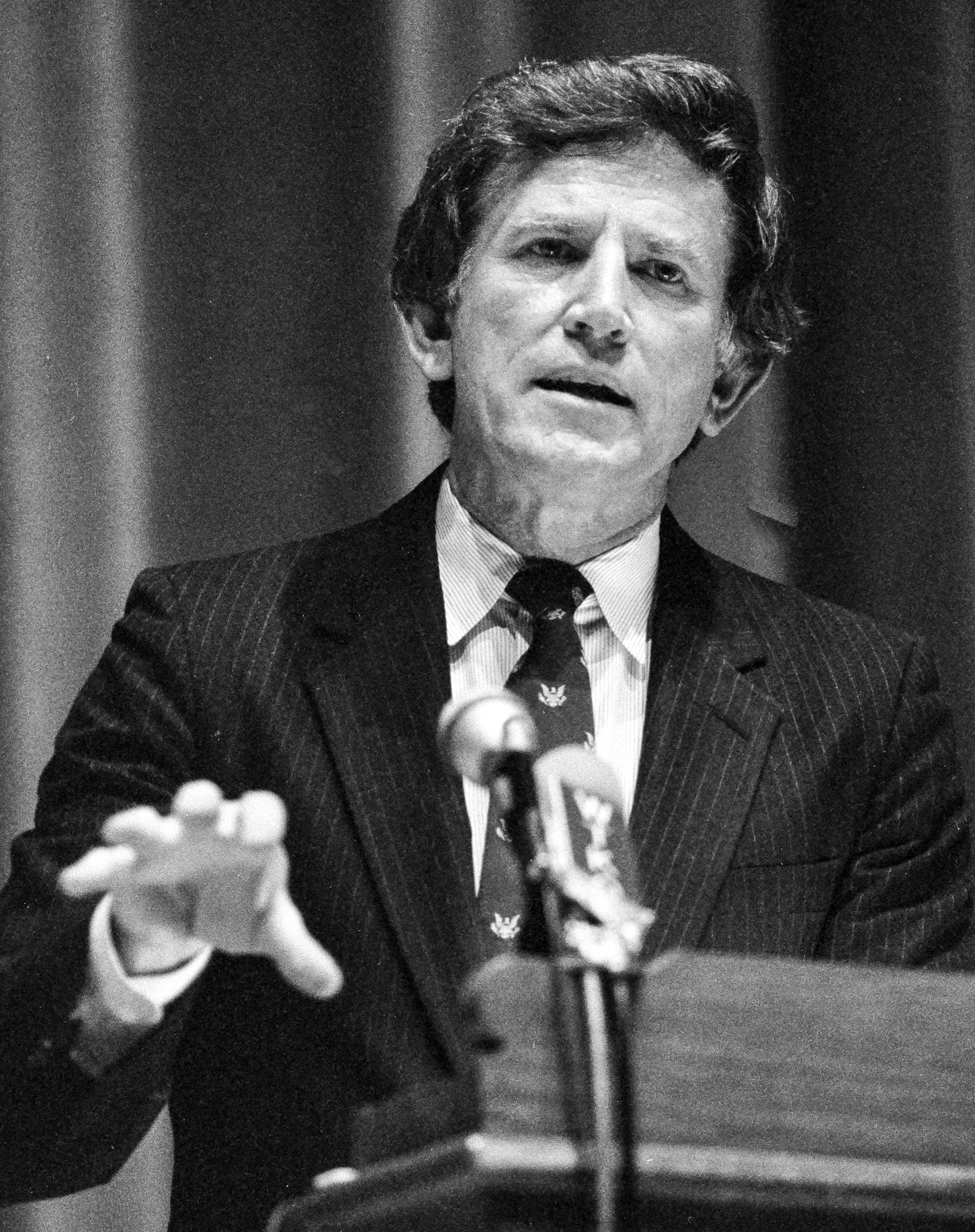
Gary Hart in 1987

Gary Hart was the national campaign director for George McGovern's 1972 presidential campaign. Hart, a Democrat represented Colorado in the U.S. Senate from 1975 to 1987. He ran for president in 1984, losing the Democratic nomination to Walter Mondale. Hart won 26 states compared to Mondale's 19, but Mondale gained more delegates.

== Campaign ==
Hart announced his campaign in 1987. He wanted to reduce America's dependence on oil and defuse the country's escalating military situation in the Persian Gulf. The Atlantic later wrote that "[in] early 1987, the Hart campaign had an air of likelihood if not inevitability that is difficult to imagine in retrospect. After Mondale's landslide defeat by Ronald Reagan in 1984, Hart had become the heir apparent and best hope to lead the [Democratic Party] back to the White House." After New York Governor Mario Cuomo announced that he was not running for president, Hart became the most favored presidential candidate in many national polls, beating the likely successor to Reagan, George H. W. Bush. However, by spring 1987, Hart was under accusations by reporters of being dishonest. Gail Sheehy, a Vanity Fair reporter who covered both of Hart's presidential campaigns, wrote that he frequently lied about even innocuous subjects, such as whether he played varsity sports in high school.

=== Infidelity scandal and initial exit from the race ===
Rumors of Hart's infidelity had been around since his work for George McGovern in 1972, but they had never been as public. Multiple presidents and presidential candidates before had also cheated on their wives, but by the late 1980s, a younger liberal generation had begun to see it as a kind of political betrayal. There was also a growing amount of journalists in the field of investigative journalism, inspired by Bob Woodward and Carl Bernstein's work in the 1970s which publicized the Watergate scandal.

In late March 1987, Hart sailed with two women on a yacht from Miami to Bimini named Monkey Business; they were Donna Rice and Lynn Armandt. A month later, the man who invited Hart on the yacht, lawyer and lobbyist William Broadhurst, brought the two women to Washington D.C.; Miami Herald editor Tom Fielder was given an anonymous tip about this beforehand on April 27, 1987, amidst rumors Hart had been having an affair with Rice. The tip was given by Rice's friend, Dana Weems; she was only revealed as the anonymous source in 2014. Beginning on May 1, 1987, Herald reporter Jim McGee staked out Hart's townhouse in Washington D.C., wearing a hooded parka and sunglasses as a disguise. At the time, Hart's wife Lee was in Denver. McGee caught Hart and Rice entering his house on Friday, May 1. Overnight, McGee had called other reporters, and now had four other people scouting the house. On Saturday, Hart and Rice ran into the group on their way out of the house to go to dinner. Hart noticed McGee, whose disguise looked suspicious. He and Rice then went back into the house. He called Broadhurst to pick her up, and she left the house through the back door. However, photos had already been taken of the incident. The Herald published the photos on May 3 in a 7,000-word article, "Miami woman is linked to Hart".

The front page of the National Enquirer for June 2, 1987, showing the photo of Hart and Donna Rice

At a televised press conference in New Hampshire, when a reporter asked Hart if he had ever committed adultery, he responded, "I don't have to answer that." In another press conference, he stated he and Rice were "just pals". He ultimately challenged reporters to prove his infidelity: "Follow me around. I don't care. I'm serious. If anybody wants to put a tail on me, go ahead. They'd be very bored." There is a common misconception that the latter quote came before the stakeout incident, but it was actually after. Lee Hart stood for her husband's innocence, saying: "I know Gary better than anyone else, and when Gary says nothing happened, nothing happened."

A picture then surfaced of Rice sitting on Hart's lap, while he was wearing a shirt labeled "Monkey Business Crew". It was published on the front cover of the National Enquirer on June 2, 1987. In 1991, Lee Atwater, the campaign strategist for George H.W. Bush's 1988 presidential campaign, told a reporter as a deathbed confession that he had set up the Monkey Business incident. This is unconfirmed, as setting up the incident would be very complicated.

After the Herald report, Hart still continued campaigning for a week, but The Washington Post threatened to release details about an affair of his with another woman. He then quit the race.

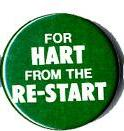
A campaign button for Hart's second attempt

=== Second attempt at the campaign ===
In August 1987, one of Hart's former campaign operatives hinted that he may be re-entering the Democratic race. This news received negative reactions in the media. In September, Hart officially apologized for his infidelity. In December 1987, Hart officially announced his re-entry. After having poor results in the 1988 New Hampshire primary, he dropped out of the race permanently. Dukakis won the nomination, but lost the general election to George H.W. Bush.

== Aftermath ==
After the campaign, Hart began practicing law again and working on issues of national security. In January 2003, he commented that he was considering running for president in the 2004 election, but he declined to run in May 2003.

In 2018, a biopic film about the infidelity scandals' effect on Hart's campaign, The Front Runner, was released. Hugh Jackman played Hart.
