= 1988 Iowa Democratic presidential caucuses =

First nominating contest ahead of the presidential election

- February 8, 1988

52 Democratic National Convention delegates
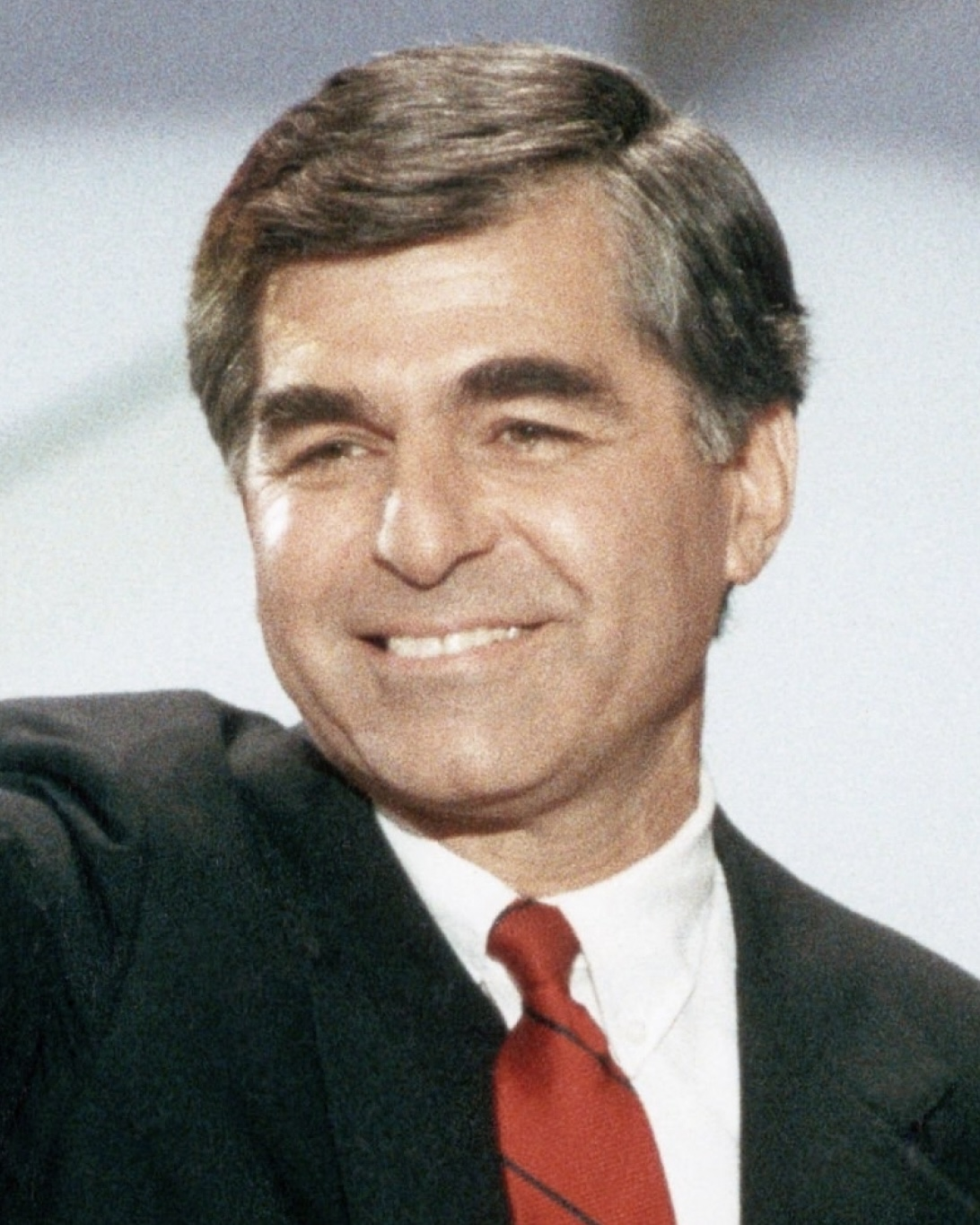

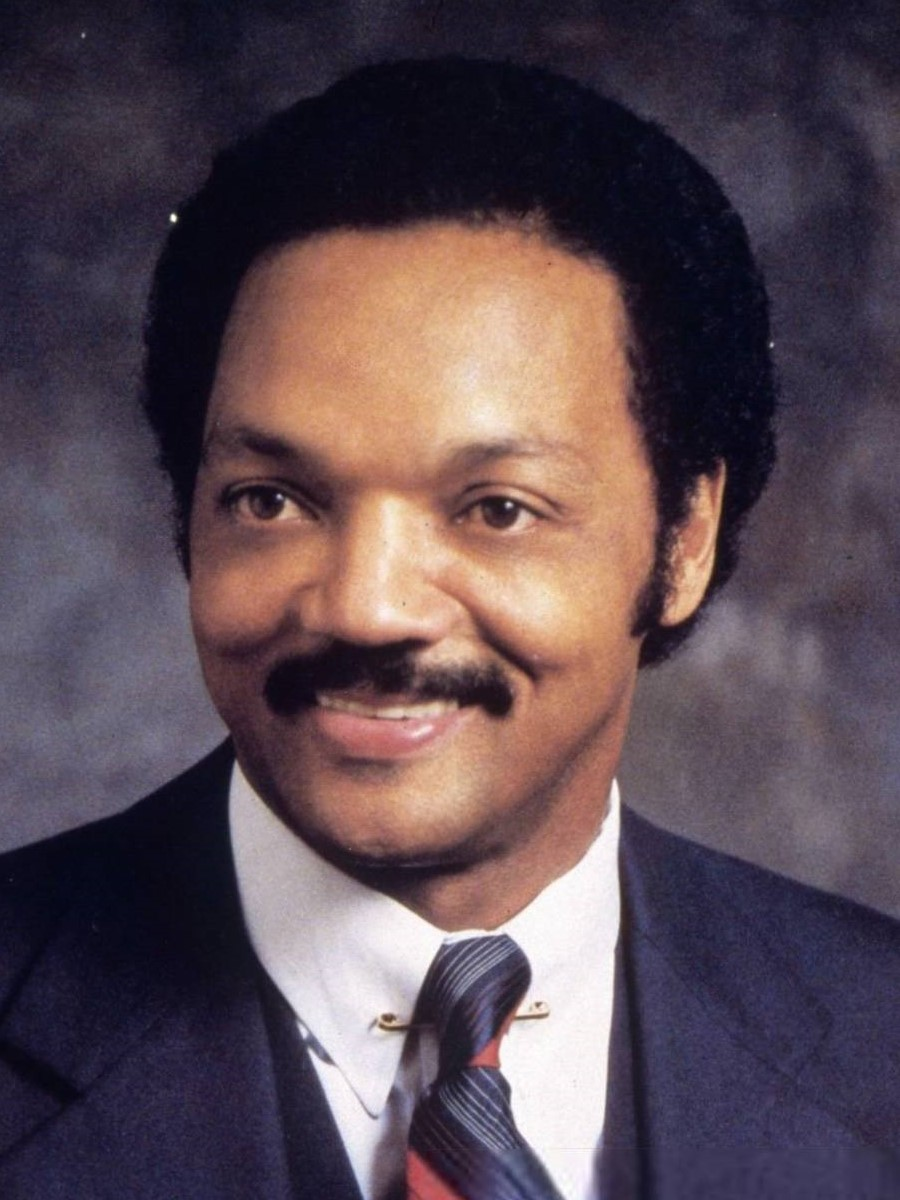

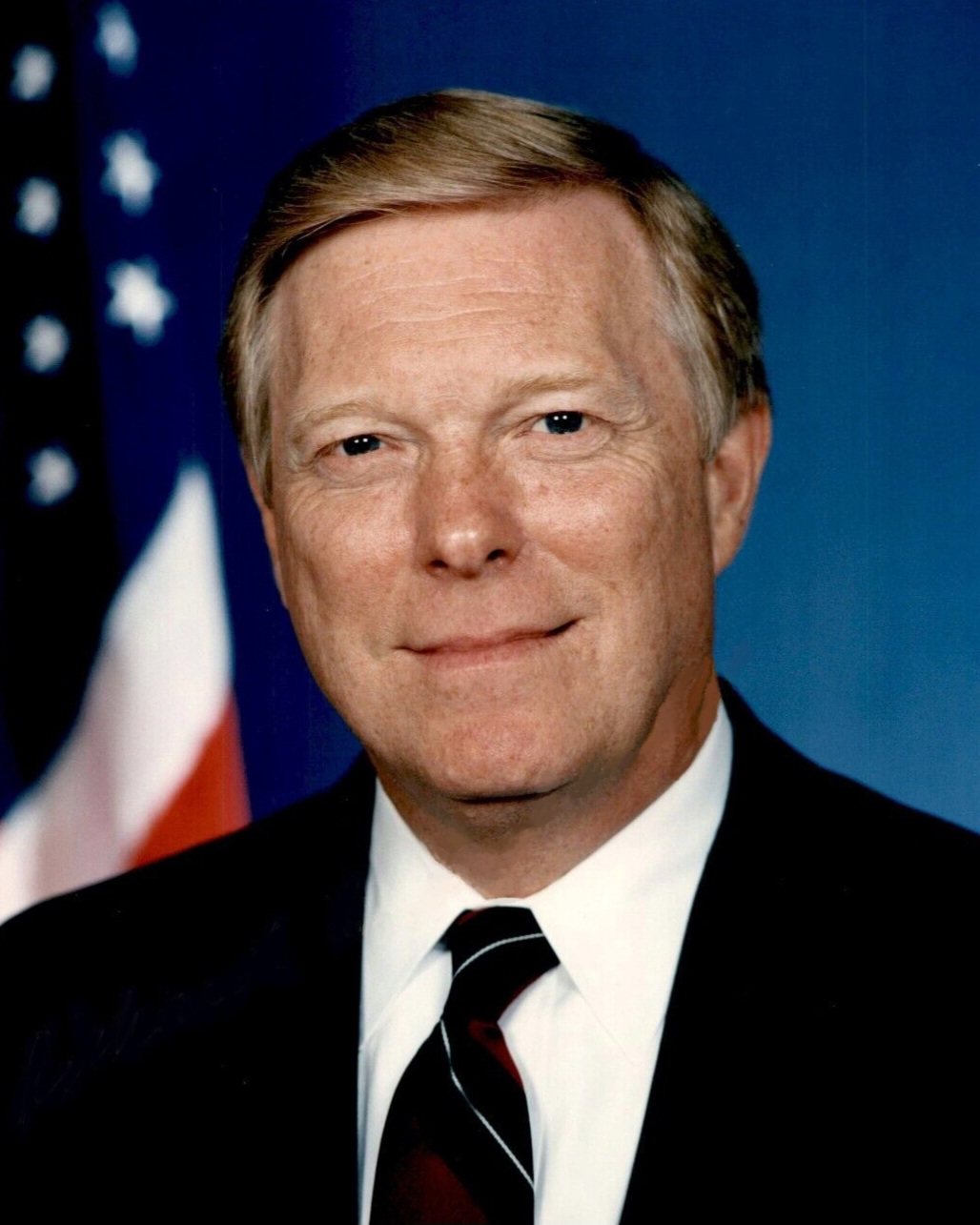

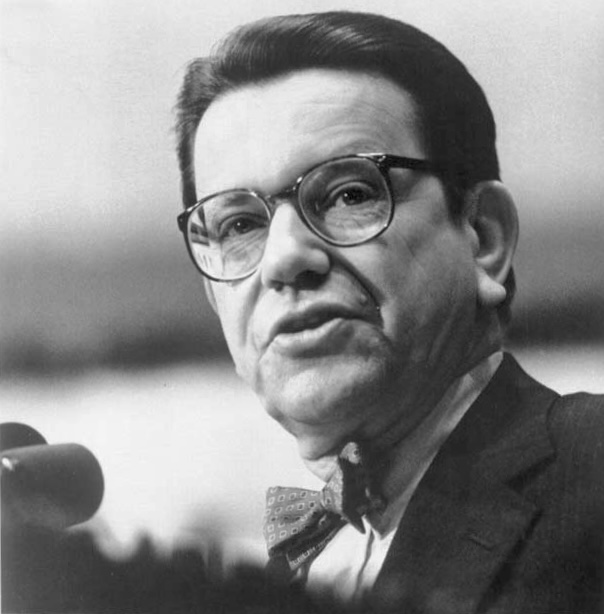

Candidate	Michael Dukakis	Jesse Jackson	Dick Gephardt
Home state	Massachusetts	South Carolina	Missouri
Delegate count	22	12	8
Percentage of SDEs	28.7%	13.1%	27.9%
Candidate	Paul Simon	Uncommitted
Home state	Illinois	–
Delegate count	6	4
Percentage of SDEs	26.4%	3.9%

Caucuses in Iowa for the Democratic presidential nomination were held on February 8, marking the Democratic Party's first nominating contest in their series of presidential primaries ahead of the 1988 presidential election.

Dick Gephardt, having focused his campaign against offshoring, won a plurality in the preference vote and precinct caucuses. However, Michael Dukakis, who placed third in both of those contests, received a plurality of the delegates to the national convention.

== Procedure ==
Iowa had 58 delegates to the 1988 Democratic National Convention, with six of those being unelected superdelegates. Voters assembled across 2,487 precincts to caucus on February 8, 1988. Candidates who receive at least 15% of the vote in the precinct caucuses will be given delegates to for the county conventions. 3,001 delegates would be elected at county conventions on March 26, 1988, to then vote for 34 delegates to the national convention at district conventions on May 14. The remaining 18 delegates are then selected at the Iowa Democratic Party's state convention on June 25.

== Campaign ==
Gephardt's campaign focused on attacks against offshoring. He was the first presidential candidate to visit all of Iowa's counties in the 1988 cycle. Gephardt's campaign chose to conduct its advertising in January, months after all of the other campaigns. Majority Leader Tom Foley and 41 other members of the United States House of Representatives, accounting for half of U.S. Representatives that endorsed Gephardt, attended events in Des Moines and Cedar Rapids, Iowa, on January 28.

Bruce Babbitt focused his campaign on Iowa, hoping to repeat Jimmy Carter's result in the 1976 caucuses that propelled him to the nomination. Babbitt's first major activity in Iowa was campaigning with his family by riding in the RAGBRAI using Schwinn bicycles for a week, stopping every 10 miles to talk with voters. Chris Hamel, his campaign coordinator for Iowa, said that they did this to stand out from the other candidates.

Iowa was suffering from the 1980s farm crisis. Simon attacked Gephardt for supporting the 1980 grain embargo against the Soviet Union. Michael Dukakis was criticized for his suggestions to Iowa farmers that they grow apples, blueberries, flowers, or Belgian endives rather than corn or soybeans; Governor Bill Clinton derided it as "yuppie agriculture".

Pro-Palestinian activists picketed Gephardt and Simon's offices in Iowa City on January 22, 1988, in protest of the presidential candidates ignoring issues relating to Palestine and the Middle East. Bill Cosby conducted a benefit performance for Jackson's campaign on January 24. Gore withdrew most of his staff from Iowa in January.

=== Debates and forums ===
1988 Iowa Democratic presidential caucuses debates
No.	Date & Time	Host	Location	Moderator	Participants						
Key: P Participant A Absent N Non-invitee I Invitee
Key: P Participant A Absent N Non-invitee I Invitee					Bruce Babbitt	Michael Dukakis	Dick Gephardt	Al Gore	Gary Hart	Jesse Jackson	Paul Simon
1	January 11, 1988; 7:00 p.m. CDT	Greater Sioux City Press Club	Morningside University	Brad Robertson; Mike Townsend	P	P	P	P	A	A	P
2	January 23, 1988	Presidential Forum on Agriculture	Iowa State University		P	P	P	A	P	P	P

== Polling ==
Poll source	Date(s) administered	Sample size	Margin of error	Bruce Babbitt	Michael Dukakis	Dick Gephardt	Al Gore	Gary Hart	Jesse Jackson	Paul Simon	Others	Undecided
Boston Herald; WBZ-TV	January 1988	401 LV		9%	18%	28%	2%	2%	8%	14%	–	–

== Results ==
Gephardt won a plurality in the preference vote and precinct caucuses followed by Simon and Dukakis. The percentage of delegates Gephardt, Simon, and Dukakis received was greater than the percentage of the preference vote they received. The percentage of delegates for all of the other candidates was less than the percentage of the vote they received. Despite Dukakis placing third in the initial contest, the county conventions produced a plurality of delegates for him and Gephardt ended his presidential campaign that same day.

Bonnie Campbell, the chair of the Iowa Democratic Party, endorsed Dukakis on May 11, and called for the district convention delegates to unanimously support him; the 5th district convention passed a resolution calling for her to stop campaigning for Dukakis. At the district conventions Dukakis won a total of twelve delegates, Gephardt won eight, Jackson won seven, Simon won six, and one uncommitted delegate was selected. Dukakis received the most delegates in the 1st, 5th, and 6th congressional districts, tied with Gephardt in the 2nd, 3rd congressional districts, and the Iowa's 4th congressional district produced a tie between Dukakis, Gephardt, and Jackson.

At the state convention Dukakis received ten delegates. Gephardt's supporters elected three uncommitted delegates, but instructed them to vote for Dukakis on the first ballot. Five delegates were given to Jackson.

1988 Iowa Democratic presidential caucuses
Candidate	Preference vote	Precinct caucuses	County conventions (99.4% reporting)	District convention delegates	State convention delegates	Total delegates
Michael Dukakis	20.5%	22.2%	28.7%	12	10	22
Jesse Jackson	11.1%	8.8%	13.1%	7	5	12
Dick Gephardt	27.4%	31.3%	27.9%	8	0	8
Paul Simon	24.3%	26.7%	26.4%	6	0	6
Uncommitted	6.0%	4.5%	3.9%	1	3	4
Bruce Babbitt	9.2%	6.1%	0	0	0	0
Gary Hart	1.0%	0.3%	0	0	0	0
Al Gore	0.2%	0%	0	0	0	0
Total	100%	100%	3,001	34	18	58

== Endorsements ==
Bruce Babbitt endorsements

State legislators

- Tom Miller, 31st and 33rd Attorney General of Iowa (1979–1991; 1995–2023)
Michael Dukakis endorsements

Federal officials

- Dick Clark, U.S. Senator from Iowa (1973–1979)
- John Culver, U.S. Senator from Iowa (1975–1981)

Party officials

- Bonnie Campbell, chair of the Iowa Democratic Party
Dick Gephardt endorsements

Statewide officials

- Jo Ann Zimmerman, 42nd Lieutenant Governor of Iowa (1987–1991)

State legislators

- Donald Avenson, IA-15 (1973–1983), IA-28 (1983–1991) and Speaker (1983–1990)
- Bill Hutchins, IA-28 (1977–1983), IA-48 (1983–1992) and Senate Majority Leader

Local officials

- Loren Callendar, mayor of Sioux City, Iowa

Party officials

- Ed Campbell, former chair of the Iowa Democratic Party
- Betty McMahon, chair of the Muscatine County Democratic Party
Al Gore endorsements

State legislators

- Thomas E. Swartz, IA-39 (1981-1983), IA-72 (1983-1989)
Jesse Jackson endorsements

State legislators

- Thomas Mann, IA-43 (1983-1989)
Paul Simon endorsements

Federal officials

- Berkley Bedell, IA-06 (1975–1987)
- Harold Hughes, U.S. Senator from Iowa (1969–1975)

State legislators

- Lowell Junkins, IA-43 (1973–1983), IA-35 (1983–1985) and Majority Leader

== Works cited ==
=== Books ===
- The Iowa Official Register: 1991-1992 (PDF). Secretary of State of Iowa. 1993.
- Duncan, Philip, ed. (1988). Candidates 88'. Congressional Quarterly. ISBN 087187458X.

=== News ===
- "Babbitt takes jab at Simon, gets hit back". The Des Moines Register. January 31, 1988. p. 1B – via Newspapers.com.
- "Caucuses don't pick Iowa delegates". Quad-City Times. February 9, 1988. p. 8 – via Newspapers.com.
- "County conventions boost Dukakis into top position". The Daily Nonpareil. March 28, 1988. p. 2A – via Newspapers.com.
- "Demo presidential debate here tonight". Sioux City Journal. January 11, 1988. p. A1 – via Newspapers.com.
- "Democrats gang up on Gephardt". Quad-City Times. January 24, 1988. p. 1A – via Newspapers.com.
- "Dukakis gains at Iowa district conventions". The Des Moines Register. May 15, 1988. p. 1B – via Newspapers.com.
- "Dukakis gains at Iowa district conventions". The Des Moines Register. May 15, 1988. p. 4B – via Newspapers.com.
- "Gephardt announces today". Muscatine Journal. March 28, 1988. p. 1A – via Newspapers.com.
- "Gephardt's wife here Thursday". Muscatine Journal. January 13, 1988. p. 3A – via Newspapers.com.
- "Palestinian supporters picket candidates' offices". Sioux City Journal. January 23, 1988. p. 3A – via Newspapers.com.
- "Poll: Gephardt has 10-point lead in Iowa". The Clarion-Ledger. February 2, 1988. p. 5A. Archived from the original on February 24, 2024 – via Newspapers.com.
- "Three local officials will back Gephardt". Sioux City Journal. January 25, 1988. p. A3 – via Newspapers.com.
- Balzar, John (January 18, 1988). "GOP Uses Secret Ballot; Democrats Take Public Stand : Iowa Caucuses: Study in Party Contrasts". Los Angeles Times. Archived from the original on May 5, 2025.
- Daubenmier, Judy (November 23, 1987). "Candidates hoping endorsements will tip balance in Iowa". The Gazette. p. 4A – via Newspapers.com.
- Davidson, Tom (January 22, 1988). "Gephardt: A driven man pushing change". Quad-City Times. p. 7 – via Newspapers.com.
- Keller, Des (January 17, 1988). "Gephardt blasts exporting U.S. jobs". The Waterloo-Cedar Falls Courier. p. B3 – via Newspapers.com.
- Kueter, Dale (January 29, 1988). "Only in Iowa: A 'choir' of congressmen". The Gazette. p. 5A – via Newspapers.com.
- Schuelke, Kent (January 23, 1988). "Still plenty of tickets for Cosby". Iowa City Press-Citizen. p. 1A – via Newspapers.com.
- Sullivan, Ken (January 29, 1988). "42 congressmen, majority leader in Iowa to win votes for Gephardt". The Gazette. p. 5A – via Newspapers.com.
- Sullivan, Ken (January 24, 1988). "Candidates cultivate farm issues". The Gazette. p. 1A – via Newspapers.com.
- Sullivan, Ken (June 26, 1988). "Dems work to fill roster". The Gazette. p. 3A – via Newspapers.com.
- Yepsen, David; Norman, Jane (January 31, 1988). "Gephardt, Dole lead run to wire". The Des Moines Register. p. 9A – via Newspapers.com.
- Yepsen, David; Norman, Jane (January 31, 1988). "Gephardt on a roll; can Bush catch Dole?". The Des Moines Register. p. 1A – via Newspapers.com.
- Yepsen, David (March 28, 1988). "Democrats display unity, look for victory in the fall". The Des Moines Register. p. 1A – via Newspapers.com.
