= 1988 Democratic Party presidential primaries =

Selection of the Democratic Party nominee

- February 8 to June 14, 1988

4,105 delegates to the Democratic National Convention 2,053 (majority) votes needed to win
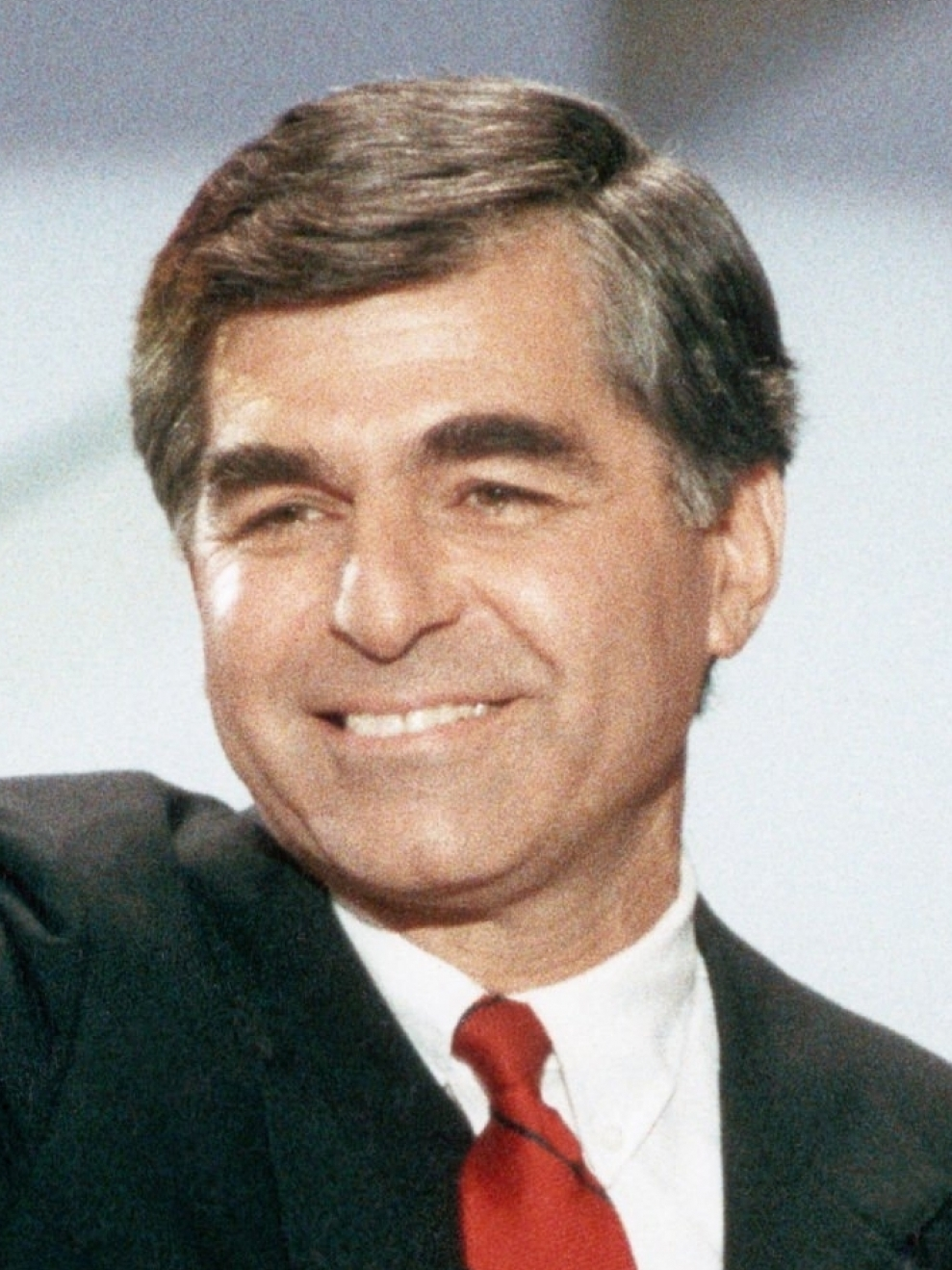

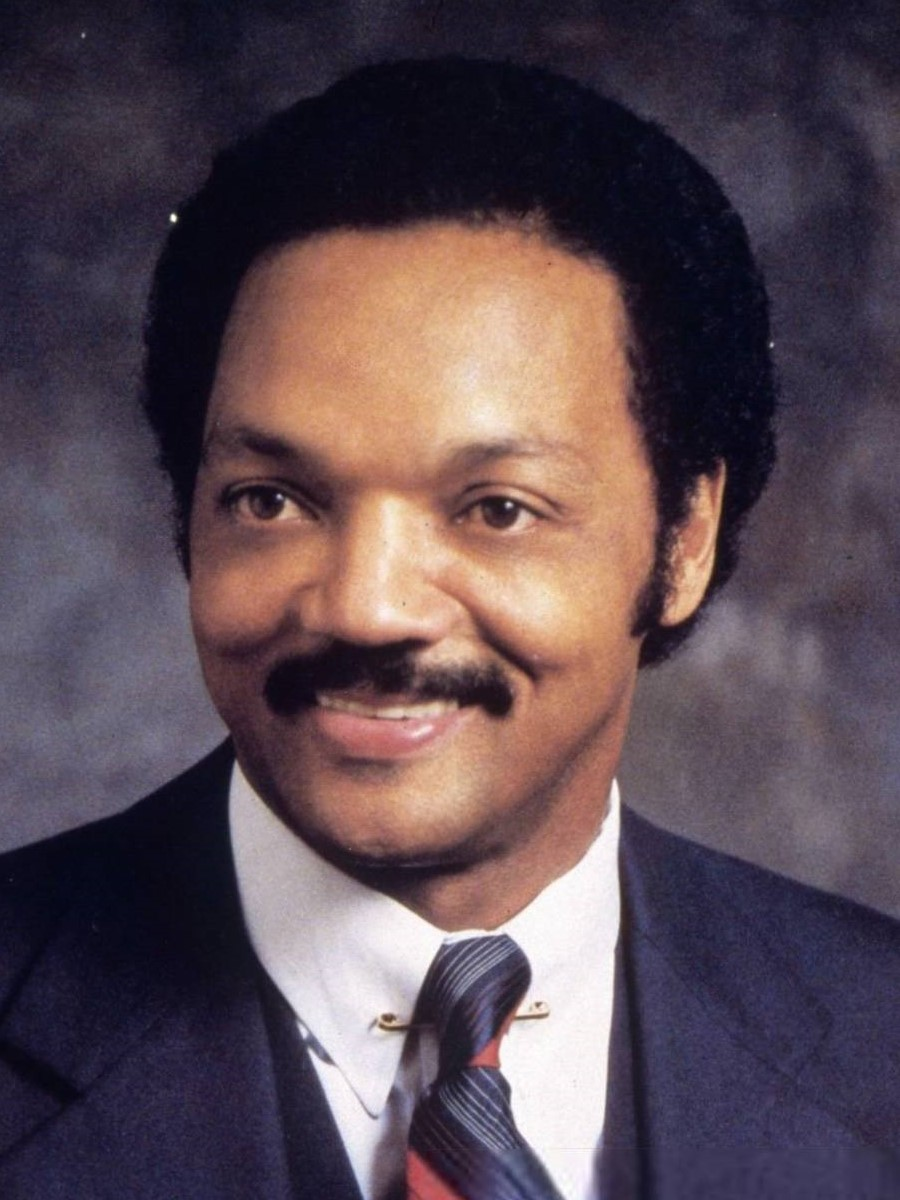

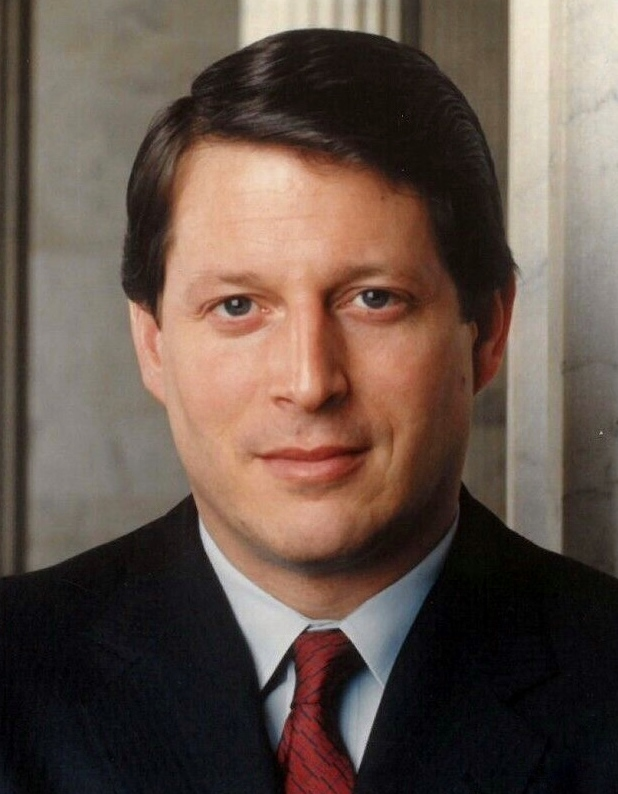

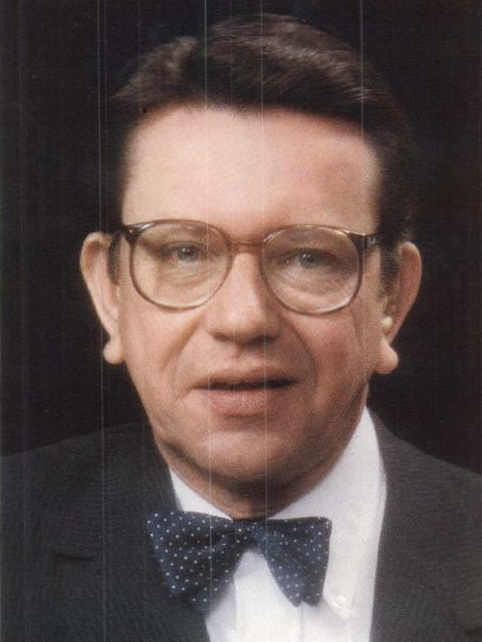

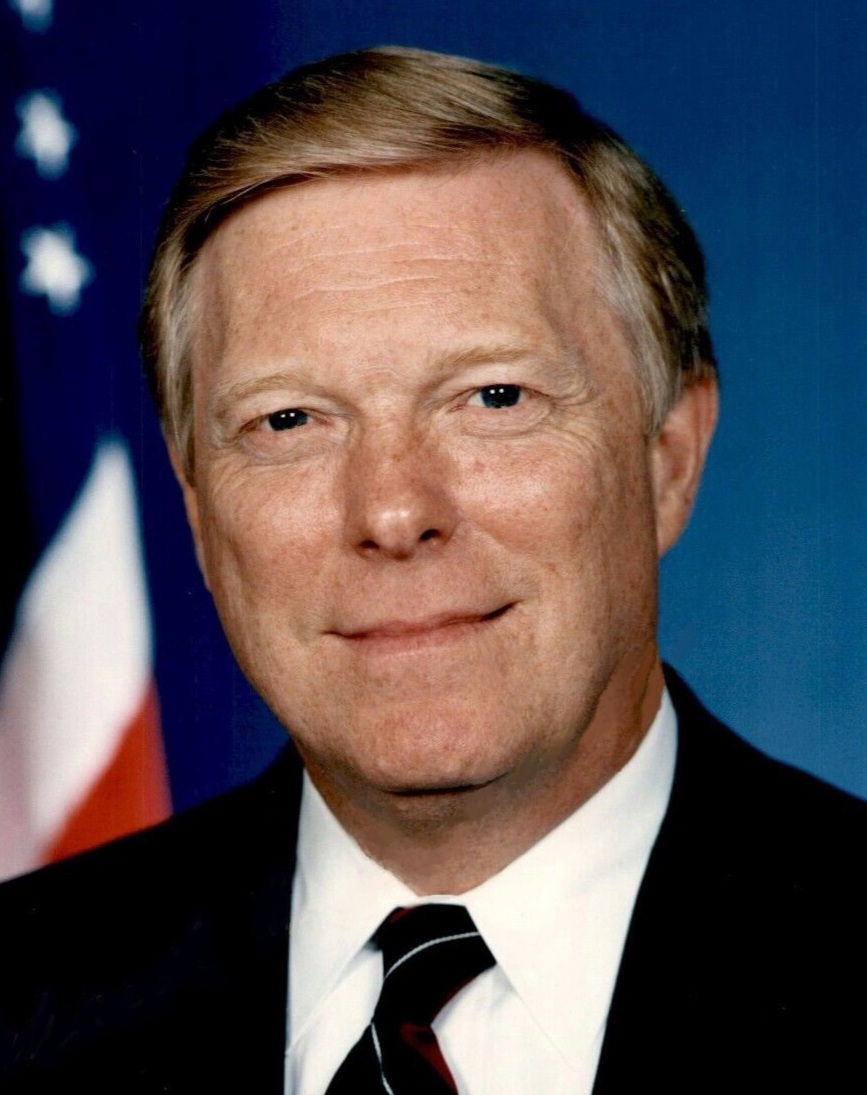
Candidate	Michael Dukakis	Jesse Jackson	Al Gore
Home state	Massachusetts	Illinois	Tennessee
Delegate count	1,726.5	1,056	375
Contests won	30	13	7
Popular vote	9,705,590	6,732,778	3,124,278
Percentage	42.17%	29.26%	13.58%
Candidate	Paul Simon	Dick Gephardt
Home state	Illinois	Missouri
Delegate count	147	126
Contests won	1	3
Popular vote	1,078,112	1,432,080
Percentage	4.68%	6.22%

Michael Dukakis
Paul Simon
Jesse Jackson
Richard Gephardt
Al Gore
Uncommitted
Previous Democratic nominee
Walter Mondale
Democratic nominee
Michael Dukakis

From February 8 to June 14, 1988, voters of the Democratic Party chose its nominee for president in the 1988 United States presidential election. Massachusetts governor Michael Dukakis was selected as the nominee through a series of primary elections and caucuses culminating in the 1988 Democratic National Convention held from July 18 to July 21, 1988, in Atlanta, Georgia.

== Background ==
Having been badly defeated in the 1984 presidential election, the Democrats in 1985 and 1986 were eager to find a new approach to win the presidency. They created the Democratic Leadership Council (DLC), with the aim of recruiting a candidate for the 1988 election.

The large gains in the 1986 mid-term elections (which resulted in the Democrats taking back control of the Senate after six years of Republican rule) and the continuing Iran–Contra affair gave Democrats confidence in the run-up to the primary season.

== Pre-primary events ==
=== The Hart-Rice affair ===
The Democratic front-runner for most of 1987 was former Colorado Senator Gary Hart. Hart had made a strong showing in the 1984 primaries and, after Mondale's defeat in the presidential election, had positioned himself as the moderate centrist many Democrats felt their party would need to win.

However, questions and rumors about possible extramarital affairs and about past debts dogged Hart's campaign. One of the great myths is that Senator Hart challenged the media to "put a tail" on him and that reporters then took him up on that challenge. In fact, Hart had told E. J. Dionne of The New York Times that if reporters followed him around, they would "be bored". However, in a separate investigation, the Miami Herald claimed to have received an anonymous tip from a friend of Donna Rice that Rice was involved with Hart. It was only after Hart had been discovered that the Herald reporters found Hart's quote in a pre-print of The New York Times Magazine.

On May 8, 1987, a week after the Donna Rice story broke, Hart dropped out of the race.

In December 1987, Hart surprised many political pundits by resuming his presidential campaign. He again led in the polls for the Democratic nomination, both nationally and in Iowa. However, the allegations of adultery and reports of irregularities in his campaign financing had delivered a fatal blow to his candidacy, and he fared poorly in the early primaries before dropping out again.

The Hart scandal would later be depicted in the 2018 film The Front Runner, with Hugh Jackman portraying Hart.

=== Biden plagiarism scandals ===
Delaware Senator Joe Biden led a highly competitive campaign which ended in controversy after he was accused of plagiarizing a speech by Neil Kinnock, then-leader of the British Labour Party. Though Biden had correctly credited the original author in all speeches but one, the one of which he failed to make mention of the originator was caught on video and sent to the press by members of the Dukakis campaign. In the video Biden is filmed repeating a stump speech by Kinnock, with only minor modifications. Michael Dukakis later acknowledged that his campaign was responsible for leaking the tape, and two members of his staff resigned.

It was also reported that Biden had been guilty of plagiarism years before, while a student at the Syracuse University College of Law in the 1960s. Though Biden professed his integrity, the impression lingering in the media as the result of this double punch would lead him to drop out of the race. He formally suspended his campaign on September 28, 1987.

The Delaware Supreme Court's Board on Professional Responsibility would later clear Biden of the law school plagiarism charges.

After campaigns in 2008 and 2020, Biden was elected the 47th vice president in 2008 and 2012 and the 46th president in 2020.

=== Overview ===
Active campaign	Exploratory committee	Withdrawn candidate	Democratic National Convention
Midterm elections	Debates	Primaries	Democratic National Convention

== Candidates ==
=== Nominee ===
Candidate	Most recent office	Home state	Campaign	Delegates won	Popular vote	Contests won	Running mate
Michael Dukakis	Governor of Massachusetts (1975–1979, 1983–1991)	Massachusetts	(Campaign); Secured nomination: June 7, 1988	1,726.5 (48.77%)	9,705,590 (42.18%)	30	Lloyd Bentsen

=== Eliminated at convention ===
Candidate	Most recent office	Home state	Campaign Withdrawal date	Delegates won	Popular vote	Contests won
Jesse Jackson	President of PUSH (1971–2023)	South Carolina	(Campaign); Lost at convention: July 21, 1988	1,056 (29.83%)	6,732,778 (29.26%)	13

=== Withdrew during primaries ===
Candidate	Most recent office	Home state	Campaign Withdrawal date	Delegates won	Popular vote	Contests won
Al Gore	U.S. Senator from Tennessee (1985–1993)	Tennessee	(Campaign); Withdrew: April 21, 1988	375 (9.44%)	3,124,278 (13.58%)	7
Paul Simon	U.S. Senator from Illinois (1985–1997)	Illinois	(Campaign); Withdrew: April 7, 1988	147 (4.15%)	1,078,112 (4.68%)	1
Dick Gephardt	U.S. Representative from Missouri (1977–2005)	Missouri	(Campaign); Withdrew: March 29, 1988	126 (3.56%)	1,432,080 (6.22%)	3
Gary Hart	U.S. Senator from Colorado (1975–1987)	Colorado	(Campaign); Suspended: May 8, 1987; Re-entered: December 12, 1987; Withdrew: March 12, 1988	1 (0.03%)	354,298 (1.54%)	0
Bruce Babbitt	Governor of Arizona (1978–1987)	Arizona	(Campaign); Withdrew: February 18, 1988	0 (0.00%)	80,483 (0.35%)	0

=== Withdrew before primaries ===
Candidate	Experience	Home state	Campaign Withdrawal date
Pat Schroeder	U.S. Representative from Colorado (1973–1997)	Colorado	(Campaign); Withdrew: September 28, 1987
Joe Biden	U.S. Senator from Delaware (1973–2009)	Delaware	(Campaign); Withdrew: September 23, 1987

=== Minor candidates ===
Other notable individuals campaigning for the nomination but not featuring in major polls were:

Douglas Applegate	David Duke	Lyndon LaRouche	Andy Sundberg	James Traficant
U.S. Representative from Ohio (1977-1995) (Campaign)	No elected office (Grand Wizard of the KKK) (1974-1980) (Campaign)	No elected office (Head of the NCLB) (1968-2019)	No elected office (Chair of Democrats Abroad) (1981-1985)	U.S. Representative from Ohio (1985-2002)

=== Declined ===
Lloyd Bentsen	Robert C. Byrd	Ted Kennedy	Lee Iacocca	Mario Cuomo	Sam Nunn
U.S. Senator from Texas (1971–1993)	U.S. Senator from West Virginia (1959–2010)	U.S. Senator from Massachusetts (1962–2009)	Businessman from Pennsylvania (1978–1992)	Governor of New York (1983–1994)	U.S. Senator from Georgia (1972–1997)
		(December 19, 1985)	(July 16, 1986)	(February 19, 1987)	(February 21, 1987)
Dale Bumpers	Bill Clinton	Bill Bradley	Dick Celeste	Chuck Robb	
U.S. Senator from Arkansas (1975–1999)	Governor of Arkansas (1979-1981, 1983-1992)	U.S. Senator from New Jersey (1979–1997)	Governor of Ohio (1983–1991)	Former Governor of Virginia (1982–1986)	
(March 20, 1987)	(July 15, 1987)	(August 2, 1987)	(August 24, 1987)	(November 12, 1987)	

== Polling ==
Poll source	Dates conducted	Gary Hart	Michael Dukakis	Jesse Jackson	Al Gore	Richard Gephardt	Paul Simon	Joseph Biden	Patricia Shroeder	Bruce Babbitt	Edward Kennedy	Mario Cuomo	Lee Iacocca	Geraldine Ferraro	Bill Bradley	Tom Bradley	Jay Rockefeller	Chuck Robb	Mark White	Dianne Feinstein	Sam Nunn	Dale Bumpers	Tony Coelho	Others
Gallup (Note: Poll combines first- and second-choice responses.)	Jun. 7-10, 1985	31%	-	14%	-	-	-	1%	*%	1%	46%	15%	11%	12%	4%	5%	3%	3%	1%	2%	1%	2%	*%	-
Gallup	Jan. 10-13, 1986	47%	-	16%	-	-	-	1%	1%	1%	-	22%	18%	-	8%	8%	6%	3%	5%	3%	3%	1%	1%	-
Gallup	Apr. 11-14, 1986	39%	-	18%	-	-	-	1%	2%	1%	-	27%	14%	-	6%	7%	6%	5%	2%	4%	2%	2%	*%	-
Gallup	Jun. 9-16, 1986	55%	-	-	-	-	-	-	-	-	-	30%	-	-	-	-	-	-	-	-	-	-	-	-
Gallup	Jun. 9-16, 1986	75%	-	14%	-	-	-	-	-	-	-	-	-	-	-	-	-	-	-	-	-	-	-	-
Gallup	Jun. 9-16, 1986	59%	-	-	-	-	-	-	-	-	-	-	28%	-	-	-	-	-	-	-	-	-	-	-
Gallup	Jul. 11-14, 1986	34%	-	17%	-	-	-	-	-	-	-	22%	26%	-	7%	7%	6%	3%	3%	3%	-	-	-	-
Gallup	Sep. 3-17, 1986	54%	-	-	-	-	-	-	-	-	-	29%	-	-	-	-	-	-	-	-	-	-	-	-
Gallup	Sep. 3-17, 1986	74%	-	15%	-	-	-	-	-	-	-	-	-	-	-	-	-	-	-	-	-	-	-	-
Gallup	Sep. 3-17, 1986	58%	-	-	-	-	-	-	-	-	-	-	29%	-	-	-	-	-	-	-	-	-	-	-
Gallup	Oct. 24-27, 1986	32%	-	14%	-	-	-	-	-	-	-	27%	26%	-	8%	7%	6%	3%	3%	-	-	-	-	-
Gallup	Jan. 16-19, 1987	32%	1%	14%	-	*%	-	1%	-	1%	-	13%	15%	-	4%	-	-	3%	-	-	1%	1%	-	-
Gallup	Jan. 16-19, 1987	37%	2%	14%	-	*%	-	1%	-	1%	-	-	17%	-	5%	-	-	3%	-	-	2%	2%	-	-
WaPo-ABC News	Jan. 15-19, 1987	39%	-	13%	-	1%	-	1%	-	2%	-	18%	-	-	-	-	-	3%	-	-	4%	-	-	-
NYT-CBS News	Jan. 18-21, 1987	33%	1%	9%	-	2%	-	1%	-	1%	-	17%	-	-	-	-	-	-	-	-	3%	-	-	-
WaPo-ABC News	Mar. 5-9, 1987	46%	4%	14%	-	3%	-	1%	-	1%	-	18%	-	-	-	-	-	2%	-	-	4%	3%	-	-
Gallup	Apr. 10-13, 1987	-	7%	27%	6%	6%	-	2%	-	4%	-	-	-	-	-	-	-	-	-	-	-	-	-	12%
WaPo-ABC News	May 4, 1987	36%	9%	12%	-	-	-	-	-	-	-	-	-	-	-	-	-	-	-	-	-	-	-	-
NYT-CBS News	May 5-6, 1987	32%	6%	10%	1%	4%	-	1%	-	1%	-	-	-	-	-	-	-	-	-	-	-	-	-	1% (Note: Support for Bill Clinton)
Gallup	May 6-7, 1987	-	11%	22%	6%	7%	9%	1%	-	2%	-	-	-	-	-	-	-	-	-	-	-	-	-	5%
May 8: Gary Hart suspends campaign
NYT-CBS News	May 11-14, 1987	-	11%	17%	5%	4%	6%	2%	-	2%	-	-	-	-	-	-	-	-	-	-	-	-	-	2% (Note: Support for Bill Clinton)
NYT-CBS News	May 11-14, 1987	-	6%	12%	4%	3%	5%	1%	-	3%	-	25%	-	-	6%	-	-	-	-	-	4%	-	-	2% (Note: Support for Bill Clinton)
WaPo-ABC News	May 28 - Jun. 1, 1987	-	11%	25%	5%	10%	13%	3%	-	4%	-	1%	-	-	-	-	-	-	-	-	-	-	-	7%
Gallup	Jun. 8-14, 1987	-	11%	18%	5%	7%	7%	7%	-	2%	-	-	-	-	-	-	-	-	-	-	-	-	-	5%
Gallup	Jul. 10-13, 1987	-	13%	17%	8%	3%	7%	4%	-	2%	-	-	-	-	-	-	-	-	-	-	-	-	-	2%
Gallup	Jul. 6-19, 1987	25%	5%	13%	5%	5%	6%	3%	-	1%	-	-	-	-	-	-	-	-	-	-	-	-	-	5%
NYT-CBS News	Jul 21-22, 1987	-	8%	14%	7%	3%	6%	4%	5%	3%	-	-	-	-	-	-	-	-	-	-	-	-	-	-
Gallup	Aug. 24 - Sep. 2, 1987	-	13%	19%	8%	6%	7%	3%	6%	2%	-	-	-	-	-	-	-	-	-	-	-	-	-	2%
Gallup; Times Mirror Co.	Sep. 1-13, 1987	-	15%	24%	6%	7%	7%	4%	3%	1%	-	-	-	-	-	-	-	-	-	-	-	-	-	3%
WaPo-ABC News	Sep. 17-23, 1987	-	12%	23%	7%	8%	5%	6%	-	4%	-	-	-	-	-	-	-	-	-	-	-	-	-	-
Gallup	Oct. 23-26, 1987	-	14%	22%	7%	5%	8%	-	-	1%	-	-	-	-	-	-	-	-	-	-	-	-	-	*%
December 12: Gary Hart reenters race
WaPo-ABC News	Dec. 13-15, 1987	30%	15%	20%	5%	2%	8%	-	-	2%	-	-	-	-	-	-	-	-	-	-	-	-	-	-
NYT-CBS News	Dec. 15, 1987	21%	9%	17%	5%	1%	4%	-	-	2%	-	-	-	-	-	-	-	-	-	-	-	-	-	3%
NYT-CBS News	Dec. 15, 1987	-	11%	22%	5%	3%	5%	-	-	4%	-	-	-	-	-	-	-	-	-	-	-	-	-	3%
Gallup; News Tribune	Dec. 7-28, 1987	31%	10%	13%	5%	2%	10%	-	-	3%	-	-	-	-	-	-	-	-	-	-	-	-	-	-
WaPo-ABC News	Jan. 17–23, 1988	23%	11%	25%	6%	4%	12%	-	-	3%	-	-	-	-	-	-	-	-	-	-	-	-	-	-
Gallup	Jan. 22-24, 1988	23%	16%	15%	6%	9%	9%	-	-	4%	-	-	-	-	-	-	-	-	-	-	-	-	-	-
February 8: Iowa caucus
February 16: New Hampshire primary
March 8: Super Tuesday
Gallup	Mar. 10-12, 1988	-	32%	23%	17%	10%	5%	-	-	-	-	-	-	-	-	-	-	-	-	-	-	-	-	-

== Results ==
In the Iowa caucuses, Gephardt finished first, Simon finished second, and Dukakis finished third. In the New Hampshire primary, Dukakis finished first, Gephardt finished second, and Simon finished third. Dukakis and Gore campaigned hard against Gephardt with negative ads, and eventually the United Auto Workers retracted their endorsement of Gephardt, who was heavily dependent on labor union backing.

In the Super Tuesday races, Dukakis won six primaries, Gore five, Jackson five and Gephardt one, with Gore and Jackson splitting the southern states. The next week, Simon won Illinois. 1988 is tied with 1992 as the race with the most candidates winning primaries since the McGovern reforms of 1971. Gore's effort to paint Dukakis as too liberal for the general election proved unsuccessful, and he eventually withdrew. Jackson focused more on getting enough delegates to make sure African-American interests were represented in the platform than on winning outright. Dukakis eventually emerged as the party's nominee.

Tablemaker's note: (Note: This should not be taken as a finalized list of results, as more than a few of the sources used did not report finalized or official results for the primaries or caucuses. Additionally, superdelegates are not accounted for in the table, as they were not bound to a candidate the way pledged delegates were.)

Date	Pledged delegates	Contest	Delegates won and popular vote									
Date	Pledged delegates	Contest	Michael Dukakis	Jesse Jackson	Al Gore	Paul Simon	Dick Gephardt	Gary Hart	Bruce Babbitt	Uncommitted	Others	Total
February 8	0 (of 52)	Iowa caucuses (Note: In terms of the candidate preference vote, the News Election Service was only able to collect about (70%) of the precincts reporting. NES claimed that the Iowa Democratic Party was actively discouraging participation in the preference count. The party, for its part, preferred the media report on the "state delegate equivalents", or SDEs.)	670 SDEs (Note: State delegate equivalents (SDEs) are used to calculate how many delegates each candidate gets both in each district and on state level.) (22.36%); 18,041 (20.56%)	264 SDEs (8.81%); 9,773 (11.14%)	0 SDEs (0.00%); 192 (0.22%)	799 SDEs (26.67%); 21,403 (24.39%)	935 SDEs (31.21%); 24,136 (27.51%)	6 SDEs (0.20%); 896 (1.02%)	184 SDEs (6.14%); 8,049 (9.17%)	138 SDEs (4.61%); 5,251 (5.98%)	—	2,996 SDEs; 87,741
February 16	18 (of 18)	New Hampshire primary	9 del. 44,112 (35.89%)	9,615 (7.82%)	8,373 (6.83%)	3 del. 21,094 (17.16%)	6 del. 24,428 (19.94%)	4,888 (3.98%)	5,644 (4.59%)	—	4,647 (Note: Includes 1,349 votes at (1.10%) for William J. DuPont, 264 votes at (0.21%) for David Duke, 188 votes at (0.15%) for Lyndon LaRouche, 142 votes at (0.12%) for William A. Marra, 122 votes at (0.10%) for Conrad W. Roy, 84 votes at (0.07%) for Florenzo Di Donato, 61 votes at (0.05%) for Anthony R. Martin-Trigona, 47 votes at (0.04%) for Stephen A. Koczak, 36 votes at (0.03%) for William King, 33 votes at (0.03%) for Edward T. O'Donnell, 33 votes at (0.03%) for Cyril E. Sagan, 28 votes at (0.02%) for Frank L. Thomas, 25 votes at (0.02%) for Claude Kirk, 22 votes at (0.02%) for Irwin Zucker, 18 votes at (0.01%) for Norbert G. Dernell, 16 votes at (0.01%) for Osie Thorpe, 10 votes at (0.01%) for A.A. Van Petten, and 9 votes at (0.01%) for Stanley Locke. Write-in votes for Republican candidates included 724 votes at (0.59%) for George Bush, 591 votes at (0.48%) for Bob Dole, 439 votes at (0.36%) for Pat Robertson, 233 votes at (0.19%) for Jack Kemp, 164 votes at (0.13%) for Pete du Pont, 7 votes at (0.01%) for Alexander M. Haig, 1 vote at (<0.01%) for William Horrigan J., and 1 vote at (<0.00%) for Harold Stassen.) (3.78%)	122,913
February 23	0 (of 68)	Minnesota caucuses (Note: Official figures were released on March 8 by the state party, but only included percentages and not actual preference numbers, unlike earlier sources. The difference in recorded votes between sources was (28,016) to (48,915). The latter percentages are displayed below as recorded in italics.)	9,386 (33.50%) (~30%) (Note: Official figures as released by the state party; rounded percentages only.)	5,596 (19.97%) (~23%)	278 (0.99%) (~1%)	4,995 (17.83%) (~18%)	2,005 (7.16%) (~6%)	184 (0.66%) (~0.8%)	59 (0.21%) (~0.5%)	5,132 (18.32%) (~15%)	381 (1.36%)	26,551
February 23	15 (of 15)	South Dakota primary	6 del. 22,367 (31.21%)	3,866 (5.39%)	5,990 (8.36%)	3,991 (5.57%)	9 del. 31,226 (43.57%)	3,876 (5.41%)	345 (0.48%)	—	—	71,661
February 28	0 (of 23)	Maine caucuses (Note: Last found source only had (3,145) of the elected SDEs accounted for.)	1,327 SDEs (42.19%)	842 SDEs (26.77%)	48 SDEs (1.53%)	133 SDEs (4.23%)	97 SDEs (3.08%)	42 SDEs (1.34%)	—	648 SDEs (20.60%)	8 SDEs (0.25%)	3,553 SDEs
March 1	0 (of 14)	Vermont primary	28,244 (56.61%)	13,030 (37.39%)	—	2,596 (5.20%)	3,968 (7.95%)	2,052 (4.11%)	—	—	—	49,890
March 5	0 (of 13)	Wyoming caucuses	77 SDEs (26.10%); 766 (25.81%)	38 SDEs (12.88%); 439 (14.79%)	79.5 SDEs (26.95%); 747 (25.17%)	10 SDEs (3.39%); 108 (3.64%)	68 SDEs (23.05%); 685 (23.08%)	1 SDEs (0.34%); 32 (1.08%)	—	21.5 SDEs (7.29%); 191 (6.44%)	—	295 SDEs; 2,968
March 8	56 (of 56)	Alabama primary	31,351 (7.72%)	28 del. 176,764 (43.54%)	28 del. 151,739 (37.39%)	3,063 (0.75%)	30,214 (7.44%)	7,530 (1.85%)	2,410 (0.59%)	2,072 (0.51%)	845 (Note: All votes are for Lyndon LaRouche.) (0.21%)	405,988
March 8	3 (of 3)	American Samoa terr. caucus	1 del. 1 (33.33%)	—	—	—	1 del. 1 (33.33%)	—	—	1 del. 1 (33.33%)	—	3
March 8	38 (of 38)	Arkansas primary	10 del. 93,532 (18.85%)	9 del. 85,047 (17.14%)	19 del. 184,729 (37.24%)	8,908 (1.80%)	59,471 (11.99%)	18,598 (3.75%)	2,621 (0.53%)	35,376 (7.13%)	7,804 (Note: Includes 4,911 votes at (0.99%) for David Duke, 2,380 votes at (0.48%) for Lyndon LaRouche, and 513 votes at (0.10%) for Norbert G. Dernell.) (1.57%)	496,086
March 8	136 (of 136)	Florida primary	90 del. 509,204 (40.85%)	33 del. 250,496 (20.10%)	6 del. 158,789 (12.74%)	26,739 (2.15%)	7 del. 179,350 (14.39%)	35,329 (2.83%)	9,899 (0.79%)	76,682 (6.15%)	—	1,246,488
March 8	86 (of 86)	Georgia primary	14 del. 97,007 (15.61%)	38 del. 246,757 (39.72%)	33 del. 201,022 (32.35%)	8,458 (1.36%)	41,701 (6.71%)	15,844 (2.55%)	3,287 (0.53%)	7,227 (1.16%)	—	621,303
March 8	0 (of 20)	Hawaii caucuses (Note: Only 274 of 284 precincts had reported results in the source.)	2,716 (54.59%)	1,739 (34.95%)	58 (1.17%)	46 (0.92%)	98 (1.97%)	57 (1.15%)	—	259 (5.21%)	2 (Note: Both votes are for Lyndon LaRouche.) (0.04%)	4,975
March 8	0 (of 18)	Idaho caucuses	140 SDEs (37.53%); 1,516 (37.63%)	73 SDEs (19.57%); 882 (21.89%)	32 SDEs (8.58%); 333 (8.27%)	16 SDEs (4.29%); 280 (6.95%)	3 SDEs (0.80%); 44 (1.09%)	0 SDEs (0.00%); 1 (0.02%)	0 SDEs (0.00%); 1 (0.02%)	109 SDEs (29.22%); 972 (24.13%)	—	373 SDEs; 4,029
March 8	55 (of 55)	Kentucky primary	12 del. 59,433 (18.65%)	6 del. 49,667 (15.58%)	37 del. 145,988 (45.80%)	9,393 (2.95%)	28,982 (9.09%)	11,798 (3.70%)	1,290 (0.40%)	10,465 (3.28%)	1,705 (Note: Includes 681 votes at (0.21%) for Lyndon LaRouche, 537 votes at (0.17%) for Anthony R. Martin-Trigona, and 487 votes at (0.15%) for Richard Kay.) (0.53%)	318,721
March 8	63 (of 63)	Louisiana primary (Note: Only 3,264 of 3,272 precincts had reported results in the source.)	6 del. 95,315 (15.23%)	32 del. 220,305 (35.20%)	23 del. 174,106 (27.82%)	5,121 (0.82%)	2 del. 69,875 (11.16%)	26,669 (4.26%)	3,080 (0.49%)	—	31,468 (Note: Includes 23,415 votes at (3.74%) for David Duke, 3,740 votes at (0.60%) for Ahern, 1,746 votes at (0.28%) for Norbert G. Dernell, 1,686 votes at (0.27%) for Lyndon LaRouche, and 881 votes at (0.14%) for Richard Kay.) (5.03%)	625,939
March 8	67 (of 67)	Maryland primary	47 del. 236,681 (45.82%)	20 del. 149,837 (29.01%)	45,149 (8.74%)	14,188 (2.75%)	41,315 (8.00%)	9,460 (1.83%)	4,597 (0.89%)	13,368 (2.59%)	1,983 (Note: All votes are for Lyndon LaRouche.) (0.38%)	516,578
March 8	98 (of 98)	Massachusetts primary	79 del. 416,802 (58.58%)	19 del. 132,507 (18.62%)	31,991 (4.50%)	26,064 (3.66%)	72,678 (10.21%)	11,199 (1.57%)	4,939 (0.69%)	11,681 (1.64%)	3,670 (Note: Includes 2,225 votes at (0.31%) for Florenzo Di Donato, and 1,445 votes at (0.20%) for Lyndon LaRouche.) (0.52%)	711,531
March 8	40 (of 40)	Mississippi primary	1 del. 31,318 (8.76%)	24 del. 157,530 (44.06%)	15 del. 120,166 (33.61%)	2,123 (0.59%)	19,683 (5.51%)	13,790 (3.86%)	2,137 (0.60%)	9,474 (2.65%)	1,285 (0.36%)	357,506
March 8	77 (of 77)	Missouri primary	1 del. 61,557 (11.66%)	14 del. 106,287 (20.13%)	14,557 (2.76%)	21,424 (4.06%)	62 del. 305,123 (57.80%)	7,594 (1.44%)	1,405 (0.26%)	6,609 (1.25%)	3,327 (Note: Includes 1,766 votes at (0.33%) for David Duke, 692 votes at (0.13%) for Lyndon LaRouche, 394 votes at (0.07%) for Richard Kay, 264 votes at (0.05%) for Stephen A. Koczak, and 211 votes at (0.04%) for Norbert G. Dernell.) (0.63%)	527,883
March 8	0 (of 16)	Nevada caucuses	548 SDEs (26.07%)	460 SDEs (21.88%)	693 SDEs (32.97%)	23 SDEs (1.09%)	39 SDEs (1.86%)	10 SDEs (0.48%)	—	329 SDEs (15.65%)	—	2,102 SDEs
March 8	82 (of 82)	North Carolina primary	17 del. 137,755 (20.30%)	31 del. 223,207 (32.90%)	34 del. 235,345 (34.69%)	8,072 (1.19%)	37,483 (5.52%)	16,450 (2.42%)	3,921 (0.57%)	16,247 (2.39%)	—	678,480
March 8	46 (of 46)	Oklahoma primary	7 del. 66,229 (16.87%)	3 del. 52,431 (13.36%)	23 del. 162,513 (41.40%)	6,894 (1.76%)	13 del. 82,556 (21.03%)	14,328 (3.65%)	1,599 (0.41%)	-	6,021 (Note: Includes 2,402 votes at (0.61%) for David Duke, 1,080 votes at (0.28%) for Lyndon LaRouche, 1,064 votes at (0.27%) for Stephen A. Koczak, 1,000 votes at (0.25%) for Doty, and 475 votes at (0.12%) for Norbert G. Dernell.) (1.53%)	392,571
March 8	22 (of 22)	Rhode Island primary	19 del. 34,159 (69.96%)	3 del. 7,369 (15.09%)	1,932 (3.96%)	1,392 (2.85%)	2,013 (4.12%)	738 (1.51%)	402 (0.82%)	818 (1.67%)	-	48,823
March 8	70 (of 70)	Tennessee primary	19,268 (3.36%)	14 del. 118,615 (20.69%)	56 del. 414,569 (72.30%)	2,641 (0.46%)	8,657 (1.51%)	4,693 (0.82%)	1,982 (0.35%)	2,939 (0.51%)	-	573,364
March 8	119 (of 183)	Texas primary (Note: Only 6,829 of 6,933 precincts had reported results in the source.)	43 del. 553,006 (32.35%)	42 del. 418,057 (24.46%)	25 del. 349,505 (20.45%)	34,269 (2.00%)	9 del. 232,814 (13.62%)	79,235 (4.64%)	15,073 (0.88%)	-	27,518 (Note: Includes 9,054 votes at (0.53%) for Lyndon LaRouche, 8,683 votes at (0.51%) for David Duke, 6,215 votes at (0.36%) for W.A. Williams, and 3566 votes at (0.21%) for Norbert G. Dernell.) (1.53%)	1,709,477
March 8	75 (of 75)	Virginia primary (Note: Only 1,982 of 1,986 precincts had reported results in the source.)	15 del. 78,637 (21.79%)	38 del. 162,545 (45.03%)	22 del. 81,064 (22.46%)	6,921 (1.92%)	16,179 (4.48%)	6,241 (1.73%)	2,465 (0.68%)	6,086 (1.69%)	796 (Note: All votes are for Lyndon LaRouche.) (0.22%)	360,934
March 8	0 (of 13)	Washington caucuses	5,906 SDEs (43.61%)	4,562 SDEs (33.69%)	460 SDEs (3.40%)	526 SDEs (3.88%)	175 SDEs (1.29%)	16 SDEs (0.12%)	—	1,898 SDEs (14.01%)	—	13,543 SDEs
March 10	0 (of 17)	Alaska caucuses (Note: Source only had ~90% of 442 precincts reporting.)	769 SDEs (30.78%)	872 SDEs (34.91%)	47 SDEs (1.88%)	18 SDEs (0.72%)	16 SDEs (0.64%)	8 SDEs (0.32%)	—	768 SDEs (30.74%)	—	2,498 SDEs
March 12	0 (of 47)	South Carolina caucuses (Note: Source only had 1,636 of 1,788 precincts reporting.)	961 SDEs (6.64%)	7,821 SDEs (54.04%)	2,577 SDEs (17.81%)	39 SDEs (0.27%)	296 SDEs (2.05%)	5 SDEs (0.03%)	—	2,773 SDEs (19.16%)	—	14,472 SDEs
March 15	0 (of 187)	Illinois preference primary	245,289 (16.34%)	484,233 (32.26%)	77,265 (5.15%)	635,219 (42.32%)	35,108 (2.34%)	—	—	—	23,816 (Note: No breakdown was provided in the source.) (9.07%)	1,500,930
March 15	113 (of 187)	Illinois delegate primary	—	24 del.	—	89 del.	—	—	—	—	—	—
March 19	0 (of 183)	Texas caucuses (Note: Only 5,037 of 5,288 elected SDEs were accounted for by the source.)	1,666 SDEs (33.08%)	1,722 SDEs (34.19%)	915 SDEs (18.17%)	—	156 SDEs (3.10%)	—	—	553 SDEs (10.98%)	25 SDEs (Note: No breakdown was provided, though the source states it includes state delegates for Paul Simon and Gary Hart.) (0.50%)	2,498 SDEs
March 20	0 (of 39)	Kansas caucuses	278 SDEs (36.39%)	235 SDEs (30.76%)	125 SDEs (16.36%)	—	12 SDEs (1.57%)	—	—	114 SDEs (14.92%)	—	764 SDEs
March 20	0 (of 51)	Puerto Rico pref. primary (Note: The latest source with a breakdown of the vote only had 31% of precincts reporting; another source, with 91% of precincts reporting, had no breakdown of individual votes. The latter are displayed below in italics.)	17,023 (23.07%) (~26%) (Note: Updated figures with 91% of precincts reporting in; rounded percentages only.)	25,971 (35.20%) (~32%)	13,210 (17.90%) (~17%)	14,870 (20.15%) (~21%)	2,707 (3.67%) (~3%)	—	—	—	—	73,781
March 20	51 (of 51)	Puerto Rico delegate primary	—	—	—	—	—	—	—	51 del.	—	—
March 22	9 (of 9)	Democrats Abroad primary	0.5 del. 990 (48.06%)	347 (16.84%)	—	248 (12.04%)	—	—	—	8.5 del.	475 (Note: Includes 304 votes at (14.76%) for Andy Sundberg, and 171 votes at (8.30%) for Mario Cuomo.) (23.06%)	2,060
March 26	0 (of 138)	Michigan caucuses	61,568 (29.08%)	113,140 (53.44%)	4,296 (2.03%)	4,456 (2.10%)	27,125 (12.81%)	349 (0.16%)	—	429 (0.20%)	342 (Note: Write-ins; no breakdown.) (0.16%)	211,705
March 26	0 (of 15)	North Dakota caucuses	692 (27.71%)	479 (19.18%)	136 (5.45%)	150 (6.01%)	442 (17.70%)	26 (1.04%)	12 (0.48%)	529 (21.19%)	31 (Note: Includes 26 votes at (1.04%) for Mario Cuomo, 3 votes at (0.12%) for Lyndon LaRouche, 1 vote at (0.04%) for Lee Iacocca, and 1 vote at (0.04%) for Sam Nunn.) (1.24%)	2,497
March 29	59 (of 59)	Connecticut primary	35 del. 139,434 (60.77%)	17 del. 68,283 (29.76%)	18,598 (8.11%)	3,115 (1.36%)	—	—	—	—	—	229,430
April 2	3 (of 3)	Virgin Is. terr. caucuses	37 (5.51%)	3 del. 634 (94.49%)	—	—	—	—	—	—	—	671
April 4	0 (of 49)	Colorado caucuses (Note: Last found source only had ~73% of precincts reporting in.)	3,974 SDEs (~45.4%)	3,453 SDEs (~39.5%)	236 SDEs (~2.7%)	—	—	—	—	1,069 SDEs (~12.2%)	—	? SDEs
April 5	81 (of 81)	Wisconsin primary	44 del. 483,172 (47.61%)	24 del. 285,995 (28.18%)	13 del. 176,712 (17.41%)	48,419 (4.77%)	7,996 (0.79%)	7,068 (0.70%)	2,353 (0.23%)	2,554 (0.25%)	513 (Note: No breakdown was provided in the source.) (0.05%)	1,014,782
April 16	0 (of 36)	Arizona caucuses	20,814 (54.11%)	14,538 (37.80%)	1,972 (5.13%)	465 (1.21%)	—	—	—	639 (1.66%)	35 (Note: All votes are for Lyndon LaRouche.) (0.09%)	38,463
April 16	15 (of 15)	North Dakota state convention	3 del.	2 del.	—	—	—	—	—	10 del.	—	—
April 16	47 (of 47)	South Carolina state convention	7 del.	28 del. 634 (94.49%)	12 del.	—	—	—	—	—	—	—
April 18	0 (of 15)	Delaware caucuses	51.5 SDEs (27.25%)	86.5 SDEs (45.77%)	4 SDEs (2.12%)	—	—	—	—	47 SDEs (24.87%)	—	189 SDEs
April 19	255 (of 255)	New York primary	164 del. 801,457 (50.87%)	89 del. 585,272 (37.15%)	2 del. 157,559 (10.00%)	17,020 (1.08%)	2,608 (0.17%)	—	—	10,323 (0.66%)	1,152 (Note: All votes are for Lyndon LaRouche.) (0.07%)	1,575,391
April 19	0 (of 14)	Vermont caucuses	582 SDEs (44.63%)	596 SDEs (45.71%)	6 SDEs (0.46%)	—	—	—	—	120 SDEs (9.20%)	—	1,304 SDEs
April 23	6 (of 49)	Colorado; CD conventions (Note: Not all district conventions in Colorado were held on the same day; on this date, only the 1st District held a convention.)	2 del.	4 del.	—	—	—	—	—	—	—	—
April 23	26 (of 39)	Kansas; CD conventions	12 del.	7 del.	5 del.	—	—	—	—	2 del.	—	—
April 24	3 (of 3)	Guam terr. committee	—	—	—	—	—	—	—	3 del.	—	—
April 25	0 (of 23)	Utah caucuses (Note: Only ~90% of legislative districts had reported in by the time of the source. Only votes for Dukakis, Jackson and "Uncommitted" were accounted for.)	7,205 (~70%)	1,711 (~17%)	—	—	—	—	—	1,211 (~12%)	—	?
April 26	0 (of 96)	Pennsylvania pref. primary	1,002,480 (66.49%)	411,260 (27.28%)	44,542 (2.95%)	9,692 (0.64%)	7,254 (0.48%)	20,473 (1.36%)	—	—	11,989 (Note: Includes 7,546 votes at (0.50%) for Jennifer Alden Wesner, and 4,443 votes at (0.29%) for Lyndon LaRouche.) (0.80%)	1,507,690
April 26	116 (of 178)	Pennsylvania delegate primary	102 del.	14 del.	—	—	—	—	—	—	—	—
April 30	43 (of 78)	Minnesota; CD conventions (Note: Not all district conventions in Minnesota were held on the same day; on this date, all districts held a convention other than the 8th.)	19 del.	14 del.	—	2 del.	—	—	—	8 del.	—	—
May 3	79 (of 79)	Indiana primary	63 del. 449,495 (69.61%)	16 del. 145,021 (22.46%)	21,865 (3.39%)	12,550 (1.94%)	16,777 (2.60%)	—	—	—	—	645,708
May 3	159 (of 159)	Ohio primary (Note: Only 96% of the precincts had reported in by the time the source was published; later sources did not provide a breakdown of the vote beyond Dukakis and Jackson.)	115 del. 839,103 (63.00%)	41 del. 362,720 (27.23%)	29,313 (2.20%)	15,076 (1.13%)	—	1 del. 23,915 (1.80%)	—	—	2 del. (Note: James Traficanct and Douglas Applegate each won a delegate.); 61,699 (Note: Includes 29,980 votes at (2.25%) for James Traficanct, 25,510 votes at (1.92%) for Douglas Applegate, and 6,209 votes at (0.47%) for Lyndon LaRouche.) (4.63%)	794,904
May 3	16 (of 16)	Washington, D.C. primary	3 del. 14,969 (17.71%)	13 del. 67,812 (80.24%)	612 (0.72%)	750 (0.89%)	—	—	—	—	371 (Note: Breakdown was not provided by source.) (0.44%)	84,514
May 7	60 (of 187)	Illinois state committee	—	13 del.	—	47 del.	—	—	—	—	—	—
May 7	8 (of 78)	Minnesota; CD conventions (Note: Not all district conventions in Minnesota were held on the same day; on this date, the only district that held a convention was the 8th.)	3 del.	3 del.	—	—	—	—	—	2 del.	—	—
May 7	16 (of 16)	Nevada state convention	7 del.	4 del.	5 del.	—	—	—	—	—	—	—
May 7	13 (of 13)	Wyoming state convention	6 del.	3 del.	4 del.	—	—	—	—	—	—	—
May 10	25 (of 25)	Nebraska primary (Note: Only 1,831 of 1,870 precincts had reported in by the time the source was published.)	18 del. 103,552 (62.44%)	7 del. 43,890 (26.46%)	2,463 (1.49%)	2,079 (1.25%)	4,809 (2.90%)	4,087 (2.46%)	—	4,544 (2.74%)	424 (Note: All votes are for Lyndon LaRouche.) (0.26%)	165,848
May 10	37 (of 37)	West Virginia primary	37 del. 254,289 (74.77%)	45,788 (13.46%)	—	—	—	—	—	—	40,020 (Note: Breakdown was not provided by source.) (11.77%)	340,097
May 14	9 (of 49)	Colorado; CD conventions (Note: Not all district conventions in Colorado were held on the same day; on this date, the 5th and 6th districts held conventions.)	7 del.	2 del.	—	—	—	—	—	—	—	—
May 14	34 (of 52)	Iowa; CD conventions	12 del.	7 del.	—	6 del.	8 del.	—	—	1 del.	—	—
May 14	13 (of 39)	Kansas state convention	7 del.	3 del.	3 del.	—	—	—	—	—	—	—
May 14	138 (of 138)	Michigan state committee	55 del.	74 del.	—	—	9 del.	—	—	—	—	—
May 15	17 (of 17)	Alaska state convention	7 del.	7 del.	—	—	—	—	—	3 del.	—	—
May 15	23 (of 23)	Maine state convention	11 del.	9 del.	—	—	—	—	—	3 del.	—	—
May 17	45 (of 45)	Oregon primary	27 del. 208,795 (55.46%)	18 del. 143,593 (38.14%)	7,211 (1.92%)	4,918 (1.31%)	9,123 (2.42%)	—	—	—	2,817 (Note: All votes are for Lyndon LaRouche.) (0.75%)	376,457
May 20	14 (of 49)	Colorado; CD conventions (Note: Not all district conventions in Colorado were held on the same day; on this date, the 2nd, 3rd and 4th districts held conventions.)	10 del.	4 del.	—	—	—	—	—	—	—	—
May 21	20 (of 49)	Colorado state convention	14 del.	6 del.	—	—	—	—	—	—	—	—
May 21	14 (of 14)	Vermont state convention	6 del.	7 del.	—	—	—	—	—	1 del.	—	—
May 23	15 (of 15)	Delaware state convention	4 del.	7 del.	—	—	—	—	—	4 del.	—	—
May 24	0 (of 18)	Idaho primary	37,576 (73.33%)	8,020 (15.65%)	1,903 (3.71%)	1,456 (2.84%)	—	—	—	2,287 (4.46%)	—	51,242
May 28	23 (of 36)	Arizona reg. caucuses	14 del.	9 del.	—	—	—	—	—	—	—	—
May 28	20 (of 20)	Hawaii state convention	12 del.	8 del.	—	—	—	—	—	—	—	—
June 4	13 (of 36)	Arizona state convention	9 del.	5 del.	—	—	—	—	—	—	—	—
June 4	62 (of 178)	Pennsylvania state committee	62 del.	—	—	—	—	—	—	—	—	—
June 4	43 (of 65)	Washington; CD conventions	25 del.	18 del.	—	—	—	—	—	—	—	—
June 7	314 (of 314)	California primary (Note: Only ~99% precincts had reported in by the time the source was published.)	198 del. 1,778,436 (59.89%)	116 del. 1,050,750 (35.38%)	53,227 (1.79%)	63,307 (2.13%)	—	—	—	—	23,884 (Note: All votes are for Lyndon LaRouche.) (0.80%)	2,969,604
June 7	19 (of 19)	Montana primary	15 del. 83,017 (68.64%)	4 del. 26,774 (22.14%)	2,196 (1.82%)	1,598 (1.32%)	3,446 (2.85%)	—	—	3,912 (3.23%)	—	120,943
June 7	109 (of 109)	New Jersey primary	100 del. 401,547 (64.66%)	9 del. 193,791 (31.21%)	17,649 (2.84%)	—	—	—	—	—	7,978 (Note: Includes 2,796 votes at (0.45%) for William A. Marra, 2,726 votes at (0.44%) for Lyndon LaRouche, and 2,456 votes at (0.40%) for David Duke.) (1.28%)	620,965
June 7	24 (of 24)	New Mexico primary	16 del. 114,968 (60.96%)	8 del. 52,988 (28.09%)	4,747 (2.52%)	2,821 (1.50%)	—	6,898 (3.66%)	2,913 (1.54%)	3,275 (1.74%)	—	188,610
June 11	17 (of 78)	Minnesota state convention	17 del.	10 del.	—	—	—	—	—	—	—	—
June 11	22 (of 65)	Washington state convention	13 del.	9 del.	—	—	—	—	—	—	—	—
June 18	18 (of 18)	Idaho state convention	9 del.	3 del.	—	—	—	—	—	6 del.	—	—
June 18	64 (of 183)	Texas state convention	29 del.	25 del.	10 del.	—	—	—	—	—	—	—
June 25	18 (of 52)	Iowa state convention	10 del.	5 del.	—	—	—	—	—	3 del.	—	—
June 25	23 (of 23)	Utah state convention	20 del.	3 del.	—	—	—	—	—	—	—	—
Totals			1,726.5 del. 9,705,590 (42.17%)	1,056 del. 6,732,778 (29.26%)	375 del. 3,124,278 (13.58%)	147 del. 1,078,112 (4.68%)	126 del. 1,432,080 (6.22%)	1 del. 354,298 (1.54%)	0 del. 80,483 (0.35%)	106.5 del. 238,420 (1.04%)	2 del. 267,110 (1.16%)	3,540 del. 23,013,149 (Note: In the case of a state which held multiple contests, the higher raw vote total is used.)

== Democratic convention ==
The Democratic Party Convention was held in Atlanta, Georgia, on July 18–21. The Dukakis nominating speech delivered by Arkansas governor and future president Bill Clinton was widely criticized as too long and tedious.

Texas State Treasurer Ann Richards (who two years later became the state governor in 1990) delivered a memorable keynote address in which she uttered the lines "Poor George [Bush], he can't help it, he was born with a silver foot in his mouth." Six years later, Bush's son George W. Bush would deny Richards re-election as Texas governor in 1994.

With most candidates having withdrawn and asking their delegates to vote for Dukakis, the tally for president was as follows:

- Michael Dukakis - 2,877 (70.09%)
- Jesse Jackson - 1,219 (29.70%)
- Richard Stallings - 3 (0.07%)
- Joe Biden - 2 (0.05%)
- Dick Gephardt - 2 (0.05%)
- Lloyd Bentsen - 1 (0.02%)
- Gary Hart - 1 (0.02%)

Jesse Jackson's campaign believed that since they had come in a respectable second, Jackson was entitled to the vice presidential spot. Dukakis refused, and gave the spot to Lloyd Bentsen.

Bentsen was selected in large part to secure the state of Texas and its large electoral vote for the Democrats. During the vice-presidential debate, Republican candidate and Senator Dan Quayle ignored a head-on confrontation with Bentsen (aside from the "Jack Kennedy" comparison) and spent his time attacking Dukakis.

== See also ==
- 1988 Republican Party presidential primaries
