= Monkey Business (yacht) =

Yacht involved in a 1988 political scandal

Monkey Business is an American yacht built for the use of the Turnberry Isle Resort Marina in southern Florida. It is best known for its role in scuttling the 1988 campaign of Gary Hart for President of the United States.

== History ==
An 83-foot (25 m) Broward Marine motor yacht, Monkey Business was custom built for the Turnberry Isle Resort. The hull was made from aluminum; cabins had rosewood paneling and amenities included a hot tub and full bar. Guests hosted aboard included Elton John, Elizabeth Taylor, Jack Nicholson, and Julio Iglesias.

=== Gary Hart incident ===
In March 1987, at which time it was owned by developers Donald Soffer and Eddie Lewis, the yacht was rented by William C. Broadhurst, a Louisiana lawyer and lobbyist. Together with former US senator Gary Hart, Broadhurst sailed it to Bimini for an overnight trip with two women, one of whom was Donna Rice. After Hart became a candidate for the Democratic nomination in the 1988 election for President of the United States, the issue of whether he was having an affair with Rice was raised in the press.

As rumors began circulating about the supposed extramarital affairs, Hart challenged the media. He told The New York Times in an interview published on May 3, 1987, "They should follow me around... They'll be very bored." As the NBC anchor John Chancellor explained a few days later, "We did. We weren't." On May 8, 1987, five days after issuing his challenge, the Colorado senator withdrew as a candidate after the cruise on Monkey Business became known.

On Sunday, May 3, The Miami Herald published a major story with the headline, "Miami Woman Is Linked to Hart". A few weeks later, a picture appeared in the National Enquirer, and then in hundreds of newspapers worldwide, showing Donna Rice sitting in Hart's lap with Hart in a Monkey Business T-shirt.

In 2018, Democratic media consultant Raymond Strother made public a conversation he had with Republican operative Lee Atwater in the final weeks of Atwater's life in which he told Strother that the photograph of Hart and Rice had been arranged by Atwater to discredit Hart.

== In popular culture ==
Prior to the 1987 political scandal, the yacht made an appearance in the 1983 film Smokey and the Bandit Part 3. The yacht also appeared in the 2018 film about the scandal, The Front Runner.
