= Donna Rice Hughes =

American activist (born 1958)

- Born: January 7, 1958 (age 68); Delacroix, Louisiana, U.S.
- Education: University of South Carolina (BS)
- Employer: Enough Is Enough
- Spouse: Jack Hughes (m. 1994)
- Website: donnaricehughes.net

Donna Rice Hughes (born January 7, 1958) is an American activist, author, speaker, and film producer who is president and chairperson of Enough Is Enough, an anti-pornography non-profit organization. In her work with Enough is Enough, Hughes has appeared on a variety of outlets as an Internet safety advocate. She first became known as a key figure in a widely publicized 1987 political scandal that contributed to the end of the second campaign of former Senator Gary Hart for the Democratic Party nomination for president.

== Early life ==
Rice grew up in the Irmo area near Columbia, South Carolina. She attended the University of South Carolina, where she was a cheerleader and a member of the Phi Beta Kappa honor society. She graduated with a Bachelors of Science degree in biology.

After graduating from college, Rice won the Miss South Carolina World beauty pageant. She went to New York to compete nationally. Rice later moved to Miami, where she worked as a marketing representative for pharmaceutical giant Wyeth Laboratories in South Florida. She also briefly worked as an actress, appearing in TV commercials, a 1986 episode of the TV series Miami Vice, an uncredited extra in an episode of the soap opera One Life to Live, and one scene – cut because of her poor performance – in the movie Last Plane Out.

== 1987 political scandal ==
Rice met former Senator Gary Hart at a 1986–87 New Year's Eve Party at the Aspen, Colorado, home of her then boyfriend, rocker Don Henley. She later met Hart in Miami, and said she was "very interested in getting into fund-raising". Soon after meeting Rice, Hart announced that he would run for the Democratic nomination for president. Having enjoyed a surprisingly strong campaign in 1984 against the eventual nominee, former vice president Walter Mondale, he was widely perceived as a front-runner for the Democratic nomination in 1988. Shortly thereafter, rumors began circulating that he was a "womanizer", leading Hart to invite the media to observe his public behavior and to claim that anybody who did so would "be very bored."

In a controversial move, Miami Herald reporters followed Rice on a flight from Miami to Washington, D.C., then staked out Hart's townhouse following a phone call from someone trying to sell pictures from the trip. There, the Herald's Jim McGee saw Hart and Rice return to Hart's townhouse. The Herald reported that Rice had spent the night at Hart's residence, but later conceded that it had not watched the back door, through which she could have left.

Their story was published on the same day that his quotation appeared in The New York Times Magazine. The ensuing report sent the media into frenzy. Hart said that the reporters could not know exactly when Rice arrived or why she was there, and Rice denied that she had slept at Hart's house or that the relationship was sexual. Hart also denied the story's accuracy.

Hart's popular appeal suffered, and polls taken almost immediately afterward found him 10 points behind Massachusetts Governor Michael Dukakis in New Hampshire. On May 8, 1987, a week after the story broke, Hart suspended his campaign after the Washington Post threatened to run a story about a woman Hart had dated while separated from his wife, and his wife and daughter became similar subjects of interest for tabloid newspapers.

=== Monkey Business photo ===
On the cover of its June 2, 1987 edition, the celebrity tabloid National Enquirer published a photograph of Rice sitting on Hart's lap. The pair were pictured on a dock during a yacht trip to Bimini that Hart, Rice, and others took before he announced his presidential campaign. Hart is wearing a T-shirt bearing the words Monkey Business, the yacht's name. The photo was published alongside the headline "Gary Hart Asked Me to Marry Him". It was published weeks after Hart suspended his campaign, but has been subsequently collectively mistaken for the reason for Hart's exit. There are allegations that Republican operative Lee Atwater set the photo up to discredit Hart.

Rice and Hart have consistently denied that their relationship was sexual and said they were just friends.

The scandal is depicted in the 2018 film The Front Runner, with Rice played by Sara Paxton.

=== Aftermath ===
The enormous publicity generated by the Hart scandal resulted in numerous lucrative offers, and while Rice refused most – including one for an interview with Playboy magazine, an ABC movie of the week, book and magazine offers – she did appear in 1987 as the No Excuses jeans girl in commercials and advertisements for No Excuses jeans. She said, "A month after the scandal broke, I tried to go back to work at the pharmaceutical company after a leave of absence. But because of all the publicity and resulting pressure and stress, I finally resigned." A month after the scandal broke, she began reconnecting with her Christian faith and then disappeared from the public eye for seven years. Rice lived in Los Angeles briefly, then moved to the Washington, D.C. suburbs in Northern Virginia in the early 1990s. There she married Jack Hughes, a businessman, in May 1994.

== Advocacy ==
Since 1994, when she became communications director and spokesperson for Enough Is Enough, an American secular nonpartisan nonprofit organization whose mission is to make the Internet safer for families and children, Hughes has been an advocate and speaker on the issue of protecting children online. She became president and CEO of the organization in 2002. The organization has produced an Internet Safety 101SM program with the Department of Justice and other partners. She is the executive producer, host and instructor of the Internet Safety 101 DVD series, which ran as a TV series on PBS, garnering Hughes an Emmy nomination in 2012 and the series an Emmy Award in 2013.

Hughes has testified before multiple congressional hearings on protecting children online. She and Enough Is Enough supported the Communications Decency Act (CDA) of 1996, the Children's Internet Protection Act (CIPA), and the Child Online Protection Act (COPA). Senator Trent Lott appointed Hughes to serve on the COPA Commission, and she co-chaired the COPA Hearings on filtering/ratings/labeling technologies. She also serves on various Internet safety advisory boards and task forces, including the 2006 Virginia Attorney General's Youth Internet Safety Task Force and the 2008 Internet Safety Technical Task Force, formed with MySpace and the U.S. Attorneys General. Beyond addressing the dangers of Internet pornography, Hughes has also spoken into the issue of privacy online, teen suicide and the impact of cyberbullying. She has received numerous awards, including the National Law Center for Children and Families Annual Appreciation Award, and the "Protector of Children Award" and Media Impact Award from the National Abstinence Clearinghouse. In 2013, Hughes received the Women in Technology Leadership Award for "Social Impact".

In 2014, Enough is Enough's "National Porn Free Wi-Fi" campaign" encouraged McDonald's and Starbucks to add filters to block pornography on their Wi-Fi networks. In 2016, McDonald's implemented a filtered Wi-Fi policy in most of its 14,000 stores. Starbucks followed suit and announced it would implement a global policy as well. That same year, Hughes won the 2014 Professional Women in Advocacy Excellence In Advocacy Award for "Veteran Practitioner".

Enough Is Enough sponsored a "Children's Internet Safety Presidential Pledge" in 2016, asking presidential candidates to pledge to combat both Internet pornography—including both illegal child pornography and legal adult pornography—if elected president. The Pledge states that if elected president, the pledging person will "uphold the rule of law by aggressively enforcing existing federal laws to prevent the sexual exploitation of children online, including the federal obscenity laws, child pornography laws, sexual predation laws and the sex trafficking laws." Republican U.S. presidential candidate Donald Trump signed the pledge, and Democratic U.S. presidential candidate Hillary Clinton sent a letter of support.

Hughes has publicly spoken against articles appearing in Teen Vogue magazine that promote sexual activity of any kind to teens, sparking an online petition her organization initiated called "Say No To Teen Vogue" after it published Anal Sex: What You Need to Know/How to Do it the Right Way. The petition received more than 29,000 signatures calling to "boycott Teen Vogue until this article is retracted and these types of articles cease to be published."

In October 2017, Hughes was one of 120 world leaders to participate in the "Child Dignity In the Digital World" World Congress in Rome to set the global agenda in the fight against child sexual abuse and exploitation in the digital age. The Congress concluded with a papal audience at the Vatican in which Pope Francis applauded the Congress in his address for concentrating with great foresight "on what is probably the most crucial challenge for the future of the human family, the protection of young people's dignity, their healthy development, their joy and their hope."

In November 2017, Hughes joined Candy Carson and others at the invitation of Homemakers for America for the grand opening of the Museum of the Bible in Washington D.C. to ring the replica of the Liberty Bell, launching a nationwide ringing of bells by churches to calling Americans to come together to "Let Freedom Ring!"

=== Writing ===
Hughes co-wrote the story for the May 2000 season finale episode of Touched by an Angel that dealt with online safety. She authored the book Kids Online: Protecting Your Children in Cyberspace and website ProtectKids.com. As a platform issue of Enough Is Enough, she has written and spoken regularly on the harms of online bullying, the relational brokenness of young people, and the need for a safer, kinder and ethical community on and offline.

Hughes was an outspoken supporter of Republican presidential candidate Donald Trump during his 2016 presidential campaign. She has also written numerous commentaries that have been published in the Los Angeles Times, USA Today, Politico, CNN, FOX News and other media outlets.

Hughes has called upon The Walt Disney Company to crack down on unauthorized "Disney porn" on the Internet.

== Personal life ==
Hughes is married to Jack Hughes and has two adult stepchildren and three grandchildren. She has said she was a victim of date rape "on the way to New York City by an older man who was involved with the pageant system, and lost my virginity at that time". She says the rape was "the turning point in my life, the catalyst that propelled me further into an unhealthy lifestyle".
