= 1988 United States presidential election in Rhode Island =

- November 8, 1988
- Turnout: 70.2% ▼7.8 pp

Nominee	Michael Dukakis	George H. W. Bush
Party	Democratic	Republican
Home state	Massachusetts	Texas
Running mate	Lloyd Bentsen	Dan Quayle
Electoral vote	4	0
Popular vote	225,123	177,761
Percentage	55.64%	43.93%

Dukakis
40–50%
50–60%
60–70%
Bush
50–60%
60–70%
President before election
Ronald Reagan
Republican
Elected President
George H. W. Bush
Republican

The 1988 United States presidential election in Rhode Island took place on November 8, 1988, as part of the 1988 United States presidential election, which was held throughout all 50 states and D.C. Voters chose four representatives, or electors, to the Electoral College, who voted for president and vice president.

Rhode Island voted for the Democratic nominee, Massachusetts Governor Michael Dukakis, over Republican Vice President George H. W. Bush. Dukakis took 55.64% of the vote to Bush's 43.93%, a margin of 11.71%. This made it one of 10 states (plus the District of Columbia) to vote for Dukakis, while Bush won a convincing electoral victory nationwide.

A liberal New England state, Rhode Island gave Dukakis his strongest state victory in the nation, with only the District of Columbia voting more Democratic. It was one of just two states (along with Iowa) to vote Democratic by a double-digit margin, and one of only two states (along with Hawaii) to have all of its counties go to Dukakis. Despite this, it was still a relatively strong Republican performance compared to how the state has trended since. The state has voted Democratic in every presidential election that followed. This is the last time until the 2024 election that a Republican candidate won over 40% of the vote in Rhode Island.

To date, this is the last time that the towns of Barrington, Charlestown, Little Compton, Middletown, North Kingstown, and Portsmouth voted Republican.

== Results ==
1988 United States presidential election in Rhode Island
Party	Candidate	Votes	Percentage	Electoral votes
Democratic	Michael Dukakis	225,123	55.64%	4
Republican	George H. W. Bush	177,761	43.93%	0
Libertarian	Ron Paul	825	0.20%	0
New Alliance	Lenora Fulani	280	0.07%	0
Peace and Freedom	Herbert G. Lewin	195	0.05%	0
America First	David Duke	159	0.04%	0
Socialist Workers	James Warren	130	0.03%	0
Socialist	Willa Kenoyer	96	0.02%	0
Write-ins	Write-ins	51	0.01%	0
Totals		404,620	100.00%	4
Voter turnout (voting age/registered)				53%/74%

=== By county ===
County	Michael Dukakis Democratic		George H. W. Bush Republican		Various candidates Other parties		Margin		Total votes cast
County	#	%	#	%	#	%	#	%	Total votes cast
Bristol	11,168	51.04%	10,626	48.56%	89	0.40%	542	2.48%	21,883
Kent	37,221	51.84%	34,314	47.79%	266	0.37%	2,907	4.05%	71,801
Newport	17,597	50.76%	16,923	48.82%	144	0.42%	674	1.94%	34,664
Providence	135,927	58.80%	94,248	40.77%	984	0.43%	41,679	18.03%	231,159
Washington	23,210	51.51%	21,650	48.04%	202	0.45%	1,560	3.47%	45,062
Totals	225,123	55.64%	177,761	43.93%	1,736	0.43%	47,362	11.71%	404,620

==== Counties that flipped from Republican to Democratic ====
- Bristol
- Kent
- Newport
- Washington

== See also ==
- United States presidential elections in Rhode Island
- Presidency of George H. W. Bush
