= 1988 United States presidential election =

Election of George H. W. Bush

- November 8, 1988

538 members of the Electoral College 270 electoral votes needed to win
- Turnout: 52.8% (▼2.4 pp)

| Nominee | George H. W. Bush | Michael Dukakis |
| Party | Republican | Democratic |
| Home state | Texas | Massachusetts |
| Running mate | Dan Quayle | Lloyd Bentsen |
| Electoral vote | 426 | 111 (Note: A faithless Democratic elector from West Virginia voted for Bentsen for president and Dukakis for vice president. As a result, Dukakis had 111 electoral votes instead of the pledged 112.) |
| States carried | 40 | 10 + DC |
| Popular vote | 48,886,597 | 41,809,476 |
| Percentage | 53.4% | 45.6% |
- Presidential election results map. Red denotes states won by Bush/Quayle and blue denotes those won by Dukakis/Bentsen. Light blue represents the sole electoral vote for Bentsen/Dukakis by a West Virginia faithless elector. Numbers indicate electoral votes cast by each state and the District of Columbia.
President before election
Ronald Reagan
Republican
Elected President
George H. W. Bush
Republican

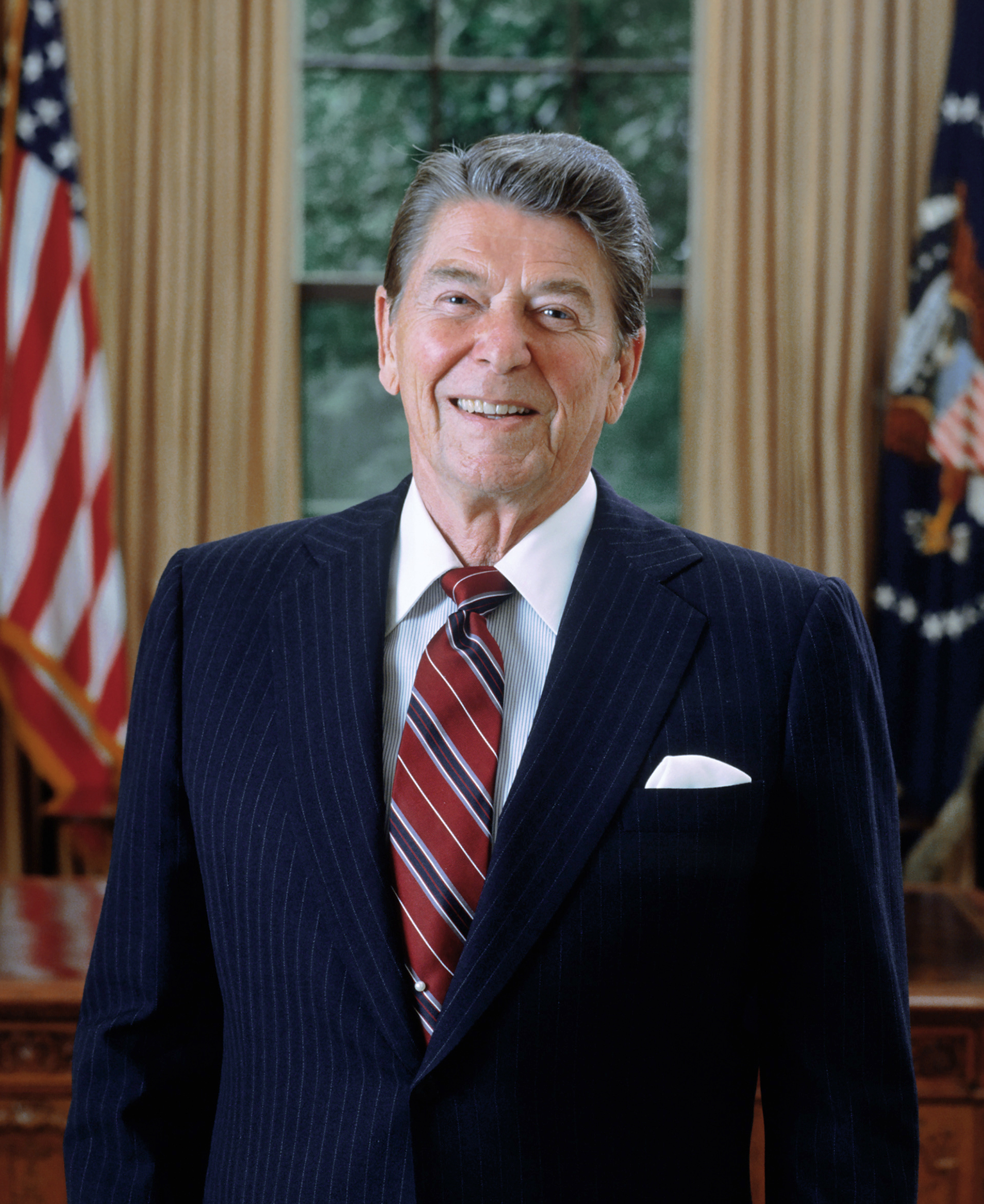
Ronald Reagan, the incumbent president in 1988, whose second term expired at noon on January 20, 1989

A presidential election was held in the United States on November 8, 1988. The Republican ticket of incumbent vice president George H. W. Bush and Indiana junior senator Dan Quayle defeated the Democratic ticket of Massachusetts governor Michael Dukakis and Texas senior senator Lloyd Bentsen. The election was the third consecutive landslide victory for the Republican Party.

Incumbent President Ronald Reagan was ineligible to run for a third term due to the term limits established by the Twenty-second Amendment to the United States Constitution. As a result, it was the first election since 1968 to lack an incumbent president on the ballot. Bush entered the Republican primaries as the front-runner, defeating Kansas senator Bob Dole and televangelist Pat Robertson. He selected Indiana senator Dan Quayle as his running mate. Dukakis, campaigning on his state's record of strong economic growth, won the Democratic primaries after Gary Hart (a prominent "Atari Democrat" representing the party's moderate wing) withdrew and Ted Kennedy (representing the party's traditional liberal wing) declined to run. Dukakis selected Texas Senator Lloyd Bentsen as his running mate.

Bush ran an aggressive campaign that concentrated mainly on the strong economy, reduction in crime, and continuance with Reagan's policies. He attacked Dukakis as an elitist "Massachusetts liberal" and soft-on-crime, to which Dukakis ineffectively responded. Despite Dukakis initially leading in the polls, Bush pulled ahead after the Republican National Convention and extended his lead after two strong debate performances. Bush won a decisive victory over Dukakis, winning the Electoral College and the popular vote by sizable margins. Bush is the only sitting vice president to be elected president since Martin Van Buren in 1836. (Note: The first two were John Adams in 1796 and Thomas Jefferson in 1800.) Despite his loss, Dukakis flipped nine states that had voted Republican in 1984: Hawaii, Iowa, Massachusetts, New York, Oregon, Rhode Island, Washington, West Virginia, and Wisconsin.

Voters 44 years of age or younger (born in 1944 or later) were estimated by the exit poll to comprise 55% of the electorate. As such, Baby boomers and Generation X constituted the majority of the voting public.

As of 2026, this remains the most recent election in which a candidate won over 400 electoral votes, as well as 40 or more states. It is also the most recent open seat election in which the outgoing president's party retained the White House, and the most recent time in which a party won the presidency for a third consecutive term. As of 2026, this is the earliest election in which at least one of the major party nominees for president (Dukakis) or vice president (Quayle) is still alive, and is the most recent election where the Republican candidate won office for their first term while winning the popular vote.

== Republican Party nomination ==
=== Republican candidates ===
- George H. W. Bush, incumbent vice president from Texas
- Bob Dole, U.S. senator from Kansas
- Pete du Pont, former governor of Delaware
- Ben Fernandez, former special ambassador to Paraguay, from California
- Alexander Haig, former secretary of state, from Pennsylvania
- Jack Kemp, U.S. representative from New York
- Paul Laxalt, former U.S. senator from Nevada
- Pat Robertson, televangelist from Virginia
- Donald Rumsfeld, former secretary of defense from Illinois
- Harold Stassen, former governor of Minnesota

Republican Party (United States) 1988 Republican Party ticket
| George H. W. Bush | Dan Quayle |
| for President | for Vice President |
| 43rd Vice President of the United States (1981–1989) | U.S. Senator from Indiana (1981–1989) |
Campaign

=== Withdrawn candidates ===
Candidates in this section are sorted by popular vote from the primaries
| Bob Dole | Pat Robertson | Jack Kemp |
| U.S. Senator from Kansas (1969–1996) | Chair of CBN | U.S. Representative (1971–1989) |
| W: March 29; 2,333,375 votes | W: April 6; 1,097,446 votes | W: March 9; 331,333 votes |

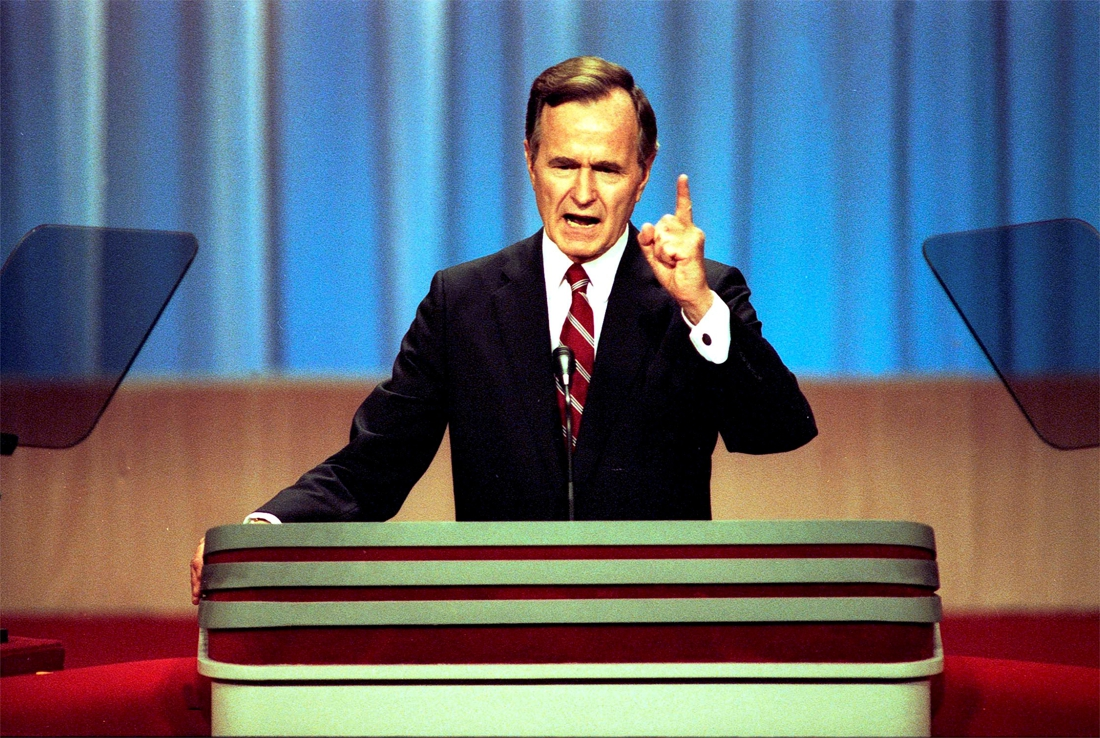
During his presidency, Bush's endorsement of the Omnibus Budget Reconciliation Act of 1990 violated his 1988 "no new taxes" pledge and badly damaged his popularity.

While Bush had long been seen as Reagan's natural successor, there was still a degree of opposition within the party to his candidacy. Historical precedent was not seen to favor Bush's chances, as no incumbent vice president had been elected as president since Martin Van Buren in 1836. Dole attracted support among those who were concerned that Bush, whose electoral experience outside of his campaigns with Reagan was limited to running unsuccessfully for the Senate and twice successfully for the House of Representatives in the 1960s, had not done enough to establish himself as a candidate in his own right. Others who wished to further continue the shift towards social conservatism that had begun during Reagan's presidency supported Robertson.

Bush unexpectedly came in third in the Iowa caucus, which he had won in 1980, behind Dole and Robertson. Dole was also leading in the polls of the New Hampshire primary, and the Bush camp responded by running television commercials portraying Dole as a tax raiser, while Governor John H. Sununu campaigned for Bush. Dole did nothing to counter these ads and Bush won, thereby gaining crucial momentum, which he called "Big Mo". Once the multiple-state primaries such as Super Tuesday began, Bush's organizational strength and fundraising lead were impossible for the other candidates to match, and the nomination was his. The Republican Party convention was held in New Orleans, Louisiana. Bush was nominated unanimously and selected U.S. senator Dan Quayle from Indiana as his running mate. In his acceptance speech, Bush made the pledge "Read my lips: No new taxes", which contributed to his loss in 1992.

== Democratic Party nomination ==
Democratic Party (United States) 1988 Democratic Party ticket
| Michael Dukakis | Lloyd Bentsen |
| for President | for Vice President |
| 65th and 67th governor of Massachusetts (1975–1979, 1983–1991) | U.S. senator from Texas (1971–1993) |
Campaign

Candidates in this section are sorted by date of withdrawal from the primaries
| Jesse Jackson | Al Gore | Paul Simon | Dick Gephardt | Gary Hart |
| President of the Rainbow Coalition from South Carolina (1983–2023) | U.S. senator from Tennessee (1985–1993) | U.S. senator from Illinois (1985–1997) | U.S. representative from Missouri (1977–2005) | U.S. senator from Colorado (1975–1987) |
| Campaign | Campaign | Campaign | Campaign | Campaign |
| LN: July 20, 1988; E: July 30, 1988; 6,788,991 votes 1,023 PD | S: April 21, 1988; E: June 16, 1988; 3,185,806 votes 374 PD | S: April 7, 1988; E: June 8, 1988; 1,082,960 votes 161 PD | W: March 28, 1988; E: June 8, 1988; 1,399,041 votes 137 PD | W: March 11, 1988; 415,716 votes |
| Bruce Babbitt | James Traficant | Patricia Schroeder | Joe Biden | |
| Fmr. governor of Arizona (1978–1987) | U.S. representative from Ohio (1985–2002) | U.S. representative from Colorado (1973–1997) | U.S. senator from Delaware (1973–2009) | |
| Campaign | | Campaign | Campaign | |
| W: February 18, 1988; E: June 8, 1988; 77,780 votes | ?: After January 26, 1988 | W: September 28, 1987 | W: September 23, 1987; E: June 22, 1988 | |

In 1984, the Democrats had nominated Walter Mondale, a traditional New Deal-type liberal, who advocated for those constituencies that Franklin D. Roosevelt forged into a majority coalition, as their candidate. When Mondale was defeated in a landslide, party leaders became eager to find a new approach to get away from the 1980 and 1984 debacles. After Bush's image was affected by his involvement on the Iran-Contra scandal much more than Reagan's, and after the Democrats won back control of the U.S. Senate in the 1986 congressional elections following an economic downturn, the party's leaders felt optimistic about having a closer race with the GOP in 1988, although probabilities of winning the presidency were still marginal given the climate of prosperity.

One goal of the party was to find a new, fresh candidate who could move beyond the traditional New Deal-Great Society ideas of the past and offer a new image of the Democrats to the public. To this end party leaders tried to recruit New York governor Mario Cuomo to be a candidate. Cuomo had impressed many Democrats with his keynote speech at the 1984 Democratic Convention, and they believed he would be a strong candidate. After Cuomo chose not to run, the Democratic frontrunner for most of 1987 was former Colorado senator Gary Hart. He had made a strong showing in the 1984 presidential primaries; after Mondale's defeat, he had positioned himself as the moderate and centrist many Democrats felt their party would need to win.

Questions and rumors about extramarital affairs and past debts dogged Hart's campaign. Hart had told New York Times reporters who questioned him about these rumors that, if they followed him around, they would "be bored". In a separate investigation, the Miami Herald had received an anonymous tip from a friend of Donna Rice that Rice was involved with Hart. After his affair emerged, the Herald reporters found Hart's quote in a pre-print of The New York Times Magazine. After the Herald's findings were publicized, many other media outlets picked up the story and Hart's ratings in the polls plummeted. On May 8, 1987, a week after the Rice story broke, Hart dropped out of the race. His campaign chair, Representative Patricia Schroeder, tested the waters for about four months after Hart's withdrawal, but decided in September 1987 that she would not run. In December 1987, Hart surprised many pundits by resuming his campaign, but the allegations of adultery had delivered a fatal blow to his candidacy, and he did poorly in the primaries before dropping out again.

Senator Ted Kennedy of Massachusetts had been considered a potential candidate, but he ruled himself out of the race in the fall of 1985. Two other politicians mentioned as possible candidates, both from Arkansas, did not join the race: Senator Dale Bumpers and Governor and future president Bill Clinton. Joe Biden's campaign also ended in controversy after he was accused of plagiarizing a speech by Neil Kinnock, then-leader of the British Labour Party. The Dukakis campaign secretly released a video in which Biden was filmed repeating a Kinnock stump speech with only minor modifications. Biden later called his failure to attribute the quotes an oversight, and in related proceedings the Delaware Supreme Court's Board on Professional Responsibility cleared him of a separate plagiarism charge, leveled for plagiarizing an article during his time in law school. This ultimately led him to drop out of the race. Dukakis later revealed that his campaign had leaked the tape, and two members of his staff resigned. Biden later ran three more times for the Democratic nomination, unsuccessfully in 2008, successfully in 2020, and initially ran for re-election as the party's presumptive nominee in 2024, but ultimately withdrew from the race before he was officially re-nominated. He was inaugurated as the 47th vice president in 2009, serving two terms under President Barack Obama. He became the 46th president in 2021, over 33 years after his first campaign for the office ended, and served one term.

Al Gore, a senator from Tennessee, chose to run for the nomination. Turning 40 in 1988, he would have been the youngest man to contest the presidency on a major party ticket since William Jennings Bryan in 1896, and the youngest president ever if elected, younger than John F. Kennedy at election age and Theodore Roosevelt at age of assumption of office. He eventually became the 45th vice president in 1993, serving two terms under President Bill Clinton, then the Democratic presidential nominee in 2000, losing to George W. Bush, George H. W. Bush's son.

=== Primaries ===
After Hart withdrew from the race, no clear frontrunner emerged before the primaries and caucuses began. The Iowa caucus was won by Dick Gephardt, who had been sagging heavily in the polls until, three weeks before the vote, he began campaigning as a populist and his numbers surged. Illinois senator Paul M. Simon finished a surprising second, and Massachusetts governor Michael Dukakis finished third. In the New Hampshire primary, Dukakis came in first, Gephardt fell to second, and Simon came in third. In an effort to weaken Gephardt's candidacy, both Dukakis and Gore ran negative television ads against Gephardt. The ads convinced the United Auto Workers, which had endorsed Gephardt, to withdraw their endorsement; this crippled Gephardt, as he relied heavily on the support of labor unions.

In the Super Tuesday races, Dukakis won six primaries, to Gore's five, Jesse Jackson five and Gephardt one, with Gore and Jackson splitting the Southern states. The next week, Simon won Illinois with Jackson finishing second. Jackson captured 6.9 million votes and won 11 contests: seven primaries (Alabama, the District of Columbia, Georgia, Louisiana, Mississippi, Puerto Rico, and Virginia) and four caucuses (Delaware, Michigan, South Carolina and Vermont). He also scored March victories in Alaska's caucuses and Texas's local conventions, despite losing the Texas primary. Briefly, after he won 55% of the vote in the Michigan Democratic caucus, he had more pledged delegates than all the other candidates. Jackson's campaign suffered a significant setback less than two weeks later when he was defeated in the Wisconsin primary by Dukakis. Dukakis's win in New York and then in Pennsylvania effectively ended Jackson's hopes for the nomination.

=== Democratic Convention ===
The Democratic Party Convention was held in Atlanta, Georgia from July 18–21. Arkansas governor Bill Clinton placed Dukakis's name in nomination, and delivered his speech, scheduled to be 15 minutes long but lasting so long that some delegates began booing to get him to finish; he received great cheering when he said, "In closing..." Texas state treasurer Ann Richards, who was elected the state governor two years later, gave a speech attacking Bush, including the line "Poor George, he can't help it, he was born with a silver foot in his mouth". With only Jackson remaining as an active candidate to oppose Dukakis, the tally for president was as follows:

Balloting
| Presidential ballot | | Vice presidential ballot | |
| Michael S. Dukakis | 2,876.25 | Lloyd M. Bentsen | 4,162 |
| Jesse L. Jackson | 1,218.5 | | |
| Richard H. Stallings | 3 | | |
| Joe Biden | 2 | | |
| Richard A. Gephardt | 2 | | |
| Gary W. Hart | 1 | | |
| Lloyd M. Bentsen | 1 | | |

Jackson's supporters said that since their candidate had finished in second place, he was entitled to the vice presidential nomination. Dukakis disagreed, and instead selected Senator Lloyd Bentsen from Texas. Bentsen's selection led many in the media to dub the ticket the "Boston-Austin" axis, and to compare it to the pairing of John F. Kennedy and Lyndon B. Johnson in the 1960 presidential campaign. Like Dukakis and Bentsen, Kennedy and Johnson were from Massachusetts and Texas, respectively.

== Other nominations ==
=== Libertarian Party ===
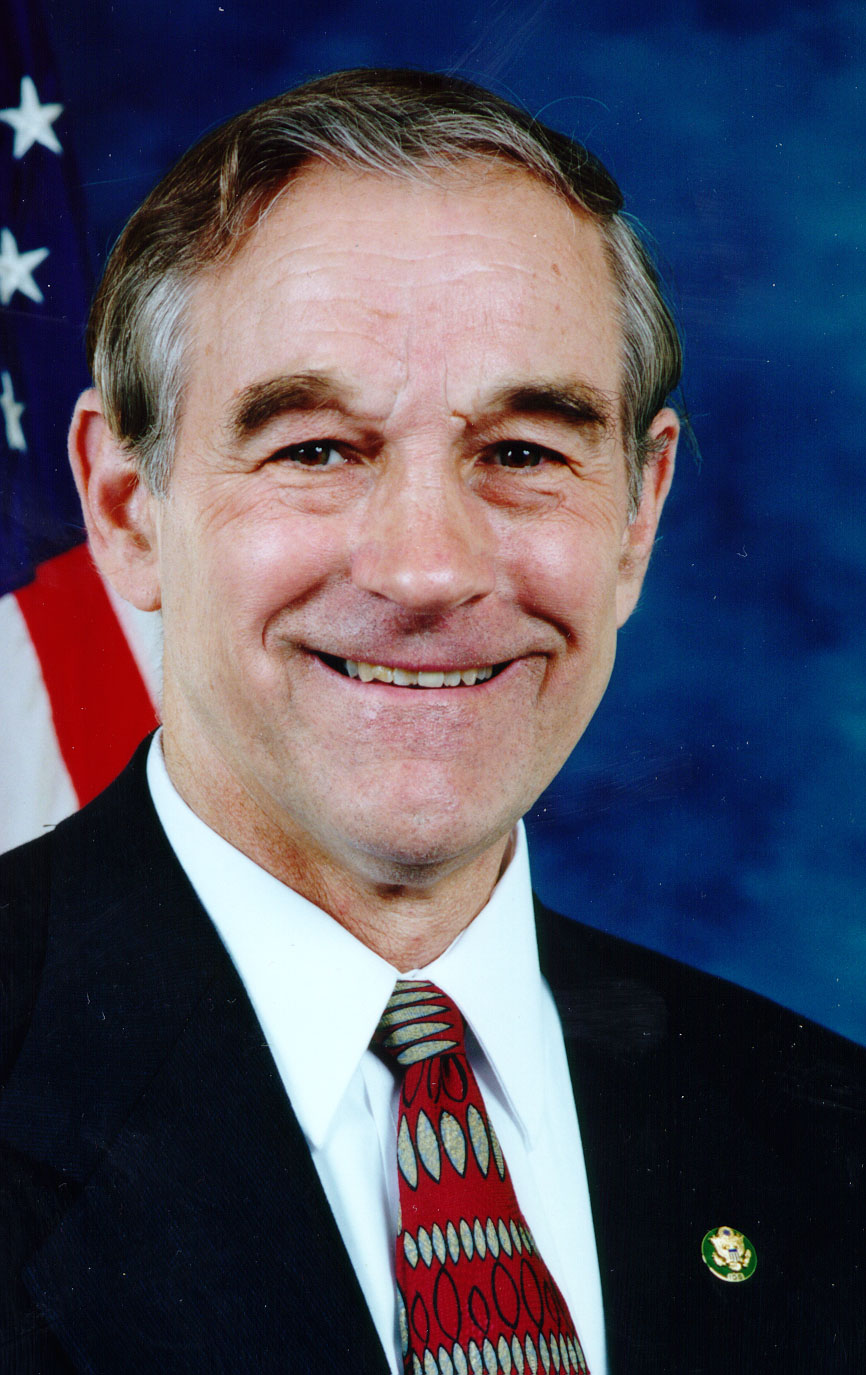
Former Representative Ron Paul ran on the Libertarian ticket. He returned to the House of Representatives in 1997 as a Republican.

Ron Paul and Andre Marrou formed the ticket for the Libertarian Party. Their campaign called for the adoption of a global policy on military nonintervention, advocated an end to the federal government's involvement with education, and criticized Reagan's "bailout" of the Soviet Union. Paul was a former member of the U.S. House of Representatives, first elected as a Republican from Texas in an April 1976 special election. He was known as an opponent of the war on drugs.

=== New Alliance Party ===
Lenora Fulani ran for the New Alliance Party, and focused on issues concerning unemployment, healthcare, and homelessness. The party had full ballot access, meaning Fulani and her running mate, Joyce Dattner, were the first pair of women to receive ballot access in all 50 states. Fulani was the first African American to do so.

=== Socialist Party ===
Willa Kenoyer and Ron Ehrenreich ran for the Socialist Party, advocating a decentralist government approach with policies determined by the needs of the workers.

=== Populist Party ===
David Duke stood for the Populist Party. A former leader of the Louisiana Ku Klux Klan, he advocated a mixture of White nationalist and separatist policies with more traditionally conservative positions, such as opposition to most immigration from Latin America and to affirmative action.

== General election ==
=== Campaign ===
During the election, the Bush campaign sought to portray Dukakis as an unreasonable "Massachusetts liberal". Dukakis was attacked for such positions as opposing mandatory recitation of the Pledge of Allegiance in schools, and being a "card-carrying member of the ACLU" (a statement Dukakis made early in the primary campaign to appeal to liberal voters). Dukakis responded by saying that he was a "proud liberal" and that the phrase should not be a bad word in America. Bush pledged to continue Reagan's policies but also vowed a "kinder and gentler nation" in an attempt to win over more moderate voters. The duties delegated to him during Reagan's second term (mostly because of the president's advanced age, Reagan turning 78 just after he left office) gave him an unusually high level of experience for a vice president.

A graduate of Yale University, Bush derided Dukakis for having "foreign-policy views born in Harvard Yard's boutique". New York Times columnist Maureen Dowd asked, "Wasn't this a case of the pot calling the kettle elite?" Bush said that, unlike Harvard, Yale's reputation was "so diffuse, there isn't a symbol, I don't think, in the Yale situation, any symbolism in it ... Harvard boutique to me has the connotation of liberalism and elitism", and said he intended Harvard to represent "a philosophical enclave", not a statement about class. Columnist Russell Baker wrote, "Voters inclined to loathe and fear elite Ivy League schools rarely make fine distinctions between Yale and Harvard. All they know is that both are full of rich, fancy, stuck-up and possibly dangerous intellectuals who never sit down to supper in their undershirt no matter how hot the weather gets."

Dukakis was badly damaged by the Republicans' campaign commercials, including "Boston Harbor", which attacked his failure to clean up environmental pollution in the harbor, and especially by two commercials that were accused of being racially charged, "Revolving Door" and "Weekend Passes", that portrayed him as soft on crime. Dukakis was a strong supporter of Massachusetts's prison furlough program, which had begun before he was governor. As governor, Dukakis vetoed a 1976 plan to bar inmates convicted of first-degree murder from the furlough program. In 1986, the program had resulted in the release of convicted murderer Willie Horton, an African American man who committed a rape and assault in Maryland while out on furlough. A number of false rumors about Dukakis were reported in the media, including Idaho Republican Senator Steve Symms's claim that Dukakis's wife Kitty had burned an American flag to protest the Vietnam War, as well as the claim that Dukakis himself had been treated for mental illness.

==== "Dukakis in the tank" ====
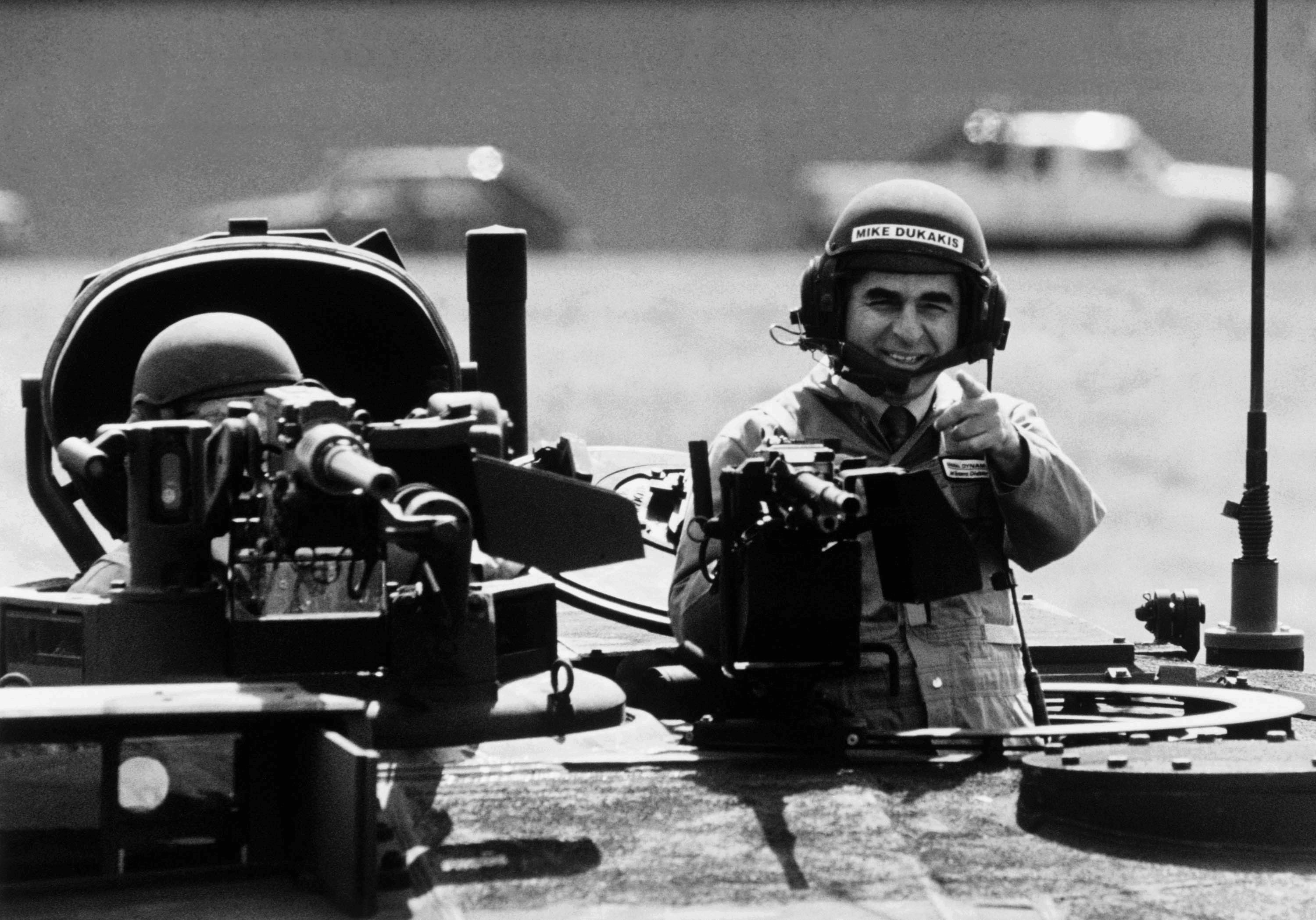
Dukakis on the tank

Dukakis attempted to quell criticism that he was ignorant on military matters by staging a photo op in which he rode in an M1 Abrams tank outside a General Dynamics plant in Sterling Heights, Michigan. The move ended up being regarded as a major public relations blunder, with many mocking Dukakis's appearance as he waved to the crowd from the tank. The Bush campaign used the footage in an attack ad, accompanied by a rolling text listing Dukakis's vetoes of military-related bills. The incident remains a commonly cited example of backfired public relations.

==== Dan Quayle ====
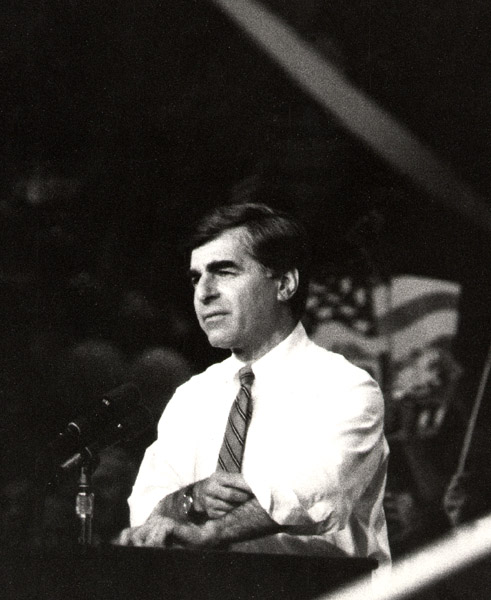
Dukakis at a campaign rally at UCLA's Pauley Pavilion on the eve of the 1988 election

One reason for Bush's choice of Senator Dan Quayle as his running mate was to appeal to younger Americans identified with the "Reagan Revolution". Quayle's looks were praised by Senator John McCain: "I can't believe a guy that handsome wouldn't have some impact." But Quayle was not a seasoned politician, and made a number of embarrassing statements. The Dukakis team attacked Quayle's credentials, saying he was "dangerously inexperienced to be first-in-line to the presidency."

During the vice presidential debate, Quayle attempted to dispel such allegations by comparing his experience with that of pre-1960 John F. Kennedy, who had also been a young politician when running for the presidency (Kennedy had served 13 years in Congress to Quayle's 12). Quayle said, "I have as much experience in the Congress as Jack Kennedy did when he sought the presidency." Dukakis's running mate Lloyd Bentsen responded, "Senator, I served with Jack Kennedy. I knew Jack Kennedy. Jack Kennedy was a friend of mine. Senator, you're no Jack Kennedy." Quayle responded, "That was really uncalled for, Senator", to which Bentsen said, "You are the one that was making the comparison, Senator, and I'm one who knew him well. And frankly I think you are so far apart in the objectives you choose for your country that I did not think the comparison was well-taken."

Democrats replayed Quayle's reaction to Bentsen's comment in subsequent ads as an announcer intoned, "Quayle: just a heartbeat away." Despite much press about the Kennedy comments, this did not reduce Bush's lead in the polls. Quayle had sought to use the debate to criticize Dukakis as too liberal rather than go point for point with the more seasoned Bentsen. Bentsen's attempts to defend Dukakis received little recognition, with greater attention on the Kennedy comparison.

==== Greek issue ====
Dukakis constantly used his Greek roots in his speeches, and Greek Americans fundraised more than 3 million dollars for his campaign. The Washington Post named Dukakis' ethnicity "the great unspoken issue in this election" with his ethnicity not playing well with WASP communities.

==== Jennifer Fitzgerald and Donna Brazile firing ====
During the course of the campaign, Dukakis fired his deputy field director Donna Brazile after she spread unsubstantiated rumors that Bush had had an affair with his assistant Jennifer Fitzgerald. Bush and Fitzgerald's relationship was briefly rehashed in the 1992 campaign.

==== Bush assassination threat ====
On September 27, 1988, 21-year-old David A. Russell of Owensboro, Kentucky, attended a nearby campaign rally armed with a .45 caliber pistol. As Bush shook hands with supporters, Russell took photographs of him roughly 50 yards away. Two days later, he wrote a letter to the White House, demanding that Bush drop out of the race, and attached a photo he had taken at the rally. He threatened to assassinate Bush if he refused. The letter was traced back to Russell, and he was arrested and charged. In 1989, he was convicted and sentenced to 22 months in prison, three years of probation, and to pay a $5,000 fine.

=== Presidential debates ===
There were two presidential debates and one vice-presidential debate. Voters were split as to who won the first presidential debate. Bush improved in the second debate. Before the second debate, Dukakis had been suffering from the flu and spent much of the day in bed. His performance was generally seen as poor and played to his reputation of being intellectually cold. Reporter Bernard Shaw opened the debate by asking Dukakis whether he would support the death penalty if Kitty Dukakis were raped and murdered; Dukakis said "no" and discussed the statistical ineffectiveness of capital punishment. Some commentators thought the question itself was unfair, in that it injected an overly emotional element into the discussion of a policy issue, but many observers felt Dukakis's answer lacked the normal emotions one would expect of a person talking about a loved one's rape and murder. Tom Brokaw of NBC reported on his October 14 newscast, "The consensus tonight is that Vice President George Bush won last night's debate and made it all the harder for Governor Michael Dukakis to catch and pass him in the 25 days remaining. In all of the Friday morning quarterbacking, there was common agreement that Dukakis failed to seize the debate and make it his night."

Debates among candidates for the 1988 U.S. presidential election
| No. | Date | Host | Location | Panelists | Moderator | Participants | Viewership (millions) |
|---|---|---|---|---|---|---|---|
| P1 | Sunday, September 25, 1988 | Wake Forest University | Winston-Salem, North Carolina | John Mashek; Peter Jennings; Anne Groer | Jim Lehrer | Vice President George H. W. Bush; Governor Michael Dukakis | 65.1 |
| VP | Wednesday, October 5, 1988 | Omaha Civic Auditorium | Omaha, Nebraska | Tom Brokaw; Jon Margolis; Brit Hume | Judy Woodruff | Senator Dan Quayle; Senator Lloyd Bentsen | 46.9 |
| P2 | Thursday, October 13, 1988 | University of California, Los Angeles | Los Angeles | Andrea Mitchell; Ann Compton; Margaret Warner | Bernard Shaw | Vice President George H. W. Bush; Governor Michael Dukakis | 67.3 |

=== Dukakis' new strategy ===
By October, the Dukakis campaign was in dire straits. A poor performance in the second debate caused his numbers to flatline, and an NBC News poll showed Bush leading Dukakis by seventeen percentage points. In response, Dukakis shifted his campaign rhetoric. He embraced the label "liberal", referring to himself as "a liberal in the tradition of Franklin D. Roosevelt and Harry S. Truman and John F. Kennedy". He also promoted unabashedly populist economic themes reminiscent of primary challenger Dick Gephardt and adopted the slogan "We're on your side", suggesting that Bush's economic policies were regressive and elitist. In one Texas ad, Bentsen pointed out that wages were higher in Japan than Texas, claiming he and Dukakis would "put America first" when elected. Speaking in Lexington, Kentucky, Dukakis declared, "We’re going to take back our government from the influence peddlers and the sleaze merchants", as well as "dishonest contractors and polluters". Bush responded by calling Dukakis a liberal and accusing him of dividing the country with his populist, anti-establishment rhetoric. As a new national poll showed Dukakis cutting Bush's lead down to eight percentage points amidst gains with union voters, Newsweek's Conventional Wisdom showed a down arrow next to Bush and an up arrow next to Dukakis, adding "Old CW: It’s over. New CW: Did someone say it’s over? Not us".

Sensing the changing winds, the Dukakis campaign revised their strategy, abandoning their national campaign and instead waging a targeted effort in eighteen Dukakis-leaning and competitive states in the Northeast, Midwest, and West Coast that, if carried together, would amount to a 272-electoral-vote victory even if Dukakis lost the national popular vote. (Note: The eighteen states Dukakis hoped to carry were New York, Pennsylvania, Ohio, Michigan, Illinois, California, Massachusetts, Connecticut, Vermont, Rhode Island, Maryland, West Virginia, Iowa, Wisconsin, Oregon, Washington, Hawaii, and the District of Columbia.) They also identified states in the Plains and West that were still competitive despite leaning Bush overall, such as the Dakotas, Montana, New Mexico, Colorado, Missouri, and Kentucky. Bush did not change his campaign strategy and continued to air negative attacks against Dukakis.

=== Polling ===
| Poll source | Date(s) administered | Sample size | Margin of error | George Bush (R) | Michael Dukakis (D) | Other | Undecided |
|---|---|---|---|---|---|---|---|
| New York Times/CBS News | May 9–12, 1988 | 1,056 RV | ± % | 39% | 49% | — | — |
| Gallup | June 24–26, 1988 | 1,056 RV | ± 3% | 41% | 46% | — | — |
| New York Times/CBS News | July 8–10, 1988 | 1,002 RV | ± % | 41% | 47% | — | — |
July 18–21: Democratic National Convention
| Gallup | July 21–22, 1988 | 948 RV | ± 4% | 38% | 55% | — | — |
August 15–18: Republican National Convention
| Wall Street Journal/NBC News | August 20–22, 1988 | 1,762 RV | ± 3% | 44% | 39% | — | — |
| Gallup | September 9–14, 1988 | 2,001 RV | ± % | 50% | 44% | — | — |
| ABC News/Washington Post | September 14–19, 1988 | 1,271 LV | ± 3% | 50% | 46% | — | — |
| NBC News/Wall Street Journal | September 16–19, 1988 | 2,630 RV | ± 2% | 45% | 41% | — | — |
Sep. 25: Presidential debate
| Gallup | September 27–28, 1988 | 1,020 RV | ± 3% | 47% | 42% | — | — |
Oct. 13: Presidential debate
| NBC News/Wall Street Journal | October 14–16, 1988 | 1,378 LV | ± 3% | 55% | 38% | — | — |
| NBC News/Wall Street Journal | October 23–26, 1988 | 1,285 LV | ± 4% | 51% | 42% | — | — |
| CBS News/New York Times | November 1–3, 1988 | LV | ± 3% | 51% | 44% | – | – |

== Results ==
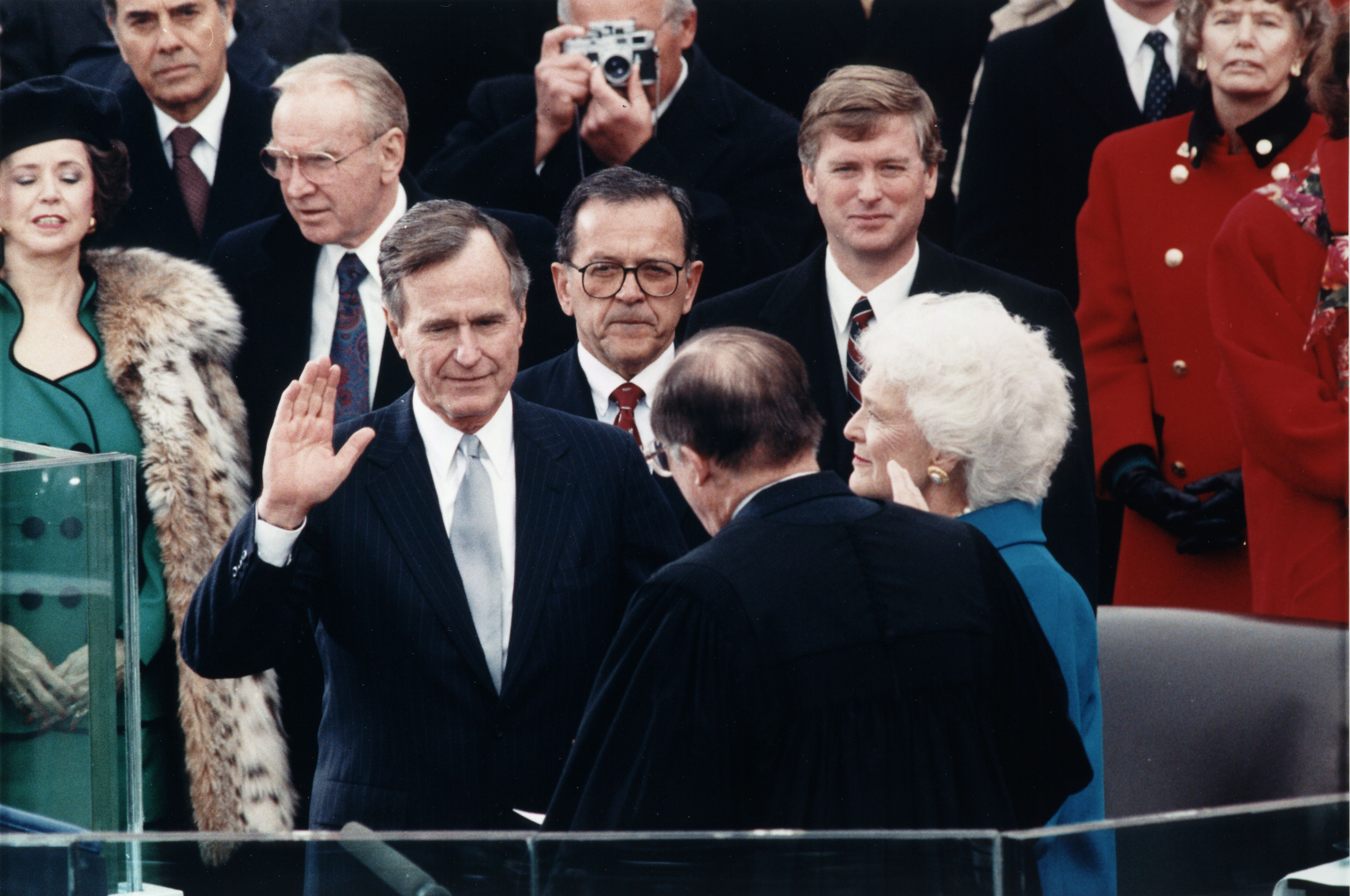
Chief Justice William Rehnquist administering the oath of office to President George H. W. Bush on January 20, 1989, at the United States Capitol

In the November 8 election, Bush won a majority of the popular vote and the Electoral College. Neither his popular vote percentage (53.4%), his total electoral votes (426), nor his number of states won (40) have been surpassed in any subsequent presidential election. Conversely, it began an ongoing streak of presidential elections that were decided by a single-digit popular vote margin.

This is the most recent election whereby both major party candidates shared the same birth state, which in this case, was Massachusetts. Like Reagan in 1980 and 1984, Bush performed very strongly among suburban voters, in areas such as the collar counties of Chicago (winning over 60% in DuPage and Lake counties), Philadelphia (sweeping the Main Line counties), Baltimore, Los Angeles (winning over 60% in the Republican bastions of Orange and San Diego counties) and New York. As of 2024, Bush is the last Republican to win the heavily suburban states of California, Connecticut, Delaware, Illinois, Maryland, and New Jersey. He is also the last Republican candidate to win rural Vermont, which was historically Republican but by this time shifting away from the party, as well as the last Republican candidate to win Maine in its entirety, although Donald Trump won one electoral vote from the state in 2016, 2020, and 2024. (Note: Maine is one of two states that allows split electoral college votes. Maine's 2nd congressional district has voted Republican in every election since 2016; however, Bush remains the last Republican to carry the entire state.) Bush lost New York state by just over 4%.

In contrast to the suburbs, a solidly Republican constituency, Bush received a significantly lower level of support than Reagan in rural regions. Farm states had fared poorly during the Reagan administration, and Dukakis was the beneficiary. Bush was the first Republican to win the presidency without Iowa, a feat reprised by his son George W. Bush in 2000.

This is the last election where Michigan and Pennsylvania voted Republican until 2016, New Mexico until 2004, and Arkansas, Kentucky, Louisiana, Missouri, Nevada, New Hampshire, Ohio, and Tennessee until 2000. This is the last election where no state was decided by a margin under 1%. In Illinois, Bush lost a number of downstate counties that previously went for Reagan, and he lost Iowa by a wide margin, even losing in traditionally Republican areas. Bush also performed weaker in Missouri's northern counties, narrowly winning that state. In three typically solid Republican states, Kansas, South Dakota, and Montana, the vote was much closer than usual.

The rural state of West Virginia, though not an agricultural economy, narrowly flipped back into the Democratic column. This was the last election that West Virginia voted for a losing Democratic nominee, and that West Virginia and neighboring Kentucky did not vote for the same candidate.

Bush performed strongest in the South and West. Despite Bentsen's presence on the Democratic ticket, Bush won Texas by 12 points. He lost the states of the Pacific Northwest but narrowly held California in the Republican column for the sixth straight time. As of 2024, this was the last election in which the Republican candidate won the support of a majority or plurality of women voters.

This is the last presidential election in which the Rust Belt states of Michigan, Pennsylvania, and Wisconsin did not vote for the same candidate. In addition, it is the most recent presidential election in which the Democratic candidate gave a concession speech on election night.

=== Electoral results ===
Electoral results
| Presidential candidate | Party | Home state | Popular vote | | Electoral vote | Running mate | | |
| Presidential candidate | Party | Home state | Count | Percentage | Electoral vote | Vice-presidential candidate | Home state | Electoral vote |
|---|---|---|---|---|---|---|---|---|
| George H. W. Bush | Republican | Texas | 48,886,597 | 53.37% | 426 | Dan Quayle | Indiana | 426 |
| Michael Dukakis | Democratic | Massachusetts | 41,809,476 | 45.65% | 111 | Lloyd Bentsen | Texas | 111 |
| Lloyd Bentsen | Democratic | Texas | —^{(a)} | —^{(a)} | 1 | Michael Dukakis | Massachusetts | 1 |
| Ron Paul | Libertarian | Texas | 431,750 | 0.47% | 0 | Andre Marrou | Alaska | 0 |
| Lenora Fulani | New Alliance | Pennsylvania | 217,221 | 0.24% | 0 | —^{(b)} | — | 0 |
| Other | | | 249,642 | 0.27% | — | Other | | — |
| Total | | | 91,594,686 | 100% | 538 | | | 538 |
| Needed to win | | | | | 270 | | | 270 |

Source (popular vote): "Electoral College Box Scores 1789–1996". National Archives and Records Administration., Leip, David. "1988 Presidential Election Results". Dave Leip's Atlas of U.S. Presidential Elections.

Source (electoral vote): "Electoral College Box Scores 1789–1996". National Archives and Records Administration.
^{(a)} West Virginia faithless elector Margarette Leach voted for Bentsen as president and Dukakis as vice president in order to make a statement against the U.S. Electoral College.
^{(b)} Fulani's running mate varied from state to state. Among the six vice presidential candidates were Joyce Dattner, Harold Moore, and Wynonia Burke.

Popular vote
| Bush | 53.37% |
| Dukakis | 45.65% |
| Paul | 0.47% |
| Others | 0.51% |

Electoral vote
| Bush | 79.18% |
| Dukakis | 20.63% |
| Bentsen | 0.19% |

=== Results by state ===
Legend
States/districts won by Dukakis/Bentsen
States/districts won by Bush/Quayle
| † | At-large results (Maine used the Congressional District Method) |

| Source: | | George H.W. Bush Republican | | | Michael Dukakis Democratic | | | Ron Paul Libertarian | | | Lenora Fulani New Alliance | | | Margin | | Margin Swing | State Total | |
| State | electoral votes | # | % | electoral votes | # | % | electoral votes | # | % | electoral votes | # | % | electoral votes | # | % | % | # | |
|---|---|---|---|---|---|---|---|---|---|---|---|---|---|---|---|---|---|---|
| Alabama | 9 | 815,576 | 59.17 | 9 | 549,506 | 39.86 | – | 8,460 | 0.61 | – | 3,311 | 0.24 | – | 266,070 | 19.30 | −2.93 | 1,378,476 | AL |
| Alaska | 3 | 119,251 | 59.59 | 3 | 72,584 | 36.27 | – | 5,484 | 2.74 | – | 1,024 | 0.51 | – | 46,667 | 23.32 | −13.47 | 200,116 | AK |
| Arizona | 7 | 702,541 | 59.95 | 7 | 454,029 | 38.74 | – | 13,351 | 1.14 | – | 1,662 | 0.14 | – | 248,512 | 21.21 | −12.67 | 1,171,873 | AZ |
| Arkansas | 6 | 466,578 | 56.37 | 6 | 349,237 | 42.19 | – | 3,297 | 0.40 | – | 2,161 | 0.26 | – | 117,341 | 14.18 | −8.00 | 827,738 | AR |
| California | 47 | 5,054,917 | 51.13 | 47 | 4,702,233 | 47.56 | – | 70,105 | 0.71 | – | 31,180 | 0.32 | – | 352,684 | 3.57 | −12.68 | 9,887,064 | CA |
| Colorado | 8 | 728,177 | 53.06 | 8 | 621,453 | 45.28 | – | 15,482 | 1.13 | – | 2,539 | 0.19 | – | 106,724 | 7.78 | −20.54 | 1,372,394 | CO |
| Connecticut | 8 | 750,241 | 51.98 | 8 | 676,584 | 46.87 | – | 14,071 | 0.97 | – | 2,491 | 0.17 | – | 73,657 | 5.10 | −16.80 | 1,443,394 | CT |
| Delaware | 3 | 139,639 | 55.88 | 3 | 108,647 | 43.48 | – | 1,162 | 0.47 | – | 443 | 0.18 | – | 30,992 | 12.40 | −7.45 | 249,891 | DE |
| D.C. | 3 | 27,590 | 14.30 | – | 159,407 | 82.65 | 3 | 554 | 0.29 | – | 2,901 | 1.50 | – | −131,817 | −68.34 | 3.32 | 192,877 | DC |
| Florida | 21 | 2,618,885 | 60.87 | 21 | 1,656,701 | 38.51 | – | 19,796 | 0.46 | – | 6,655 | 0.15 | – | 962,184 | 22.36 | −8.30 | 4,302,313 | FL |
| Georgia | 12 | 1,081,331 | 59.75 | 12 | 714,792 | 39.50 | – | 8,435 | 0.47 | – | 5,099 | 0.28 | – | 366,539 | 20.25 | −0.14 | 1,809,672 | GA |
| Hawaii | 4 | 158,625 | 44.75 | – | 192,364 | 54.27 | 4 | 1,999 | 0.56 | – | 1,003 | 0.28 | – | −33,739 | −9.52 | −20.80 | 354,461 | HI |
| Idaho | 4 | 253,881 | 62.08 | 4 | 147,272 | 36.01 | – | 5,313 | 1.30 | – | 2,502 | 0.61 | – | 106,609 | 26.07 | −19.90 | 408,968 | ID |
| Illinois | 24 | 2,310,939 | 50.69 | 24 | 2,215,940 | 48.60 | – | 14,944 | 0.33 | – | 10,276 | 0.23 | – | 94,999 | 2.08 | −10.80 | 4,559,120 | IL |
| Indiana | 12 | 1,297,763 | 59.84 | 12 | 860,643 | 39.69 | – | – | – | – | 10,215 | 0.47 | – | 437,120 | 20.16 | −3.83 | 2,168,621 | IN |
| Iowa | 8 | 545,355 | 44.50 | – | 670,557 | 54.71 | 8 | 2,494 | 0.20 | – | 540 | 0.04 | – | −125,202 | −10.22 | −17.61 | 1,225,614 | IA |
| Kansas | 7 | 554,049 | 55.79 | 7 | 422,636 | 42.56 | – | 12,553 | 1.26 | – | 3,806 | 0.38 | – | 131,413 | 13.23 | −20.44 | 993,044 | KS |
| Kentucky | 9 | 734,281 | 55.52 | 9 | 580,368 | 43.88 | – | 2,118 | 0.16 | – | 1,256 | 0.09 | – | 153,913 | 11.64 | −9.02 | 1,322,517 | KY |
| Louisiana | 10 | 883,702 | 54.27 | 10 | 734,281 | 44.06 | – | 4,115 | 0.25 | – | 2,355 | 0.14 | – | 166,242 | 10.21 | −12.39 | 1,628,202 | LA |
| Maine † | 2 | 307,131 | 55.34 | 2 | 243,569 | 43.88 | – | 2,700 | 0.49 | – | 1,405 | 0.25 | – | 63,562 | 11.45 | −10.60 | 555,035 | ME |
| Maine-1 | 1 | 169,292 | 56.36 | 1 | 131,078 | 43.64 | – | 1,555 | 0.51 | – | 739 | 0.24 | – | 38,214 | 12.72 | −7.09 | 300,370 | ME1 |
| Maine-2 | 1 | 137,839 | 55.06 | 1 | 112,491 | 44.94 | – | 1,145 | 0.45 | – | 666 | 0.26 | – | 25,348 | 10.12 | −14.66 | 250,330 | ME2 |
| Maryland | 10 | 876,167 | 51.11 | 10 | 826,304 | 48.20 | – | 6,748 | 0.39 | – | 5,115 | 0.30 | – | 49,863 | 2.91 | −2.58 | 1,714,358 | MD |
| Massachusetts | 13 | 1,194,644 | 45.38 | – | 1,401,406 | 53.23 | 13 | 24,251 | 0.92 | – | 9,561 | 0.36 | – | −206,762 | −7.85 | −10.64 | 2,632,805 | MA |
| Michigan | 20 | 1,965,486 | 53.57 | 20 | 1,675,783 | 45.67 | – | 18,336 | 0.50 | – | 2,513 | 0.07 | – | 289,703 | 7.90 | −11.09 | 3,669,163 | MI |
| Minnesota | 10 | 962,337 | 45.90 | – | 1,109,471 | 52.91 | 10 | 5,109 | 0.24 | – | 1,734 | 0.08 | – | −147,134 | −7.02 | −6.84 | 2,096,790 | MN |
| Mississippi | 7 | 557,890 | 59.89 | 7 | 363,921 | 39.07 | – | 3,329 | 0.36 | – | 2,155 | 0.23 | – | 193,969 | 20.82 | −3.57 | 931,527 | MS |
| Missouri | 11 | 1,084,953 | 51.83 | 11 | 1,001,619 | 47.85 | – | – | – | – | 6,656 | 0.32 | – | 83,334 | 3.98 | −16.07 | 2,093,228 | MO |
| Montana | 4 | 190,412 | 52.07 | 4 | 168,936 | 46.20 | – | 5,047 | 1.38 | – | 1,279 | 0.35 | – | 21,476 | 5.87 | −16.43 | 365,674 | MT |
| Nebraska | 5 | 398,447 | 60.15 | 5 | 259,646 | 39.20 | – | 2,536 | 0.38 | – | 1,743 | 0.26 | – | 138,801 | 20.96 | −20.78 | 662,372 | NE |
| Nevada | 4 | 206,040 | 58.86 | 4 | 132,738 | 37.92 | – | 3,520 | 1.01 | – | 835 | 0.24 | – | 73,302 | 20.94 | −12.94 | 350,067 | NV |
| New Hampshire | 4 | 281,537 | 62.49 | 4 | 163,696 | 36.33 | – | 4,502 | 1.00 | – | 790 | 0.18 | – | 117,841 | 26.16 | −11.54 | 450,525 | NH |
| New Jersey | 16 | 1,743,192 | 56.24 | 16 | 1,320,352 | 42.60 | – | 8,421 | 0.27 | – | 5,139 | 0.17 | – | 422,840 | 13.64 | −7.25 | 3,099,553 | NJ |
| New Mexico | 5 | 270,341 | 51.86 | 5 | 244,497 | 46.90 | – | 3,268 | 0.63 | – | 2,237 | 0.43 | – | 25,844 | 4.96 | −15.52 | 521,287 | NM |
| New York | 36 | 3,081,871 | 47.52 | – | 3,347,882 | 51.62 | 36 | 12,109 | 0.19 | – | 15,845 | 0.24 | – | −266,011 | −4.10 | −12.11 | 6,485,683 | NY |
| North Carolina | 13 | 1,237,258 | 57.97 | 13 | 890,167 | 41.71 | – | 1,263 | 0.06 | – | 5,682 | 0.27 | – | 347,091 | 16.26 | −7.74 | 2,134,370 | NC |
| North Dakota | 3 | 166,559 | 56.03 | 3 | 127,739 | 42.97 | – | 1,315 | 0.44 | – | 396 | 0.13 | – | 38,820 | 13.06 | −17.98 | 297,261 | ND |
| Ohio | 23 | 2,416,549 | 55.00 | 23 | 1,939,629 | 44.15 | – | 11,989 | 0.27 | – | 12,017 | 0.27 | – | 476,920 | 10.85 | −7.91 | 4,393,699 | OH |
| Oklahoma | 8 | 678,367 | 57.93 | 8 | 483,423 | 41.28 | – | 6,261 | 0.53 | – | 2,985 | 0.25 | – | 194,944 | 16.65 | −21.29 | 1,171,036 | OK |
| Oregon | 7 | 560,126 | 46.61 | – | 616,206 | 51.28 | 7 | 14,811 | 1.23 | – | 6,487 | 0.54 | – | −56,080 | −4.67 | −16.84 | 1,201,694 | OR |
| Pennsylvania | 25 | 2,300,087 | 50.70 | 25 | 2,194,944 | 48.39 | – | 12,051 | 0.27 | – | 4,379 | 0.10 | – | 105,143 | 2.32 | −5.03 | 4,536,251 | PA |
| Rhode Island | 4 | 177,761 | 43.93 | – | 225,123 | 55.64 | 4 | 825 | 0.20 | – | 280 | 0.07 | – | −47,362 | −11.71 | −15.36 | 404,620 | RI |
| South Carolina | 8 | 606,443 | 61.50 | 8 | 370,554 | 37.58 | – | 4,935 | 0.50 | – | 4,077 | 0.41 | – | 235,889 | 23.92 | −4.07 | 986,009 | SC |
| South Dakota | 3 | 165,415 | 52.85 | 3 | 145,560 | 46.51 | – | 1,060 | 0.34 | – | 730 | 0.23 | – | 19,855 | 6.34 | −20.13 | 312,991 | SD |
| Tennessee | 11 | 947,233 | 57.89 | 11 | 679,794 | 41.55 | – | 2,041 | 0.12 | – | 1,334 | 0.08 | – | 267,439 | 16.34 | 0.07 | 1,636,250 | TN |
| Texas | 29 | 3,036,829 | 55.95 | 29 | 2,352,748 | 43.35 | – | 30,355 | 0.56 | – | 7,208 | 0.13 | – | 684,081 | 12.60 | −14.90 | 5,427,410 | TX |
| Utah | 5 | 428,442 | 66.22 | 5 | 207,343 | 32.05 | – | 7,473 | 1.16 | – | 455 | 0.07 | – | 221,099 | 34.17 | −15.66 | 647,008 | UT |
| Vermont | 3 | 124,331 | 51.10 | 3 | 115,775 | 47.58 | – | 1,003 | 0.41 | – | 205 | 0.08 | – | 8,556 | 3.52 | −13.59 | 243,333 | VT |
| Virginia | 12 | 1,309,162 | 59.74 | 12 | 859,799 | 39.23 | – | 8,336 | 0.38 | – | 14,312 | 0.65 | – | 449,363 | 20.50 | −4.69 | 2,191,609 | VA |
| Washington | 10 | 903,835 | 48.46 | – | 933,516 | 50.05 | 10 | 17,240 | 0.92 | – | 3,520 | 0.19 | – | −29,681 | −1.59 | −14.56 | 1,865,253 | WA |
| West Virginia | 6 | 310,065 | 47.46 | – | 341,016 | 52.20 | 5 | – | – | – | 2,230 | 0.34 | – | −30,951 | −4.74 | −15.25 | 653,311 | WV |
| Wisconsin | 11 | 1,047,499 | 47.80 | – | 1,126,794 | 51.41 | 11 | 5,157 | 0.24 | – | 1,953 | 0.09 | – | −79,295 | −3.62 | −12.80 | 2,191,608 | WI |
| Wyoming | 3 | 106,867 | 60.53 | 3 | 67,113 | 38.01 | – | 2,026 | 1.15 | – | 545 | 0.31 | – | 39,754 | 22.52 | −19.75 | 176,551 | WY |
| TOTALS: | 538 | 48,886,597 | 53.37 | 426 | 41,809,476 | 45.65 | 111 | 431,750 | 0.47 | – | 217,221 | 0.24 | – | 7,077,121 | 7.73 | −10.49 | 91,594,686 | US |

Maine allowed its electoral votes to be split between candidates. Two electoral votes were awarded to the winner of the statewide race and one electoral vote to the winner of each congressional district. Bush won all four votes. This was the last election in which Nebraska awarded its electors in a winner-take-all format before switching to the congressional district method.

==== States that flipped from Republican to Democratic ====
- Hawaii
- Iowa
- Massachusetts
- New York
- Oregon
- Rhode Island
- Washington
- West Virginia
- Wisconsin

=== Close states ===
States with margin of victory less than 5% (195 electoral votes)

1. Washington, 1.59% (29,681 votes)
2. Illinois, 2.09% (94,999 votes)
3. Pennsylvania, 2.31% (105,143 votes)
4. Maryland, 2.91% (49,863 votes)
5. Vermont, 3.52% (8,556 votes)
6. California, 3.57% (352,684 votes)
7. Wisconsin, 3.61% (79,295 votes)
8. Missouri, 3.98% (83,334 votes)
9. New York, 4.10% (266,011 votes)
10. Oregon, 4.67% (56,080 votes)
11. West Virginia, 4.74% (30,951 votes)
12. New Mexico, 4.96% (25,844 votes)

States with margin of victory between 5% and 10% (70 electoral votes):

1. Connecticut, 5.11% (73,657 votes)
2. Montana, 5.87% (21,476 votes)
3. South Dakota, 6.34% (19,855 votes)
4. Minnesota, 7.01% (147,134 votes)
5. Colorado, 7.78% (106,724 votes)
6. Massachusetts, 7.85% (206,762 votes)
7. Michigan, 7.90% (289,703 votes) (tipping point state)
8. Hawaii, 9.52% (33,739 votes)

==== Statistics ====
Counties with highest percent of vote (Republican)

1. Jackson County, Kentucky 85.16%
2. Madison County, Idaho 84.87%
3. Ochiltree County, Texas 83.25%
4. Blaine County, Nebraska 82.24%
5. Thomas County, Nebraska 82.19%

Counties with highest percent of vote (Democratic)

1. Starr County, Texas 84.74%
2. Zavala County, Texas 84.02%
3. Washington, D.C. 82.65%
4. Duval County, Texas 81.95%
5. Brooks County, Texas 81.94%

=== Maps ===
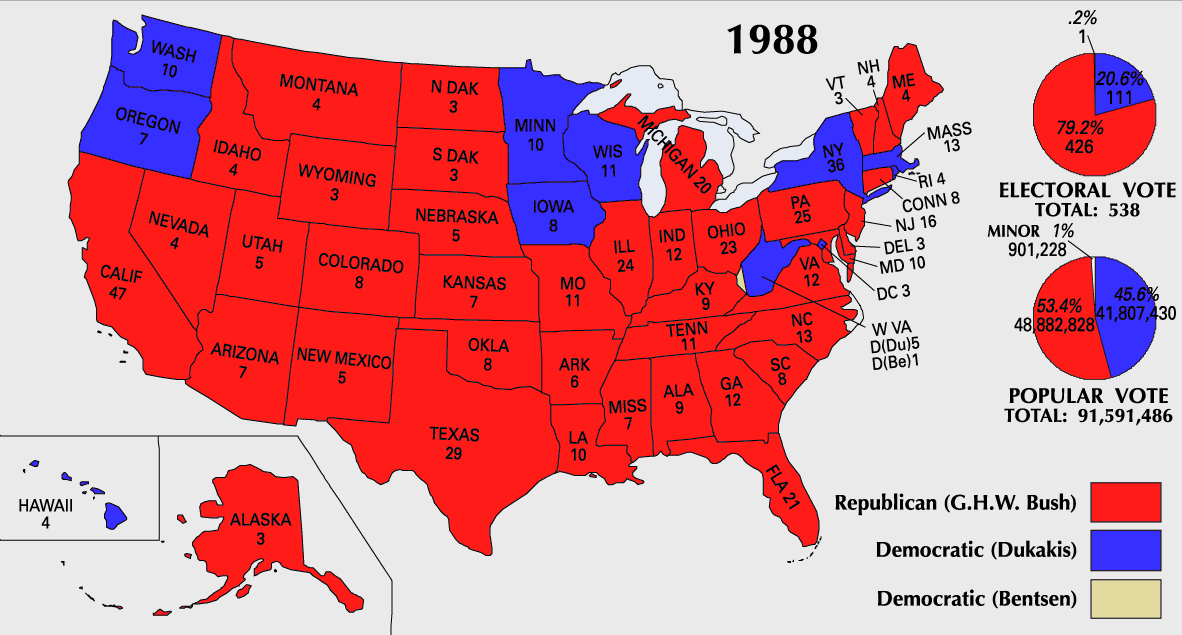

Results by congressional district, shaded according to winning candidate's percentage of the vote

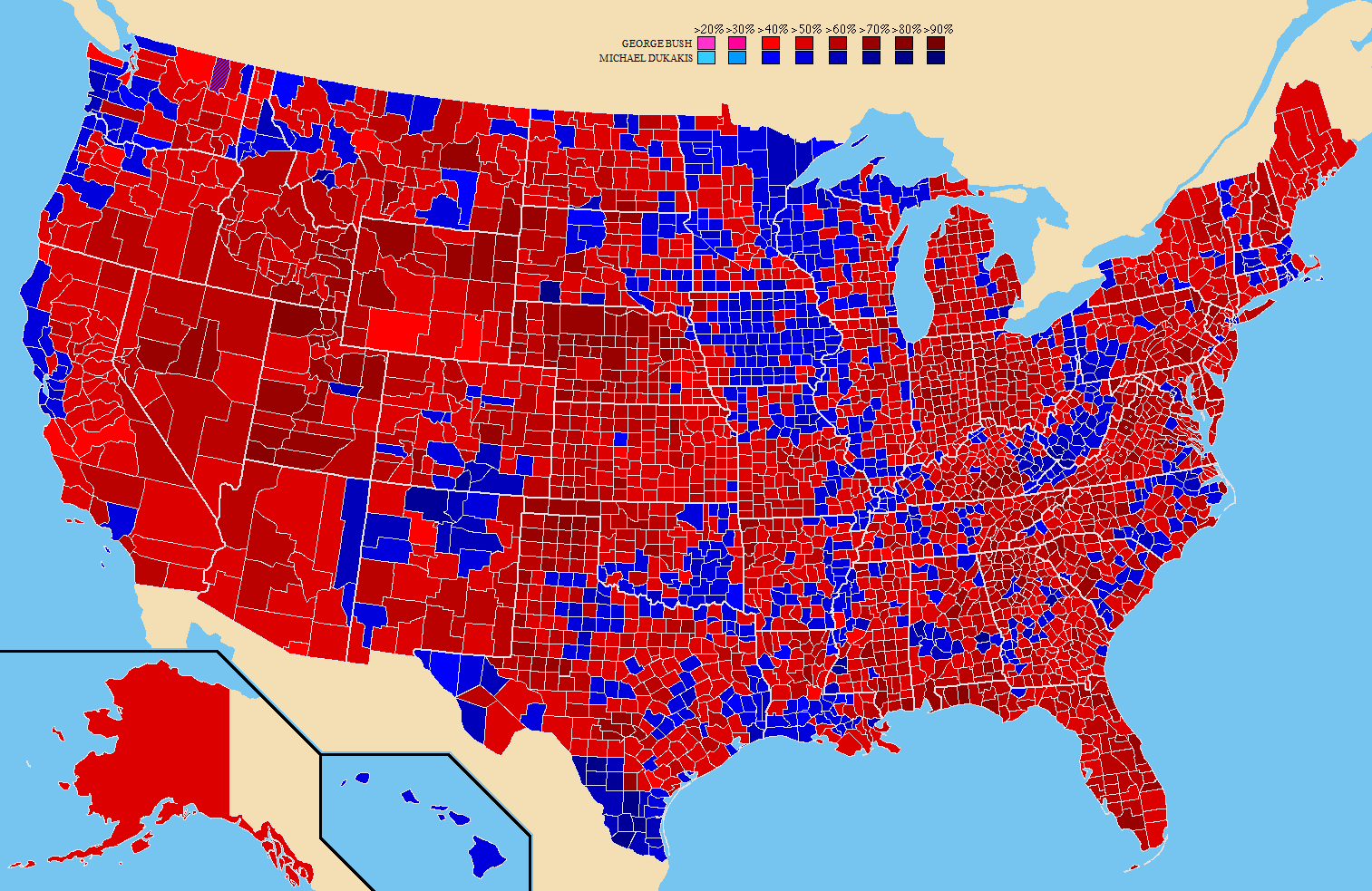
Election results by county
George H. W. Bush
Michael Dukakis

Results by county, shaded according to winning candidate's percentage of the vote

County swing from 1984 to 1988

== Voter demographics ==
The 1988 presidential vote by demographic subgroup
| Demographic subgroup | Dukakis | Bush | % of total vote |
|---|---|---|---|
| Total vote | 46 | 53 | 100 |
Ideology
| Liberals | 81 | 18 | 20 |
| Moderates | 51 | 49 | 45 |
| Conservatives | 19 | 81 | 33 |
Party
| Democrats | 83 | 17 | 37 |
| Republicans | 8 | 92 | 35 |
| Independents | 42 | 56 | 26 |
Gender
| Men | 42 | 57 | 48 |
| Women | 49 | 50 | 52 |
Race
| White | 40 | 59 | 85 |
| Black | 89 | 11 | 10 |
| Hispanic | 69 | 30 | 3 |
Age
| 18–29 years old | 47 | 53 | 20 |
| 30–44 years old | 46 | 54 | 35 |
| 45–59 years old | 42 | 58 | 22 |
| 60 and older | 49 | 51 | 22 |
Family income
| Under $12,500 | 63 | 37 | 12 |
| $12,500–25,000 | 43 | 56 | 20 |
| $25,000–35,000 | 43 | 56 | 20 |
| $35,000–50,000 | 42 | 57 | 20 |
| $50,000–100,000 | 38 | 61 | 19 |
| Over $100,000 | 33 | 66 | 5 |
Region
| East | 49 | 50 | 25 |
| Midwest | 47 | 52 | 28 |
| South | 41 | 59 | 28 |
| West | 46 | 53 | 19 |
Union households
| Union | 57 | 43 | 25 |

Source: CBS News and The New York Times exit poll from the Roper Center for Public Opinion Research (11,645 surveyed)

== See also ==
- 1988 United States House of Representatives elections
- 1988 United States Senate elections
- 1988 United States gubernatorial elections
- Al Gore 1988 presidential campaign
- History of the United States (1991–2016)
- Inauguration of George H. W. Bush
