= 1988 New Hampshire Republican presidential primary =

- February 16, 1988

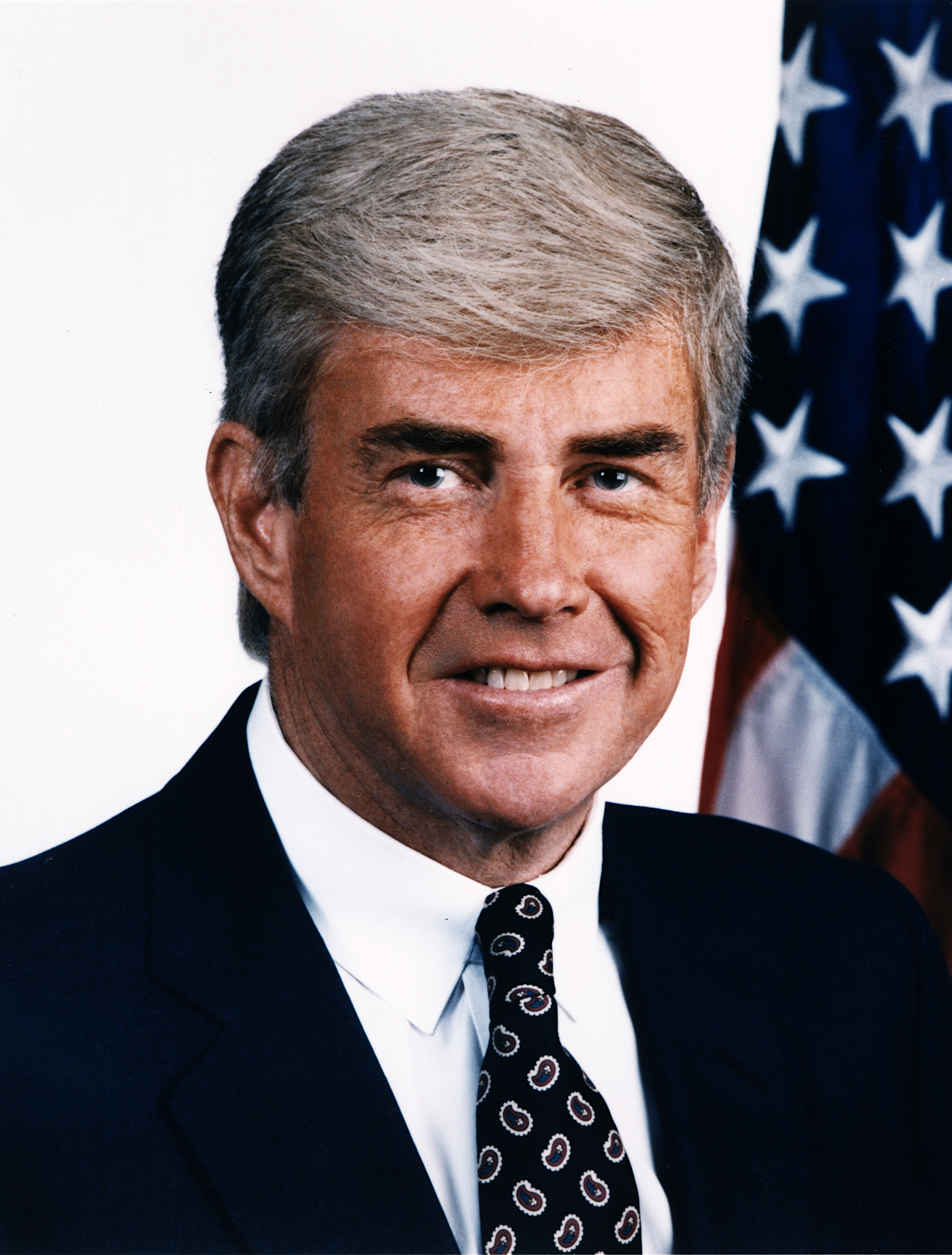

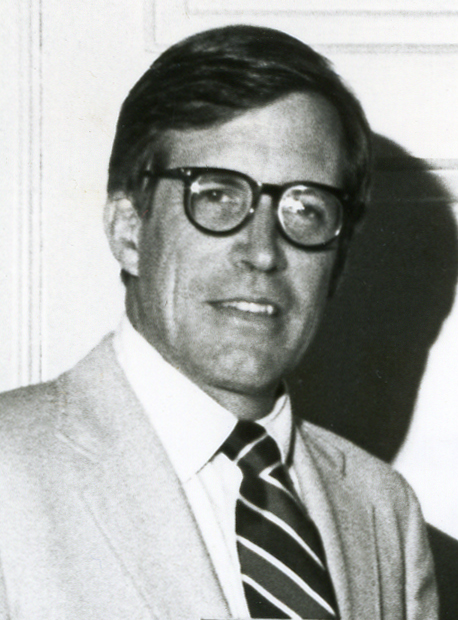

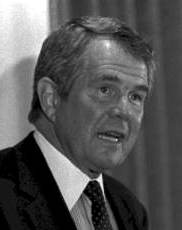
Candidate	George H. W. Bush	Bob Dole	Jack Kemp
Home state	Texas	Kansas	New York
Popular vote	59,290	44,797	20,114
Percentage	37.7%	28.5%	12.8%
Candidate	Pete du Pont	Pat Robertson
Home state	Delaware	Virginia
Popular vote	15,885	14,775
Percentage	10.1%	9.4%
- County results Bush: 30-40% 40-50% Dole: 30-40%

The 1988 New Hampshire Republican presidential primary took place on February 16, 1988, as one of the Republican Party's statewide nomination contests ahead of the 1988 United States presidential election. George H. W. Bush won with 37.7% of the vote, finishing 9.2 percentage points ahead of his nearest competitor, Bob Dole.

== Details ==
After being dealt a crushing third pace finish in the Iowa Caucuses behind Kansas senator Bob Dole and televangelist Pat Robertson, Vice President George H. W. Bush appeared to be in trouble. His momentum had collapsed after falling short in a state he won in 1980, and his lead in new Hampshire had collapsed. However, the Bush campaign responded by running television commercials portraying Dole as a tax raiser, while Governor John H. Sununu stumped for Bush - enabling a victory by the incumbent Vice President.

Regaining footing with his win in New Hampshire, Bush's organizational strength and fundraising lead were impossible for the other candidates to match as the primaries went into multiple states across the country. Bush was resoundingly elected as the Republican nominee, and went on to win the general election against Democrat Michael Dukakis.
