= 1988 United States presidential election in Iowa =

- November 8, 1988

Nominee	Michael Dukakis	George H. W. Bush
Party	Democratic	Republican
Home state	Massachusetts	Texas
Running mate	Lloyd Bentsen	Dan Quayle
Electoral vote	8	0
Popular vote	670,557	545,355
Percentage	54.71%	44.50%

Bush
50–60%
60–70%
70–80%
80–90%
90–100%
Dukakis
50–60%
60–70%
70–80%
80–90%
90–100%
President before election
Ronald Reagan
Republican
Elected President
George H. W. Bush
Republican

The 1988 United States presidential election in Iowa took place on November 8, 1988, as part of the 1988 United States presidential election. Voters chose eight representatives, or electors, to the Electoral College, who voted for president and vice president.

Iowa was won by Democratic Governor Michael Dukakis of Massachusetts with 54.71% of the popular vote over Republican Vice President George H. W. Bush's 44.50%, a victory margin of 10.21%, which made Iowa exactly 18% more Democratic than the nation at large. A major reason why it voted so Democratic compared to the rest of the nation was the 1980s farm crisis. This made it one of 10 states (along with the District of Columbia) to vote for Dukakis, while Bush won a convincing electoral victory nationwide. Bush became the first Republican to ever win the presidency without carrying Iowa, a feat that would only be repeated once more, when his son George W. Bush lost the state in 2000 but won the national election by extremely narrow margins. George W. Bush would later carry the state in 2004, which made George H.W. Bush the only Republican to win the presidency without ever winning the state, as well as the only Republican to have ever won the national popular vote without winning the state. Dukakis was also the first Democratic presidential candidate to carry the state since Lyndon B. Johnson's landslide victory in 1964.

The state would not vote for the losing candidate again until 2000, the loser of the popular vote until 2016, and the loser of both the popular and electoral vote until 2020. Dukakis remains the last Democratic nominee to win Iowa but lose the popular vote.

== Background ==
The farm crisis of the 1980s under the Reagan administration made the Midwest one of the targets for the Dukakis campaign in 1988, which ultimately proved successful in the region with Democrats performing strongly in many farm states. Nowhere was this more evident than in Iowa, which was the second most Democratic state in the nation in 1988 in terms of both vote percentage and victory margin; it was one of just two states (along with Rhode Island) to vote Democratic by a double-digit margin. This Democratic support was spread widely across the state, with Dukakis winning 75 of the state's 99 counties, whilst counties carried by Bush were concentrated within the state's typically archconservative western fringe. Iowa was also the only state in the nation where Dukakis won by a larger margin than fellow Democrat Bill Clinton would win it by four years later in 1992; Dukakis won 13 Iowa counties which would vote for Bush in 1992.

While Dukakis personally overperformed in Iowa due to the farm crisis, 1988 was also the beginning of a relatively long-term re-alignment of the state toward the Democratic Party, as the historically Republican state became a Democratic leaning swing state for a quarter of a century. Iowa had voted Republican in the five preceding elections, and nine of the previous eleven. From 1988 to 2012, Iowa voted Democratic in six of the seven elections that followed (out of the nine total elections overall), although starting in 2016, the state again became reliably Republican. Despite this, as of the 2024 presidential election, this is the last election in which Marion County, Buena Vista County, Sac County, and Humboldt County voted for a Democratic presidential candidate.

Iowa (with four counties), Texas (with three), and Montana (with one) are the only states containing counties that Dukakis (as of 2024) was the last Democrat to carry.

As of the 2024 U.S. presidential election, this is the last time Iowa voted to the left of many modern-day blue or blue-leaning states, including California, Connecticut, Hawaii, neighboring Illinois, neighboring Minnesota, Maine, Maryland, Massachusetts, New Jersey, New York, Washington state, and Vermont.

== Results ==
1988 United States presidential election in Iowa
Party	Candidate	Votes	Percentage	Electoral votes
Democratic	Michael Dukakis	670,557	54.71%	8
Republican	George H. W. Bush	545,355	44.50%	0
Independent	Lyndon LaRouche	3,526	0.29%	0
Libertarian	Ron Paul	2,494	0.20%	0
N/A	Write-ins	1,613	0.13%	0
America First	David Duke	755 (Note: Votes for this candidate were not separated by county and only given as a state-wide total.)	0.06%	0
New Alliance	Lenora Fulani	540	0.04%	0
Socialist	Willa Kenoyer	334	0.03%	0
Socialist Equality	Edward Winn	235	0.02%	0
Socialist Workers	James Warren	205	0.02%	0
Totals		1,225,614	100.00%	8
Voter turnout (voting age/registered)				59%/73%

=== Results by county ===
County	Michael Dukakis Democratic		George H.W. Bush Republican		Lyndon LaRouche Independent		Ron Paul Libertarian		Various candidates Other parties		Margin		Total votes cast
County	#	%	#	%	#	%	#	%	#	%	#	%	Total votes cast
Adair	2,261	54.84%	1,833	44.46%	7	0.17%	5	0.12%	17	0.41%	428	10.38%	4,123
Adams	1,283	53.91%	1,080	45.38%	4	0.17%	5	0.21%	8	0.34%	203	8.53%	2,380
Allamakee	2,768	46.17%	3,186	53.14%	12	0.20%	11	0.18%	18	0.30%	-418	-6.97%	5,995
Appanoose	3,209	52.71%	2,779	45.65%	62	1.02%	15	0.25%	23	0.38%	430	7.06%	6,088
Audubon	1,863	55.27%	1,478	43.84%	16	0.47%	4	0.12%	10	0.30%	385	11.43%	3,371
Benton	5,873	58.87%	4,011	40.20%	44	0.44%	15	0.15%	34	0.34%	1,862	18.67%	9,977
Black Hawk	31,657	56.36%	24,112	42.93%	143	0.25%	82	0.15%	177	0.32%	7,545	13.43%	56,171
Boone	7,232	61.89%	4,381	37.49%	44	0.38%	11	0.09%	18	0.15%	2,851	24.40%	11,686
Bremer	4,961	49.12%	5,079	50.29%	24	0.24%	18	0.18%	17	0.17%	-118	-1.17%	10,099
Buchanan	4,778	57.42%	3,495	42.00%	6	0.07%	15	0.18%	27	0.32%	1,283	15.42%	8,321
Buena Vista	4,580	51.90%	4,170	47.25%	16	0.18%	35	0.40%	24	0.27%	410	4.65%	8,825
Butler	2,593	42.19%	3,523	57.32%	12	0.20%	6	0.10%	12	0.20%	-930	-15.13%	6,146
Calhoun	2,990	54.31%	2,474	44.94%	15	0.27%	14	0.25%	12	0.22%	516	9.37%	5,505
Carroll	5,437	58.63%	3,701	39.91%	79	0.85%	22	0.24%	34	0.37%	1,736	18.72%	9,273
Cass	2,934	42.11%	3,962	56.86%	43	0.62%	12	0.17%	17	0.24%	-1,028	-14.75%	6,968
Cedar	4,032	53.91%	3,373	45.10%	10	0.13%	16	0.21%	48	0.64%	659	8.81%	7,479
Cerro Gordo	12,857	57.49%	9,358	41.84%	74	0.33%	36	0.16%	40	0.18%	3,499	15.65%	22,365
Cherokee	3,574	52.14%	3,218	46.94%	26	0.38%	15	0.22%	22	0.32%	356	5.20%	6,855
Chickasaw	3,530	57.53%	2,549	41.54%	25	0.41%	6	0.10%	26	0.42%	981	15.99%	6,136
Clarke	2,262	57.50%	1,631	41.46%	3	0.08%	1	0.03%	37	0.94%	631	16.04%	3,934
Clay	4,173	53.02%	3,641	46.26%	30	0.38%	13	0.17%	13	0.17%	532	6.76%	7,870
Clayton	4,320	52.41%	3,839	46.58%	30	0.36%	18	0.22%	35	0.42%	481	5.83%	8,242
Clinton	12,549	54.56%	10,243	44.53%	116	0.50%	55	0.24%	39	0.17%	2,306	10.03%	23,002
Crawford	3,868	52.91%	3,375	46.16%	28	0.38%	21	0.29%	19	0.26%	493	6.75%	7,311
Dallas	7,501	60.40%	4,858	39.12%	6	0.05%	19	0.15%	35	0.28%	2,643	21.28%	12,419
Davis	2,246	58.35%	1,563	40.61%	12	0.31%	7	0.18%	21	0.55%	683	17.74%	3,849
Decatur	2,192	60.44%	1,406	38.76%	4	0.11%	9	0.25%	16	0.44%	786	21.68%	3,627
Delaware	3,947	53.11%	3,425	46.08%	26	0.35%	11	0.15%	23	0.31%	522	7.03%	7,432
Des Moines	11,593	59.84%	7,652	39.50%	62	0.32%	26	0.13%	41	0.21%	3,941	20.34%	19,374
Dickinson	3,342	47.06%	3,678	51.80%	41	0.58%	19	0.27%	21	0.30%	-336	-4.74%	7,101
Dubuque	23,797	61.74%	14,530	37.69%	88	0.23%	60	0.16%	72	0.19%	9,267	24.05%	38,547
Emmet	2,778	55.82%	2,173	43.66%	9	0.18%	12	0.24%	5	0.10%	605	12.16%	4,977
Fayette	5,304	51.56%	4,921	47.84%	17	0.17%	30	0.29%	15	0.15%	383	3.72%	10,287
Floyd	4,377	56.60%	3,266	42.23%	53	0.69%	11	0.14%	26	0.34%	1,111	14.37%	7,733
Franklin	2,594	52.39%	2,320	46.86%	21	0.42%	9	0.18%	7	0.14%	274	5.53%	4,951
Fremont	1,547	43.86%	1,946	55.17%	18	0.51%	5	0.14%	11	0.31%	-399	-11.31%	3,527
Greene	3,011	58.31%	2,091	40.49%	32	0.62%	10	0.19%	20	0.39%	920	17.82%	5,164
Grundy	2,211	38.91%	3,433	60.42%	19	0.33%	10	0.18%	9	0.16%	-1,222	-21.51%	5,682
Guthrie	2,910	58.40%	2,005	40.24%	35	0.70%	23	0.46%	10	0.20%	905	18.16%	4,983
Hamilton	4,156	55.46%	3,277	43.73%	23	0.31%	14	0.19%	24	0.32%	879	11.73%	7,494
Hancock	2,831	50.62%	2,731	48.83%	17	0.30%	6	0.11%	8	0.14%	100	1.79%	5,593
Hardin	5,088	56.53%	3,856	42.84%	14	0.16%	18	0.20%	25	0.28%	1,232	13.69%	9,001
Harrison	2,883	47.83%	3,108	51.57%	7	0.12%	8	0.13%	21	0.35%	-225	-3.74%	6,027
Henry	3,754	48.39%	3,951	50.93%	9	0.12%	18	0.23%	26	0.34%	-197	-2.54%	7,758
Howard	2,330	53.87%	1,970	45.55%	5	0.12%	3	0.07%	17	0.39%	360	8.32%	4,325
Humboldt	2,713	50.64%	2,594	48.42%	31	0.58%	9	0.17%	10	0.19%	119	2.22%	5,357
Ida	1,787	47.29%	1,951	51.63%	19	0.50%	11	0.29%	11	0.29%	-164	-4.34%	3,779
Iowa	3,338	49.93%	3,247	48.57%	42	0.63%	21	0.31%	37	0.55%	91	1.36%	6,685
Jackson	4,864	59.08%	3,237	39.32%	102	1.24%	22	0.27%	8	0.10%	1,627	19.76%	8,233
Jasper	8,940	56.82%	6,703	42.60%	20	0.13%	22	0.14%	48	0.31%	2,237	14.22%	15,733
Jefferson	3,594	49.26%	3,614	49.53%	8	0.11%	40	0.55%	40	0.55%	-20	-0.27%	7,296
Johnson	28,759	64.41%	15,453	34.61%	22	0.05%	149	0.33%	264	0.59%	13,306	29.80%	44,647
Jones	4,641	56.70%	3,496	42.71%	5	0.06%	8	0.10%	35	0.43%	1,145	13.99%	8,185
Keokuk	2,899	55.43%	2,278	43.56%	29	0.55%	12	0.23%	12	0.23%	621	11.87%	5,230
Kossuth	5,088	55.87%	3,938	43.24%	60	0.66%	13	0.14%	8	0.09%	1,150	12.63%	9,107
Lee	10,911	63.11%	6,228	36.02%	89	0.51%	41	0.24%	21	0.12%	4,683	27.09%	17,290
Linn	42,993	56.04%	33,129	43.18%	57	0.07%	178	0.23%	361	0.47%	9,864	12.86%	76,718
Louisa	2,268	51.78%	2,060	47.03%	10	0.23%	15	0.34%	27	0.62%	208	4.75%	4,380
Lucas	2,454	57.84%	1,776	41.86%	2	0.05%	3	0.07%	8	0.19%	678	15.98%	4,243
Lyon	1,706	32.41%	3,517	66.81%	26	0.49%	8	0.15%	7	0.13%	-1,811	-34.40%	5,264
Madison	3,421	58.36%	2,410	41.11%	8	0.14%	8	0.14%	15	0.26%	1,011	17.25%	5,862
Mahaska	4,451	47.76%	4,798	51.48%	41	0.44%	16	0.17%	14	0.15%	-347	-3.72%	9,320
Marion	6,922	53.44%	5,914	45.65%	83	0.64%	9	0.07%	26	0.20%	1,008	7.79%	12,954
Marshall	9,760	55.62%	7,657	43.63%	21	0.12%	41	0.23%	70	0.40%	2,103	11.99%	17,549
Mills	2,092	38.96%	3,212	59.82%	27	0.50%	25	0.47%	13	0.24%	-1,120	-20.86%	5,369
Mitchell	2,870	54.66%	2,338	44.52%	27	0.51%	7	0.13%	9	0.17%	532	10.14%	5,251
Monona	2,408	53.62%	2,068	46.05%	4	0.09%	2	0.04%	9	0.20%	340	7.57%	4,491
Monroe	2,338	63.76%	1,313	35.81%	4	0.11%	4	0.11%	8	0.22%	1,025	27.95%	3,667
Montgomery	1,898	37.22%	3,166	62.08%	18	0.35%	8	0.16%	10	0.20%	-1,268	-24.86%	5,100
Muscatine	7,059	50.06%	6,904	48.96%	78	0.55%	29	0.21%	32	0.23%	155	1.10%	14,102
O'Brien	2,768	39.14%	4,241	59.97%	29	0.41%	18	0.25%	16	0.23%	-1,473	-20.83%	7,072
Osceola	1,277	39.12%	1,951	59.77%	15	0.46%	4	0.12%	17	0.52%	-674	-20.65%	3,264
Page	2,185	32.12%	4,583	67.37%	9	0.13%	7	0.10%	19	0.28%	-2,398	-35.25%	6,803
Palo Alto	3,377	61.82%	2,041	37.36%	29	0.53%	5	0.09%	11	0.20%	1,336	24.46%	5,463
Plymouth	4,220	43.93%	5,316	55.33%	34	0.35%	22	0.23%	15	0.16%	-1,096	-11.40%	9,607
Pocahontas	2,722	58.51%	1,871	40.22%	22	0.47%	24	0.52%	13	0.28%	851	18.29%	4,652
Polk	84,476	59.01%	57,854	40.42%	71	0.05%	282	0.20%	461	0.32%	26,622	18.59%	143,144
Pottawattamie	14,958	46.16%	17,193	53.06%	136	0.42%	57	0.18%	61	0.19%	-2,235	-6.90%	32,405
Poweshiek	4,876	56.53%	3,683	42.70%	17	0.20%	26	0.30%	23	0.27%	1,193	13.83%	8,625
Ringgold	1,609	58.92%	1,110	40.64%	3	0.11%	1	0.04%	8	0.29%	499	18.28%	2,731
Sac	2,613	51.47%	2,411	47.49%	21	0.41%	14	0.28%	18	0.35%	202	3.98%	5,077
Scott	34,415	52.12%	31,025	46.98%	249	0.38%	188	0.28%	158	0.24%	3,390	5.14%	66,035
Shelby	2,806	47.88%	3,019	51.52%	9	0.15%	12	0.20%	14	0.24%	-213	-3.64%	5,860
Sioux	2,923	22.00%	10,270	77.29%	49	0.37%	12	0.09%	34	0.26%	-7,347	-55.29%	13,288
Story	19,051	57.55%	13,782	41.63%	73	0.22%	92	0.28%	107	0.32%	5,269	15.92%	33,105
Tama	4,584	57.21%	3,362	41.96%	20	0.25%	21	0.26%	25	0.31%	1,222	15.25%	8,012
Taylor	1,671	50.15%	1,647	49.43%	1	0.03%	1	0.03%	12	0.36%	24	0.72%	3,332
Union	3,236	53.57%	2,751	45.54%	31	0.51%	9	0.15%	14	0.23%	485	8.03%	6,041
Van Buren	1,612	48.35%	1,692	50.75%	6	0.18%	9	0.27%	15	0.45%	-80	-2.40%	3,334
Wapello	10,177	64.93%	5,350	34.14%	90	0.57%	24	0.15%	32	0.20%	4,827	30.79%	15,673
Warren	9,627	59.68%	6,424	39.82%	30	0.19%	14	0.09%	36	0.22%	3,203	19.86%	16,131
Washington	3,776	49.58%	3,741	49.12%	49	0.64%	28	0.37%	22	0.29%	35	0.46%	7,616
Wayne	1,988	57.18%	1,467	42.19%	6	0.17%	16	0.46%	0	0.00%	521	14.99%	3,477
Webster	10,267	59.03%	6,926	39.82%	121	0.70%	26	0.15%	53	0.30%	3,341	19.21%	17,393
Winnebago	2,804	49.17%	2,863	50.20%	11	0.19%	7	0.12%	18	0.32%	-59	-1.03%	5,703
Winneshiek	4,443	50.92%	4,194	48.07%	28	0.32%	25	0.29%	35	0.40%	249	2.85%	8,725
Woodbury	20,153	51.38%	18,790	47.90%	136	0.35%	56	0.14%	90	0.23%	1,363	3.48%	39,225
Worth	2,440	61.28%	1,488	37.37%	3	0.08%	9	0.23%	42	1.05%	952	23.91%	3,982
Wright	3,353	55.38%	2,658	43.90%	8	0.13%	21	0.35%	14	0.23%	695	11.48%	6,054
Totals	670,557	54.71%	545,355	44.50%	3,526	0.29%	2,494	0.20%	3,682	0.30%	125,202	10.21%	1,225,614

==== Counties that flipped from Republican to Democratic ====
- Adair
- Adams
- Appanoose
- Audubon
- Benton
- Black Hawk
- Buchanan
- Buena Vista
- Calhoun
- Carroll
- Cedar
- Cherokee
- Chickasaw
- Clarke
- Clay
- Clayton
- Clinton
- Crawford
- Decatur
- Delaware
- Emmet
- Fayette
- Floyd
- Franklin
- Guthrie
- Hamilton
- Hancock
- Hardin
- Howard
- Humboldt
- Iowa
- Jackson
- Jasper
- Jones
- Keokuk
- Kossuth
- Linn
- Lousia
- Lucas
- Madison
- Marion
- Marshall
- Mitchell
- Monona
- Muscatine
- Pocahontas
- Poweshiek
- Sac
- Scott
- Story
- Tama
- Taylor
- Union
- Warren
- Washington
- Wayne
- Winneshiek
- Woodbury
- Wright

== See also ==
- United States presidential elections in Iowa
