= 1988 United States presidential election in Minnesota =

- November 8, 1988
- Turnout: 68.84% (▼2.1 pp)

Nominee	Michael Dukakis	George H. W. Bush
Party	Democratic (DFL)	Ind.-Republican
Home state	Massachusetts	Texas
Running mate	Lloyd Bentsen	Dan Quayle
Electoral vote	10	0
Popular vote	1,109,471	962,337
Percentage	52.91%	45.90%

Dukakis
40–50%
50–60%
60–70%
70–80%
80–90%
90–100%
Bush
40–50%
50–60%
60–70%
70–80%
80–90%
90–100%
Other
Tie
No vote
President before election
Ronald Reagan
Republican
Elected President
George H. W. Bush
Republican

The 1988 United States presidential election in Minnesota took place on November 8, 1988, as part of the 1988 United States presidential election. Voters chose ten representatives, or electors to the Electoral College, who voted for president and vice president. Minnesota was won by Democrat Michael Dukakis, Governor of Massachusetts, with 52.91% of the popular vote over Republican Vice President George H. W. Bush's 45.90%, a victory margin of 7.01%. This made Minnesota roughly 14.8% more Democratic than the nation at large.

Four years earlier Minnesota had been the only state in the entire country to vote for Democrat Walter Mondale over Republican Ronald Reagan, and this Democratic strength in the state endured in 1988, as Minnesota chose Michael Dukakis by a comfortable margin despite George H.W. Bush winning a convincing victory nationwide. Minnesota has the longest streak of voting Democratic of any state, having not voted Republican since 1972. Fillmore and Winona counties would not vote Republican again until 2016.

As of the 2024 U.S. presidential election, this is the last time Minnesota voted to the right of neighboring Iowa, as well as the last time in which Clay County voted for a losing presidential candidate, a streak it would hold until it voted for Kamala Harris in 2024.

== Results ==
1988 United States presidential election in Minnesota
Party	Candidate	Votes	Percentage	Electoral votes
Democratic (DFL)	Michael Dukakis	1,109,471	52.91%	10
Republican	George H. W. Bush	962,337	45.90%	0
MN Progressive	Eugene McCarthy	5,403	0.26%	0
Libertarian	Ron Paul	5,109	0.24%	0
Write-in	Write-ins	3,614	0.17%	0
Socialist Workers	James Warren	2,155	0.10%	0
Grassroots	Jack Herer	1,949	0.09%	0
New Alliance	Lenora Fulani	1,734	0.08%	0
Democrats for Economic Recovery	Lyndon LaRouche	1,702	0.08%	0
America First	David Duke	1,529	0.07%	0
American	Delmar Dennis	1,298	0.06%	0
Workers League	Edward Winn	489	0.02%	0
Totals		2,096,790	100.0%	10

=== Results by county ===
County	Michael Dukakis DFL		George H.W. Bush Republican		Various candidates Other parties		Margin		Total votes cast
County	#	%	#	%	#	%	#	%	Total votes cast
Aitkin	3,863	55.65%	3,011	43.37%	68	0.98%	852	12.28%	6,942
Anoka	57,953	54.77%	46,853	44.28%	1,003	0.95%	11,100	10.49%	105,809
Becker	5,787	45.74%	6,738	53.26%	126	1.00%	-951	-7.52%	12,651
Beltrami	7,566	52.61%	6,652	46.26%	162	1.13%	914	6.35%	14,380
Benton	5,861	48.68%	6,060	50.33%	119	0.99%	-199	-1.65%	12,040
Big Stone	2,026	57.46%	1,469	41.66%	31	0.88%	557	15.80%	3,526
Blue Earth	12,375	50.40%	11,959	48.71%	218	0.89%	416	1.69%	24,552
Brown	5,109	41.97%	6,898	56.67%	166	1.36%	-1,789	-14.70%	12,173
Carlton	8,790	64.82%	4,626	34.12%	144	1.06%	4,164	30.70%	13,560
Carver	8,439	39.75%	12,560	59.17%	229	1.08%	-4,121	-19.42%	21,228
Cass	5,127	46.11%	5,895	53.02%	97	0.87%	-768	-6.91%	11,119
Chippewa	3,238	49.71%	3,190	48.97%	86	1.32%	48	0.74%	6,514
Chisago	7,875	55.58%	6,163	43.49%	132	0.93%	1,712	12.09%	14,170
Clay	11,186	51.54%	10,380	47.82%	139	0.64%	806	3.72%	21,705
Clearwater	1,769	49.59%	1,763	49.43%	35	0.98%	6	0.16%	3,567
Cook	1,080	49.45%	1,078	49.36%	26	1.19%	2	0.09%	2,184
Cottonwood	3,095	47.29%	3,390	51.80%	60	0.92%	-295	-4.51%	6,545
Crow Wing	9,674	46.26%	11,017	52.69%	220	1.05%	-1,343	-6.43%	20,911
Dakota	61,942	49.72%	61,606	49.45%	1,032	0.83%	336	0.27%	124,580
Dodge	2,925	42.73%	3,848	56.21%	73	1.07%	-923	-13.48%	6,846
Douglas	5,803	41.89%	7,898	57.02%	151	1.09%	-2,095	-15.13%	13,852
Faribault	3,879	44.08%	4,846	55.07%	75	0.85%	-967	-10.99%	8,800
Fillmore	4,114	44.72%	5,004	54.39%	82	0.89%	-890	-9.67%	9,200
Freeborn	8,836	54.48%	7,226	44.56%	156	0.96%	1,610	9.92%	16,218
Goodhue	9,438	49.41%	9,455	49.50%	209	1.09%	-17	-0.09%	19,102
Grant	1,950	53.03%	1,693	46.04%	34	0.92%	257	6.99%	3,677
Hennepin	292,909	54.39%	240,209	44.60%	5,444	1.01%	52,700	9.79%	538,562
Houston	3,936	44.60%	4,777	54.13%	112	1.27%	-841	-9.53%	8,825
Hubbard	3,306	42.74%	4,365	56.42%	65	0.84%	-1,059	-13.68%	7,736
Isanti	6,075	53.05%	5,246	45.81%	131	1.14%	829	7.24%	11,452
Itasca	10,517	55.20%	8,358	43.87%	178	0.93%	2,159	11.33%	19,053
Jackson	3,275	54.96%	2,629	44.12%	55	0.92%	646	10.84%	5,959
Kanabec	2,970	53.05%	2,571	45.93%	57	1.02%	399	7.12%	5,598
Kandiyohi	8,962	50.17%	8,634	48.34%	266	1.49%	328	1.83%	17,862
Kittson	1,650	53.97%	1,381	45.18%	26	0.85%	269	8.79%	3,057
Koochiching	3,867	57.04%	2,842	41.92%	71	1.05%	1,025	15.12%	6,780
Lac qui Parle	2,805	56.29%	2,116	42.46%	62	1.24%	689	13.83%	4,983
Lake	3,887	67.31%	1,838	31.83%	50	0.87%	2,049	35.48%	5,775
Lake of the Woods	798	43.99%	984	54.24%	32	1.76%	-186	-10.25%	1,814
Le Sueur	5,410	49.52%	5,415	49.57%	100	0.92%	-5	-0.05%	10,925
Lincoln	1,891	55.21%	1,479	43.18%	55	1.61%	412	12.03%	3,425
Lyon	5,657	48.20%	5,969	50.86%	110	0.94%	-312	-2.66%	11,736
Mahnomen	1,277	54.16%	1,051	44.57%	30	1.27%	226	9.59%	2,358
Marshall	3,001	51.64%	2,752	47.36%	58	1.00%	249	4.28%	5,811
Martin	4,922	45.87%	5,724	53.34%	85	0.79%	-802	-7.47%	10,731
McLeod	5,736	41.38%	7,967	57.47%	159	1.15%	-2,231	-16.09%	13,862
Meeker	4,544	46.81%	4,999	51.50%	164	1.69%	-455	-4.69%	9,707
Mille Lacs	4,327	52.13%	3,862	46.52%	112	1.35%	465	5.61%	8,301
Morrison	6,469	48.91%	6,598	49.88%	160	1.21%	-129	-0.97%	13,227
Mower	11,893	62.51%	6,969	36.63%	163	0.86%	4,924	25.88%	19,025
Murray	2,840	54.49%	2,316	44.44%	56	1.07%	524	10.05%	5,212
Nicollet	6,786	49.25%	6,878	49.92%	115	0.83%	-92	-0.67%	13,779
Nobles	4,953	52.73%	4,348	46.28%	93	0.99%	605	6.45%	9,394
Norman	2,149	54.32%	1,789	45.22%	18	0.46%	360	9.10%	3,956
Olmsted	19,423	40.89%	27,683	58.28%	398	0.84%	-8,260	-17.39%	47,504
Otter Tail	10,373	42.16%	14,015	56.96%	216	0.88%	-3,642	-14.80%	24,604
Pennington	3,105	51.14%	2,920	48.10%	46	0.76%	185	3.04%	6,071
Pine	5,540	58.24%	3,857	40.54%	116	1.22%	1,683	17.70%	9,513
Pipestone	2,382	45.90%	2,760	53.19%	47	0.91%	-378	-7.29%	5,189
Polk	7,523	51.31%	7,032	47.96%	107	0.73%	491	3.35%	14,662
Pope	3,074	53.22%	2,627	45.48%	75	1.30%	447	7.74%	5,776
Ramsey	143,767	61.20%	88,736	37.78%	2,393	1.02%	55,031	23.42%	234,896
Red Lake	1,229	56.51%	918	42.21%	28	1.29%	311	14.30%	2,175
Redwood	3,178	38.02%	5,076	60.73%	104	1.24%	-1,898	-22.71%	8,358
Renville	4,454	49.89%	4,356	48.80%	117	1.31%	98	1.09%	8,927
Rice	11,570	54.40%	9,460	44.48%	237	1.11%	2,110	9.92%	21,267
Rock	2,435	46.69%	2,737	52.48%	43	0.82%	-302	-5.79%	5,215
Roseau	2,630	42.47%	3,500	56.52%	62	1.00%	-870	-14.05%	6,192
St. Louis	70,344	68.14%	31,799	30.80%	1,094	1.06%	38,545	37.34%	103,237
Scott	11,405	46.20%	13,050	52.87%	230	0.93%	-1,645	-6.67%	24,685
Sherburne	7,959	48.23%	8,360	50.66%	183	1.11%	-401	-2.43%	16,502
Sibley	3,154	45.45%	3,655	52.67%	130	1.87%	-501	-7.22%	6,939
Stearns	23,798	45.68%	27,529	52.85%	766	1.47%	-3,731	-7.17%	52,093
Steele	5,496	40.38%	7,981	58.64%	133	0.98%	-2,485	-18.26%	13,610
Stevens	2,721	49.85%	2,679	49.08%	58	1.06%	42	0.77%	5,458
Swift	3,579	61.73%	2,156	37.19%	63	1.09%	1,423	24.54%	5,798
Todd	5,023	46.73%	5,633	52.40%	94	0.87%	-610	-5.67%	10,750
Traverse	1,399	56.50%	1,061	42.85%	16	0.65%	338	13.65%	2,476
Wabasha	4,442	48.20%	4,681	50.80%	92	1.00%	-239	-2.60%	9,215
Wadena	2,484	39.43%	3,733	59.26%	82	1.30%	-1,249	-19.83%	6,299
Waseca	3,721	44.90%	4,471	53.95%	95	1.15%	-750	-9.05%	8,287
Washington	34,952	52.63%	30,850	46.45%	613	0.92%	4,102	6.18%	66,415
Watonwan	2,544	46.98%	2,821	52.10%	50	0.92%	-277	-5.12%	5,415
Wilkin	1,486	43.11%	1,933	56.08%	28	0.81%	-447	-12.97%	3,447
Winona	10,310	47.68%	11,012	50.92%	302	1.40%	-702	-3.24%	21,624
Wright	14,177	47.99%	14,987	50.73%	379	1.28%	-810	-2.74%	29,543
Yellow Medicine	3,282	52.28%	2,925	46.59%	71	1.13%	357	5.69%	6,278
Totals	1,109,471	52.91%	962,337	45.90%	24,982	1.19%	147,134	7.01%	2,096,790

==== Counties that flipped from Republican to Democratic ====
- Blue Earth
- Chippewa
- Clay
- Clearwater
- Cook
- Grant
- Dakota
- Isanti
- Kanabec
- Kandiyohi
- Kittson
- Lac qui Parle
- Lincoln
- Mahnomen
- Marshall
- Mille Lacs
- Murray
- Nobles
- Pennington
- Polk
- Pope
- Renville
- Stevens
- Traverse
- Washington
- Yellow Medicine

== See also ==
- United States presidential elections in Minnesota
