= 1988 Republican Party presidential primaries =

- January 14 to June 14, 1988

2,277 delegates to the Republican National Convention 1,139 (majority) votes needed to win

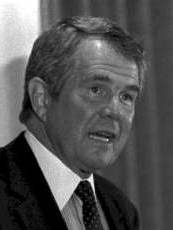
Candidate	George H. W. Bush	Bob Dole	Pat Robertson
Home state	Texas	Kansas	Virginia
Delegate count	1,840	205	115
Contests won	42	5	4
Popular vote	8,253,512	2,333,375	1,097,446
Percentage	67.9%	19.2%	9.0%

George Bush
Bob Dole
Pat Robertson
Previous Republican nominee
Ronald Reagan
Republican nominee
George H. W. Bush

From January 14 to June 14, 1988, Republican voters chose their nominee for president in the 1988 United States presidential election. Incumbent Vice President George H. W. Bush was selected as the nominee through a series of primary elections and caucuses culminating in the 1988 Republican National Convention held from August 15 to August 18, 1988, in New Orleans, Louisiana.

Bush selected Indiana Senator Dan Quayle as his running mate, and the Republican ticket went on to win the general election against the Democratic ticket of Michael Dukakis and Lloyd Bentsen by a wide margin. It was the third consecutive Republican victory in a presidential election, marking the first time since President Harry S. Truman's surprise 1948 victory that any party held the White House for more than two terms. This was the last time an incumbent Republican vice president ran for the nomination.

== Primary race ==
Vice President George H. W. Bush had the private support of President Ronald Reagan and publicly pledged to continue Reagan's policies, but also pledged a "kinder and gentler nation" in an attempt to win over some more moderate voters. Bush faced some prominent challengers for the GOP nomination, despite his front-runner status.

In 1987, Donald Trump, then known as a New York real estate executive and registered as a Republican, hinted in various television interviews that he was considering running for president. He took out a series of newspaper ads in The New York Times, The Washington Post, and The Boston Globe criticizing Reagan's foreign policy for being too expensive. He also vocally advocated reducing foreign aid to Japan, Kuwait, and Saudi Arabia; accelerating nuclear disarmament negotiations with the Soviet Union; and eliminating the federal deficit. Mike Dunbar, an important Republican operative, started a "draft Donald Trump" movement to try to convince him to run in the New Hampshire primaries. However, Trump eventually announced at a political rally arranged by Dunbar in Portsmouth, New Hampshire, that he would not seek the Republican nomination. Later, Trump approached Bush's campaign manager Lee Atwater asking to be considered as a possible choice for running mate. Bush found the request "strange and unbelievable." Apparently contradicting this report, Trump later asserted it was Atwater who approached him asking if he was interested in the position. Trump would eventually be elected president in 2016, and receive a second term in 2024.

Robertson's campaign got off to a strong second-place finish in the Iowa caucuses, ahead of Bush. Robertson did poorly in the subsequent New Hampshire primary, however, and was unable to be competitive once the multiple-state primaries like Super Tuesday began. Robertson ended his campaign before the primaries were finished. His best finish was in Washington, winning the majority of caucus delegates. However, his controversial win has been credited to procedural manipulation by Robertson supporters who delayed final voting until late into the evening when other supporters had gone home. He later spoke at the 1988 Republican National Convention in New Orleans and told his remaining supporters to cast their votes for Bush, who ended up winning the nomination and the election. He then returned to the Christian Broadcasting Network and would remain there as a religious broadcaster until his death in 2023.

Bush unexpectedly came in third in the Iowa caucus (that he had won back in 1980), behind Senator Bob Dole and Robertson. Dole was also leading in the polls of the New Hampshire primary, and the Bush camp responded by running television commercials portraying Dole as a tax raiser, while Governor John H. Sununu stumped for Bush. These efforts enabled the Vice President to defeat Dole and gain crucial momentum. Embittered by his loss in New Hampshire, Dole told Bush directly, on live television that evening, to "stop lying about my record."

Once the multiple-state primaries began, Bush's organizational strength and fundraising lead were impossible for the other candidates to match, and the nomination was his. The Republican party convention was held in New Orleans, Louisiana. Bush was nominated unanimously.

In his acceptance speech, Bush made an energetic pledge, "Read my lips: No new taxes", a comment that would come to haunt him in the 1992 election.

=== Overview ===
Active campaign	Exploratory committee	Withdrawn candidate	Republican National Convention
Midterm elections	Debates	Primaries	Republican National Convention

== Candidates ==
=== Nominee ===
Candidate	Most recent office	Home State	Campaign	Delegates won	Popular vote	Contests won	Running mate
George Bush	U.S. Vice President (1981–1989)	Texas	(Campaign); Secured nomination: April 26, 1988	1,840 (80.81%)	8,253,512 (67.90%)	42	Dan Quayle

=== Withdrew before convention ===
Candidate	Most recent office	Home State	Campaign Withdrawal date	Delegates won	Popular vote	Contests won
Pat Robertson	Chair of CBN (1960–2023)	Virginia	(Campaign); Suspended: April 6, 1988; Withdrew: May 11, 1988	115 (5.05%)	1,097,446 (9.02%)	4
Bob Dole	U.S. Senator from Kansas (1969–1996)	Kansas	(Campaign); Withdrew: March 29, 1988	205 (9.00%)	2,333,375 (19.19%)	5
Jack Kemp	U.S. Representative from New York (1971–1989)	New York	(Campaign); Withdrew: March 9, 1988	50 (2.20%)	331,333 (2.72%)	0
Pierre du Pont	Governor of Delaware (1977–1985)	Delaware	(Campaign); Withdrew: February 18, 1988	2 (0.09%)	49,783 (0.41%)	0
Alexander Haig	U.S. Secretary of State (1981–1982)	Virginia	(Campaign); Withdrew: February 12, 1988	0 (0.00%)	26,619 (0.22%)	0

=== Withdrew before primaries ===
Candidate	Most recent office	Home State	Campaign Withdrawal date
Paul Laxalt	U.S. Senator from Nevada (1974–1987)	Nevada	(Campaign); Withdrew: Aug. 26, 1987
Howard Baker	U.S. Senator from Tennessee (1967–1985)	Tennessee	(Campaign); Withdrew: Feb. 27, 1987

=== Minor candidates ===
Other notable individuals campaigning for the nomination but not featuring in major polls were:

Jack Fellure	Ben Fernandez	Harold Stassen
No Elected Office (Field Engineer at GE)	U.S. Special Envoy (Paraguay) (1973)	Governor of Minnesota (1939–1943)

=== Declined ===
Note on Declination Dates: (Note: It isn't always clear when a candidate declines to enter the race, as sometimes potential candidates will decline to run but reignite interest later in the cycle, often resulting in another declination. In light of this, the latest declination found by a prospective candidate is used.)

William Armstrong	Pat Buchanan	Jim Thompson	Thomas Kean	Jesse Helms
U.S. Senator from Colorado (1979–1991)	White House CD (1985–1987)	Governor of Illinois (1977–1991)	Governor of New Jersey (1982–1990)	U.S. Senator from North Carolina (1973–2003)
January 14, 1987	January 20, 1987	March 6, 1987	March 11, 1987	March 16, 1987
George Deukmejian	Donald Rumsfeld	William Bennett	Donald Trump	Jeane Kirkpatrick
Governor of California (1983–1991)	U.S. Secretary of Defense (1975–1977)	U.S. Secretary of Education (1985–1988)	Chairman of The Trump Org. (1971–2017)	U.S. Ambassador (United Nations) (1981–1985)
March 25, 1987	April 2, 1987	April 4, 1987	October 22, 1987	October 25, 1987

== Polling ==
=== National polling ===
Poll source	Publication date	George Bush	Bob Dole	Pete DuPont	Al Haig	Jack Kemp	Pat Robertson	Others/Undecided
Gallup	Jun. 10, 1985	39%	8%	–	–	5%	–	48%
Gallup	Jan. 13, 1986	46%	10%	–	–	5%	–	39%
Gallup	Apr. 14, 1986	40%	10%	–	2%	6%	4%	38%
Gallup	Jul. 14, 1986	41%	8%	–	3%	3%	6%	39%
Gallup	Oct. 27, 1986	42%	8%	1%	3%	5%	6%	35%
Gallup	Jan. 19, 1987	33%	14%	1%	3%	5%	5%	39%
Gallup	Apr. 13, 1987	34%	18%	2%	7%	9%	4%	26%
Gallup	June 14, 1987	39%	21%	2%	6%	8%	5%	19%
Gallup	July 13, 1987	40%	18%	3%	7%	10%	5%	17%
Gallup	Sep. 2, 1987	40%	19%	2%	4%	9%	8%	18%
Gallup	Sep. 2, 1987	47%	22%	1%	4%	4%	7%	15%
Gallup	Jan. 24, 1988	45%	30%	2%	2%	5%	8%	8%

== Results ==
Date	Pledged Delegates	Contest	Delegates Won and Popular Vote								
Date	Pledged Delegates	Contest	George Bush	Bob Dole	Pat Robertson	Jack Kemp	Pierre Du Pont	Alexander Haig	Uncommitted	Others	Total
January 14	0 (of 77)	Michigan; Caucuses	919 SDs (Note: These are delegates elected in County Conventions across the State who later attended the State Convention, where they voted on the makeup of the State Delegation to the National Convention.)	54 SDs	360 SDs	274 SDs	18 SDs	—	—	—	1,625 SDs
January 30	77 (of 77)	Michigan; State Convention	37 Del.	—	8 Del.	32 Del.	—	—	—	—	—
February 4	0 (of 20)	Hawaii; Caucuses	147 SDs	153 SDs	1,368 SDs	10 SDs	4 SDs	1 SDs	—	—	1,683 SDs
February 7	0 (of 34)	Kansas; Caucuses	—	1,233 SDs	6 SDs	—	—	10 SDs	—	—	1,683 SDs
February 8	0 (of 37)	Iowa; Caucuses	20,218 (18.59%)	40,629 (37.35%)	26,729 (24.57%)	12,078 (11.10%)	8,013 (7.37%)	364 (0.33%)	739 (0.68%)	—	108,770
February 13	4 (of 4)	Guam; Terr. Convention	4 Del.	—	—	—	—	—	—	—	—
February 16	23 (of 23)	New Hampshire; Primary	11 Del. 59,290 (37.67%)	7 Del. 44,797 (28.46%)	14,775 (9.39%)	3 Del. 20,114 (12.78%)	2 Del. 15,885 (10.09%)	481 (0.31%)	—	2,044 (1.30%)	157,386
February 18	0 (of 20)	Nevada; Caucuses	1,672 (26.48%)	1,480 (23.44%)	846 (13.40%)	875 (13.86%)	42 (0.67%)	8 (0.13%)	1,391 (22.03%)	—	6,314
February 20	20 (of 34)	Kansas; CD Conventions	—	20 Del.	—	—	—	—	—	—	—
February 20	14 (of 14)	Puerto Rico; Primary (Note: Latest found source only had about a third of precincts accounted for.)	14 Del. 1,907 (97.54%)	48 (2.46%)	—	—	—	—	—	—	1,955
February 23	18 (of 18)	South Dakota; Primary	17,404 (18.63%)	18 Del. 51,599 (55.24%)	18,310 (19.60%)	4,290 (4.59%)	576 (0.62%)	—	1,226 (1.31%)	—	93,405
February 23	0 (of 31)	Minnesota; Caucuses (Note: Latest found source only had 3,274 of 4,076 precincts accounted for.)	5,979 (10.64%)	23,923 (42.56%)	15,969 (28.41%)	8,535 (15.18%)	—	—	1,613 (2.87%)	192 (0.34%)	56,211
February 28	0 (of 22)	Maine; Caucuses (Note: Latest found source only had 1,088 of 1,506 state delegates accounted for.)	713 SDs	88 SDs	150 SDs	14 SDs	—	—	123 SDs	—	1,506 SDs
March 1	0 (of 19)	Alaska; Caucuses	487 SDs	395 SDs	941 SDs	139 SDs	—	—	58 SDs	—	2,020 SDs
March 1	0 (of 17)	Vermont; Primary	23,565 (49.27%)	18,655 (39.00%)	2,452 (5.13%)	1,877 (3.92%)	808 (1.69%)	324 (0.68%)	—	151 (0.32%)	47,832
March 5	14 (of 34)	Kansas; State Convention	—	14 Del.	—	—	—	—	—	—	—
March 5	37 (of 37)	South Carolina; Primary	37 Del. 94,738 (48.51%)	40,265 (20.62%)	37,261 (19.08%)	22,431 (11.49%)	316 (0.16%)	177 (0.09%)	—	104 (Note: South Carolina "Other" Vote) (0.05%)	213,565
March 5	12 (of 18)	Wyoming; County Conventions	5 Del.	5 Del.	—	—	—	—	2 Del.	—	—
March 8	38 (of 38)	Alabama; Primary	35 Del. 137,807 (64.53%)	3 Del. 34,733 (16.26%)	29,776 (13.94%)	10,557 (4.94%)	392 (0.18%)	300 (0.14%)	—	—	213,565
March 8	27 (of 27)	Arkansas; Primary	13 Del. 32,114 (47.02%)	7 Del. 17,667 (25.87%)	5 Del. 12,918 (18.91%)	2 Del. 3,449 (5.12%)	359 (0.53%)	346 (0.51%)	1,402 (2.05%)	—	68,305
March 8	82 (of 82)	Florida; Primary	82 Del. 559,397 (62.14%)	191,494 (21.27%)	95,037 (10.56%)	41,762 (4.64%)	6,718 (0.75%)	5,849 (0.65%)	—	—	900,257
March 8	48 (of 48)	Georgia; Primary	48 Del. 215,516 (53.75%)	94,749 (23.63%)	65,163 (16.25%)	23,409 (5.84%)	1,309 (0.33%)	782 (0.20%)	—	—	400,928
March 8	38 (of 38)	Kentucky; Primary	27 Del. 72,020 (59.32%)	11 Del. 27,868 (22.96%)	13,526 (11.14%)	4,020 (3.31%)	457 (0.38%)	422 (0.35%)	2,245 (1.85%)	844 (Note: Kentucky "Other" Vote) (0.70%)	121,402
March 8	34 (of 41)	Louisiana; Primary	34 Del. 83,684 (57.80%)	25,624 (17.70%)	26,294 (18.16%)	7,722 (5.33%)	851 (0.59%)	598 (0.41%)	—	—	144,773
March 8	41 (of 41)	Maryland; Primary	41 Del. 107,026 (53.31%)	64,987 (32.37%)	12,860 (6.41%)	11,909 (5.93%)	2,551 (1.27%)	1,421 (0.71%)	—	—	200,754
March 8	52 (of 52)	Massachusetts; Primary	30 Del. 141,113 (53.31%)	13 Del. 63,392 (26.28%)	2 Del. 10,891 (4.52%)	3 Del. 16,791 (6.96%)	3,522 (1.46%)	1,705 (0.71%)	4 Del. 3,416 (1.42%)	351 (0.15%)	241,181
March 8	31 (of 31)	Mississippi; Primary	27 Del. 104,814 (66.06%)	2 Del. 27,004 (17.02%)	2 Del. 21,378 (13.47%)	5,479 (3.45%)	—	—	—	—	158,675
March 8	47 (of 47)	Missouri; Primary	19 Del. 168,812 (42.17%)	19 Del. 164,394 (41.07%)	44,705 (11.17%)	14,180 (3.54%)	1,788 (0.45%)	858 (0.21%)	9 Del. 5,563 (1.39%)	—	400,300
March 8	54 (of 54)	North Carolina; Primary	29 Del. 124,260 (45.38%)	25 Del. 107,032 (39.09%)	26,861 (9.81%)	11,361 (4.15%)	944 (0.35%)	546 (0.20%)	2,797 (1.02%)	—	273,801
March 8	36 (of 36)	Oklahoma; Primary	33 Del. 78,224 (37.44%)	3 Del. 73,016 (34.95%)	44,067 (21.09%)	11,439 (5.48%)	938 (0.45%)	715 (0.34%)	—	539 (Note: Oklahoma "Other" Vote) (0.26%)	208,938
March 8	21 (of 21)	Rhode Island; Primary	15 Del. 10,401 (64.86%)	6 Del. 3,628 (22.63%)	911 (5.68%)	792 (4.94%)	80 (0.50%)	49 (0.31%)	174 (1.09%)	—	16,035
March 8	45 (of 45)	Tennessee; Primary	28 Del. 152,515 (59.99%)	13 Del. 55,027 (21.64%)	1 Del. 32,015 (12.59%)	10,911 (4.29%)	646 (0.25%)	777 (0.31%)	3 Del. 2,340 (0.92%)	—	254,252
March 8	111 (of 111)	Texas; Primary	111 Del. 648,178 (63.86%)	140,795 (13.87%)	155,449 (15.32%)	50,586 (4.98%)	4,245 (0.42%)	3,140 (0.31%)	12,563 (1.24%)	—	1,014,956
March 8	0 (of 50)	Virginia; Primary	124,738 (53.28%)	60,921 (26.02%)	32,173 (13.74%)	10,809 (4.62%)	1,229 (0.53%)	597 (0.26%)	3,675 (1.57%)	—	234,142
March 8	0 (of 41)	Washington; Caucuses	3,694 (24.29%)	3,955 (26.00%)	5,934 (39.01%)	1,144 (7.52%)	33 (0.22%)	6 (0.04%)	444 (2.92%)	—	15,210
March 15	0 (of 82)	Illinois; Preference Primary	469,151 (54.64%)	309,253 (36.02%)	59,087 (6.88%)	12,687 (1.48%)	4,653 (0.54%)	3,806 (0.44%)	—	—	858,637
March 15	82 (of 82)	Illinois; Delegate Primary	74 Del.	8 Del.	—	—	—	—	—	—	—
March 19	7 (of 41)	Louisiana; State Committee	—	—	—	—	—	—	7 Del.	—	—
March 29	35 (of 35)	Connecticut; Primary	25 Del. 73,501 (70.56%)	10 Del. 21,005 (20.16%)	3,191 (3.06%)	3,281 (3.15%)	—	—	3,193 (3.07%)	—	104,171
April 4	0 (of 36)	Colorado; Caucuses (Note: The actual vote of the straw poll was not provided beyond general percentages.)	(~76.4%)	—	(~9.4%)	—	—	—	(~14.2%) (Note: Represents both votes for candidates other than Bush and Robertson, in addition to those uncommitted; the source did not differentiate between them.)	—	?
April 5	47 (of 47)	Wisconsin; Primary	47 Del. 295,295 (82.19%)	28,460 (7.92%)	24,798 (6.90%)	4,915 (1.37%)	1,504 (0.42%)	1,554 (0.46%)	2,372 (0.66%)	396 (0.11%)	359,294
April 16	22 (of 22)	Maine; State Convention	22 Del.	—	—	—	—	—	—	—	—
April 16	9 (of 31)	Minnesota; CD Conventions (Note: Not all District Conventions in Minnesota were held on the same day; on this date, the only Districts that held Conventions were the 1st, 2nd, and 6th. The delegate breakdown was as follows: 1st (Bush 3), 2nd (2 Uncommitted, 1 Bush), 6th (2 Uncommitted, 1 Kemp). However, as delegates were not formally pledged to their positions, the breakdown by May 7th had changed as follows: 1st (3 Bush), 2nd (3 Bush), 6th (2 Robertson, 1 Bush).)	4 Del.	—	—	1 Del.	—	—	4 Del.	—	—
April 19	102 (of 136)	New York; Delegate Primary	97 Del.	—	—	4 Del.	—	—	1 Del.	—	—
April 19	0 (of 17)	Vermont; Caucuses (Note: Of the 1,000 delegates allotted to go to the State Convention, only 33% of those selected were accounted for by the source.)	291 SDs	—	—	—	—	—	34 SDs	—	1,000 SDs
April 23	0 (of 33)	Arizona; Caucuses	507 SDs	—	—	—	—	—	210 SDs	—	717 SDs
April 23	20 (of 20)	Nevada; State Convention	4 Del.	—	14 Del.	—	—	—	2 Del.	—	—
April 25	0 (of 17)	Delaware; State Caucuses (Note: The caucuses were held at seven locations, their dates ranging from April 11th to April 25th. However, straw-polls of the delegates were only done in four of the locations (Wilmington, Brandywine Hundred, Christiana-Millcreek, Newark), with three not reporting (Colonial, Kent County, Sussex County).)	113 SDs	—	3 SDs	—	31 SDs	—	—	4 SDs	283 SDs
April 25	0 (of 26)	Utah; Caucuses	N/A (Note: No preference poll was held, with George Bush being the only remaining active candidate for the Republican nomination.)	—	—	—	—	—	—	—	—
April 26	0 (of 96)	Pennsylvania; Pref. Primary	687,323 (78.95%)	103,763 (11.92%)	79,463 (9.13%)	—	—	—	—	—	870,549
April 26	96 (of 96)	Pennsylvania; Delegate Primary (Note: A quirk with the Republican Delegate Primary is that candidates could not enter a delegate slate under their name; no delegate was allowed to state their candidate preference on the ballot. As a result, the allegiances of prospective delegates was extremely fluid, especially once other major candidates withdrew or suspended their campaigns.)	90 Del.	—	3 Del.	—	—	—	3 Del.	—	—
April 30	19 (of 19)	Alaska; State Convention	8 Del.	—	11 Del.	—	—	—	—	—	—
April 30	3 (of 31)	Minnesota; CD Conventions (Note: Not all District Conventions in Minnesota were held on the same day; on this date, the only District that held a Convention was the 8th.)	1 Del.	—	2 Del.	—	—	—	—	—	—
May 3	51 (of 51)	Indiana; Primary	51 Del. 351,829 (80.39%)	42,878 (9.80%)	28,712 (6.56%)	14,236 (3.25%)	—	—	—	—	437,655
May 3	88 (of 88)	Ohio; Primary	88 Del. 643,907 (81.00%)	94,650 (11.91%)	56,347 (7.09%)	—	—	—	—	—	794,904
May 3	14 (of 14)	Washington, D.C. Primary	14 Del. 5,890 (87.65%)	469 (6.98%)	268 (3.99%)	—	—	—	—	93 (1.38%)	6,720
May 7	12 (of 31)	Minnesota; CD Conventions (Note: Not all District Conventions in Minnesota were held on the same day; on this date, the only Districts that held Conventions were the 3rd, 4th, 5th, and 7th. The only Non-Bush delegates were in the 5th (2 Uncommitted, 1 Bush))	10 Del.	—	—	—	—	—	2 Del.	—	—
May 7	6 (of 18)	Wyoming; State Convention	5 Del.	—	—	—	—	—	1 Del.	—	—
May 9	34 (of 136)	New York; State Committee	34 Del. (Note: NewYorkAtLargeDelegates)	—	—	—	—	—	—	—	—
May 10	0 (of 25)	Nebraska; Preference Primary	138,784 (68.02%)	45,572 (22.33%)	10,334 (5.06%)	8,423 (4.13%)	—	—	—	936 (0.46%)	204,049
May 10	9 (of 25)	Nebraska; Delegate Primary	6 Del.	1 Del.	—	—	—	—	—	2 Del.	—
May 10	28 (of 28)	West Virginia; Primary	24 Del. 110,705 (77.34%)	2 Del. 15,600 (10.90%)	10,417 (7.28%)	3,820 (2.68%)	—	—	2 Del.	2,598 (Note: West Virginia "Other" Vote) (1.82%)	143,140
May 14	33 (of 33)	Arizona; State Convention	30 Del.	—	3 Del. (Note: Robertson technically won 3 delegates from the 3rd Congressional District; some sources tally them as Bush delegates as they specified they'd support him at the National Convention.)	—	—	—	—	—	—
May 14	17 (of 17)	Delaware; State Convention	17 Del.	—	—	—	—	—	—	—	—
May 17	32 (of 32)	Oregon; Primary	32 Del. 199,938 (72.84%)	49,128 (17.90%)	21,212 (7.73%)	—	—	—	—	4,208 (1.53%)	274,486
May 21	17 (of 17)	Vermont; State Convention	17 Del.	—	—	—	—	—	—	—	—
May 21	4 (of 4)	Virgin Islands; Terr. Convention	4 Del. (Note: VirginIslandsDelegates)	—	—	—	—	—	—	—	
May 24	18 (of 22)	Idaho; Primary	15 Del. 55,464 (81.24%)	—	1 Del. 5,876 (8.61%)	—	—	—	2 Del. 6,935 (10.16%)	—	68,275
June 4	36 (of 36)	Colorado; State Convention	36 Del.	—	—	—	—	—	—	—	—
June 7	175 (of 175)	California; Primary	175 Del. 1,856,273 (82.86%)	289,220 (12.91%)	94,779 (4.23%)	—	—	—	—	115 (Note: California "Other" Vote) (0.01%)	2,240,387
June 7	0 (of 20)	Montana; Primary	63,098 (73.05%)	16,762 (19.41%)	—	—	—	—	6,520 (7.55%)	—	86,380
June 7	64 (of 64)	New Jersey; Primary	64 Del. 241,033 (100.00%)	—	—	—	—	—	—	—	241,033
June 7	26 (of 26)	New Mexico; Primary	26 Del. 69,359 (78.16%)	9,305 (10.35%)	5,350 (6.03%)	—	—	2,161 (2.44%)	2,569 (2.90%)	—	88,744
June 11	26 (of 26)	Utah; State Convention	26 Del. (Note: This is assumed; while a bevy of major figures were present at the State Convention arguing in favor of Bush's nomination, no source specified which delegates, if any, were actually pledged to Bush.)	—	—	—	—	—	—	—	
June 11	50 (of 50)	Virginia; CD Conventions (Note: The delegate selection process for Virginia was much the same as that in Minnesota, in that earlier Congressional District Conventions would elect a majority of the delegation, with the State Convention deciding on the remainder. In practice, 30 of Virginia's delegates were chosen at the District Conventions throughout May, with a further 20 chosen at the State Convention on June 11th. However, information on the District Conventions was sparse in regards to the delegate contests; for this reason, the lot is combined in the table as a single entry.); State Convention	47 Del.	—	3 Del.	—	—	—	—	—	—
June 14	16 (of 16)	North Dakota; Primary	16 Del. 37,062 (93.99%)	—	—	—	—	—	—	2,372 (Note: North Dakota "Other" Vote) (6.02%)	39,434
June 18	20 (of 20)	Hawaii; State Convention	2 Del.	—	18 Del.	—	—	—	—	—	—
June 18	4 (of 22)	Idaho; State Convention	—	—	—	—	—	—	4 Del. (Note: IdahoConventionDelegates)	—	—
June 18	7 (of 31)	Minnesota; State Convention	1 Del.	2 Del.	1 Del.	3 Del.	—	—	—	—	—
June 24	30 (of 37)	Iowa; CD Conventions	10 Del.	14 Del.	2 Del.	2 Del.	—	—	2 Del.	—	—
June 25	7 (of 37)	Iowa; State Convention	2 Del.	2 Del.	—	—	—	—	3 Del.	—	—
July 1	24 (of 41)	Washington; CD Conventions	—	—	24 Del.	—	—	—	—	—	—
July 2	17 (of 41)	Washington; State Convention	2 Del.	—	15 Del.	—	—	—	—	—	—
July 9	20 (of 20)	Montana; State Convention	20 Del. (Note: This is assumed; sources identified the delegates elected, but no preferences were stated.)	—	—	—	—	—	—	—	—
July 9	16 (of 25)	Nebraska; State Convention	14 Del.	—	—	—	—	—	2 Del.	—	—
Totals			1,840 Del. 8,253,512 (67.90%)	205 Del. 2,333,375 (19.19%)	115 Del. 1,097,446 (9.02%)	50 Del. 331,333 (2.72%)	2 Del. 49,783 (0.41%)	26,619 (0.22%)	53 Del. 61,177 (0.49%)	14,943 (0.12%)	2,277 Del. 12,371,163

== Running mate ==
After Bush locked up the nomination in March, conventional wisdom leaned toward the notion of a Southern running mate to balance the ticket. The former Governor of Tennessee, Lamar Alexander, was seen by many as the most logical choice, and some early reports described him as Bush's personal preference. Another high-profile possibility, also from Tennessee, was the former Senate Majority Leader and White House Chief of Staff Howard Baker. Despite the early attention – which included a supportive editorial written by former President Richard Nixon – Baker told the press that he would prefer to be left out of consideration.

Bush's running mate, however, would not be revealed until August 16, allowing speculation to intensify all the way to the national convention. Bob Dole, who was considered a leading contender based on his second-place finish in the primaries, expressed impatience with the wait but nonetheless made plain his keen desire for the job. So too did Jack Kemp, who confidently told reporters that he would make "a terrific campaigner and a terrific candidate and a terrific vice president". Both men were thought to rank high on Bush's list of potential picks.

Other highly rated prospects included two people quite close to Dole. His wife, Elizabeth Dole, had served as Transportation Secretary under President Reagan and was a popular figure among conservatives and women – two key demographics that Bush was struggling to galvanize. A second option was Dole's fellow U.S. Senator from Kansas, Nancy Kassebaum. Other figures who were believed to be under Bush's close consideration included the Governor of Nebraska Kay Orr, the former Governor of Pennsylvania Dick Thornburgh, the Governor of New Jersey Tom Kean, and the sitting U.S. Senators Bill Armstrong of Colorado, Pete Domenici of New Mexico, and Richard Lugar and Dan Quayle, both of Indiana.

U.S. Senator Alan Simpson of Wyoming was also widely believed to be a possible selection, but he publicly stated that he wasn't interested in the position. This placed him in the company of Baker and others who had declared that they did not want to be considered, such as the Governor of California George Deukmejian and the Governor of Illinois Jim Thompson. Shortly ahead of the convention, however, Bush reopened speculation about all of them when he implied that he would not necessarily give up on any demurring prospects.

Long-shot possibilities included several Republicans who were popular in their home states but held limited name recognition nationally, such as U.S. Representative Lynn Martin of Illinois, the Governor of South Carolina Carroll Campbell, and the two U.S. Senators of Missouri, John Danforth and Christopher Bond. Nontraditional selections who were seen as credible alternatives included the National Security Advisor Colin Powell, the former UN Ambassador Jeane Kirkpatrick, Education Secretary William Bennett, former EPA Administrator William Ruckelshaus, and even Supreme Court Justice Sandra Day O'Connor.

Bush announced his selection of 41-year-old Dan Quayle on the second day of the convention.

== See also ==
- 1988 Democratic Party presidential primaries
