= 1988 United States presidential election in Hawaii =

- November 8, 1988

Nominee	Michael Dukakis	George H. W. Bush
Party	Democratic	Republican
Home state	Massachusetts	Texas
Running mate	Lloyd Bentsen	Dan Quayle
Electoral vote	4	0
Popular vote	192,364	158,625
Percentage	54.27%	44.75%
County results
Dukakis
50–60%
President before election
Ronald Reagan
Republican
Elected President
George H. W. Bush
Republican

The 1988 United States presidential election in Hawaii took place on November 8, 1988. All 50 states and the District of Columbia, were part of the 1988 United States presidential election. Hawaii voters chose 4 electors to the Electoral College, which selected the president and vice president.

Hawaii was won by Massachusetts Governor Michael Dukakis who was running against incumbent United States Vice President George H. W. Bush of Texas. Dukakis ran with Texas Senator Lloyd Bentsen as vice president, and Bush ran with Indiana Senator Dan Quayle. The election was very partisan for Hawaii, with 99% of the electorate voting for either the Democratic or Republican parties. All four of the Hawaiian island counties voted in majority for Dukakis. Hawaii weighed in for this election as 17% more Democratic than the national average. Dukakis won the election in Hawaii with a solid 10-point win. This is the last time any candidate flipped every county in any state from the previous election, as Dukakis won every county in the state after Ronald Reagan did so in 1984. This is the only election since its statehood in which Hawaii voted for a different candidate than Maryland.

== Results ==
1988 United States presidential election in Hawaii
Party	Candidate	Votes	Percentage	Electoral votes
Democratic	Michael Dukakis	192,364	54.27%	4
Republican	George H. W. Bush	158,625	44.75%	0
Libertarian	Ron Paul	1,999	0.56%	0
New Alliance	Lenora Fulani	1,003	0.28%	0
Democrats for Economic Recovery	Lyndon LaRouche	470	0.13%	0
Totals		354,461	100.0%	4

=== Results by county ===
County	Michael Dukakis Democratic		George H. W. Bush Republican		Various candidates Other parties		Margin		Total votes cast
County	#	%	#	%	#	%	#	%	Total votes cast
Hawaii	24,091	57.68%	17,125	41.00%	552	1.32%	6,966	16.68%	41,768
Honolulu	138,971	53.13%	120,258	45.97%	2,348	0.90%	18,713	7.16%	261,577
Kauaʻi	11,770	58.08%	8,298	40.95%	198	0.98%	3,472	17.13%	20,266
Maui	17,532	56.83%	12,944	41.96%	374	1.21%	4,588	14.87%	30,850
Totals	192,364	54.27%	158,625	44.75%	3,472	0.97%	33,739	9.52%	354,461

==== Counties that flipped from Republican to Democratic ====
- Hawaii
- Honolulu
- Kauaʻi
- Maui

== See also ==
- Presidency of George H. W. Bush
