= 1988 United States presidential election in Florida =

- November 8, 1988
- Turnout: 71% ▼

Nominee	George H. W. Bush	Michael Dukakis
Party	Republican	Democratic
Home state	Texas	Massachusetts
Running mate	Dan Quayle	Lloyd Bentsen
Electoral vote	21	0
Popular vote	2,618,885	1,656,701
Percentage	60.87%	38.51%
County results
Bush
50–60%
60–70%
70–80%
80–90%
Dukakis
50–60%
President before election
Ronald Reagan
Republican
Elected President
George H. W. Bush
Republican

The 1988 United States presidential election in Florida took place on November 8, 1988. All fifty states and the District of Columbia, were part of the 1988 United States presidential election. Florida voters chose twenty-one electors to the Electoral College, which selected the president and vice president.

Florida was won by incumbent Vice President George H. W. Bush, running with U.S Senator Dan Quayle, against Governor Michael Dukakis, running with U.S. Senator Lloyd Bentsen. This was Bush's fifth strongest state in the 1988 election after Utah, New Hampshire, Idaho and South Carolina.

Bush won every county in the state, with the exception of North Florida's majority-black Gadsden County, which voted for Dukakis. This was the last time until 2008 that Orange County voted for the national winner.

Until 2024, this was the last time Miami-Dade County (then known simply as Dade County) voted for a Republican candidate or any candidate won the state by double digits. As of 2024, this is also the last election in which Broward County, Palm Beach County, Alachua County, or Leon County voted for a Republican presidential candidate.

== Background ==
The Republican presidential nominee had won Florida in seven of the nine presidential elections since 1952. By the 1980s the Republicans had also won the governorship and enough seats in the state legislature to maintain a veto. From 1979 to 1986, the percentage of voters affiliated with the Democratic Party fell from 45% to 32% while the Republicans rose from 26% to 38%. Florida was one of the states that designated the second Tuesday of March as the date for their presidential primary as a part of Super Tuesday.

== Primaries ==
Five of the seven Republican members of the U.S. House of Representatives from Florida endorsed George H. W. Bush in 1987, and Governor Bob Martinez served as his national co-chair. Bush won all but three counties in the primary, with the remainder being won by Pat Robertson; 45% of white voters participated in the Republican primary.

Florida was one of the southern Super Tuesday states that Michael Dukakis focused on as he could receive the support of Hispanics and northerners. His campaign had twenty paid staffers in the state during the primary, but later reduced the number to ten during the general campaign and were transferred to Illinois. Dukakis won 53% of the white vote. The racial composition of the primary was 82% white, 18% black, and 1% Hispanic. White people raised outside the state made up 56% of the electorate, the highest in any southern state.

=== Primary results ===
==== Republican ====
1988 Florida Republican presidential primary results
Candidate	Vote received	
Candidate	#	%
George H.W. Bush	559,397	62.1%
Bob Dole	191,494	21.3%
Pat Robertson	95,037	10.6%
Jack Kemp	41,762	4.6%
Pete Du Pont	6,718	0.7%
Alexander M. Haig, Jr.	5,849	0.6%
Total	900,257	100%

==== Democratic ====
1988 Florida Democratic presidential primary results
Candidate	Vote received	
Candidate	#	%
Michael Dukakis	520,948	40.9%
Jesse Jackson	254,825	20.0%
Dick Gephardt	182,809	14.4%
Al Gore	161,116	12.7%
Undecided	79,407	6.2%
Gary Hart	36,291	2.9%
Paul Simon	27,592	2.2%
Bruce Babbitt	10,277	0.8%
Total	1,273,265	100%

== Campaign ==
Florida gave Bush his second highest-percentage amount of support in the south, only behind South Carolina, and the fifth-highest nationally. Exit polls conducted by NBC showed that Bush received 64% of the vote from Hispanics aged 18 to 34 and 55% from Hispanics over 65. Among white voters, 67% supported Bush while 33% supported Dukakis.

The Republicans won the concurrent U.S. Senate election and increased their share of the U.S. House delegate to nine Republicans against ten Democrats. Representative Bill Grant joined the Republicans in 1989, giving them a majority of the U.S. House delegation.

== Results ==
United States presidential election in Florida, 1988
Party	Candidate	Votes	Percentage	Electoral votes
Republican	George H. W. Bush	2,618,885	60.87%	21
Democratic	Michael Dukakis	1,656,701	38.51%	0
Libertarian	Ron Paul	19,796	0.46%	0
New Alliance Party	Lenora Fulani	6,655	0.15%	0
Write-Ins		276	0.01%	0
Totals		4,302,313	100.0%	21

=== Results by county ===
County	George H.W. Bush Republican		Michael Dukakis Democratic		Various candidates Other parties		Margin		Total
County	#	%	#	%	#	%	#	%	Total
Alachua	30,153	50.08%	29,396	48.82%	664	1.10%	757	1.26%	60,213
Baker	3,418	71.49%	1,355	28.34%	8	0.17%	2,063	43.15%	4,781
Bay	31,796	72.51%	11,603	26.46%	452	1.03%	20,193	46.05%	43,851
Bradford	4,221	63.61%	2,386	35.96%	29	0.44%	1,835	27.65%	6,636
Brevard	104,854	70.30%	43,004	28.83%	1,301	0.87%	61,850	41.47%	149,159
Broward	220,316	50.00%	218,274	49.54%	2,015	0.46%	2,042	0.46%	440,605
Calhoun	2,422	64.01%	1,329	35.12%	33	0.87%	1,093	28.89%	3,784
Charlotte	28,893	63.98%	15,974	35.37%	292	0.65%	12,919	28.61%	45,159
Citrus	21,072	62.95%	12,184	36.40%	218	0.65%	8,888	26.55%	33,474
Clay	25,942	76.67%	7,773	22.97%	122	0.36%	18,169	53.70%	33,837
Collier	38,920	74.87%	12,769	24.57%	291	0.56%	26,151	50.30%	51,980
Columbia	7,761	65.13%	4,073	34.18%	82	0.69%	3,688	30.95%	11,916
Dade	270,937	55.26%	216,970	44.26%	2,358	0.48%	53,967	11.00%	490,265
DeSoto	4,243	65.64%	2,181	33.74%	40	0.62%	2,062	31.90%	6,464
Dixie	2,031	59.79%	1,366	40.21%	0	0.00%	665	19.58%	3,397
Duval	128,081	62.79%	74,894	36.72%	1,004	0.49%	53,187	26.07%	203,979
Escambia	64,959	68.05%	29,977	31.40%	524	0.55%	34,982	36.65%	95,460
Flagler	6,504	60.32%	4,244	39.36%	34	0.32%	2,260	20.96%	10,782
Franklin	1,913	58.52%	1,283	39.25%	73	2.23%	630	19.27%	3,269
Gadsden	5,992	47.64%	6,372	50.66%	213	1.69%	-380	-3.02%	12,577
Gilchrist	1,855	61.59%	1,137	37.75%	20	0.66%	718	23.84%	3,012
Glades	1,547	59.66%	1,034	39.88%	12	0.46%	513	19.78%	2,593
Gulf	3,042	62.44%	1,688	34.65%	142	2.91%	1,354	27.79%	4,872
Hamilton	2,062	60.72%	1,318	38.81%	16	0.47%	744	21.91%	3,396
Hardee	3,640	66.96%	1,688	31.05%	108	1.99%	1,952	35.91%	5,436
Hendry	3,965	65.70%	2,036	33.74%	34	0.56%	1,929	31.96%	6,035
Hernando	21,195	57.50%	15,437	41.88%	231	0.63%	5,758	15.62%	36,863
Highlands	16,723	67.05%	8,091	32.44%	127	0.51%	8,632	34.61%	24,941
Hillsborough	150,151	59.89%	99,014	39.49%	1,551	0.62%	51,137	20.40%	250,716
Holmes	4,225	71.61%	1,639	27.78%	36	0.61%	2,586	43.83%	5,900
Indian River	24,630	69.71%	10,451	29.58%	252	0.71%	14,179	40.13%	35,333
Jackson	8,405	62.20%	5,008	37.06%	100	0.74%	3,397	25.14%	13,513
Jefferson	2,326	52.89%	2,055	46.73%	17	0.39%	271	6.16%	4,398
Lafayette	1,451	66.41%	722	33.04%	12	0.55%	729	33.37%	2,185
Lake	37,327	68.40%	16,766	30.72%	479	0.88%	20,561	37.68%	54,572
Lee	87,303	67.71%	40,725	31.59%	908	0.70%	46,578	36.12%	128,936
Leon	36,055	51.39%	33,472	47.71%	631	0.90%	2,583	3.68%	70,158
Levy	5,253	59.75%	3,434	39.06%	104	1.18%	1,819	20.69%	8,791
Liberty	1,421	65.27%	709	32.57%	47	2.16%	712	32.70%	2,177
Madison	2,563	56.59%	1,951	43.08%	15	0.33%	612	13.51%	4,529
Manatee	51,187	65.53%	26,624	34.08%	302	0.39%	24,563	31.45%	78,113
Marion	41,501	66.38%	20,685	33.09%	334	0.53%	20,816	33.29%	62,520
Martin	31,279	72.60%	11,488	26.66%	316	0.73%	19,791	45.94%	43,083
Monroe	15,928	60.32%	10,157	38.47%	320	1.21%	5,771	21.85%	26,405
Nassau	8,374	66.59%	4,143	32.95%	58	0.46%	4,231	33.64%	12,575
Okaloosa	40,389	80.04%	9,753	19.33%	320	0.63%	30,636	60.71%	50,462
Okeechobee	4,736	60.79%	3,007	38.60%	48	0.62%	1,729	22.19%	7,791
Orange	117,237	67.86%	54,023	31.27%	1,510	0.87%	63,214	36.59%	172,770
Osceola	21,355	68.05%	9,812	31.27%	214	0.68%	11,543	36.78%	31,381
Palm Beach	181,495	55.47%	144,199	44.07%	1,523	0.47%	37,296	11.40%	327,217
Pasco	63,820	55.59%	50,385	43.89%	598	0.52%	13,435	11.70%	114,803
Pinellas	211,049	57.76%	152,420	41.72%	1,901	0.52%	58,629	16.04%	365,370
Polk	77,104	66.45%	38,249	32.96%	687	0.59%	38,855	33.49%	116,040
Putnam	11,624	57.24%	8,575	42.23%	108	0.53%	3,049	15.01%	20,307
St. Johns	19,228	70.14%	8,029	29.29%	158	0.58%	11,199	40.85%	27,415
St. Lucie	32,319	64.54%	17,446	34.84%	314	0.63%	14,873	29.70%	50,079
Santa Rosa	18,973	77.85%	5,254	21.56%	143	0.59%	13,719	56.29%	24,370
Sarasota	84,602	66.40%	42,099	33.04%	708	0.56%	42,503	33.36%	127,409
Seminole	60,401	72.20%	22,635	27.06%	622	0.74%	37,766	45.14%	83,658
Sumter	5,936	59.98%	3,900	39.41%	60	0.61%	2,036	20.57%	9,896
Suwannee	5,863	64.27%	3,129	34.30%	130	1.43%	2,734	29.97%	9,122
Taylor	4,057	69.06%	1,763	30.01%	55	0.94%	2,294	39.05%	5,875
Union	1,644	69.99%	691	29.42%	14	0.60%	953	40.57%	2,349
Volusia	74,195	56.56%	55,469	42.28%	1,518	1.16%	18,726	14.28%	131,182
Wakulla	3,158	65.72%	1,605	33.40%	42	0.87%	1,553	32.32%	4,805
Walton	7,490	69.30%	3,235	29.93%	83	0.77%	4,255	39.37%	10,808
Washington	4,374	66.64%	2,144	32.66%	46	0.70%	2,230	33.98%	6,564
Totals	2,618,885	60.87%	1,656,701	38.51%	26,727	0.62%	962,184	22.36%	4,302,313

=== Results by congressional district ===
Bush carried 18 of the 19 congressional districts.

District	Bush	Dukakis
1st	73.2%	26.8%
2nd	59.7%	40.3%
3rd	60%	40%
4th	64.1%	35.9%
5th	69%	31%
6th	61.1%	38.9%
7th	58.3%	41.7%
8th	56%	44%
9th	60.5%	39.5%
10th	66.4%	33.6%
11th	71%	29%
12th	64.6%	35.4%
13th	68%	32%
14th	53.1%	46.9%
15th	53.3%	46.7%
16th	55.6%	44.4%
17th	40.9%	59.1%
18th	58%	42%
19th	58.9%	41.1%

== See also ==
- Presidency of George H. W. Bush

== Works cited ==
- Black, Earl; Black, Merle (1992). The Vital South: How Presidents Are Elected. Harvard University Press. ISBN 0674941306.
- Moreland, Laurence; Steed, Robert; Baker, Tod, eds. (1991). The 1988 Presidential Election in the South: Continuity Amidst Change in Southern Party Politics. Praeger Publishers. ISBN 0275931455.
