= Nancy Ross (politician) =

American political activist (born 1943)

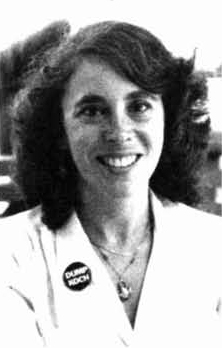
- Nancy Ross pictured in about 1984
- Born: 1943 (age 82–83)
- Occupation: Political activist
- Years active: 1977–present
- Political party: New Alliance Party

Nancy Ross (born 1943) is an American political activist associated with the New Alliance Party. She stood as the party's candidate for Vice President of the United States in the 1984 United States presidential election and later led the New Alliance–affiliated Rainbow Lobby. As of 2024, she is a board member of Independent Voting.

== Early life and electoral politics ==
Nancy Ross, a teacher by profession, was a social therapy client and later practitioner. She was elected to New York City's Community School Board No. 3 in 1977. (Note: From the 1970s until the early 2000s, all of New York City's public schools were partially decentralized under the control of dozens of community school boards.) The success of Ross in the school board election jumpstarted the Newmanite movement's interest in electoral politics and, in 1979, Ross helped found the New Alliance Party.

In 1981 Ross was an unsuccessful candidate for New York City Council and later stood as the New Alliance Party's candidate in the 1982 New York gubernatorial election.

In 1984, seven years after her electoral victory in the school board election, she was selected as the New Alliance candidate for Vice President of the United States, running with the party's presidential nominee Dennis L. Serrette. Though Ross only held the second spot on the New Alliance ticket, Serrette would later describe that campaign staff actually reported to Ross who, in turn, reported to Fred Newman. (Note: According to Serrette: "it was clear they weren't taking orders from me on this campaign, but they were taking directions from Nancy Ross, who was taking orders from Fred Newman, and that I was a spectator".)

== Later life and post-electoral activism ==
Ross later served as executive director of the New Alliance–associated Rainbow Lobby, described in one 1988 newspaper report as "the fastest growing, independent citizens lobby in America". (Note: According to Mervyn Dymally, critics denounced the organization as politically opportunistic and charged that it had selected its name to imply a connection with Jesse Jackson's Rainbow/PUSH coalition, a criticism to which Ross responded "the point is not whether Jesse Jackson supports me, but whether I support Jesse Jackson", while going on to note that she disagreed with Jesse Jackson on a number of issues.)

In 1992, following the closure of the Rainbow Lobby, Ross co-founded the lobbying firm of Ross and Green with Ann Green. As of 2024, she is a board member of Independent Voting, an umbrella organization of the New Alliance–inspired independent voting movement.

== See also ==
- Lenora Fulani
