= 1994 New York gubernatorial election =

Gubernatorial elections in New York

- November 8, 1994
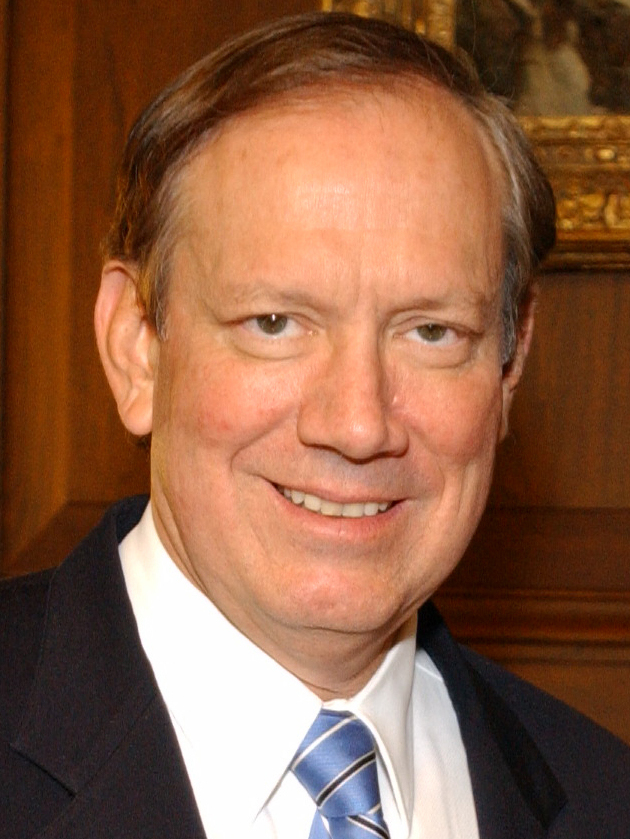

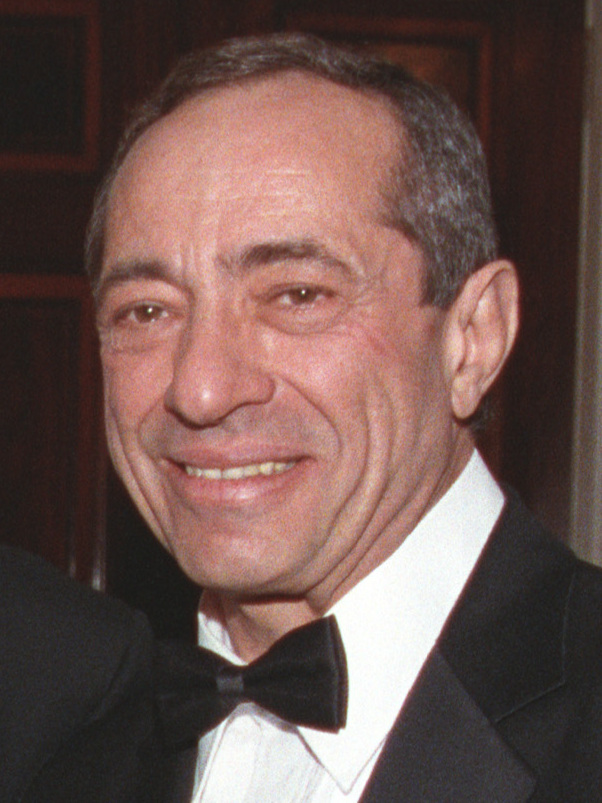
Nominee	George Pataki	Mario Cuomo
Party	Republican	Democratic
Alliance	Parties: Conservative; Tax Cut Now	Liberal
Running mate	Betsy McCaughey	Stan Lundine
Popular vote	2,538,702	2,364,904
Percentage	48.79%	45.45%
- County results Pataki: 40–50% 50–60% 60–70% 70–80% Cuomo: 50–60% 60–70% 70–80% 80–90%
Governor before election
Mario Cuomo
Democratic
Elected Governor
George Pataki
Republican

The 1994 New York gubernatorial election was an election for the state governorship held on November 8, 1994. Incumbent Democratic governor Mario Cuomo ran for a fourth term, but was defeated by Republican George Pataki in an upset victory. Pataki had previously been described by the New York Daily News as "a little-known Republican state senator." The conservative New York Post attributed the result to how voters "had grown tired of the 12-year incumbent Cuomo and his liberalism."

Pataki's victory was one of the most notable of the 1994 "Republican Revolution" midterm elections, which also ousted governors in Alabama, New Mexico, and Texas. This is the last time a governor of New York lost re-election. This would be the last gubernatorial race until 2022 that was decided by a single-digit margin. This is the only election (primary or general) where a member of the Cuomo family lost Staten Island.

== Democratic primary ==
=== Candidates ===
- Mario Cuomo, incumbent governor
- Lenora Fulani, activist and perennial candidate

==== Withdrew ====
- Roy Innis, national chair of the Congress of Racial Equality and 1993 candidate for New York City mayor

=== Campaign ===
Cuomo faced two primary challengers: Lenora Fulani, a perennial New Alliance Party candidate, and Roy Innis, national chair of the Congress of Racial Equality and a failed challenger to New York City mayor David Dinkins in the 1993 election. Innis ultimately failed to submit petition signatures. Fulani's bid was generally considered a Quixotic, losing effort. Cuomo refused to debate her, and Fulani made it plain that she sought to draw African Americans away from the Democratic Party. Adam Clayton Powell IV was the only elected official to endorse her candidacy, and Fulani was also far outstripped in fundraising.

=== Results ===
On September 13, 1994, Cuomo handily defeated Fulani.

Results by county Cuomo: 50–60%; 60–70%; 70–80%; 80–90%

1994 Democratic gubernatorial primary
Party	Candidate	Votes	%
Democratic	Mario Cuomo (incumbent)	548,762	79.45
Democratic	Lenora Fulani	141,918	20.55
Total votes		690,680	100.00

== Republican primary ==
=== Candidates ===
- Evan G. Galbraith, former U.S. ambassador to France
- Herbert London, founder of the Gallatin Divison of New York University and 1990 Conservative Party nominee for governor (also running as Conservative)
- George Pataki, state senator from Peekskill (also running as Conservative)
- Richard M. Rosenbaum, former chair of the New York Republican State Committee (also running as Independence Party candidate)

==== Withdrew ====
- Bill Green, former U.S. representative (endorsed Rosenbaum)

==== Declined ====
- J. Patrick Barrett, businessman and former chair of the New York Republican State Committee
- Al D'Amato, U.S. senator since 1981

Initially, U.S. senator Al D'Amato was expected to run as the Republican and Conservative nominee. He began to publicly criticize Cuomo in September 1993 when he claimed that New York had become "the taxasaurus and spendasaurus capital of the nation" during Cuomo's tenure. However, D'Amato decided not to run within the month, predicting (accurately) that his party could take control of the Senate in the 1994 elections, which would elevate him to chairman of the Senate Banking Committee.

Lewis Lehrman, the 1982 gubernatorial nominee who narrowly lost to Cuomo, also publicly flirted with a run, but ultimately didn't mount a candidacy. After considering other potential candidates, D'Amato and Republican chairman William Powers endorsed state senator George Pataki, a candidate who had potential to win support from the party's moderate and conservative factions.

Herbert London, who had run against the Republicans as the Conservative nominee in the prior election, declared his candidacy on October 5, 1993. He ran on a platform of tax cuts, reductions to state Medicaid and welfare payments, and social conservatism, criticizing both Cuomo and D'Amato. However, London's social conservatism and poor fundraising caused many party leaders to believe that he had no chance of defeating Cuomo.

On January 4, 1994, Manhattan businessman and former ambassador Evan Galbraith launched an exploratory bid. Galbraith had also previously been a candidate for governor in 1990, but a court had declared him eligible due to residency issues. The field was rounded out in March 1994, when Pataki entered the race officially with support from D'Amato and Powers. He was quickly followed by former U.S. representative Bill Green, who positioned himself as a moderate alternative to Pataki and London, and former party chair Richard Rosenbaum, who ran on a liberal Rockefeller Republican platform, calling for Medicaid financing of abortion and tighter restrictions on firearms. Former party chairman J. Patrick Barrett, a businessman from Syracuse, who was expected to join the race, declined on May 20 when he came to the conclusion that he could not obtain the necessary support at the state convention.

=== Campaign ===
==== Preconvention campaign ====
Pataki was opposed by Senate majority leader Ralph Marino over Pataki's association with the influential conservative, anti-tax advocacy group Change New York, which had worked to prevent Marino's reelection. Organizations on both sides of the abortion debate also criticized Pataki's moderate approach to the issue. Galbraith formally declared his candidacy on April 29; by this time, however, most conservatives had coalesced around either London or Pataki. Galbraith received endorsements from several notable figures including Henry Kissinger and William F. Buckley Jr. Galbraith supporters argued that he held similar positions to London but appealed to a larger base of voters.

Among the liberals, Richard Rosenbaum amassed a large campaign war chest of about $1.2 million. He decided against trying to secure an automatic ballot spot through the convention process because he did not believe he could attain the required 25 percent of the delegate vote. Instead, Rosenbaum opted to petition his way onto the ballot. Bill Green did enter the convention process, claiming to be conservative on fiscal issues and "sensibly compassionate" on social issues. His bid was badly damaged when Conservative Party chair Michael Long indicated that Conservatives were unlikely to support him if nominated, implicitly threatening a repeat of the 1990 election, in which the Conservatives had split the vote against Cuomo and nearly surpassed Republicans as the state's second party.

==== Convention results ====
At the Republican convention, Pataki won the overwhelming support of the delegates present. Herbert London, the runner-up, fell short of the 25% showing that he needed to obtain a place on the party's primary ballot.

1994 Republican state convention ballot
Party	Candidate	Votes	%
Republican	George Pataki	-	72.40
Republican	Herbert London		22.10
Republican	Evan Galbraith		2.80
Republican	Bill Green		2.60
Republican	Scattering		0.10
Total votes			100.00

==== Primary campaign ====
After losing the convention and failing to qualify for the ballot, London, Galbraith and Green each initially sought to petition their way onto the September 13 primary ballot, but efforts were made to dissuade them from doing so. London was nominated for the position of state comptroller, consolidating his support behind Pataki. On May 31, Green withdrew from the race and endorsed Rosenbaum.

==== Results ====
Pataki defeated Rosenbaum in the Republican primary easily. Although he had been nominated by the Independence Party of New York, Rosenbaum withdrew his candidacy and endorsed Pataki the next day.

1994 Republican gubernatorial primary
Party	Candidate	Votes	%
Republican	George Pataki	273,620	75.60
Republican	Richard M. Rosenbaum	88,302	24.40
Total votes		361,922	100.00

== Conservative primary ==
=== Candidates ===
- George Pataki, state senator from Peekskill (also running as Republican)
- Robert G. Relph Sr.

==== Withdrew ====
- Herbert London (also running as Republican; withdrew following defeat at Republican convention)

=== Results ===
1994 Conservative gubernatorial primary
Party	Candidate	Votes	%
Conservative	George Pataki	17,649	78.40
Conservative	Robert G. Relph Sr.	4,862	21.60
Total votes		22,511	100.00

== Independence nomination ==
=== Candidates ===
- Richard M. Rosenbaum, former chair of the New York Republican State Committee (also running as Republican)

=== Aftermath ===
After Rosenbaum withdrew as the nominee, businessman Tom Golisano was nominated and added to the general election ballot on September 28.

== Libertarian nomination ==
=== Candidates ===
- Joseph Brennan
- Dottie Lou Brokaw, nominee for lieutenant governor in 1990
- James Ostrowski, Buffalo attorney
- Norma Segal
- Howard Stern, radio shock jock and host of The Howard Stern Show

=== Campaign ===
New York City radio personality Howard Stern announced his candidacy for governor on his nationally syndicated radio show on March 22, 1994. Stern ran on a platform of reinstating capital punishment, letting road crews work only at night, staggering highway tolls to prevent traffic jams, and resigning from office as soon as these goals were accomplished.

=== Results ===
Stern won the party's nomination by a two-thirds majority on the first ballot at their state convention on April 23, 1994.

1994 Libertarian state convention ballot
Party	Candidate	Votes	%
Libertarian	Howard Stern	287	75.33
Libertarian	James Ostrowski	34	8.92
Libertarian	Norma Segal	24	6.30
Libertarian	Dottie Lou Brokaw	22	5.77
Libertarian	Joseph Brennan	10	2.63
Independent	Scattering	4	1.05
Total votes		381	100.00

=== Aftermath ===
Stern refused to file the financial disclosures required by law of any party seeking to hold public office. He filed suit against the state of New York, arguing that the applicable law violated his right to privacy and freedom of association. When the court denied his petition for an injunction, Stern called a press conference on August 4, 1994, and withdrew from the race. He was replaced by activist Robert L. Schulz.

== General election ==
=== Candidates ===
- Mario Cuomo, incumbent governor since 1983 (Democratic, Liberal)
  - Running mate: Stan Lundine, incumbnet lieutenant governor since 1987
- Tom Golisano, CEO and founder of Paychex (Independence)
- Lawrence Lane (Socialist Workers)
- George Pataki, state senator from Peekskill (Republican, Conservative, Tax Cut Now)
  - Running mate: Betsy McCaughey, Manhattan Institute editorialist and leading critic of the Clinton health care plan
- Robert L. Schulz, Queensbury political activist and tax protester (Libertarian)
  - Running mate: Stan Dworkin, former Rockland County legislator
- Robert T. Walsh (Right to Life)

==== Withdrew ====
- Richard M. Rosenbaum, former chair of the New York Republican State Committee (Independence) (withdrew September 14; endorsed Pataki)
- Howard Stern, radio shock jock and host of The Howard Stern Show (Libertarian) (withdrew August 4)

=== Campaign ===
Though early in the campaign, Cuomo led by as much as ten points, Pataki was eventually able to tie him due to his difficulty in defending his record. Pataki pledged to cut income taxes by 25 percent which appealed to voters in an economic downturn.

One key issue in the election was capital punishment. Cuomo was a staunch opponent, while Pataki supported it, and opinion polling showed that most New Yorkers agreed due to high crime rates over the prior two decades. Republican ads highlighted the case of Arthur Shawcross, a serial killer convicted of manslaughter who was paroled by New York in 1987 and committed additional murders while on release. This revelation caused a significant loss of support for Cuomo.

=== Polling ===
Source	Date	George Pataki (R)	Mario Cuomo (D)	Tom Golisano (IF)
Buffalo News	November 6, 1994	38%	42%	5%
Marist Institute	November 3, 1994	40%	43%	7%
New York Daily News	November 3, 1994	36%	50%	7%
New York Post/FOX-TV	November 2, 1994	32%	46%	-
Quinnipiac College	November 1, 1994	31%	44%	7%
The New York Times	October 31, 1994	34%	44%	-
New York Daily News/WNBC	October 30, 1994	42%	43%	-
New York Post/FOX-TV	October 30, 1994	40%	36%	-
The New York Times/WCBS-TV	October 7, 1994	44%	41%	-
Quinnipiac College	October 2, 1994	38%	42%	-
Marist Institute	October 2, 1994	44%	38%	-
WROC-TV/WIXT-TV	September 16, 1994	41%	35%	-
New York Post/Buffalo News	September 11, 1994	43%	41%	-

=== Results ===
While the race was very close overall, Pataki won by running up huge margins outside of New York City. Cuomo won only one county outside of the city, Albany, while also losing Staten Island for the first time.

New York Gubernatorial Election, 1994
Party	Candidate	Votes	%	±%
Republican	George Pataki	2,156,057	41.43%	+20.08%
Conservative	George Pataki	328,605	6.31%	−14.09%
Tax Cut Now	George Pataki	54,040	1.04%	N/A
Total	George Pataki	2,538,702	48.79%	+27.44%
Democratic	Mario Cuomo	2,272,903	43.68%	−7.74%
Liberal	Mario Cuomo	92,001	1.77%	+0.02%
Total	Mario Cuomo (incumbent)	2,364,904	45.45%	−7.72%
Independence	Tom Golisano	217,490	4.18%	N/A
Right to Life	Robert T. Walsh	67,750	1.30%	−2.10%
Libertarian	Robert L. Schulz	9,506	0.18%	−0.43%
Socialist Workers	Lawrence Lane	5,410	0.10%	−0.21%
Majority		173,798	3.34%	−28.49%
Turnout		5,203,762		
Republican gain from Democratic				

1994 New York governor election results in NYC by State Assembly district

==== New York City results ====
New York City subtotal
Party	Candidate	Votes	%
Republican	George Pataki	368,788	24.39%
Conservative	George Pataki	42,981	2.84%
Tax Cut Now	George Pataki	11,238	0.74%
Total	George Pataki	423,007	27.97%
Democratic	Mario Cuomo	1,007,747	66.63%
Liberal	Mario Cuomo	52,316	3.46%
Total	Mario Cuomo (incumbent)	1,060,063	70.09%
Independence	Tom Golisano	16,516	1.09%
Right to Life	Robert T. Walsh	9,943	0.66%
Libertarian	Robert L. Schulz	1,018	0.07%
Socialist Workers	Lawrence Lane	1,806	0.12%
Total votes		1,512,353	100%
