= 1982 New York gubernatorial election =

- November 2, 1982
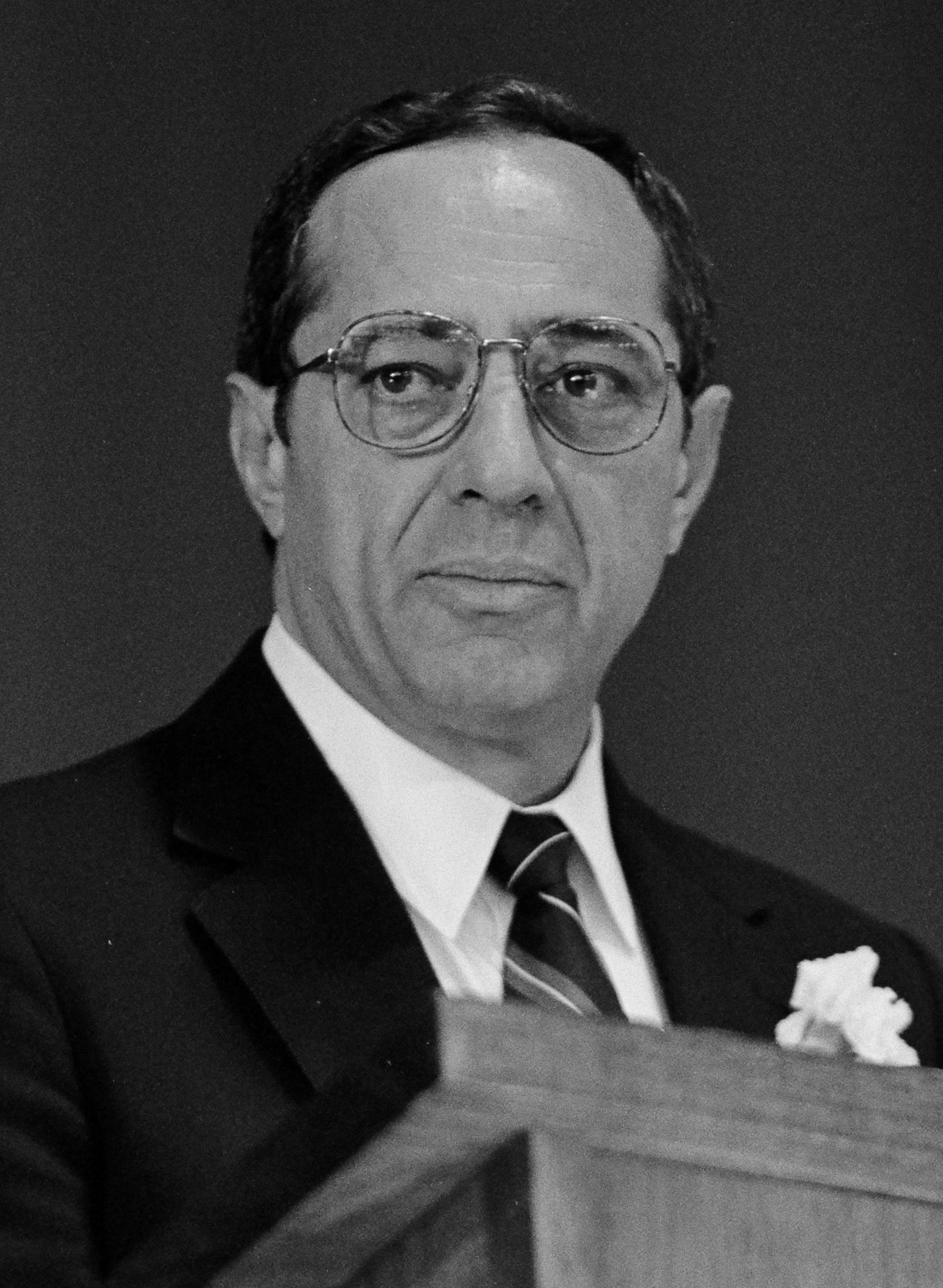

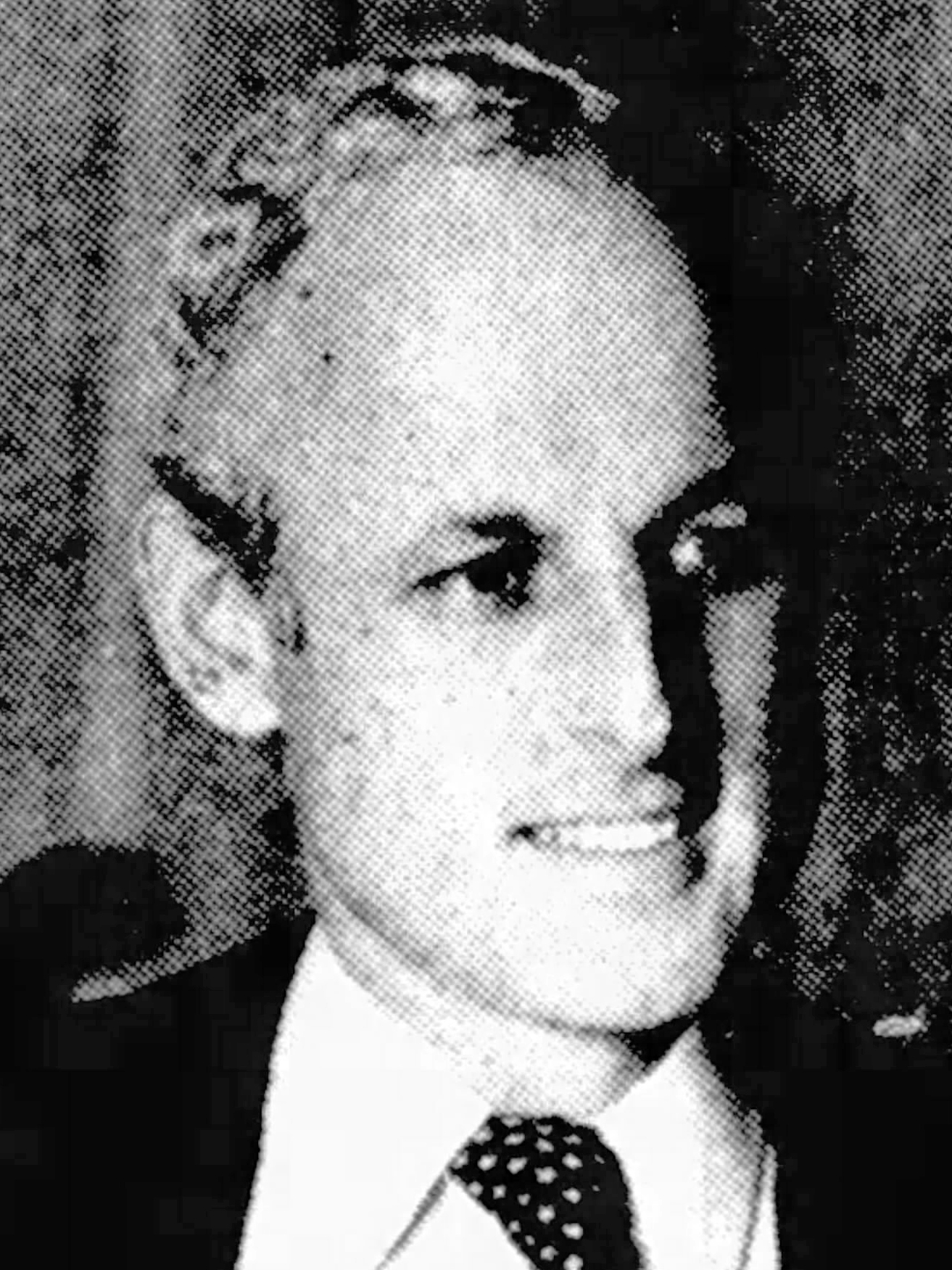
Nominee	Mario Cuomo	Lewis Lehrman
Party	Democratic	Republican
Alliance	Liberal	Conservative; Statewide Ind.
Running mate	Alfred DelBello	James L. Emery
Popular vote	2,675,213	2,494,827
Percentage	50.91%	47.48%
- County results Cuomo: 40–50% 50–60% 60–70% 70–80% Lehrman: 50–60% 60–70% 70–80%
Governor before election
Hugh Carey
Democratic
Elected Governor
Mario Cuomo
Democratic

The 1982 New York gubernatorial election was held on November 2, 1982, to elect the Governor and Lieutenant Governor of New York. Incumbent Democratic Governor Hugh Carey chose not to run for a third term, which resulted in an open race. Democratic lieutenant governor Mario Cuomo narrowly defeated Republican banker Lewis Lehrman, who ran as a conservative.

Both candidates had been considered unlikely victors of their respective parties' primaries. Cuomo had unexpectedly defeated New York City mayor Ed Koch, in a rematch of the 1977 mayoral election, to win the Democratic nomination. Cuomo was considered a political liberal who worked to revitalize the New Deal coalition. Entering the race as a political novice, Lehrman reportedly spent $7 million to boost his profile through advertising, beginning as early as January 1981. Lehrman ran a law and order campaign, referring to criminals as "savages" and pledging cuts to the state income tax.

Cuomo ultimately won a race described as "a classic left vs. right battle" by a 50.9 to 47.5 percent margin, buoyed by voters in New York City. Cuomo would go on to serve three terms in office before ultimately losing reelection in 1994.

== Democratic primary ==
=== Candidates ===
- Mario Cuomo, lieutenant governor and former New York secretary of state
- Ed Koch, mayor of New York City since 1978

==== Declined ====
- Robert Abrams, New York attorney general
- Carol Bellamy, president of the New York City Council
- Hugh Carey, incumbent governor since 1975

The Democratic primary shaped up as a rematch of the 1977 New York City mayoral election between Mario Cuomo and Ed Koch. In 1977, Koch narrowly won a Democratic primary runoff over Cuomo and then defeated Cuomo, who ran on the Liberal Party ticket, again in the general election. Since that race, Cuomo had been elected lieutenant governor in 1978 and Koch had been re-elected to a second term as mayor in 1981.

On January 15, Hugh Carey announced he would not stand for re-election to a third term amid low approval ratings and nascent challenges from within his own party, including by Cuomo. After Carey announced he would not run, Koch entered the race. Koch's decision discouraged Robert Abrams and Carol Bellamy from joining the race.

=== Campaign ===
Koch's status as the early front-runner was derailed by the publication of a 1981 interview he had given to Playboy, in which he exalted life in New York City and denigrated suburban and rural lifestyles by comparison. On a trip to Albany following its publication, Koch was booed loudly. He described the interview as "foolish" and apologized to upstate voters.

Both candidates emphasized their respective records. Cuomo differentiated himself by his opposition to capital punishment and attempted to link Koch to Republican politicians, including Ronald Reagan. Nevertheless, at the June party convention in Albany, Koch received the party's endorsement with 61 percent of the delegate vote.

Despite an early pledge of neutrality, Governor Carey endorsed Koch late in the campaign. Cuomo criticized Carey's decision and called Carey "a good governor and a lousy politician.''

=== Results ===
Results by county Cuomo: 50–60%; 60–70%; 70–80%; Koch: 50–60%; 60–70%; Tie: 50%

1982 Democratic gubernatorial primary
Party	Candidate	Votes	%
Democratic	Mario Cuomo	678,900	52.34%
Democratic	Ed Koch	618,247	47.66%
Total votes		1,297,147	100.00%

The New York Times called Cuomo's victory a "stunning upset" which relied on "an unusual coalition of liberal Democrats, labor, minorities and upstaters." Koch ran strongly in Jewish communities, but Cuomo won black, liberal, Irish and Italian voters by a similar margin. One key to Cuomo's victory was his strong showing in New York City itself. Although Koch won the city and its four suburban counties (Rockland, Westchester, Suffolk, and Nassau) as expected, Cuomo kept the margin close by winning half of the city's New York State Assembly districts and carrying Staten Island. Combined with large victories in nearly every upstate county, Cuomo won a solid majority.

Koch endorsed Cuomo immediately after the results were announced, declaring, "What's important to all of us is that we keep a Democrat in Albany."

== Republican primary ==
=== Candidates ===
- Paul J. Curran, former U.S. attorney for the Southern District of New York
- Lewis Lehrman, investment banker and former president of Rite Aid

==== Withdrew ====
- James L. Emery, New York Assembly minority leader (ran for lieutenant governor)
- Edward Regan, New York state comptroller (ran for re-election)
- Richard Rosenbaum, former chair of the New York Republican Party

=== Campaign ===
Lehrman spent heavily to raise his profile as a political novice. He spent over a year campaigning before the primary and spent a record $7 million (approximately $19,730,000 in 2025), more than half of which was his own money. He began running television advertisements in January 1981. Curran spent less than $500,000 (approximately $1,409,000 in 2025). The Harvard Crimson summarized Lehrman's unexpected rise to victory:

"Lehrman saturated the airwaves and took the Republican primary in a romp, reportedly spending more than $6 million of his own money for that initial race alone."

Lehrman was also boosted by the co-endorsement of the Conservative Party, which was said to "strongly influence" the primary as it had in 1978 by giving Lehrman a "head start" against the field. After he received the Conservative endorsement and it became evident the party would stick by Lehrman, Edward Regan dropped out of the race despite consensus that he was the leading candidate for the Republican nomination. Regan's decision may also have also been influenced by his reliance on Wall Street funding, which was largely devoted to Koch.

Lehrman utilized harsh rhetoric on the issue of crime, referring to criminals as "savages" and criticizing the Court of Appeals for deference to defendants. He pledged "systematic" cuts to the state income tax and raised the possibility of a sales tax reduction.

=== Results ===
1982 Republican gubernatorial primary
Party	Candidate	Votes	%
Republican	Lewis Lehrman	464,231	80.59%
Republican	Paul J. Curran	111,814	19.41%
Total votes		576,045	100.00%

== General election ==
=== Candidates ===
- Jane Benedict, tenants' rights activist (Unity)
  - Running mate: Angela Gilliam, political anthropology professor
- Robert J. Bohner, Garden City attorney (Right to Life)
  - Running mate: Paul F. Callahan, Garden City attorney
- Mario Cuomo, lieutenant governor of New York (Democratic, Liberal)
  - Running mate: Alfred DelBello, Westchester County Executive
- Lewis Lehrman, New York City investment banker (Conservative, Republican, Statewide Independent)
  - Running mate: James L. Emery, New York Assembly minority leader
- John H. Northrup, Syracuse accountant (Free Libertarian)
  - Running mate: David Hoesly, Rochester research engineer
- Nancy Ross, former member of New York City's third community school board (Note: From the 1970s until the early 2000s, all of New York City's public schools were partially decentralized under the control of dozens of community school boards.) (New Alliance)
  - Running mate: Lenora Fulani, Brooklyn psychologist
- Diane Wang, garment-center worker (Socialist Workers)
  - Running mate: Peter Thierjung, sheet-metal fabricator

=== Results ===
1982 New York gubernatorial election
Party	Candidate	Votes	%	±%
Democratic	Mario Cuomo	2,559,607	48.71%	N/A
Liberal	Mario Cuomo	115,606	2.20%	N/A
Total	Mario Cuomo	2,675,213	50.91%	-0.04%
Republican	Lewis Lehrman	2,248,741	42.80%	N/A
Conservative	Lewis Lehrman	230,153	4.38%	N/A
Statewide Ind.	Lewis Lehrman	15,933	0.30%	N/A
Total	Lewis Lehrman	2,494,827	47.48%	+2.26%
Right to Life	Robert J. Bohner	52,356	1.00%	−2.73%
Libertarian	John H. Northrup	16,913	0.32%	−0.08%
Unity	Jane Benedict	6,353	0.12%	N/A
New Alliance	Nancy Ross	5,277	0.10%	N/A
Socialist Workers	Diane Wang	3,766	0.07%	−0.20%
Total votes		5,254,705	100.00%	N/A
Democratic hold				
