= Independent voting movement =

The independent voting movement is a group of progressive, non-partisan, coalition of independent voters in the United States seeking to reform the two-party electoral process at all levels of government. The current primary organizing entity for the movement is the Unified Independents organization, unitedindependents.us. Their mission is described as "a coalition working to strengthen the connection and collaboration among hundreds of organizations and millions of Americans in the Independent political sector across the United States.".

As of January 2026, a record high of 45% of U.S. adults identified as independent.

== History ==
Although the current independent movement is not a political party, it has its roots in several, the most prominent being the New Alliance Party of New York City, the brainchild of Fred Newman. The NAP dissolved in 1994, and a number of its members, including Newman and activist Lenora Fulani joined the Independence Party of New York state (IPNY), whilst also, along with Jacqueline Salit, starting the Committee for a Unified Independent Party. Many of the CUIP founders were also involved, through various organizations, in the formation of the Reform Party in 1995, an outgrowth of Ross Perot's 1992 Presidential campaign. Members of the CUIP worked with the IPNY to successfully elect Michael Bloomberg mayor of New York City in 2001, 2005, and 2009, though it is unclear the extent of the participation. Today, the independent movement has many leading figures in New York, and New York City, and it has branched across the country to organize grassroots movements under its umbrella.

Christopher Life, founder of United Independents developed the organization through previous iterations of political reform entities including the One Nation party.

== Current organizations ==
United Independents is currently organizing independent voters and organizations through its Our House program and the Independent National Convention.

According to the organization's website the Independent National Convention (INC) is described as:

"The Flagship Gathering of the Independent Movement The Independent National Convention is the premier event for independents, reformers, and political outsiders. Produced by United Independents, INC is where leaders, activists, and organizations unite to build momentum, forge coalitions, and reimagine American democracy — beyond the two-party system."

== Affiliate groups ==
- AL, Independent Alabama
- AZ, Arizona Independents
- CA, IndependentVoice.org
- CT, Independent Party
- DE, Independent Party of Delaware
- FL, Florida Independentvoting.org
- GA, Georgia Independent Voters
- GA, iMove
- IA, Independent Voters of Iowa
- ID, American Independent Movement
- IL, United Independents of Illinois
- KY, Independent Kentucky (independentkentucky.org)
- MA, Massachusetts Coalition of Independent Voters
- MD, Independent Movement of Maryland
- MI, Grand Valley State College Independents
- MS, Committee for Open Primaries
- NC, North Carolina Independents
- NH, New Hampshire Independent Voters
- NJ, New Jersey Independent Voters https://www.facebook.com/newjerseyindependentvoters
- NV, Independent Voters of Nevada (IVON)
- NY, New York City Independence Party
- OH, Independent Ohio (independentohio.org)
- PA, Independent Pennsylvanians (paindependents.org)
- SC, Independence Party of South Carolina
- SD, South Dakota Voice of Independents
- TN, Independent Tennessee
- TX, Independent Texans
- UT, Utah League of Independent Voters
- VA, Virginia Independent Voters Association (VIVA)
- WA, Washington Association of Independent Voters (WAIV)
- WI, Wisconsin Group for an Independent Voice (WiGiv)
