= Newmanites =

Newmanites may refer to:

- followers of the Oxford Movement, led by John Henry Newman
- followers of Fred Newman, a Marxist psychologist and alleged cult leader
