= 1988 United States presidential election in Idaho =

- November 8, 1988

Nominee	George H. W. Bush	Michael Dukakis
Party	Republican	Democratic
Home state	Texas	Massachusetts
Running mate	Dan Quayle	Lloyd Bentsen
Electoral vote	4	0
Popular vote	253,881	147,272
Percentage	62.08%	36.01%
County results
Bush
40–50%
50–60%
60–70%
70–80%
80–90%
Dukakis
40–50%
50–60%
60–70%
President before election
Ronald Reagan
Republican
Elected President
George H. W. Bush
Republican

The 1988 United States presidential election in Idaho took place on November 8, 1988. All 50 states and the District of Columbia, were part of the 1988 United States presidential election. State voters chose four electors to the Electoral College, which selected the president and vice president.

Idaho was won by incumbent United States Vice President George H. W. Bush of Texas, who was running against Massachusetts Governor Michael Dukakis. Bush ran with Indiana Senator Dan Quayle as vice president, and Dukakis ran with Texas Senator Lloyd Bentsen. The election was very partisan for Idaho, with over 98% of the electorate voting for either the Democratic or Republican parties, and only four parties appearing on the ballot. All but one county gave either Dukakis or Bush an outright majority; the exception was Bonner County, which gave Bush a very narrow plurality. Bush's best county was Madison County, which gave him 84.87% of its vote—Bush's second-strongest county performance in the nation after the famous Unionist Republican bastion of Jackson County in Kentucky. Dukakis' best county was Shoshone County, where he received 60.49% of the vote.

Idaho weighed in for this election as 18% more Republican than the national average and with 62.08% of the popular vote. As a result, Idaho became the third-most Republican state in the nation, behind Utah and New Hampshire. Bush won Idaho by a powerful 26.1% margin; his 62.1% vote share made it his third-best state in the nation, after Utah and New Hampshire. The Mountain West as a whole had begun trending Republican from 1952 on, after having been a swing region that was critical to Democratic victories when they did occur between 1896 and 1948. However, the realignment was particularly pronounced in Idaho; in 1964, a mere 16 years after having backed Truman over Dewey, Idaho came within less than 2% of voting for Barry Goldwater, far closer than any other state in the region apart from Goldwater's native Arizona and indeed far closer than any other Johnson state anywhere apart from Florida.

In 1988, an election influenced by the 1980s farm crisis, several Mountain States (most notably Colorado and Montana) were shakier than usual in their support for the Republican ticket, but Idaho remained not only in the Republican column, but far more Republican than the nation overall. Bush dominated almost all of rural Idaho, and also scored strong wins in the population centers of Ada County (Boise), Canyon County (Nampa), Bonneville County (Idaho Falls), and Twin Falls County (Twin Falls), in all of which he exceeded 60% of the vote. He also won, albeit less powerfully, the other two of Idaho's six largest counties, Bannock (Pocatello) and Kootenai (Coeur d'Alene). However, Dukakis did manage to carry a cluster of counties in North Idaho, centered on the Silver Valley, a region historically dominated by mining.

Bush became the first Republican to win the White House without carrying Latah County since William McKinley in 1896. As of the 2024 presidential election, this is the last election in which Blaine County voted for a Republican presidential candidate.

== Results ==
1988 United States presidential election in Idaho
Party	Candidate	Votes	Percentage	Electoral votes
Republican	George H. W. Bush	253,881	62.08%	4
Democratic	Michael Dukakis	147,272	36.01%	0
Libertarian	Ron Paul	5,313	1.30%	0
Independent	Lenora Fulani	2,502	0.61%	0
Totals		408,968	100.00%	4

=== Results by county ===
County	George H.W. Bush Republican		Michael Dukakis Democratic		Ronald Paul Libertarian		Leonora Fulani Independent		Margin		Total votes cast
County	#	%	#	%	#	%	#	%	#	%	Total votes cast
Ada	54,951	62.92%	30,525	34.95%	1,289	1.48%	569	0.65%	24,426	27.97%	87,334
Adams	1,107	61.53%	643	35.74%	34	1.89%	15	0.83%	464	25.79%	1,799
Bannock	14,986	52.40%	13,074	45.71%	373	1.30%	168	0.59%	1,912	6.69%	28,601
Bear Lake	2,084	69.93%	867	29.09%	16	0.54%	13	0.44%	1,217	40.84%	2,980
Benewah	1,650	50.96%	1,518	46.88%	41	1.27%	29	0.90%	132	4.08%	3,238
Bingham	10,131	68.89%	4,346	29.55%	143	0.97%	85	0.58%	5,785	39.34%	14,705
Blaine	3,130	54.39%	2,498	43.41%	86	1.49%	41	0.71%	632	10.98%	5,755
Boise	1,044	61.05%	620	36.26%	31	1.81%	15	0.88%	424	24.79%	1,710
Bonner	5,721	49.94%	5,555	48.49%	125	1.09%	54	0.47%	166	1.45%	11,455
Bonneville	22,613	75.01%	7,032	23.33%	354	1.17%	148	0.49%	15,581	51.68%	30,147
Boundary	1,800	56.21%	1,336	41.72%	34	1.06%	32	1.00%	464	14.49%	3,202
Butte	899	62.26%	521	36.08%	18	1.25%	6	0.42%	378	26.18%	1,444
Camas	288	65.90%	136	31.12%	9	2.06%	4	0.92%	152	34.78%	437
Canyon	21,426	66.14%	10,207	31.51%	597	1.84%	166	0.51%	11,219	34.63%	32,396
Caribou	2,239	71.22%	867	27.58%	28	0.89%	10	0.32%	1,372	43.64%	3,144
Cassia	5,345	73.34%	1,833	25.15%	59	0.81%	51	0.70%	3,512	48.19%	7,288
Clark	281	66.75%	133	31.59%	2	0.48%	5	1.19%	148	35.16%	421
Clearwater	1,659	45.87%	1,861	51.45%	48	1.33%	49	1.35%	-202	-5.58%	3,617
Custer	1,253	66.09%	616	32.49%	17	0.90%	10	0.53%	637	33.60%	1,896
Elmore	3,756	63.46%	2,078	35.11%	61	1.03%	24	0.41%	1,678	28.35%	5,919
Franklin	2,992	77.29%	806	20.82%	42	1.08%	31	0.80%	2,186	56.47%	3,871
Fremont	3,401	73.11%	1,178	25.32%	50	1.07%	23	0.49%	2,223	47.79%	4,652
Gem	2,926	56.90%	2,064	40.14%	111	2.16%	41	0.80%	862	16.76%	5,142
Gooding	2,908	59.64%	1,872	38.39%	60	1.23%	36	0.74%	1,036	21.25%	4,876
Idaho	3,541	60.31%	2,198	37.44%	98	1.67%	34	0.58%	1,343	22.87%	5,871
Jefferson	5,295	79.64%	1,198	18.02%	126	1.90%	30	0.45%	4,097	61.62%	6,649
Jerome	3,830	64.32%	1,985	33.33%	102	1.71%	38	0.64%	1,845	30.99%	5,955
Kootenai	15,093	55.63%	11,621	42.83%	249	0.92%	167	0.62%	3,472	12.80%	27,130
Latah	6,367	48.47%	6,544	49.82%	134	1.02%	91	0.69%	-177	-1.35%	13,136
Lemhi	2,378	66.24%	1,157	32.23%	42	1.69%	13	0.52%	1,221	34.01%	3,590
Lewis	786	48.76%	807	50.06%	12	0.74%	7	0.43%	-21	-1.30%	1,612
Lincoln	918	60.20%	574	37.64%	22	1.44%	11	0.72%	344	22.56%	1,525
Madison	6,197	84.87%	1,009	13.82%	72	0.99%	24	0.33%	5,188	71.05%	7,302
Minidoka	4,623	65.73%	2,290	32.56%	75	1.07%	45	0.64%	2,333	33.17%	7,033
Nez Perce	7,027	46.78%	7,754	51.62%	137	0.91%	102	0.68%	-727	-4.84%	15,020
Oneida	1,269	70.11%	508	28.07%	30	1.66%	3	0.17%	761	42.04%	1,810
Owyhee	1,707	64.81%	848	32.19%	61	2.32%	18	0.68%	859	32.62%	2,634
Payette	3,786	65.17%	1,900	32.71%	79	1.36%	44	0.76%	1,886	32.46%	5,809
Power	1,838	61.66%	1,095	36.73%	28	0.94%	20	0.67%	743	24.93%	2,981
Shoshone	2,134	38.20%	3,379	60.49%	36	0.64%	37	0.66%	-1,245	-22.29%	5,586
Teton	982	64.31%	531	34.77%	8	0.52%	6	0.39%	451	29.54%	1,527
Twin Falls	13,243	63.87%	7,078	34.14%	263	1.27%	150	0.72%	6,165	29.73%	20,734
Valley	1,897	59.37%	1,251	39.15%	29	0.91%	18	0.56%	646	20.22%	3,195
Washington	2,380	61.98%	1,359	35.39%	82	2.14%	19	0.49%	1,021	26.59%	3,840
Totals	253,881	62.08%	147,272	36.01%	5,313	1.30%	2,502	0.61%	106,609	26.07%	408,968

==== Counties that flipped from Republican to Democratic ====
- Clearwater
- Lewis
- Latah
- Nez Perce
- Shoshone

== See also ==
- United States presidential elections in Idaho
- Presidency of George H. W. Bush
