= 1996 United States presidential election in New York =

- November 5, 1996
- Turnout: 47.47%

Nominee	Bill Clinton	Bob Dole	Ross Perot
Party	Democratic	Republican	Independence
Alliance	Liberal	Parties: Conservative; Freedom
Home state	Arkansas	Kansas	Texas
Running mate	Al Gore	Jack Kemp	Pat Choate
Electoral vote	33	0	0
Popular vote	3,756,177	1,933,492	503,458
Percentage	59.47%	30.61%	7.97%

Clinton
30–40%
40–50%
50–60%
60–70%
70–80%
80–90%
Dole
30–40%
40–50%
50–60%
60–70%
70–80%
Tie
President before election
Bill Clinton
Democratic
Elected President
Bill Clinton
Democratic

The 1996 United States presidential election in New York took place on November 5, 1996, as part of the 1996 United States presidential election. Voters chose 33 representatives, or electors to the Electoral College, who voted for president and vice president.

New York, a reliable blue state that no Republican presidential candidate has won since 1984, was won by incumbent Democratic President Bill Clinton of Arkansas and Vice President Al Gore of Tennessee, over the Republican ticket of Senator Bob Dole of Kansas and Representative Jack Kemp of New York. Clinton carried New York by a landslide 28.86% margin of victory, taking 59.47% of the vote to Dole's 30.61%, even though Republican vice presidential candidate Jack Kemp was from New York. Reform Party candidate Ross Perot finished in third, with 7.97% of the popular vote.

Clinton improved dramatically on his 1992 showing in New York, when he had won the state with a 49.7% plurality. 1996 firmly entrenched New York's status in the modern era as a Democratic stronghold, rather than the swing state it had been in the 20th century. Many historically powerfully Republican upstate counties were won by the Democratic ticket: As of the 2024 presidential election, this is the last time that a Democrat carried Cattaraugus, Chenango, Delaware, Fulton, Jefferson, Ontario, Schuyler, Yates, Chemung, Herkimer, Lewis, Oneida and Schoharie counties.

This is the first election since 1964 that the Democrat swept all five boroughs of New York City, which also occurred in 2000 and 2012. In this process of sweeping traditionally Republican suburbs around New York City, Clinton increased his lead in Westchester County – where he later moved in 2000 – from an 8.5% win in 1992 to a 21-point sweep in 1996. Many of these gains would be preserved in future elections: since 1996, no Democratic presidential candidate has received less than 55% of the vote in New York State, and only one has received less than 58%. Clinton's 28.86% victory margin is the second widest ever for a Democrat, only behind Lyndon Johnson's 37.25% in 1964, although several subsequent Democrats have received a higher vote share.

== Results ==
1996 United States presidential election in New York
Party	Candidate	Votes	Percentage	Electoral votes
Democratic	Bill Clinton	3,649,630	57.78%	
Liberal	Bill Clinton	106,547	1.69%	
Total	Bill Clinton (incumbent)	3,756,177	59.47%	33
Republican	Bob Dole	1,738,707	27.53%	
Conservative	Bob Dole	183,392	2.90%	
Freedom	Bob Dole	11,393	0.18%	
Total	Bob Dole	1,933,492	30.61%	0
Independence	Ross Perot	503,458	7.97%	0
Green	Ralph Nader	75,956	1.20%	0
Right to Life	Howard Phillips (Note: Howard Phillips was the nominee of the Constitution Party nationally.)	23,580	0.37%	0
Libertarian	Harry Browne	12,220	0.19%	0
Natural Law	John Hagelin	5,011	0.08%	0
Worker's World	Monica Moorehead	3,473	0.05%	0
Socialist Workers	James Harris	2,762	0.04%	0
Totals		6,316,129	100.0%	33
Voter turnout		47.47%		—

=== New York City results ===
1996 US president election results in NYC by State Assembly district

1996 presidential election in New York City		Manhattan	The Bronx	Brooklyn	Queens	Staten Island	Total	
Democratic- Liberal	Bill Clinton	394,131	248,276	432,232	372,925	64,684	1,512,248	77.10%
Democratic- Liberal	Bill Clinton	79.96%	85.80%	80.07%	72.94%	50.53%	1,512,248	77.10%
Republican- Conservative- Freedom	Bob Dole	67,839	30,435	81,406	107,650	52,207	339,537	17.31%
Republican- Conservative- Freedom	Bob Dole	13.76%	10.52%	15.08%	21.05%	40.78%	339,537	17.31%
Independence	Ross Perot	11,144	7,186	15,031	22,288	8,968	64,617	3.29%
Independence	Ross Perot	2.26%	2.48%	2.78%	4.36%	7.01%	64,617	3.29%
Green	Ralph Nader	15,969	1,727	7,802	4,599	1,040	31,137	1.59%
Green	Ralph Nader	3.24%	0.60%	1.45%	0.90%	0.81%	31,137	1.59%
Right to Life	Howard Phillips	723	784	1,175	1,535	554	4,771	0.24%
Right to Life	Howard Phillips	0.15%	0.27%	0.22%	0.30%	0.43%	4,771	0.24%
Libertarian	Harry Browne	1,536	242	653	727	207	3,365	0.17%
Libertarian	Harry Browne	0.31%	0.08%	0.12%	0.14%	0.16%	3,365	0.17%
Natural Law	John Hagelin	593	232	537	602	148	2,112	0.11%
Natural Law	John Hagelin	0.12%	0.08%	0.10%	0.12%	0.12%	2,112	0.11%
Worker's World	Monica Moorehead	615	290	520	547	107	2,079	0.11%
Worker's World	Monica Moorehead	0.12%	0.10%	0.10%	0.11%	0.08%	2,079	0.11%
Socialist Workers	James Harris	349	178	477	423	92	1,519	0.08%
Socialist Workers	James Harris	0.07%	0.06%	0.09%	0.08%	0.07%	1,519	0.08%
TOTAL		492,899	289,350	539,833	511,296	128,007	1,961,385	100.00%

=== Results by county ===
County	Bill Clinton Democratic		Bob Dole Republican		Ross Perot Independence		Ralph Nader Green		Various candidates Other parties		Margin		Total votes cast
County	#	%	#	%	#	%	#	%	#	%	#	%	Total votes cast
Albany	85,993	60.99%	39,785	28.22%	11,957	8.48%	2,071	1.47%	1,185	0.84%	46,208	32.77%	140,991
Allegany	6,621	37.40%	8,107	45.79%	2,730	15.42%	116	0.66%	129	0.73%	−1,486	−8.39%	17,703
Bronx	248,276	85.80%	30,435	10.52%	7,186	2.48%	1,727	0.60%	1,726	0.60%	217,841	75.28%	289,350
Broome	44,407	51.15%	31,327	36.09%	9,114	10.50%	1,308	1.51%	658	0.76%	13,080	15.06%	86,814
Cattaraugus	13,029	41.17%	12,971	40.99%	5,151	16.28%	184	0.58%	308	0.97%	58	0.18%	31,643
Cayuga	15,879	49.79%	11,093	34.78%	4,420	13.86%	234	0.73%	268	0.84%	4,786	15.01%	31,894
Chautauqua	26,831	47.67%	21,261	37.77%	7,484	13.30%	281	0.50%	433	0.77%	5,570	9.90%	56,290
Chemung	16,977	47.40%	14,287	39.89%	3,967	11.08%	192	0.54%	390	1.09%	2,690	7.51%	35,813
Chenango	8,797	45.63%	7,319	37.96%	2,822	14.64%	172	0.89%	169	0.88%	1,478	7.67%	19,279
Clinton	15,386	52.95%	9,759	33.58%	3,488	12.00%	153	0.53%	274	0.94%	5,627	19.37%	29,060
Columbia	12,910	47.11%	10,324	37.67%	3,466	12.65%	488	1.78%	215	0.78%	2,586	9.44%	27,403
Cortland	9,130	46.94%	7,606	39.11%	2,398	12.33%	194	1.00%	121	0.62%	1,524	7.83%	19,449
Delaware	8,724	44.98%	7,684	39.62%	2,601	13.41%	219	1.13%	166	0.86%	1,040	5.36%	19,394
Dutchess	47,339	45.60%	41,929	40.39%	12,294	11.84%	1,374	1.32%	885	0.85%	5,410	5.21%	103,821
Erie	224,554	54.74%	132,343	32.26%	45,679	11.13%	4,684	1.14%	2,974	0.72%	92,211	22.48%	410,234
Essex	7,893	46.47%	6,379	37.55%	2,363	13.91%	165	0.97%	186	1.10%	1,514	8.92%	16,986
Franklin	8,494	51.81%	5,072	30.94%	2,499	15.24%	109	0.66%	220	1.34%	3,422	20.87%	16,394
Fulton	9,779	46.28%	7,881	37.30%	3,214	15.21%	120	0.57%	136	0.64%	1,898	8.98%	21,130
Genesee	10,074	41.56%	10,821	44.64%	2,996	12.36%	131	0.54%	216	0.89%	−747	−3.08%	24,238
Greene	8,251	41.00%	8,712	43.29%	2,790	13.86%	208	1.03%	163	0.81%	−461	−2.29%	20,124
Hamilton	1,228	34.00%	1,841	50.97%	492	13.62%	24	0.66%	27	0.75%	−613	−16.97%	3,612
Herkimer	11,910	44.73%	10,085	37.88%	4,235	15.91%	174	0.65%	222	0.83%	1,825	6.85%	26,626
Jefferson	16,783	49.18%	12,362	36.22%	4,561	13.36%	159	0.46%	262	0.77%	4,421	12.96%	34,127
Kings	432,232	80.07%	81,406	15.08%	15,031	2.78%	7,802	1.45%	3,362	0.62%	350,826	64.99%	539,833
Lewis	4,402	43.22%	3,965	38.93%	1,669	16.39%	38	0.37%	111	1.09%	437	4.29%	10,185
Livingston	10,868	43.23%	10,981	43.68%	2,889	11.49%	205	0.82%	195	0.78%	−113	−0.45%	25,138
Madison	11,832	43.84%	11,324	41.96%	3,379	12.52%	220	0.82%	233	0.86%	508	1.88%	26,988
Monroe	164,858	53.18%	115,694	37.32%	23,936	7.72%	3,277	1.06%	2,229	0.72%	49,164	15.86%	309,994
Montgomery	10,485	49.54%	7,172	33.88%	3,253	15.37%	94	0.44%	162	0.77%	3,313	15.66%	21,166
Nassau	303,587	55.74%	196,820	36.14%	36,122	6.63%	4,345	0.80%	3,790	0.70%	106,767	19.60%	544,664
New York	394,131	79.95%	67,839	13.76%	11,144	2.26%	16,059	3.26%	3,816	0.77%	326,292	66.20%	492,989
Niagara	44,203	49.42%	31,438	35.15%	12,564	14.05%	611	0.68%	628	0.70%	12,765	14.27%	89,444
Oneida	44,399	46.77%	37,996	40.03%	11,296	11.90%	453	0.48%	785	0.83%	6,403	6.74%	94,929
Onondaga	100,190	51.40%	73,771	37.84%	17,602	9.03%	1,954	1.00%	1,422	0.73%	26,419	13.56%	194,939
Ontario	19,156	46.23%	17,237	41.60%	4,391	10.60%	349	0.84%	306	0.74%	1,919	4.63%	41,439
Orange	54,995	48.01%	45,956	40.12%	11,778	10.28%	921	0.80%	888	0.78%	9,039	7.89%	114,538
Orleans	6,233	40.82%	6,865	44.96%	1,986	13.01%	95	0.62%	89	0.58%	−632	−4.14%	15,268
Oswego	20,440	44.75%	17,159	37.57%	7,499	16.42%	280	0.61%	295	0.65%	3,281	7.18%	45,673
Otsego	11,470	47.54%	8,774	36.37%	3,217	13.33%	442	1.83%	223	0.92%	2,696	11.17%	24,126
Putnam	16,173	42.08%	17,452	45.41%	4,032	10.49%	447	1.16%	328	0.85%	−1,279	−3.33%	38,432
Queens	372,925	72.95%	107,650	21.06%	22,288	4.36%	4,509	0.88%	3,834	0.75%	265,275	51.89%	511,206
Rensselaer	34,273	50.68%	23,482	34.72%	8,405	12.43%	869	1.29%	596	0.88%	10,791	15.96%	67,625
Richmond	64,684	50.53%	52,207	40.78%	8,968	7.01%	1,040	0.81%	1,108	0.87%	12,477	9.75%	128,007
Rockland	63,127	56.24%	40,395	35.99%	6,798	6.06%	1,189	1.06%	732	0.65%	22,732	20.25%	112,241
St. Lawrence	21,798	56.65%	10,827	28.14%	5,309	13.80%	222	0.58%	321	0.83%	10,971	28.51%	38,477
Saratoga	39,832	46.50%	34,337	40.08%	10,141	11.84%	711	0.83%	644	0.75%	5,495	6.42%	85,665
Schenectady	35,404	53.07%	22,106	33.14%	7,865	11.79%	759	1.14%	575	0.86%	13,298	19.93%	66,709
Schoharie	5,902	44.51%	5,353	40.37%	1,796	13.54%	121	0.91%	89	0.67%	549	4.14%	13,261
Schuyler	3,303	43.26%	3,134	41.05%	1,037	13.58%	92	1.20%	69	0.90%	169	2.21%	7,635
Seneca	6,825	48.91%	5,004	35.86%	1,889	13.54%	126	0.90%	111	0.80%	1,821	13.05%	13,955
Steuben	14,481	37.94%	17,710	46.40%	5,496	14.40%	175	0.46%	309	0.81%	−3,229	−8.46%	38,171
Suffolk	261,828	51.83%	182,510	36.13%	52,209	10.33%	4,786	0.95%	3,880	0.77%	79,318	15.70%	505,213
Sullivan	15,052	53.29%	9,321	33.00%	3,453	12.23%	244	0.86%	174	0.62%	5,731	20.29%	28,244
Tioga	8,769	41.20%	9,416	44.24%	2,721	12.79%	219	1.03%	157	0.74%	−647	−3.04%	21,282
Tompkins	20,772	55.95%	11,532	31.06%	2,623	7.07%	1,854	4.99%	343	0.92%	9,240	24.89%	37,124
Ulster	35,852	48.55%	26,212	35.49%	9,246	12.52%	1,913	2.59%	628	0.85%	9,640	13.06%	73,851
Warren	11,603	43.31%	11,152	41.63%	3,623	13.52%	212	0.79%	201	0.75%	451	1.68%	26,791
Washington	9,572	42.46%	8,954	39.72%	3,648	16.18%	172	0.76%	198	0.88%	618	2.74%	22,544
Wayne	15,145	42.07%	15,837	44.00%	4,619	12.83%	153	0.43%	243	0.68%	−692	−1.93%	35,997
Westchester	196,310	56.92%	123,719	35.87%	18,028	5.23%	4,364	1.27%	2,442	0.71%	72,591	21.05%	344,863
Wyoming	5,735	36.25%	7,477	47.26%	2,411	15.24%	72	0.46%	126	0.80%	−1,742	−11.01%	15,821
Yates	4,066	43.59%	3,925	42.08%	1,190	12.76%	75	0.80%	71	0.76%	141	1.51%	9,327
Totals	3,756,177	59.47%	1,933,492	30.61%	503,458	7.97%	75,956	1.20%	47,046	0.74%	1,822,685	28.86%	6,316,129

==== Counties that flipped from Republican to Democratic ====
- Cattaraugus
- Chemung
- Chenango
- Clinton
- Columbia
- Delaware
- Dutchess
- Essex
- Fulton
- Herkimer
- Jefferson
- Lewis
- Madison
- Oneida
- Ontario
- Orange
- Oswego
- Richmond
- Saratoga
- Schoharie
- Schuyler
- Suffolk
- Warren
- Washington
- Yates

=== Results by congressional district ===
Clinton carried all 31 congressional districts, including 13 that elected Republicans.

District	Clinton	Dole	Perot
1st	50.9%	36.2%	11.1%
2nd	54.1%	34.2%	10.2%
3rd	53.2%	37.9%	7.4%
4th	57.3%	36.4%	6.3%
5th	59.9%	32.2%	6.0%
6th	86.3%	10.7%	3.0%
7th	67.8%	25.3%	5.1%
8th	77.0%	15.7%	2.7%
9th	65.8%	27.4%	4.8%
10th	89.9%	6.1%	1.7%
11th	90.4%	6.1%	1.3%
12th	84.7%	10.7%	2.4%
13th	51.5%	40.2%	6.7%
14th	70.3%	22.8%	3.2%
15th	90.8%	5.1%	1.6%
16th	94.6%	3.9%	1.5%
17th	86.3%	11.1%	2.6%
18th	58.2%	35.1%	4.9%
19th	48.4%	40.9%	8.6%
20th	53.9%	36.8%	7.5%
21st	57.5%	30.3%	10.2%
22nd	44.9%	40.0%	13.1%
23rd	46.0%	39.4%	13.0%
24th	49.9%	35.4%	14.7%
25th	50.6%	37.9%	9.8%
26th	51.3%	34.9%	10.7%
27th	43.1%	42.9%	11.2%
28th	54.9%	35.5%	7.2%
29th	51.3%	35.1%	11.9%
30th	57.3%	28.9%	11.7%
31st	44.0%	40.8%	13.6%

== See also ==
- United States presidential elections in New York
- Presidency of Bill Clinton
