= 1988 United States presidential election in New Hampshire =

- November 8, 1988

Nominee	George H. W. Bush	Michael Dukakis
Party	Republican	Democratic
Home state	Texas	Massachusetts
Running mate	Dan Quayle	Lloyd Bentsen
Electoral vote	4	0
Popular vote	281,537	163,696
Percentage	62.49%	36.33%

Bush
40–50%
50–60%
60–70%
70–80%
80–90%
90–100%
Dukakis
40–50%
50–60%
70–80%
President before election
Ronald Reagan
Republican
Elected President
George H. W. Bush
Republican

The 1988 United States presidential election in New Hampshire took place on November 8, 1988, as part of the 1988 United States presidential election, which was held throughout all 50 states and D.C. Voters chose four representatives, or electors to the Electoral College, who voted for president and vice president.

New Hampshire voted for the Republican nominee, Vice President George H. W. Bush, over the Democratic nominee, Massachusetts Governor Michael Dukakis, by a landslide margin of 26.16%. Bush took 62.49% of the vote to Dukakis's 36.33%.

Compared to the rest of liberal New England, New Hampshire historically had a strong fiscal conservative streak to its politics, and Bush's pledge not to raise taxes played well to the state's anti-tax electorate. This election would prove to be the GOP's high point in New Hampshire, as the state gave Bush his second-strongest win in the nation, behind only Utah.

In the following years, the state would drift to the left, though more on social issues than on economic issues. As the Republican Party moved to embrace the Christian right and became increasingly Southern, the GOP would suffer a rapid decline in its fortunes in New Hampshire. Despite the scale of Bush's victory in 1988, no Republican has since won even a majority of the state's votes, although his son George W. Bush would eke out a narrow 48–47 plurality in 2000.

As of the 2024 presidential election, this is the last election in which a Republican has been able to win every county within the state as well as the last time the counties of Cheshire, Grafton, Merrimack and Strafford voted for a Republican presidential candidate. This is also the last time that New Hampshire was won by double digits by either party, (although future Democratic candidates in both Bill Clinton, and later Barack Obama came incredibly close to doing so during their landslide victories in 1996, along with 2008).

== Primaries ==
- 1988 New Hampshire Republican presidential primary
- 1988 New Hampshire Democratic presidential primary

== Results ==
1988 United States presidential election in New Hampshire
Party	Candidate	Votes	Percentage	Electoral votes
Republican	George H. W. Bush	281,537	62.49%	4
Democratic	Michael Dukakis	163,696	36.33%	0
Libertarian	Ron Paul	4,502	1.00%	0
New Alliance	Lenora Fulani	790	0.18%	0
Totals		450,525	100.00%	4
Voter Turnout (Voting age/Registered)				55%/69%

=== Results by county ===
County	George H.W. Bush Republican		Michael Dukakis Democratic		Ron Paul Libertarian		Leonora Fulani New Alliance		Margin		Total votes cast
County	#	%	#	%	#	%	#	%	#	%	Total votes cast
Belknap	14,454	67.92%	6,603	31.03%	203	0.95%	20	0.09%	7,851	36.89%	21,280
Carroll	12,983	70.78%	5,153	28.09%	157	0.86%	51	0.28%	7,830	42.69%	18,344
Cheshire	15,002	54.53%	12,339	44.85%	125	0.45%	46	0.17%	2,663	9.68%	27,512
Coös	8,763	63.32%	4,981	35.99%	61	0.44%	35	0.25%	3,782	27.33%	13,840
Grafton	19,033	62.00%	11,484	37.41%	143	0.47%	39	0.13%	7,549	24.59%	30,699
Hillsborough	88,261	65.00%	45,799	33.73%	1,525	1.12%	193	0.14%	42,462	31.27%	135,778
Merrimack	29,535	60.66%	18,637	38.28%	433	0.89%	81	0.17%	10,898	22.38%	48,686
Rockingham	64,034	63.15%	35,775	35.28%	1,401	1.38%	195	0.19%	28,259	27.87%	101,405
Strafford	20,636	54.74%	16,547	43.89%	401	1.06%	114	0.30%	4,089	10.85%	37,698
Sullivan	8,836	57.82%	6,378	41.73%	53	0.35%	16	0.10%	2,458	16.09%	15,283
Totals	281,537	62.49%	163,696	36.33%	4,502	1.00%	790	0.18%	117,841	26.16%	450,525

== See also ==
- Presidency of George H. W. Bush
- United States presidential elections in New Hampshire
