= Richard Rosenbaum =

American lawyer and judge (1931–2019)

Richard Merrill Rosenbaum (April 8, 1931 – July 28, 2019) was an American lawyer, political activist, boxer, and author who served as a judge of the New York Supreme Court.

Rosenbaum was born in Oswego, New York, on April 8, 1931. He attended Cornell Law School, where he was the president of his class. After graduating from Cornell Law in 1955, he involved himself in local politics and in 1967, became the Monroe County Republican Party chairman. After stepping down from as county party chair to return to private practice in 1970, Rosenbaum was appointed later that year to the New York Supreme Court by Governor Nelson Rockefeller. In 1972, Justice Rosenbaum was elected by Rockefeller and his allies to be the chairman of the New York Republican Party, a role he served until 1977. He headed the New York delegation to the 1976 Republican National Convention where he delivered his state's delegates for Ford. He remained involved in politics and was an unsuccessful candidate for Governor of New York in 1982 and 1994.
