= Tax Cut Now Party =

Short-lived ballot line in New York

Tax Cut Now was a short-lived ballot line in New York. It was established by the New York Republican Party in 1994 to take advantage of New York's electoral fusion laws, providing Republican gubernatorial nominee George Pataki a ballot line that the Republican Party felt might attract Democratic voters in the 1994 New York gubernatorial election. The Tax Cut Now line gave Pataki a third ballot line, along with the Republican and Conservative Party of New York lines. Tax Cut Now was run in Albany, New York by the state Republican leadership. The ballot line was open only to Republican candidates, and its endorsements were identical to the Republican ballot line.

Because the line drew more than 50,000 votes in the election, which Pataki won, it became eligible to run candidates for the next four years. After the election, it was renamed the Freedom Party, which led to a conflict with Al Sharpton, who unsuccessfully attempted to take control of the ballot line after he withdrew his then ongoing copyright infringement lawsuit against the group. The ballot line did not nominate a candidate the 1998 gubernatorial election and folded as a result.
