= Dennis L. Serrette =

American politician (1940–2024)

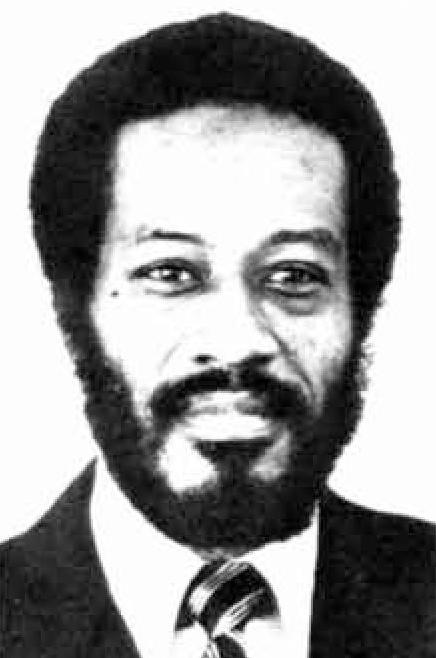
- Born: Dennis Louis Serrette; September 8, 1940; New York City, U.S.
- Died: March 7, 2024 (aged 83)
- Occupations: Politician, trade unionist
- Political party: New Alliance Party

Dennis Louis Serrette (September 8, 1940 – March 7, 2024) was an American civil and labor rights activist. He also was the New Alliance Party candidate for United States President in the 1984 presidential election.

== Biography ==
Serrette was born September 8, 1940, in Harlem, New York, where he was one of eleven children. As a late teen, Serrette joined the labor movement. During the Vietnam war era, he served with the U.S. Air Force.

Serrette was a union activist from 1964 on, and was a founding member of the Communication Workers of America (CWA) Black Caucus in 1971. In 1972 he became one of nineteen founding members of the Coalition of Black Trade Unionists, which advocated for the rights of minority workers. Serrette was recognized by the CWA for his contributions to the CBTU in 2001.

As a longtime activist and trade unionist, he led struggles in the Harlem community against the closing of Sydenham Hospital and chaired the Committee to save the Schomburg Center for Research in Black Culture.

Serrette donated an archive of materials to New York University, which can be found in the “Dennis Serrette Papers” special collection of the library. It includes materials related to his presidential campaign and work as a union activist.

== Labor movement ==
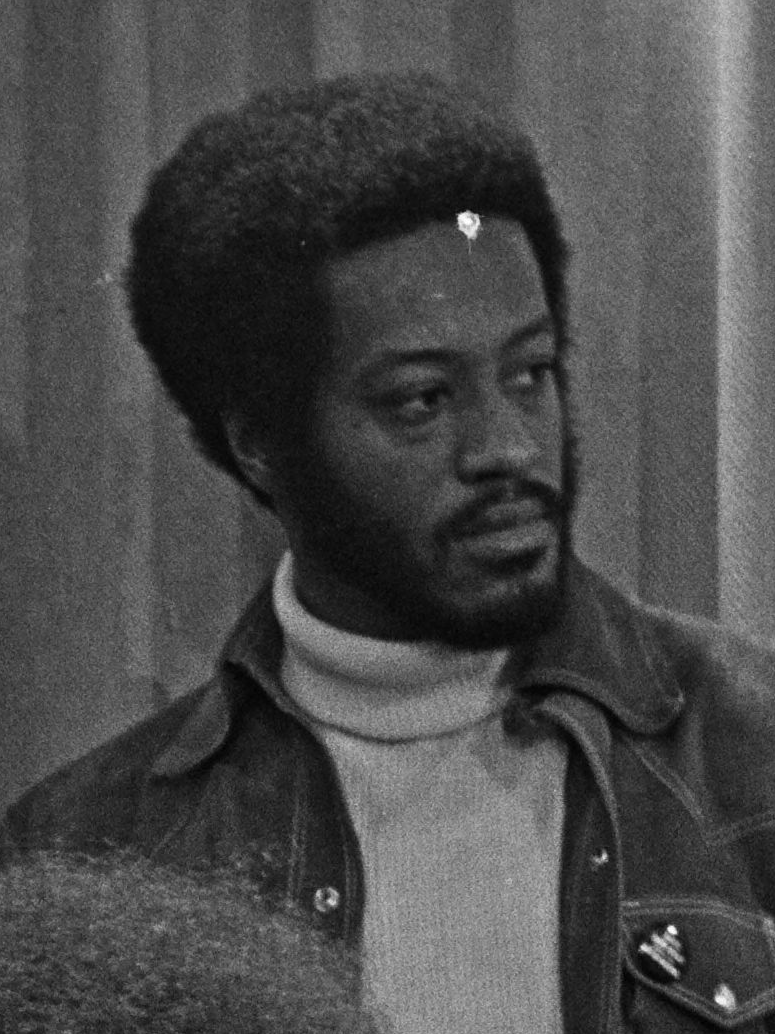
Serrette in 1975

Serrette was Vice President of CWA Local 1101 in New York City. He led the longest and most militant strike against the New York Telephone company, which lasted seven months (July 14, 1971, through February 16, 1972). In 1972 (while Vice President of the Local), Serrette (among other black leaders) sought for the AFL-CIO to recognize the Coalition of Black Trade Unionists (CBTU).

He also was the CWA’s Education Specialist, and in 2002 was the president of the United Association for Labor Education.

As a longtime activist and trade unionist, Serrette led struggles in the Harlem community against the closing of Sydenham Hospital, and chaired the Committee to save the Schomburg Center for Research in Black Culture.

== 1984 presidential run ==
Serrette’s presidential campaign began in 1983, four months before Jesse Jackson’s campaign began. At the time, he was working as a technician for the New York Telephone Company, and had been active with the union for over 20 years (especially organizing black workers). He was also divorced with seven children ages 1 to 22. Serrette took a leave from his job, running the campaign from his small apartment on West 102nd Street in New York.

Serrette was first recruited as a presidential candidate by the Consumer Party of Pennsylvania's chairman, Max Weiner. He was later recruited by Peter Diamondstone, chairman of the Liberty Union Party of Vermont.

Serrette believed that only an independent party (not working with either major party) could make the changes needed to help black people. Serrette described his platform as “people before profits”, favoring a “jobs-for-all” policy, and providing additional support for housing, health care, and social programs.

His goal was not to win the election, but more to help draw voters away from the major parties. Serrette also sought to help build a black-led party, which could nominate Jesse Jackson for president in the 1988 election.

His campaign was grassroots, where he met many voters in their homes. Serrette gained support in Chicago and Mississippi. As a presidential candidate, his running mate was Nancy Ross, a Jewish activist and former schoolteacher from Queens who ran for Governor in 1982.

He was on the ballot in 33 states and received 46,809 votes in the 1984 Presidential election, or .05 percent of the popular vote. Serrette was critical of the New Alliance Party and their operations after the election and left the group.
