= War chest =

Metaphor for a collection of tools or money

A war chest is a metaphor for any collection of tools or money intended to be used in a challenging or dangerous situation. Historically, it referred to an actual chest located in the homes or barracks of soldiers or military leadership, in which arms and armor were stored. Traveling armies, such as that of Hannibal, collected the spoils of war and used them to negotiate with others to resolve conflicts through economic exchange rather than violence. In the modern era, the term refers to amassed funds, expertise, and/or equipment which allows a person or organization to survive a challenging situation.

== Etymology ==
The term's modern meaning originates with the medieval practice of having a chest, literally, filled with money to open in time of war.

== In politics ==
In politics, a war chest is funding obtained from donors well in advance of a campaign, usually accumulated by an incumbent for either re-election or to contest a more advanced office, or provided by a wealthy candidate to their own campaign. The possession of such excess funds may discourage otherwise viable candidates from a primary or general election challenge.

== In business ==
In business a war chest, or cash mountain is a stash of money set aside to deal with unexpected changes in the business environment, or to use when expansion possibilities arise.

Today companies can use accumulated cash or rely on quickly raised debt which costs less to carry when you do not need it. This is not always a reasonable substitute, as the credit available to a company typically drops as a result of the same actions that require the war chest to be opened.

Companies can redistribute their war chests to shareholders by issuing larger or special dividends, or more commonly through share buyback operations. Companies do this because if actually held in cash, the companies will be earning a low rate of return in the money markets, whereas they could be using the funds to invest in more profitable projects. If they continue not to invest the funds, shareholders may sell the company's shares and make it vulnerable to a takeover. This would place the current management's jobs at risk.

== In professional sports ==
In club association football, it refers to the transfer budget that the club's manager has been allotted for acquisition of new players by the club's chairman, board of directors, owner or investors.

== Related terms ==
Similar terms are also referred to as surplus cash, cash reserves, emergency reserves, acquisition funds, rainy day funds, or undistributed earnings within different contexts.
