= New Alliance Party =

- Founded: 1979
- Dissolved: Mid-1990s
- Succeeded by: Patriot Party
- Ideology: Left-wing populism Left-wing nationalism Socialist feminism Revolutionary socialism Minority rights Anti-Zionism
- Political position: Far-left
- International affiliation: International Workers Party
- Colors: Magenta

The New Alliance Party (NAP) was an American political party formed in New York City in 1979. Its immediate precursor was an umbrella organization known as the Labor Community Alliance for Change, whose member groups included the Coalition of Grass Roots Women and the New York City Unemployed and Welfare Council. These groups were all associated with controversial psychologist and political activist Fred Newman, whose radical healthcare collectives, Centers for Change and Marxist International Workers Party, were active in grassroots politics in New York City.

The NAP's first chairperson was then-South Bronx City Councilman Gilberto Gerena-Valentin, a veteran political activist from Puerto Rico. The party is notable for getting African-American psychologist Lenora Fulani on the ballot in all 50 states during her first presidential campaign in 1988, making her both the first African-American and woman to do so.

== History ==
=== Background and ideas ===
From 1974 to 1979, Fred Newman acquired some experience in politics managing the International Workers Party. The New Alliance Party was founded as an independent electoral party for the purpose of creating new alliances among groups marginalized by the American electoral process, namely people of color, the LGBT community, progressives, and women. The NAP described itself as "pro-socialist". The party supported the PLO and was antagonistic to the state of Israel; it also worked with Nation of Islam.

=== 1981 Dump Koch campaign ===
The New Alliance Party's first impact on New York City politics was its participation in the early stages of the "Dump Koch" movement, which focused on then-Mayor Edward I. Koch, a former liberal Congressman who had moved steadily toward the right.

=== 1984 presidential election ===
During the 1984 presidential election, the NAP made its debut on the presidential campaign scene. Its candidate was Dennis L. Serrette, an African-American union activist who would later leave the NAP alleging questionable methods used by Newman and others. Serrette's running mate was Nancy Ross, a NAP leader who had served on a community school board on Manhattan's Upper West Side.

In 1985, the NAP began an unusual political relationship with Jesse Jackson. While Newman was initially dismissive of Jackson, Fulani had praised the popular activist during his 1984 presidential run. After Jackson founded his Rainbow Coalition group, Newman and Fulani created the Rainbow Alliance, which lobbied for the benefit of small political parties. The Rainbow Alliance later changed its name to the Rainbow Lobby and expanded its scope to include opposing the US-backed dictatorships of Joseph Mobutu in Zaire and Prosper Avril in Haiti. When asked about his political relationship with Fulani in the press, Jackson claimed that there was no relationship at all. The Rainbow Lobby continued its lobbying activities into the early 1990s while Fulani repeatedly rebuked Jackson for his support of the Democratic Party.

=== 1988 presidential election ===
The 1988 presidential election was a major step for the NAP. The Fulani campaign ran under the slogan "Two Roads are Better than One", supporting Jesse Jackson's campaign within the Democratic Party while launching Fulani's own run designed to challenge the African-American community to sever their historic relationship with the Democratic Party and embrace an independent path. In the previous election, the NAP was able to secure ballot spots in only 33 states. For the 1988 election, NAP pursued every avenue possible to gain ballot access, including attempts to gain the nomination of small independent parties which existed around the country, such as the Solidarity Party in Illinois. Fulani had six different running mates in different states, including Joyce Dattner and, in Oregon only, Harold Moore, each of whom represented "different constituencies". When asked which one would become vice president if she won, Fulani answered: "If elected, [they would] figure it out." Fulani's vote total throughout the country was 217,221, or 0.2% of the vote, coming in fourth place. She was the second-most successful third-party presidential candidate that year, behind Libertarian Ron Paul. Also in the 1988 election, the NAP ran candidates for other offices, including US Senate candidates in Connecticut, Massachusetts, Pennsylvania, and Nebraska. Though the party had its strongest roots in the east coast, the best result for the NAP was in Nebraska, where independent state senator Ernie Chambers received 1.6% of the vote.

In 1990, Fulani ran unsuccessfully for governor of New York. She was endorsed by Nation of Islam leader, minister Louis Farrakhan, who had been politically involved with Jesse Jackson's 1988 campaign only to be dropped at the recommendation of Jackson's campaign advisors. This was in the wake of Farrakhan being characterized in the press as antisemitic, as well as Jackson's gaffe wherein he called New York City "Hymietown". Fulani and Newman embraced Farrakhan, eliciting the anger of the Anti-Defamation League. In the wake of this criticism, Fulani moderated a historic conference on Black–Jewish relations, featuring the Jewish Marxist Newman conversing with African-American activist Reverend Al Sharpton.

=== 1992 presidential election ===
During the 1992 presidential election, Fulani again ran for president on the NAP ticket. Maria Elizabeth Muñoz, a Chicano activist, was chosen as her running mate. Muñoz had previously run for Senate and governor in California on Peace and Freedom Party tickets. Fulani lost the party's nomination to Ron Daniels of Jesse Jackson's Rainbow Coalition. Fulani also entered the New Hampshire primary for the Democratic Party presidential nomination in 1992, gaining some press coverage for her frequent heckling of Bill Clinton's campaign appearances after she was excluded from the New Hampshire Democratic debates. In 1992, the NAP also ran some candidates in other races, including US Senate candidates in Arizona, Illinois, Indiana, and New York. The best-performing NAP Senate presidential candidate was Mohammad T. Mehdi in New York, who came in fourth place with 0.8% of the vote.

=== Dissolution ===
By the mid-1990s, the NAP and its weekly newspaper The National Alliance had been disbanded. In 1994, Fulani and Newman joined the Patriot Party for a period, one of many groups which competed for control over Ross Perot's Reform Party in the years to come. The same year, Fulani and former The National Alliance editor Jacqueline Salit formed the Committee for a Unified Independent Party, an organization dedicated to bringing various independent groups together to challenge the bipartisan nature of American politics. The Fulani and Newman operatives later became associated with the Independence Party of New York.

== Election results ==
=== Presidential tickets ===
Year	Presidential candidate	Vice presidential candidate	Popular votes	%	Electoral votes	Result	Ballot access	Notes	Ref
1992	Lenora Fulani	Maria Elizabeth Muñoz	73,622	0.07%	0	Lost			
1988	Lenora Fulani	6 running mates (Note: In 1988, Fulani's running mates varied by state and included: Joyce Dattner, Wynonia Burke, and Harold F. Moore)	217,221	0.24%	0	Lost			
1984	Dennis L. Serrette	Nancy Ross	46,853	0.05%	0	Lost			

== See also ==
- Newmanites
