= Lenora Fulani =

American academic and activist

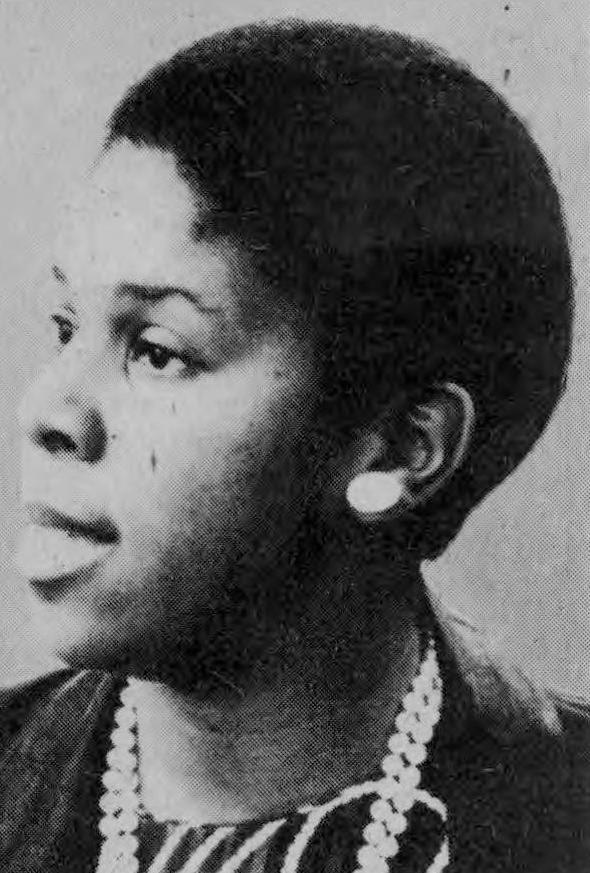
- Born: Lenora Branch; April 25, 1950 (age 76); Chester, Pennsylvania, U.S.
- Education: Hofstra University
- Occupations: Psychotherapist, psychologist, political activist
- Political party: New Alliance Party (1988–1992), Independence Party of New York, Reform

Lenora Branch Fulani (born April 25, 1950) is an American psychologist, psychotherapist, and political activist. She is best known for her presidential campaigns and development of youth programs serving minority communities in the New York City metropolitan area. In the 1988 United States presidential election heading the New Alliance Party ticket, she became the first woman and the first African American to achieve ballot access in all fifty states. Fulani's political concerns include racial equality, gay rights, and political reform, specifically to encourage third parties.

Fulani has worked closely since 1980 with Fred Newman, a New York–based psychotherapist and political activist who has often served as her campaign manager. Newman developed the theory and practice of Social Therapy in the 1970s, founding the New York Institute for Social Therapy in 1977. Along with psychologist Lois Holzman, Fulani has worked to incorporate the social therapeutic approach into youth-oriented programs, most notably the New York City–based All Stars Project, which she co-founded in 1981.

Fulani joined activists who supported Ross Perot for president in the 1992 United States presidential election in a national effort to create a new pro-reform party. In 1994 she led the formation of the Committee for a Unified Independent Party (CUIP). For years Fulani was active with Newman's version of the International Workers Party (IWP). Since then, she has been active with the Independence Party of New York.

== Early life ==
Fulani was born Lenora Branch in 1950 in Chester, Pennsylvania, the youngest daughter of Pearl, a registered nurse, and of Charles Branch, a railway baggage handler. Her father died of pneumonia when she was 12. As a teenager in Chester in the 1960s, Fulani was active in her local Baptist church, where she played piano for the choir. She graduated from Chester High School.

In 1967, Fulani was awarded a scholarship to study at Hofstra University in New York. She graduated in 1971, and went on to earn a master's degree from Columbia University's Teachers College. In the late 1970s, she earned a PhD in developmental psychology from the City University of New York (CUNY). Fulani was a guest researcher at Rockefeller University from 1973 to 1977, with a focus on how learning and social environment interact for African-American youth.

In college, she became involved in black nationalist politics, along with her then-husband, Richard. Both had adopted the name of the West African people Fulani as a surname when they married in a traditional West African ceremony. During her studies at City University, Fulani became interested in the work of Fred Newman and Lois Holzman, who had recently formed the New York Institute for Social Therapy and Research. Fulani studied at the Institute in the early 1980s.

== Electoral politics ==
Fulani became active in the Newman-founded independent New Alliance Party (NAP) and emerged as a spokesperson who often provoked controversy. In 1982, Fulani ran for New York Lieutenant Governor on the NAP ticket. She has also been involved in the affiliated (or, some say, secret) Independent Workers Party, the Rainbow Alliance, and other shifting groups that were led by Newman.

She helped to recruit the NAP's 1984 presidential candidate Dennis L. Serrette, an African-American trade union activist. Although he was quite involved with the party for years, Serrette left and published critical accounts of what he described as its cultic operation.

Fulani ran for president in 1988 as the candidate of the New Alliance Party. She received almost a quarter of a million votes or 0.2% of the vote. She was, at the same, the first African-American, independent, and female presidential candidate on the ballot in all 50 states. In the 1990 New York gubernatorial election, Fulani ran as a New Alliance candidate. She was endorsed that year by Nation of Islam leader Louis Farrakhan. She received 31,089 votes for 0.77% of the total vote.

Although in 1987, Fulani and Newman began an alliance with minister and activist Al Sharpton, he ran for the US Senate from New York as a Democrat, rather than as an independent. After that, Sharpton has kept his distance from both Fulani and Newman.

Fulani again ran as the New Alliance candidate in the 1992 presidential election, this time receiving 0.07% of the vote. She chose former Peace and Freedom Party activist Maria Elizabeth Muñoz as her vice-presidential running mate. Muñoz ran on the NAP ticket for the offices of US senator and California governor. In 1992 Fulani self-published her autobiography The Making of a Fringe Candidate, 1992.

In 1994, Fulani and Newman became founding members of the Patriot Party, one of the many groups that later competed for control of the Reform Party, which was founded by Ross Perot. She also joined with Jacqueline Salit to start the Committee for a Unified Independent Party (CUIP), which was formed to bring together independent groups to challenge the bipartisan hegemony in American politics.

During the 2000 presidential election, Fulani surprisingly endorsed Pat Buchanan, who was then running on the Reform Party ticket. In the municipal election of 2003, Fulani was among those who endorsed Bloomberg's proposed amendment to the New York City Charter to establish nonpartisan elections. Although Bloomberg spent $7 million of his own money to promote the amendment, voters rejected it.

In September 2005, the State Executive Committee of the Independence Party of New York dropped Fulani and other members from the New York City chapter. That was part of a fierce power struggle that brewed between members from Upstate New York and Long Island, and Newman, Fulani, and the other members based in New York City. Most party members were disaffected by the ideology of Newman and Fulani. The party's state chairman, Frank MacKay, a former ally of Fulani, claimed the action to have followed Fulani's refusal to repudiate an earlier statement that many considered to be antisemitic. According to The New York Times, "In 1989, Dr. Fulani wrote that the Jews 'had to sell their souls to acquire Israel' and had to 'function as mass murderers of people of color' to stay there." She refused to disavow these comments in 2005. Fulani said that she did not intend the statement as antisemitic but wanted to raise issues that she believed needed to be explored. She has, however, since repudiated the remarks, which she characterized as "excessive" and publicly apologized to "any people who had been hurt by them."

Citing the antisemitism allegations, Independence Party State chairman Frank MacKay initiated proceedings to have nearly 200 Independence Party members in New York City expelled from the party. Each case that MacKay brought to the New York State Supreme Court was dismissed. In one instance, Manhattan Supreme Court Justice Emily Jane Goodman wrote that the charges were "more political than philosophical."

Fulani formed a coalition to organize Independence Party support for the re-election campaign of Bloomberg. The local press described the coalition as composed of "union officials, clergy, sanitation workers, police officers, firefighters, district leaders and others who work at the grassroots level." Spirited defenses of Fulani have appeared in the city's black press; writing in the Amsterdam News, columnist Richard Carter wrote "there is little doubt that the main reason for the negative press, which, by the way, is not unusual for this brilliant, outspoken political strategist, is because she is a strong, no-nonsense Black woman. So strong she makes the city's political establishment and lockstep white news media nervous."

== Community work ==
Fulani has worked on a number of community outreach and youth development projects. In 1984, she helped found the Castillo Cultural Center in New York City, which produces mostly plays written by Newman, in an unusual arrangement. In 1998, the Castillo Center merged with the All Stars Project youth charity and broadened the single base for Newman's work. Fulani has been active in the development of educational programs associated with the All Stars Project, including the Joseph A. Forgione Development School for Youth and the All Stars Talent Show Network, which create enriching experiences outside of schools for poor inner-city youth, using a performance model. Fulani described her approach in Derrick Bell's 2004 book Silent Covenants: Brown V. Board of Education and the Unfulfilled Hopes for Racial Reform:

We teach young people to use performance skills to become more cosmopolitan and sophisticated—to interact with the worlds of Wall Street, with business and the arts. In becoming more cosmopolitan—in going beyond their narrow and parochial and largely nationalistic identities—they acquire a motivation to learn as a part of consistently creating and recreating their lives.

In 2004, the Anti-Defamation League criticized the All Stars/Castillo theater troupe for its play Crown Heights and accused the playwright of blaming the riots on the Jewish community. The play dramatized events of the 1991 riots in Crown Heights, Brooklyn, after a motorcade of the Lubavitcher rabbi accidentally killed a seven-year-old black Caribbean-American child. The accident ignited long-standing tensions in the community; in street violence, a visiting Australian rabbinical student, Yankel Rosenbaum, was stabbed to death by Lemrick Nelson, a 16-year-old Crown Heights youth.

A local Brooklyn paper described the play favorably.

== Criticism ==
Newman and Fulani's leadership, as well as various manifestations of the political party, such as the International Workers Party (IWP), have been strongly criticized by former members through the years, including party candidate Dennis Serrette and five-year member Marina Ortiz. In addition, Political Research Associates published a critical report on the NAP in 1987 that was updated in 2008 in which Ortiz accused Newman and Fulani of manipulating followers with "psychopolitical cultism."

After working with Fulani for several years, Serrette, who also had a personal relationship with her, has questioned his experience and publicly criticized Newman and Fulani's leadership of the party and its members: "it was clearly a tactical... a racist scheme of using Black and Latino and Asian people to do the bidding of one man, namely Fred Newman, that's my opinion, and to use other whites as well, you know through the therapy practices."

After he raised his concerns internally, Serrette said his treatment by other NAP leaders worsened dramatically. He also questioned the way in which therapy was used in the political work: "therapy was a way of getting people to not only operate in an organizational way but also a way of controlling every aspect of their lives.... you certainly couldn't straighten anybody out. But it was certainly effective in terms of controlling a lot of people to do the kinds of things that were asked of them.... they would do anything, just about, that he would ask them to do."

In an article published after he left the NAP, Serrette stated:

I knew when I joined NAP that it was not black-led, and I knew when I left it was not black-led. It took longer to understand that NAP was not even a progressive organization as it also pretends. Be that as it may, I probably still would not take the time to write about the organization. However, as a long-time activist who made the mistake of joining NAP, and who served on the organization's "Central Committee," I believe I have a responsibility to reveal the intense psychological control and millions of dollars Fred Newman employs to get well-meaning individuals in our communities (they target the black community), to viciously attack black leaders, black institutions, and progressive organizations for purposes of building Newman's power base.

Fulani dismissed his charges as related simply to the end of their personal relationship. In her self-published autobiography, The Making of a Fringe Candidate, 1992 (1992), Fulani wrote that Serrette frequently fought with black women in the New Alliance Party and would "criticize and ridicule" them for their relationship to Newman.

== Bibliography ==
- The Psychopathology of Everyday Racism and Sexism, Taylor & Francis Group, 1988, ISBN 0-918393-51-5

Party political offices
Preceded by Dennis L. Serrette	New Alliance Party Presidential candidate 1988 (lost), 1992 (lost)	Succeeded by None
Preceded by Nancy Ross	New Alliance Party New York Gubernatorial candidate 1986 (lost), 1990 (lost)	Succeeded by None
Preceded by First	New Alliance Party New York Lieutenant Gubernatorial candidate 1982 (lost)	Succeeded by Rafael Mendez
