= 1984 United States presidential election =

Re-election of Ronald Reagan

- November 6, 1984

538 members of the Electoral College 270 electoral votes needed to win
- Opinion polls
- Turnout: 55.2% (▲1.0 pp)

Nominee	Ronald Reagan	Walter Mondale
Party	Republican	Democratic
Home state	California	Minnesota
Running mate	George H. W. Bush	Geraldine Ferraro
Electoral vote	525	13
States carried	49	1 + DC
Popular vote	54,455,472	37,577,352
Percentage	58.8%	40.6%
- Presidential election results map. Red denotes states won by Reagan/Bush and blue denotes those won by Mondale/Ferraro. Numbers indicate electoral votes cast by each state and the District of Columbia.
President before election
Ronald Reagan
Republican
Elected President
Ronald Reagan
Republican

A presidential election was held in the United States on November 6, 1984. Incumbent Republican president Ronald Reagan and his running mate, incumbent vice president George H. W. Bush, were re-elected to a second term; they defeated the Democratic ticket of former vice president Walter Mondale and New York congresswoman Geraldine Ferraro in a landslide.

President Reagan and Vice President Bush faced only token opposition from former Minnesota Governor Harold Stassen in their bid for party re-nomination. Mondale faced a competitive field in his bid, defeating Colorado senator Gary Hart, activist Jesse Jackson, and several other candidates in the Democratic primaries. He eventually chose New York representative Geraldine Ferraro as his running mate, the first woman to be on a major party's presidential ticket.

Reagan touted a strong economic recovery from the 1970s stagflation and the 1981–1982 recession, and the widespread perception that his presidency had overseen a revival of national confidence and prestige. At 73, Reagan was the oldest person to be nominated by a major party for president, a record that stood until 2020, when both major-party candidates were older. The Reagan campaign produced effective television advertising and deftly neutralized concerns regarding Reagan's age. Mondale criticized Reagan's supply-side economics and budget deficits. He called for the reduction of U.S. public debt, a nuclear freeze, and ratification of the Equal Rights Amendment.

Reagan won re-election carrying 525 electoral votes, 49 states, and 58.8% of the popular vote. Mondale won 13 electoral votes: 10 from his home state of Minnesota, which he won by a narrow margin of 0.18% (3,761 votes), and 3 from the District of Columbia, which has always voted overwhelmingly for the Democratic candidate. Reagan won the second-largest share of the Electoral College since 1820 (second only to Franklin D. Roosevelt in 1936 and the largest for a Republican), and the most raw electoral votes ever received by a candidate.

As of 2026, Reagan is the last Republican to sweep all of New England and the only presidential nominee to win all the New England and Southern states since the effectively uncontested election of 1820. This is the most recent election in which any candidate won the popular vote by double digits and more than 500 electoral votes. It is also the most recent election in which the losing major party candidate failed to win at least 100 electoral votes. At the time, Reagan received the most popular votes in history, a record that stood until it was broken by both major party candidates in 2004. He remains the last two-term Republican president to win the popular vote in both of his successful runs. (Note: Republicans George W. Bush and Donald Trump were both elected to two terms as president (consecutive for Bush and non-consecutive for Trump), winning both the Electoral College and the popular vote for their second terms, after they won the Electoral College while losing the popular vote for their first terms.)

== Background ==
Ronald Reagan entered the presidency with an unemployment rate of 7.3% and it peaked at 10.6% in December 1982. The United States had a negative gross domestic product growth in 1982. The Republicans performed poorly in the 1982 elections. Dwight D. Eisenhower, John F. Kennedy, Richard Nixon, and Jimmy Carter lost an average of 12 seats in the United States House of Representatives in their first midterm. The Republicans lost 26 seats in the House elections. The Republicans lost seven governorships as well. Reagan's approval rating fell to 35% by January 1983. Polling showed him losing to Democratic candidates, including Walter Mondale and John Glenn; however, unemployment fell to 7.7% by March 1984, and Reagan's approval rating was at 54% in January 1984. His approval rating was aided by the 1983 Beirut barracks bombings and the invasion of Grenada. Polling by CBS News and The New York Times in January 1984 showed him leading Mondale by 16%.

== Nominations ==
=== Republican Party candidates ===
Republican Party (United States) 1984 Republican Party ticket
Ronald Reagan	George H. W. Bush
for President	for Vice President
40th President of the United States (1981–1989)	43rd Vice President of the United States (1981–1989)
Campaign

==== Primaries ====
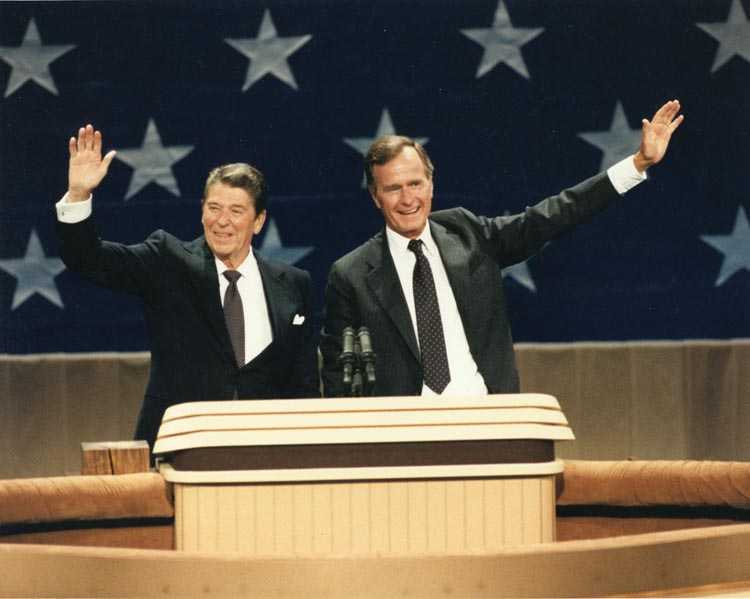
President Reagan and Vice President Bush at the 1984 Republican National Convention in Dallas

Reagan-Bush '84, under the leadership of Ed Rollins, was organized on October 17, 1983. Reagan delayed his campaign announcement as not running would make him a lame duck whereas running would make everything he did be viewed as part of his campaign. He announced that he would seek re-election on January 29, 1984.

Vice President George H. W. Bush and U.S. Senate Majority Leader Howard Baker were considered as possible candidates only if Reagan did not run. Former Minnesota governor Harold Stassen opposed Reagan for the Republican nomination and criticized the President's foreign policy, the budget deficit, and the trade imbalance. Reagan was the first incumbent president since Richard Nixon in 1972 to face no significant opposition for renomination. The popular vote from the Republican primaries was as follows:

- Ronald Reagan (inc.): 6,484,987 (98.6%)
- Unpledged delegates: 41,411 (0.6%)
- Others: 21,643 (0.3%)
- "Ronald Reagan No": (Note: Wisconsin's primary ballot offered voters the options "Ronald Reagan Yes," "Ronald Reagan No," and "Others") 14,047 (0.2%)
- Harold E. Stassen: 12,749 (0.2%)
- David Kelly: 360
- Gary Arnold: 252
- Benjamin Fernandez: 202

==== Endorsements ====
List of Ronald Reagan endorsements

Reagan had received endorsements from:

Celebrities

- Morey Amsterdam
- Pat Boone
- Ron Ely
- Cary Grant
- Charlton Heston
- Fred MacMurray
- Hugh O'Brian
- Jerry Reed
- Joan Rivers
- Arnold Schwarzenegger
- Frank Sinatra
- Jaclyn Smith
- Robert Stack
- James Stewart
- Stephanie Zimbalist

Reagan was renominated by a vote of 2,233 delegates (two delegates abstained). For the only time in American history, the vice presidential roll call was taken concurrently with the presidential roll call. Vice President George H. W. Bush was overwhelmingly renominated. This was the last time in the 20th century that the vice-presidential candidate of either major party was nominated by roll call vote.

Balloting
Presidential ballot		Vice presidential ballot	
Ronald Reagan	2,233	George H. W. Bush	2,231
Abstaining	2	Abstaining	2
		Jack Kemp	1
		Jeane Kirkpatrick	1

=== Democratic Party candidates ===
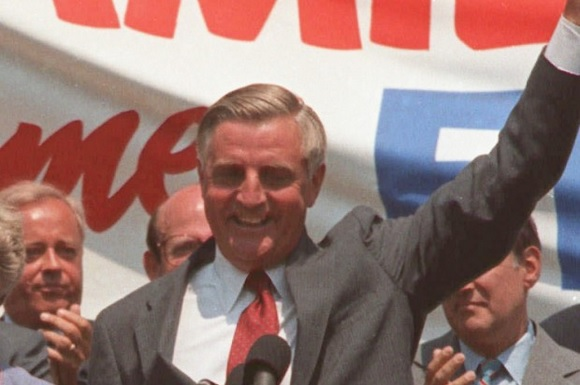
Mondale campaigning in Pennsylvania

Democratic Party (United States) 1984 Democratic Party ticket
Walter Mondale	Geraldine Ferraro
for President	for Vice President
42nd Vice President of the United States (1977–1981)	U.S. Representative from New York (1979–1985)
Campaign

Candidates in this section are sorted by date of withdrawal from the primaries
Gary Hart	Jesse Jackson	John Glenn	George McGovern	Reubin Askew	Fritz Hollings	Alan Cranston
U.S. Senator from Colorado (1975–1987)	President of the Rainbow Coalition from Illinois (1983–2023)	U.S. Senator from Ohio (1974–1999)	U.S. Senator from South Dakota (1963–1981)	Governor of Florida (1971–1979)	U.S. Senator from South Carolina (1966–2005)	U.S. Senator from California (1969–1993)
Campaign	Campaign	Campaign	Campaign	Campaign	Campaign	Campaign
Eliminated at Convention: July 18, 1984; Endorsed Mondale: July 19, 1984; 6,504,842 votes	Eliminated at Convention: July 18, 1984; Endorsed Mondale: August 28, 1984; 3,282,431 votes	Withdrew: March 16, 1984; Endorsed Mondale: July 18, 1984; 617,909 votes	Withdrew: March 14, 1984; Endorsed Mondale: June 13, 1984; 334,801 votes	Withdrew: March 1, 1984; Endorsed Mondale: July 18, 1984; 52,759 votes	Withdrew: March 1, 1984; Endorsed Hart: March 9, 1984; 33,684 votes	Withdrew: February 29, 1984; Endorsed Mondale: July 18, 1984; 51,437 votes

==== Primaries ====
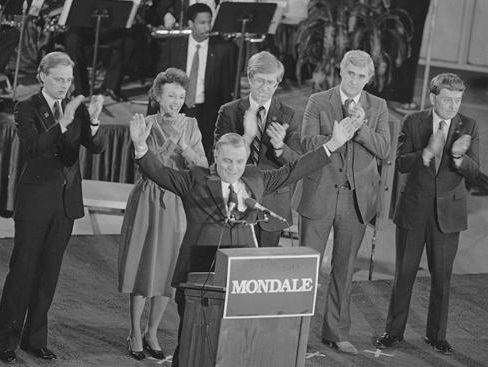
Mondale celebrates his victory in the Iowa caucus.

Only three Democratic candidates won any state primaries: Mondale, Hart, and Jackson. Initially, Massachusetts Senator Ted Kennedy, after a failed bid to win the 1980 Democratic nomination for president, was considered the de facto front-runner of the 1984 primary. However, Kennedy announced in December 1982 that he did not intend to run. Former Vice President Mondale was then viewed as the favorite to win the Democratic nomination. Mondale had the largest number of party leaders supporting him, and he had raised more money than any other candidate. However, both Jackson and Hart emerged as surprising, and troublesome, opponents.

South Carolina Senator Ernest Hollings's wit, experience, and call for a budget freeze all won him some positive attention, but his relatively conservative record alienated liberal Democrats, and he was never really noticed in a field dominated by Mondale, John Glenn, and Gary Hart. Hollings dropped out two days after losing badly in New Hampshire and endorsed Hart a week later. His disdain for his competitors was at times showcased in his comments. He notably referred to Mondale as a "lapdog", and to former astronaut Glenn as "Sky King" who was "confused in his capsule."

California Senator Alan Cranston hoped to galvanize supporters of the nuclear freeze movement that had called on the United States to halt the deployment of existing nuclear weapons and the development of new ones. Glenn and Askew hoped to capture the support of moderate and conservative Democrats. None of them shared Mondale's fundraising prowess nor Hart's or Jackson's grassroots support, however, and none won any contests.

Jackson was the second African-American (after Shirley Chisholm) to mount a nationwide campaign for the presidency, and he was the first black candidate to contend seriously. He got 3.5 million votes during the primaries, third behind Hart and Mondale. He won the primaries in Virginia, South Carolina, and Louisiana, and split Mississippi, where there were two separate contests for Democratic delegates. Through the primaries, Jackson helped confirm the black electorate's importance to the Democratic Party in the South at the time. During the campaign, however, Jackson made an off-the-cuff reference to Jews as "Hymies" and New York City as "Hymietown", for which he later apologized. Nonetheless, the remark was widely publicized, and derailed his campaign for the nomination. Jackson ended up winning 21% of the national primary vote but received only 8% of the delegates to the national convention, and he initially charged that his campaign was hurt by the same party rules that allowed Mondale to win. He also poured scorn on Mondale, saying that Hubert Humphrey was the "last significant politician out of the St. Paul-Minneapolis" area.

Hart, from Colorado, was a more serious threat to Mondale, and after winning several early primaries it looked as if he might take the nomination away from Mondale. Hart finished a surprising second in the Iowa caucuses, with 16.5% of the vote. This established him as the main rival to Mondale, effectively eliminating John Glenn, Ernest Hollings and Alan Cranston as alternatives. Hart criticized Mondale as an "old-fashioned" Great Society Democrat who symbolized "failed policies" of the past. Hart positioned himself (just as Bill Clinton would eight years later) as a younger, fresher, and more moderate Democrat who could appeal to younger voters. He emerged as a formidable candidate, winning the key New Hampshire, Ohio, and California primaries as well as several others, especially in the West. However, Hart could not overcome Mondale's financial and organizational advantages, especially among labor union leaders in the Midwest and industrial Northeast.

Hart was also badly hurt in a televised debate with Mondale during the primaries, when the former vice president used a popular television commercial slogan to ridicule Hart's vague "New Ideas" platform. Turning to Hart on camera, Mondale told Hart that whenever he heard Hart talk about his "New Ideas", he was reminded of the Wendy's fast-food slogan "Where's the beef?" The remark drew loud laughter and applause from the viewing audience and caught Hart off-guard. Hart never fully recovered from Mondale's charge that his "New Ideas" were shallow and lacking in specifics.

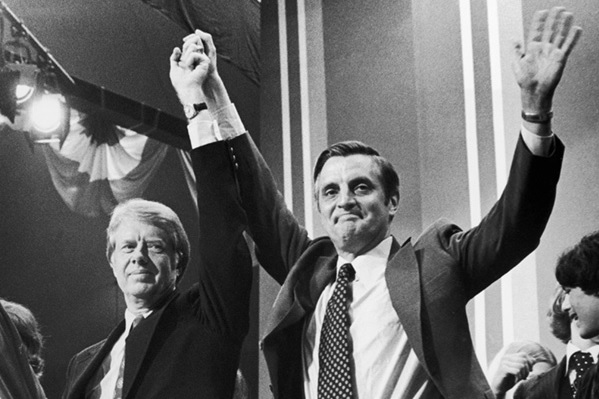
Walter Mondale and Jimmy Carter (under whom Mondale had previously served as vice president) clasp hands on the final day of the Democratic National Convention in New York City, 1976.

At a roundtable debate between the three remaining Democratic candidates moderated by Phil Donahue, Mondale and Hart got into such a heated argument over the issue of U.S. policy in Central America that Jackson had to tap his water glass on the table to help get them to stop.

Mondale gradually pulled away from Hart in the delegate count, but, as Time reported in late May, "Mondale ... has a wide lead in total delegates (1,564 to 941) ... because of his victories in the big industrial states, his support from the Democratic Establishment and the arcane provisions of delegate-selection rules that his vanguard helped draft two years ago." After the final primary in California, on June 5, which Hart won, Mondale was about 40 delegates short of the total he needed for the nomination. However, at the Democratic National Convention in San Francisco on July 16, Mondale received the overwhelming support of the unelected superdelegates from the party establishment to win the nomination.

Mondale's nomination marked the second time since the nomination of former governor of Georgia Jimmy Carter in 1976, and the fourth time since the nomination of former Representative John W. Davis in 1924, that the Democratic Party nominated a private citizen for president (i.e., someone not serving in an official governmental role at the time of the nomination and election). Mondale was the last private citizen to be nominated for president by the Democratic Party until former Secretary of State Hillary Clinton in 2016. He was also the last former vice president to be nominated for president until Joe Biden in 2020.

This race for the Democratic Party presidential nomination was the closest in two generations, and, as of 2024, it was the last occasion that a major party's race for the presidential nomination went all the way to its convention.

==== Endorsements ====
Note: These are only those endorsements that occurred during or before the primary race.

List of Walter Mondale endorsements

Mondale had received endorsements from:

United States House of Representatives

- Representative Jim Bates of California
- Representative Edward Boland of Massachusetts
- Representative Rick Boucher of Virginia
- Representative Joseph D. Early of Massachusetts
- Representative Barney Frank of Massachusetts
- Representative Robert García of New York
- Representative Sam Gejdenson of Connecticut
- Representative Tom Harkin of Iowa
- Representative Joe Moakley of Massachusetts
- Representative Charles B. Rangel of New York
- Representative William R. Ratchford of Connecticut
- Representative James Michael Shannon of Massachusetts

Governors and State Constitutional officers

- New York Attorney General Robert Abrams
- Governor Mario Cuomo of New York
- Lieutenant Governor Zell Miller of Georgia

Former officeholders

- Former President Jimmy Carter of Georgia

Former diplomats, board members and other officials

- Former Secretary of State Dean Rusk of Georgia

Organizations and unions

- AFL–CIO
- Alabama Democratic Conference
- National Education Association
- National Organization for Women

Current and former state and local officials and party officeholders
Alabama

- Mayor Richard Arrington, Jr. of Birmingham

California

- Mayor and 1982 Democratic Gubernatorial nominee Tom Bradley of Los Angeles

Georgia

- State Senator Julian Bond

Illinois

- Former Alderman, President of the City Council, 1983 mayoral candidate, and Cook County Democratic Party Chairman Edward Vrdolyak of Chicago

Michigan

- Mayor Coleman Young of Detroit
List of Gary Hart endorsements

Hart had received endorsements from:

United States House of Representatives

- Representative Patricia Schroeder of Colorado
- Representative Chuck Schumer of New York
- Representative and 1976 Democratic presidential candidate Mo Udall of Arizona
- Representative Henry A. Waxman of California

Celebrities, political activists, and political commentators

- Actor and director Warren Beatty
List of Jesse Jackson endorsements

Jackson had received endorsements from:

United States House of Representatives

- Delegate Walter E. Fauntroy of Washington, D.C.

Former officeholders

- Former Representative and 1972 Democratic presidential candidate Shirley Chisholm of New York
- Former Governor Orval E. Faubus of Arkansas

Current and former state and local officials and party officeholders
Alabama

- State Senator Michael Figures
- Mayor Johnny Ford of Tuskegee
- State Senator Earl Hilliard
- State Senator Hank Sanders

Georgia

- State Representative Tyrone Brookes

Illinois

- Mayor Carl Officer of East St. Louis

Indiana

- Mayor Richard G. Hatcher of Gary

Washington, D.C.

- Mayor Marion Barry of Washington, D.C.

Organizations and unions

- Church of God in Christ
- Nation of Islam
- National Baptist Convention of America, Inc.
- National Baptist Convention, USA, Inc.
- National Farmers Alliance
- National Hispanic Leadership Conference

Celebrities, political activists, and political commentators

- Muhammad Ali
- 1980 presidential nominee of the Citizens Party Barry Commoner
List of Ernest F. Hollings endorsements

Hollings had received endorsements from:

United States Senate

- Former U.S. Senator Birch Bayh of Indiana
- Former U.S. Senator William B. Spong, Jr. of Virginia

State Constitutional officers

- Lieutenant Governor Martha Griffiths of Michigan
- State Senator Anna Belle Clement O'Brien of Tennessee
- Lieutenant Governor Nancy Stevenson of South Carolina
List of John Glenn endorsements

Glenn had received endorsements from:

United States Senate

- Senator Sam Nunn of Georgia
- Senator Jim Sasser of Tennessee
- Senator Paul Tsongas of Massachusetts

United States House of Representatives

- Representative Jerry Huckaby of Louisiana

Governors and State Constitutional officers

- Lieutenant Governor Bill Baxley of Alabama
- Governor Chuck Robb of Virginia

Current and former state and local officials and party officeholders
Georgia

- Commissioner of Agriculture Tommy Irvin

Texas

- State Representative Larry Walker

Celebrities

- Actor and director Warren Beatty
List of Alan Cranston endorsements

Cranston had received endorsements from:

United States House of Representatives

- Representative William Lehman of Florida
List of Reubin Askew endorsements

Askew had received endorsements from:

United States Senate

- Senator Lawton Chiles of Florida

United States House of Representatives

- Representative William V. Chappell, Jr. of Florida
- Representative Dante Fascell of Florida
- Representative Sam Gibbons of Florida
- Representative Dan Mica of Florida

Governors and State Constitutional officers

- Governor Bob Graham of Florida

Current and former state and local officials and party officeholders
Florida

- Mayor Eva Mack of West Palm Beach

==== Convention ====
This was the convention's nomination tally:

Balloting
Presidential ballot		Vice presidential ballot	
Walter F. Mondale	2,191	Geraldine A. Ferraro	3,920
Gary W. Hart	1,200.5	Shirley Chisholm	3
Jesse L. Jackson	465.5		
Thomas F. Eagleton	18		
George S. McGovern	4		
John H. Glenn	2		
Joe Biden	1		
Lane Kirkland	1		

When he made his acceptance speech at the Democratic Convention, Mondale said: "Let's tell the truth. Mr. Reagan will raise taxes, and so will I. He won't tell you. I just did." Although Mondale intended to expose Reagan as hypocritical and position himself as the honest candidate, the choice of raising taxes as a discussion point likely damaged his electoral chances.

==== Vice-presidential nominee ====
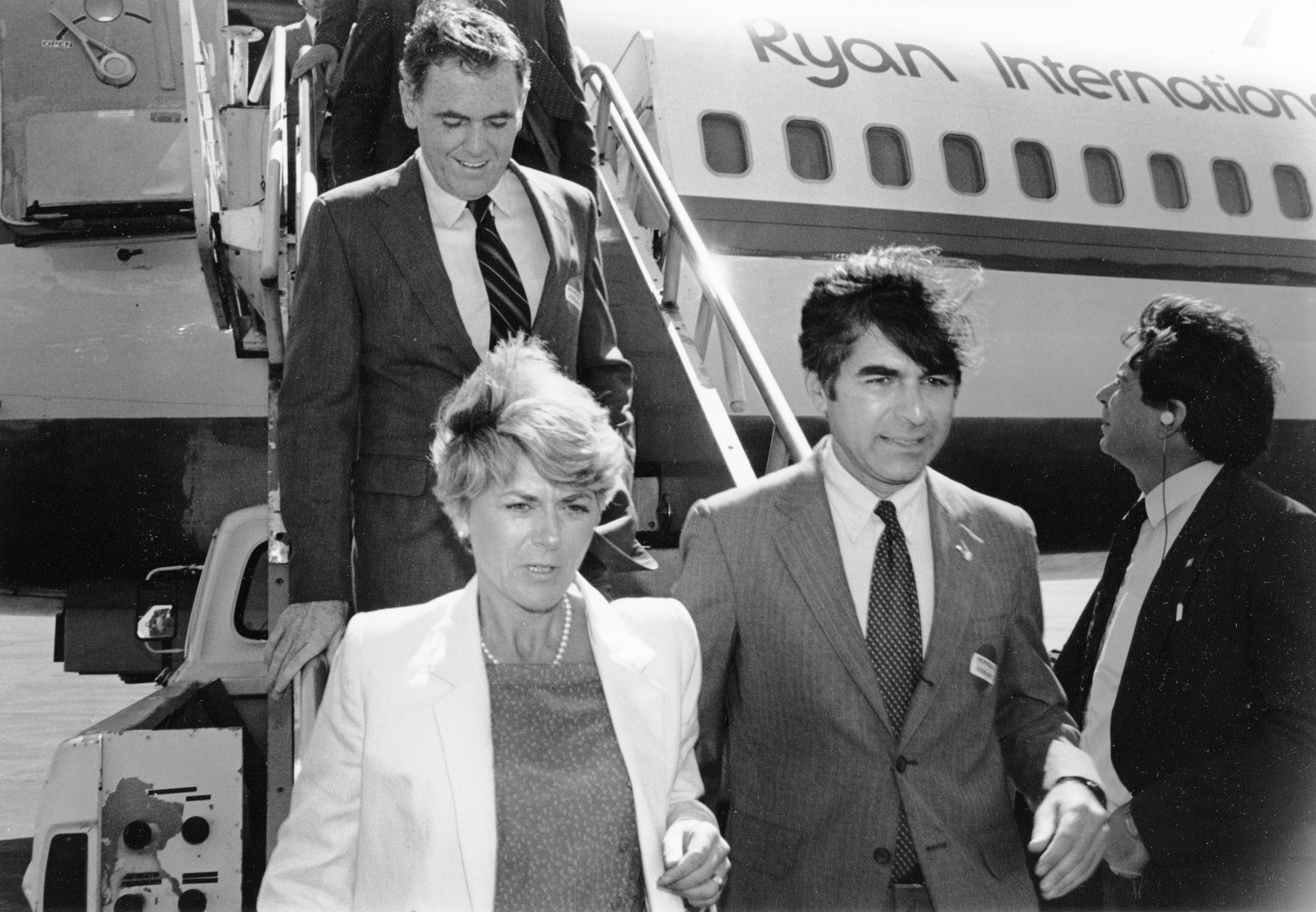
Ferraro with Boston Mayor Raymond Flynn and Massachusetts Governor Michael Dukakis at a campaign stop in Boston

Mondale wanted to establish a highly visible precedent with his vice presidential candidate. Mondale chose U.S. Rep. Geraldine A. Ferraro from New York as his running mate, making her the first woman nominated for that position by a major party. Another reason for the nominee to "go for broke" instead of balancing the ticket was Reagan's lead in the polls. Mondale hoped to appeal to women, who were the majority of voters by 1980. In a "much criticized parade of possible Veep candidates" to his home in Minnesota, Mondale considered San Francisco Mayor Dianne Feinstein and Kentucky Governor Martha Layne Collins, also female; Los Angeles Mayor Tom Bradley, an African American; and San Antonio Mayor Henry Cisneros, a Hispanic, as other finalists for the nomination. In addition to her sex, Mondale chose Ferraro because he hoped she would attract ethnic voters with her personal background. Unsuccessful nomination candidate Jesse Jackson derided Mondale's vice-presidential screening process as a "P.R. parade of personalities", but praised Mondale for his choice, having himself pledged to name a woman to the ticket in the event he was nominated.

Mondale had wanted to choose New York Governor Mario Cuomo as his running mate, but Cuomo declined and recommended Ferraro, his protégée. Mondale might have named Massachusetts Governor Michael Dukakis as his running mate had he wanted to make a "safe" choice", while others preferred Senator Lloyd Bentsen because he would appeal to more conservative Southern voters. Nomination rival Gary Hart stated before Ferraro's selection that he would accept an invitation to run with Mondale; Hart's supporters claimed he would do better than Mondale against President Reagan, an argument undercut by a June 1984 Gallup poll that showed both men nine points behind the president.

=== Other parties ===
==== National Unity Party nomination ====
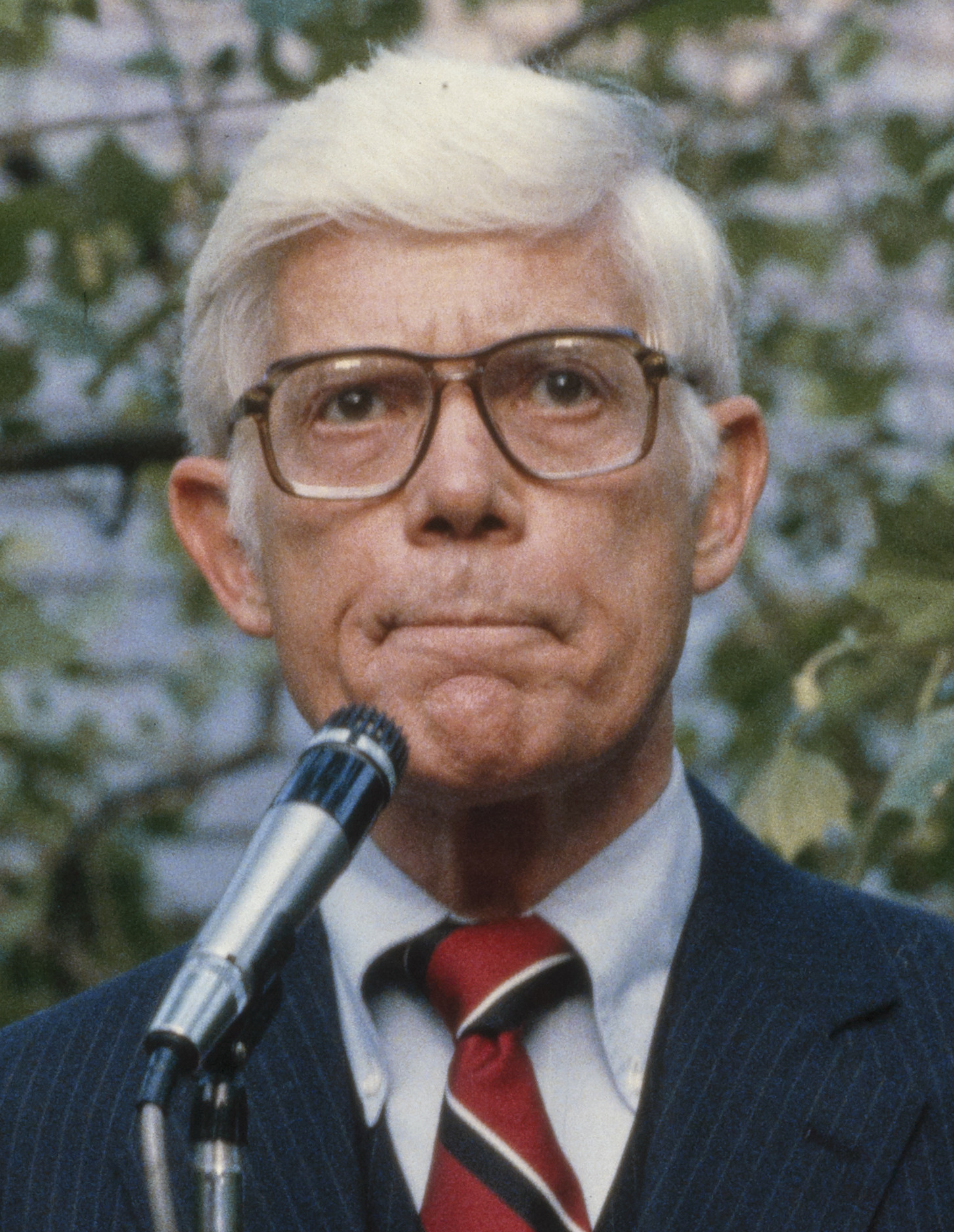
Former U.S. representative John B. Anderson declined to run on April 26, 1984, and endorsed Mondale on August 27.

The National Unity Party was an outgrowth of John B. Anderson's presidential campaign from 1980. Anderson hoped that the party would be able to challenge the "two old parties", which he viewed as being tied to various special interest groups and incapable of responsible fiscal reform. The intention was to organize the new party in California, Oregon, Washington, Illinois, the New England states, and others where his previous candidacy had proven to have experienced the most success. The party was also eligible for $5.8 million in Federal election funds, but its qualification depended on it being on the ballot in at least ten states; however, it remained unclear if National Unity or Anderson personally was eligible to obtain the funds.

At first, Anderson opposed running, hoping that another notable politico would take the party into the 1984 election, and feared that his own candidacy might result in the party being labeled a "personality cult". However, no candidate came forward, resulting in Anderson becoming the nominee in waiting. While Anderson had found similar levels of support from the Republicans and Democrats in the 1980 election, the grand majority of the former had since switched back, resulting in the new party being supported principally by those who normally would vote Democratic, which it was feared might make him a spoiler candidate. In light of this, in addition to difficulties in getting on the ballot in his targeted states (Utah and Kentucky were the only two, neither among those he intended to prominently campaign in), Anderson ultimately declined to run.

Anderson announced that he would not run on April 26, 1984. He later endorsed Mondale and a survey of National Unity members showed that they supported his action. Anderson had hoped that the party would continue to grow and field candidates in 1986, and later a presidential candidate in 1988.

==== Libertarian Party nomination ====
- David Bergland, Party Chairman from California
- Gene Burns, talk radio host from Florida (withdrew – August 26, 1983)
- Tonie Nathan, 1972 vice presidential nominee from Oregon (declined to contest)
- Earl Ravenal, foreign policy analyst, academic, and writer from Washington, D.C.
- Mary Ruwart, research scientist from Texas

Burns was the initial frontrunner for the nomination, but withdrew, citing concerns that the party would not be able to properly finance a campaign. The remaining candidates were Bergland; Ravenal, who had worked in the Department of Defense under Robert McNamara and Clark Clifford; and Ruwart. Bergland narrowly won the presidential nomination over Ravenal. His running mate was James A. Lewis. The ticket appeared on 39 state ballots.

==== Citizens Party nomination ====
Sonia Johnson ran in the 1984 presidential election, as the presidential candidate of the Citizens Party, Pennsylvania's Consumer Party and California's Peace and Freedom Party. Johnson received 72,161 votes (0.1%) finishing fifth. Her running mate for the Citizens Party was Richard Walton and for the Peace and Freedom Party Emma Wong Mar. One of her campaign managers, Mark Dunlea, later wrote a novel about a first female president, Madame President.

==== Communist Party nomination ====
The Communist Party USA ran Gus Hall for president and Angela Davis for vice president.

== General election ==
=== Polling aggregation ===
The following graph depicts the standing of each candidate in the poll aggregators from July 1983 to Election Day.

Ronald Reagan Walter Mondale

=== Polling ===
Poll source	Date(s) administered	Ronald Reagan (R)	Walter Mondale (D)	Other	Undecided
ABC-Washington Post	September 9–13, 1982	45%	38%	-	17%
Gallup	December 10–13, 1982	40%	52%	-	8%
Harris	January 2–5, 1983	44%	53%	-	3%
Gallup	February 25–28, 1983	41%	47%	3%	12%
Harris	Mar. 17-Apr. 10, 1983	48%	46%	-	6%
ABC-Washington Post	April 8–12, 1983	46%	45%	-	9%
Gallup	Apr. 29-May 2, 1983	42%	49%	-	9%
Los Angeles Times	May 8–12, 1983	48%	40%	-	12%
ABC-Washington Post	May 11–15, 1983	47%	42%	-	11%
Gallup	May 13–16, 1983	42%	47%	-	11%
Harris	June 1–11, 1983	50%	45%	-	5%
Gallup	June 10–13, 1983	41%	50%	3%	6%
Harris	July 14–18, 1983	49%	46%	-	5%
ABC-Washington Post	Jul. 28-Aug. 1, 1983	47%	48%	-	5%
Gallup	Jul. 29-Aug. 1, 1983	44%	42%	-	14%
Gallup	August 12–15, 1983	44%	43%	-	13%
Gallup	September 16–19, 1983	48%	44%	-	8%
ABC-Washington Post	September 22–26, 1983	46%	48%	-	6%
Gallup	October 7–10, 1983	44%	50%	-	6%
Harris	November 9–12, 1983	51%	45%	-	4%
Gallup	December 9–12, 1983	51%	44%	-	5%
ABC-Washington Post	December 9–13, 1983	48%	47%	-	5%
Gallup	January 13–16, 1984	48%	47%	-	5%
CBS/New York Times	January 14–21, 1984	46%	41%	-	13%
Gallup	February 10–13, 1984	53%	43%	-	10%
Gallup	February 10–13, 1984	52%	42%	-	10%
ABC-Washington Post	February 13–15, 1984	50%	45%	-	5%
Gallup	March 1–2, 1984	54%	42%	-	4%
Harris	March 1–3, 1984	55%	41%	-	4%
Gallup	March 2–6, 1984	50%	45%	-	5%
Harris	March 15–17, 1984	57%	37%	-	6%
Gallup	March 16–19, 1984	52%	44%	-	4%
Gallup	April 11–15, 1984	52%	44%	-	4%
Gallup	May 3–5, 1984	50%	46%	-	4%
Gallup	May 18–21, 1984	53%	43%	-	4%
Gallup	June 6–8, 1984	53%	44%	-	3%
Harris	June 7–11, 1984	56%	41%	-	3%
Gallup	June 22–25, 1984	56%	38%	-	6%
CBS/New York Times	June 23–28, 1984	50%	35%	-	15%
Gallup	Jun. 29-Jul. 2, 1984	51%	43%	-	6%
Harris	July 2–7, 1984	51%	45%	-	4%
ABC-Washington Post	July 5–8, 1984	51%	44%	-	5%
CBS/New York Times	July 12, 1984	53%	38%	-	9%
Gallup	July 13–16, 1984	52%	39%	-	8%
July 16: Democratic Convention Begins
July 19: Democratic Convention Ends
Gallup	July 19–20, 1984	46%	48%	-	6%
Harris	July 20–24, 1984	50%	48%	-	2%
Gallup	July 27–29, 1984	52%	42%	-	6%
Gallup	July 27–30, 1984	53%	41%	-	6%
ABC-Washington Post	Jul. 28-Aug. 1, 1983	47%	48%	-	5%
CBS/New York Times	August 5–9, 1984	49%	34%	-	17%
Harris	August 5–9, 1984	54%	42%	-	6%
Gallup	August 10–13, 1984	52%	41%	-	7%
August 20: Republican Convention Begins
August 23: Republican Convention Ends
Harris	August 24–25, 1984	55%	40%	-	5%
Harris	September 5–9, 1984	55%	42%	-	3%
Gallup	September 7–10, 1984	56%	37%	-	7%
ABC-Washington Post	September 6–11, 1984	56%	40%	-	4%
Gallup	September 21–24, 1984	58%	37%	-	5%
Harris	September 21–25, 1984	55%	42%	-	3%
Gallup	Sep. 28-Oct. 1, 1984	55%	39%	-	6%
CBS/New York Times	Sep. 30-Oct. 4, 1984	59%	33%	-	7%
ABC-Washington Post	October 8–9, 1984	56%	41%	-	3%
Harris	October 8–9, 1984	54%	42%	-	4%
Harris	October 13–15, 1984	53%	44%	-	3%
ABC-Washington Post	October 12–16, 1984	54%	42%	-	4%
Gallup	October 15–17, 1984	58%	38%	-	4%
Harris	October 22–23, 1984	56%	42%	-	2%
Harris	October 26–28, 1984	58%	41%	-	1%
Gallup	October 26–29, 1984	56%	39%	-	5%
Harris	October 26–29, 1984	58%	40%	-	1%
ABC/Washington Post	Oct. 29-Nov. 1, 1984	57%	39%	-	4%
Harris	Oct, 26-Nov. 1, 1984	57%	41%	-	2%
CBS/New York Times	Oct. 29-Nov. 1, 1984	58%	37%	-	5%
ABC-Washington Post	November 2–3, 1984	54%	40%	-	6%
Gallup	November 2–3, 1984	57%	39%	-	4%
Harris	November 2–3, 1984	55%	43%	-	2%
Roper	Oct. 27-Nov. 3, 1984	52.5%	42.5%	-	5%
Election Results	Nov. 6, 1984	58.77%	40.56%	0.67%	-

=== Campaign ===
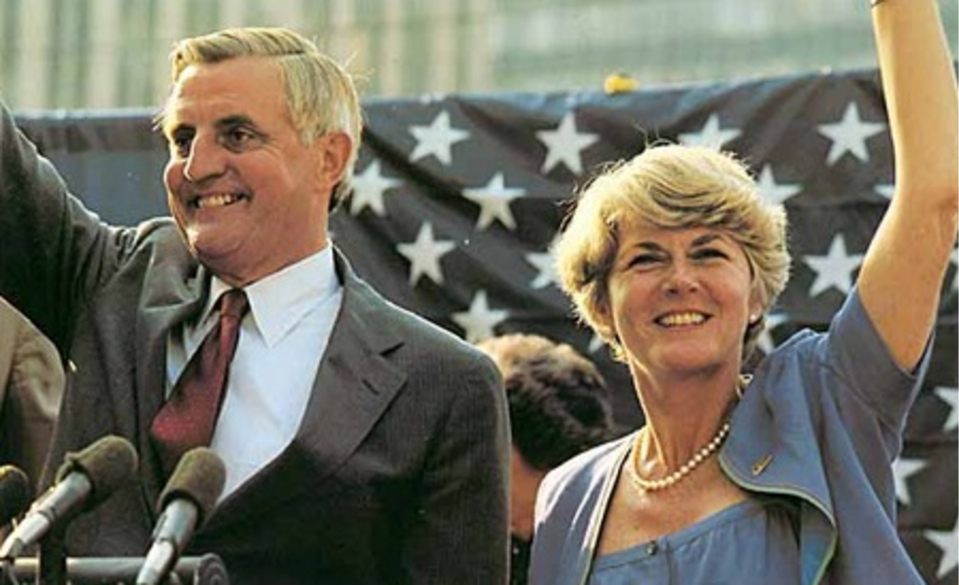
Mondale and Ferraro campaigning in Fort Lauderdale, Florida

Mondale unsuccessfully tried to replace Charles Manatt with Bert Lance as chair of the DNC. Mondale made Lance the chair of his presidential campaign. However, Lance had to be removed due to controversy over his tenure as director of the Office of Management and Budget.

Reagan's lead in polling declined after the Republican convention due to its strong right-wing stances. Reagan was also criticized for a joke about bombing the Soviet Union. However, polls showed that voters believed Mondale was "too cautious and vague" and was trying to appeal to too many special interest groups.

Roger Stone and other strategists working for Reagan viewed Ohio, where unemployment was 10%, as his most vulnerable state.

Reagan made appeals to Evangelical voters during the campaign. He declared January 22, 1984, to be National Sanctity of Human Life Day. The American Coalition for Traditional Values (ACTV), under the leadership of Tim LaHaye, was tasked with maintaining Evangelical support. The ACTV planned on registering 2.5 million voters. LaHaye sent a letter to 45,000 ministers in sixteen states, under the title of the Christian Voter Program, asking for them to support Reagan's campaign and register voters.

Mondale ran a liberal campaign, supporting a nuclear freeze and the Equal Rights Amendment (ERA). He spoke against what he considered to be unfairness in Reagan's economic policies and the need to reduce federal budget deficits.

While Ferraro's choice was popular among Democratic activists, polls immediately after the announcement showed that only 22% of women were pleased about her selection, versus 18% who believed that it was a bad idea. 60% of all voters thought that pressure from women's groups had led to Mondale's decision, versus 22% who believed that he had chosen the best available candidate. Some members of the hierarchy of the Roman Catholic Church criticized the Catholic Ferraro for being pro-choice on abortion. Already fighting an uphill battle with voters, Ferraro also faced a slew of allegations, mid-campaign, directed toward her husband, John Zaccaro. These allegations included Zaccaro's possible past involvement in organized crime, pornography distribution, and campaign contribution violations. Ferraro responded to these allegations against her husband by releasing her family tax returns to the media on August 21, 1984. However, the damage to the campaign was already done.

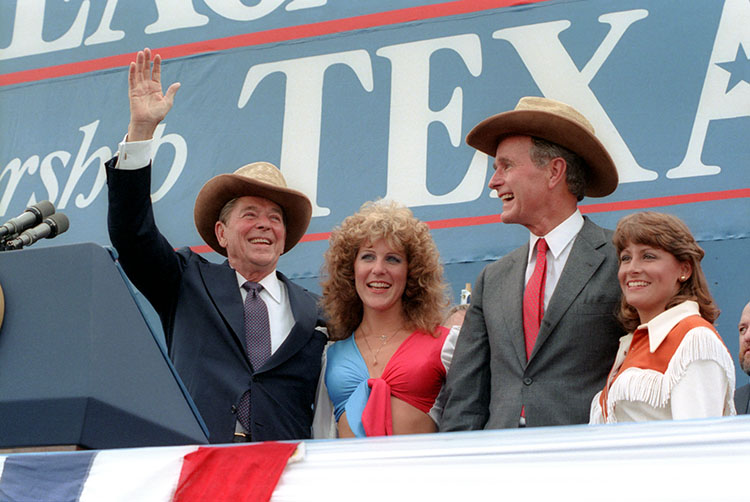
Reagan and Bush campaigning in Austin, Texas

At a campaign stop in Hammonton, New Jersey, Reagan said, "America's future rests in a thousand dreams inside your hearts. It rests in the message of hope in songs of a man so many young Americans admire, New Jersey's Bruce Springsteen." The Reagan campaign briefly used "Born in the U.S.A.", a song criticizing the treatment of Vietnam War veterans (which they mistakenly thought was devoid of anti-war content and a very jingoistic patriotic rock song), as a campaign song, without permission, until Springsteen, a lifelong Democrat, requested that they stop. Two of the more memorable Reagan campaign ads were commonly known as "Morning in America" and, after the difficult first debate for the president, "Bear in the woods".

Clip from the second debate in which Reagan responds to a question about his age

Reagan was the oldest president to have served to that time (at 73) and there were questions about his capacity to endure the grueling demands of the presidency, particularly after Reagan had a poor showing in the first 1984 United States presidential debates with Mondale on October 7. He referred to having started going to church "here in Washington", although the debate was in Louisville, Kentucky, referred to military uniforms as "wardrobe", and admitted to being "confused", among other mistakes. In the next debate on October 21, however, in response to a question from journalist Henry Trewhitt about his age, Reagan joked, "I will not make age an issue of this campaign. I am not going to exploit, for political purposes, my opponent's youth and inexperience." Mondale himself laughed at the joke, and later admitted that Reagan had effectively neutralized the age issue:

If TV can tell the truth, as you say it can, you'll see that I was smiling. But I think if you come in close, you'll see some tears coming down because I knew he had gotten me there. That was really the end of my campaign that night, I think. [I told my wife] the campaign was over, and it was.

=== Presidential debates ===
There were two presidential debates and one vice presidential debate during the 1984 general election.

No.	Date	Host	Location	Panelists	Moderator	Participants	Viewership (millions)
P1	Sunday, October 7, 1984	The Kentucky Center	Louisville, Kentucky	James Wieghart; Diane Sawyer; Fred Barnes	Barbara Walters	President Ronald Reagan; Vice President Walter Mondale	65.1
VP	Thursday, October 11, 1984	Philadelphia Civic Center	Philadelphia	John Bashek; Jack White; Robert Boyd	Sander Vanocur	Vice President George H. W. Bush; Congresswoman Geraldine Ferraro	56.7
P2	Sunday, October 21, 1984	Municipal Auditorium (Kansas City, Missouri)	Kansas City, Missouri	Georgie Anne Geyer; Marvin Kalb; Morton Kondracke	Edwin Newman	President Ronald Reagan; Vice President Walter Mondale	67.3

== Results ==
This was the first time since 1960 that the voter turnout percentage rose relative to its predecessor. Reagan was re-elected in the November 6 election in an electoral and popular vote landslide, winning 49 states by the time the ballots were finished counting on election night at 11:34 PM in Iowa. He won a record 525 electoral votes total (of 538 possible), and received 58.8% of the popular vote; despite Ferraro's selection, 55% of women who voted did so for Reagan, and his 54 to 61% of the Catholic vote was the highest for a Republican candidate in history. Mondale's 13 electoral college votes marked the lowest total of any major presidential candidate since Alf Landon's 1936 loss to Franklin D. Roosevelt, and the fewest of any Democrat since Stephen A. Douglas claimed 12 in the 1860 election, as well as the worst for a Democrat in a two-way race. However, Democrats Alton B. Parker, James M. Cox, John W. Davis, and George McGovern did worse in the popular vote. This was the second-largest share of the Electoral College any president won since 1820, when James Monroe won a near unanimous electoral victory, and the most raw electoral votes received by a candidate. This is the last time any candidate won the popular vote by double digits.

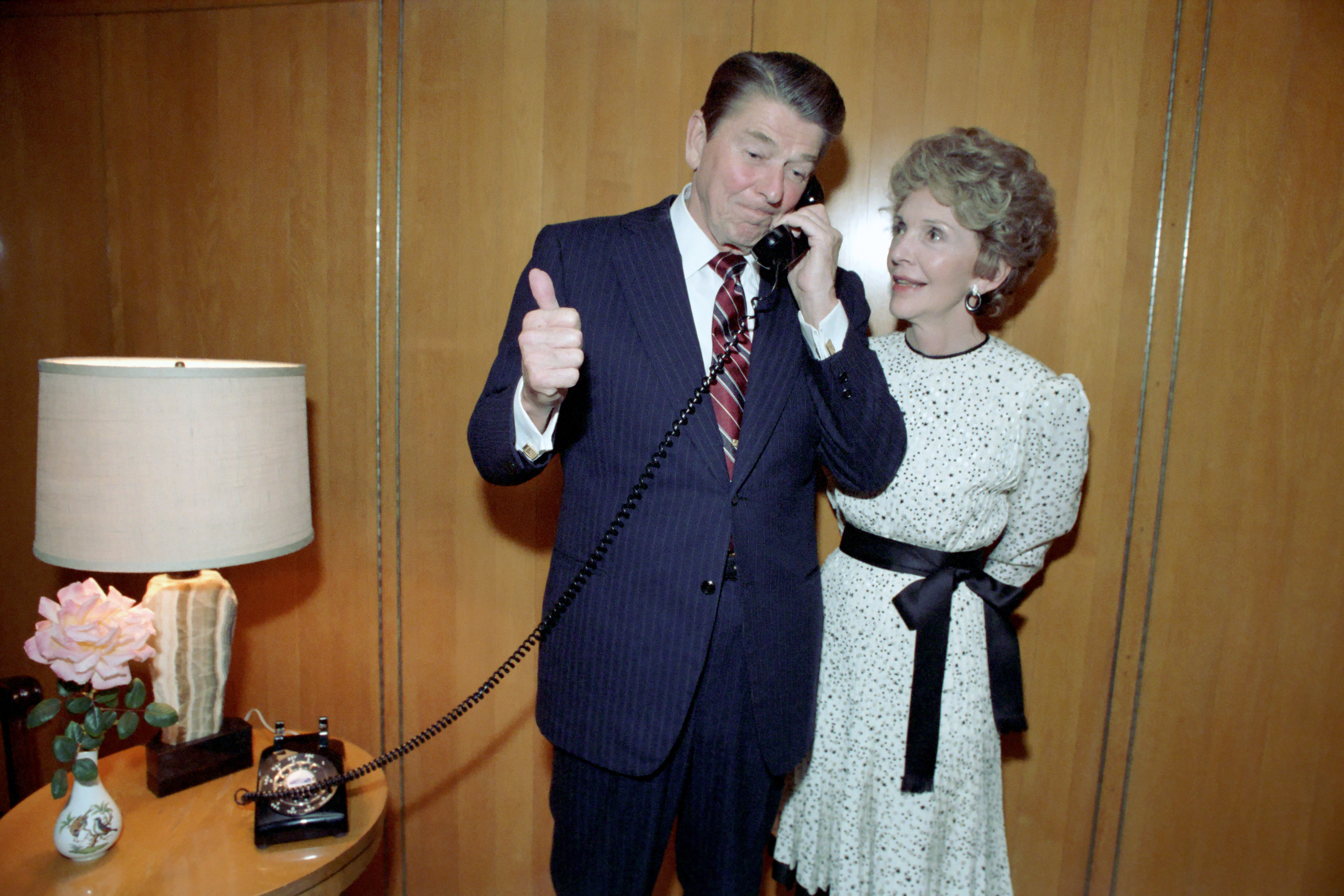
Reagan receiving a concession call from Mondale

When Reagan was asked in December 1984 what he wanted for Christmas he joked, "Well, Minnesota would have been nice". Reagan became the first Republican to ever win two terms in the White House without carrying Minnesota at least once, a feat later duplicated by George W. Bush and Donald Trump.

The election was the most recent in which the Republican candidate won every state in the Northeastern, Southern, and Pacific regions of the United States, and won at least one county in every state. The 525 electoral votes received by Reagan – the most received by a nominee in one election – added to the 489 electoral votes he achieved in 1980, and the 1 electoral vote he received in 1976, gave him 1,015 electoral votes, and the third highest number of electoral votes received by any candidate who was elected to the office of president behind Richard Nixon's 1,040 and Franklin D. Roosevelt's 1,876 total electoral votes.

=== Statistical analysis ===
Reagan's landslide victory resulted in him winning 97.6% of electoral votes, behind only Franklin D. Roosevelt's 98.5% in 1936. However, Reagan's popular vote share was below those of elected presidents Warren G. Harding in 1920, Franklin D. Roosevelt in 1936, Lyndon B. Johnson in 1964, and Richard Nixon in 1972. His margin of victory was also lower than those for elected presidents Theodore Roosevelt in 1904, Harding in 1920, Calvin Coolidge in 1924, Franklin D. Roosevelt in 1936, Johnson in 1964, or Nixon in 1972. Reagan's percentage in each state rose from 1980, with his best performances occurring in the South and states with high third-party votes. Mondale improved upon Carter's 1980 results in 28 states, but performed worse in 22 states, 15 of which were in the South. Mondale's share of the popular vote was 0.4 percentage points lower than Carter's.

The Republicans gained seats in the concurrent U.S. House of Representatives elections and lost two seats in the concurrent U.S. Senate elections, but overall control of both chambers remained the same. Reagan underperformed Republican senatorial candidates in Alaska, Colorado, Kansas, Maine, Minnesota, New Mexico, Oregon, South Carolina, South Dakota, Virginia, and Wyoming. Jesse Helms of North Carolina and Mitch McConnell of Kentucky were the only Republican senatorial candidates who could have benefited from the coattails effect.

Psephologists attributed a factor of the Republican victory to "Reagan Democrats", millions of Democrats who voted for Reagan, as in 1980. They characterized such Reagan Democrats as southern whites and northern blue-collar workers who voted for Reagan because they credited him with the economic recovery, saw him as strong on national security issues, and perceived the Democrats as supporting the poor and minorities at the expense of the middle class. The Democratic National Committee commissioned a study after the election that came to these conclusions, but destroyed all copies of the final report, afraid that it would offend the party's key voters.

The percentage of Democrats who voted for Reagan ranged from 16 to 26% while Republicans voting for Mondale ranged from 3 to 7% according to exit polls by the Los Angeles Times, NBC, ABC/The Washington Post, and CBS News/The New York Times. One-third of people who supported Hart during the Democratic primary voted for Reagan. Polling by CBS News and The New York Times reported that 66% of Anderson voters supported Mondale while 27% supported Reagan and 61% of Carter voters supported Mondale while 25% supported Reagan. Twenty-two percent of those who did not vote in 1980 supported Reagan while 18% supported Mondale.

Reagan also benefited from a near-total collapse in the third-party vote, which dropped to just 0.67% of the popular vote, its lowest level since 1964; Bergland's campaign alone accounted for over a third of this number, while none of the other third-party candidates exceeded 0.1% of the popular vote. Reagan, who won 63% of white evangelical voters in 1980, received 80% of their votes against Mondale.

As of 2024, this marked the last election where the Republican nominee won Hawaii, Massachusetts, New York, Oregon, Rhode Island, and Washington. It was also the last election where the Republican nominee won Wisconsin until 2016, Iowa until 2004, West Virginia until 2000, the last election in which the winning candidate won by a double-digit margin in the percentage of the popular vote, and the last election where the winning candidate won by an eight-digit margin in total popular votes (10 million or more). This is the last time that the tipping point state (in this case, Michigan) was decided by a double-digit margin.

At age 73, Reagan was the oldest president ever to win a presidential election. Thirty-six years later, in 2020, Joe Biden surpassed this record at age 77, as did Donald Trump in 2024 at age 78. However, Reagan remains the oldest incumbent president to win a presidential election. (Note: In 2020, Trump lost his re-election to a second consecutive term. Had Trump been re-elected in 2020 at age 74, he would have surpassed Reagan's record as the oldest incumbent president to win a presidential election.)

=== Electoral results ===
Electoral results
Presidential candidate	Party	Home state	Popular vote		Electoral vote	Running mate		
Presidential candidate	Party	Home state	Count	Percentage	Electoral vote	Vice-presidential candidate	Home state	Electoral vote
Ronald Reagan (incumbent)	Republican	California	54,455,472	58.77%	525	George H. W. Bush (incumbent)	Texas	525
Walter Mondale	Democratic	Minnesota	37,577,352	40.56%	13	Geraldine Ferraro	New York	13
David Bergland	Libertarian	California	228,111	0.25%	0	Jim Lewis	Connecticut	0
Lyndon LaRouche	Independent	Virginia	78,809	0.09%	0	Billy Davis	Mississippi	0
Sonia Johnson	Citizens	Idaho	72,161	0.08%	0	Richard Walton	Rhode Island	0
Bob Richards	Populist	Texas	66,324	0.07%	0	Maureen Salaman	California	0
Dennis L. Serrette	New Alliance	New Jersey	46,853	0.05%	0	Nancy Ross	New York	0
Gus Hall	Communist	New York	36,386	0.04%	0	Angela Davis	California	0
Melvin T. Mason	Socialist Workers	California	24,699	0.03%	0	Matilde Zimmermann	New York	0
Larry Holmes	Workers World	New York	17,985	0.02%	0	Gloria La Riva	California	0
Other			49,181	0.05%	—	Other		—
Total			92,653,233	100%	538			538
Needed to win					270			270

Source for the popular vote:
Source for the electoral vote:

Popular vote
Reagan	58.77%
Mondale	40.56%
Bergland	0.25%
Others	0.42%

Electoral vote
Reagan	97.58%
Mondale	2.42%

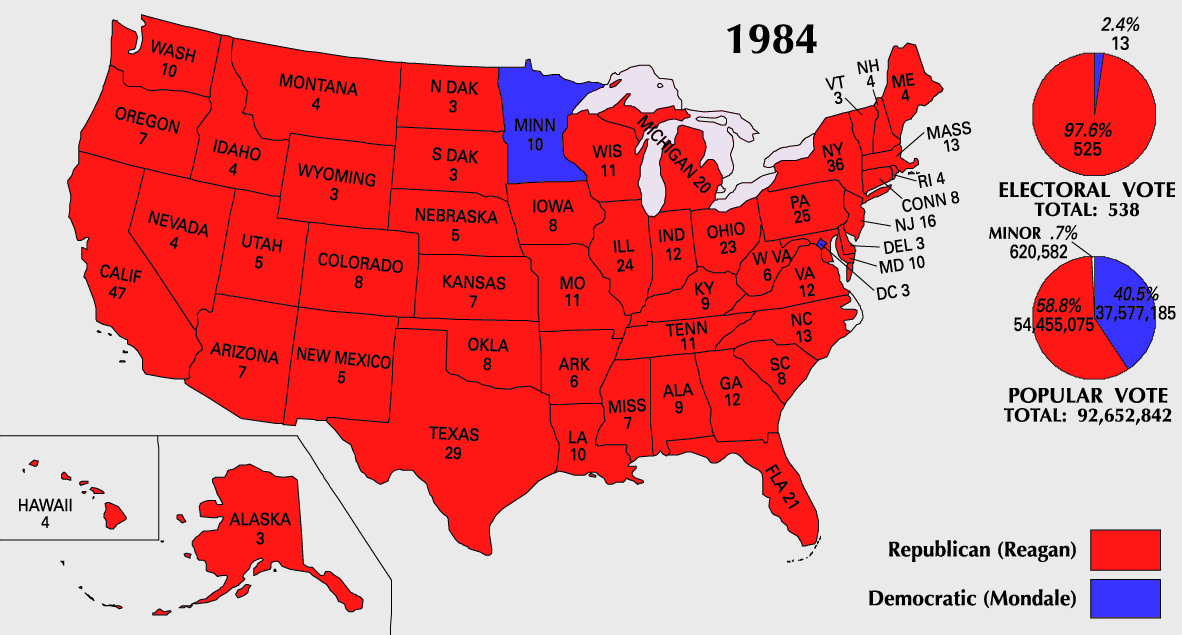

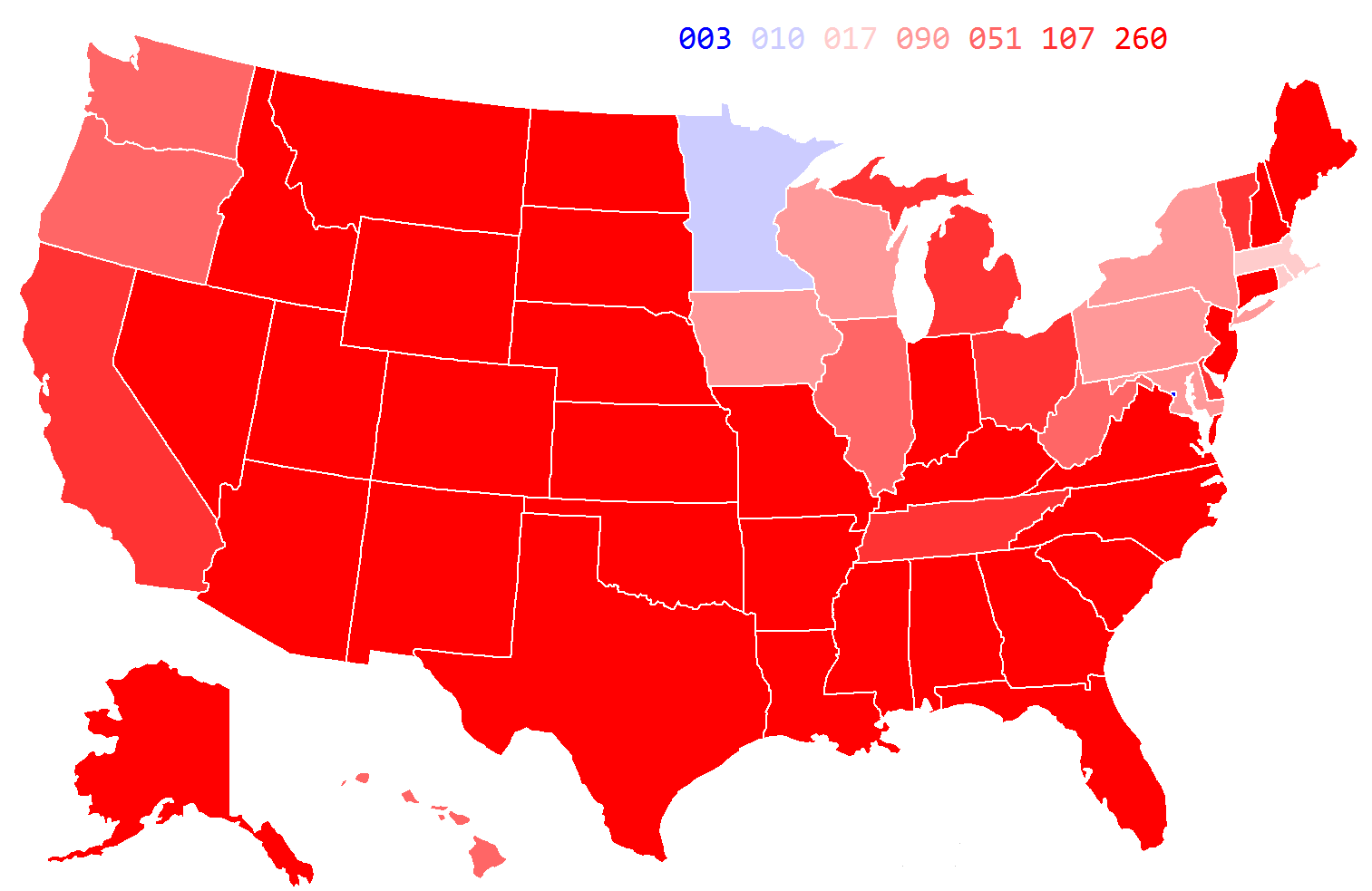
Results by margin, shaded according to winning candidate's percentage of the vote

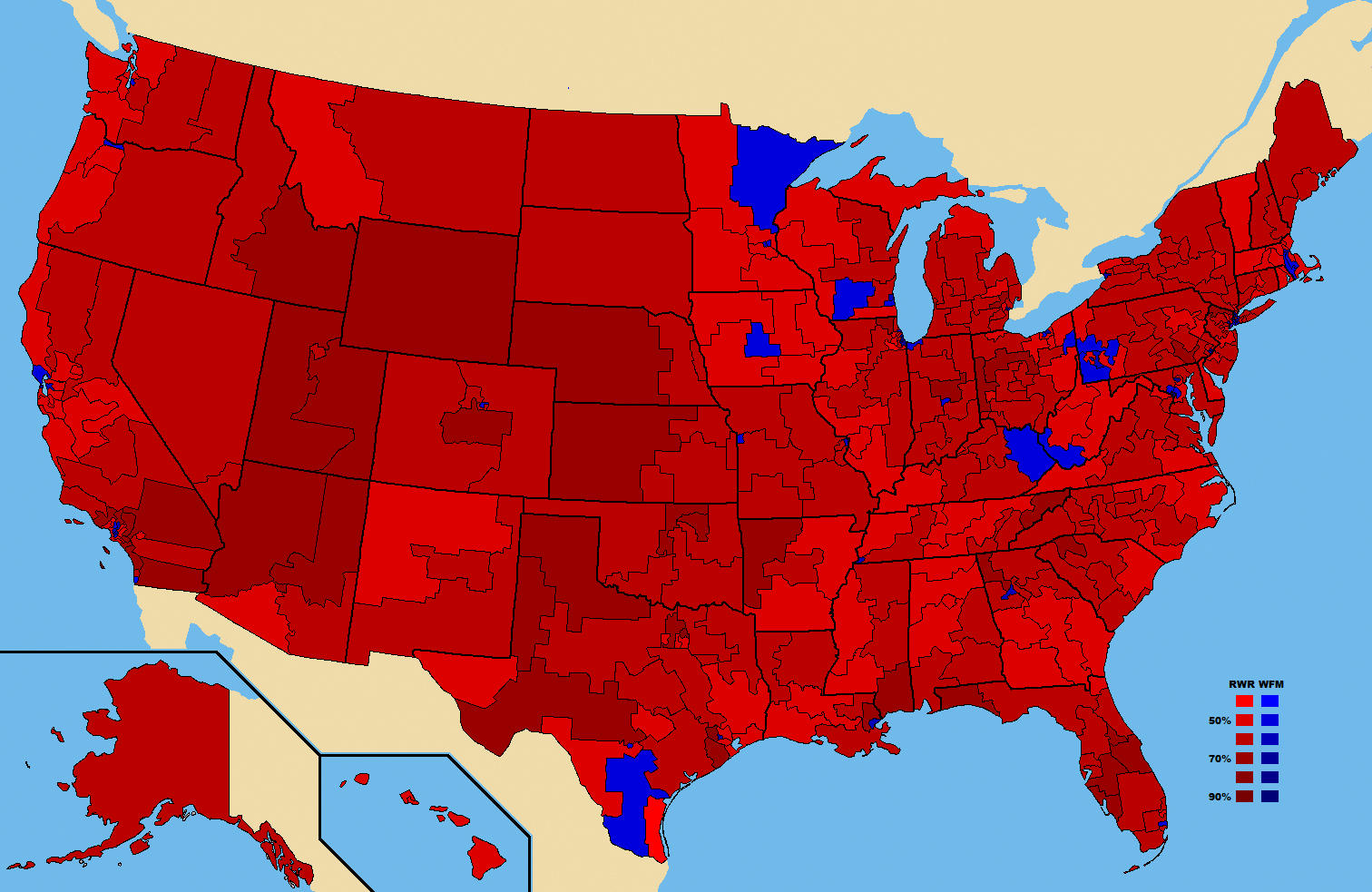
Results by congressional district, shaded according to winning candidate's percentage of the vote

Results by county, shaded according to winning candidate's percentage of the vote

=== Results by state ===
Legend
States/districts won by Reagan/Bush
States/districts won by Mondale/Ferraro
†	At-large results (Maine used the Congressional District Method)

		Ronald Reagan Republican			Walter Mondale Democratic			David Bergland Libertarian			Margin		Margin Swing	State total	
State	electoral votes	#	%	electoral votes	#	%	electoral votes	#	%	electoral votes	#	%	%	#	
Alabama	9	872,849	60.54	9	551,899	38.28	–	9,504	0.66	–	320,950	22.26	20.96	1,441,713	AL
Alaska	3	138,377	66.65	3	62,007	29.87	–	6,378	3.07	–	76,370	36.79	8.85	207,605	AK
Arizona	7	681,416	66.42	7	333,854	32.54	–	10,585	1.03	–	347,562	33.88	1.52	1,025,897	AZ
Arkansas	6	534,774	60.47	6	338,646	38.29	–	2,221	0.25	–	196,128	22.18	21.57	884,406	AR
California	47	5,467,009	57.51	47	3,922,519	41.27	–	49,951	0.53	–	1,544,490	16.25	−0.53	9,505,423	CA
Colorado	8	821,818	63.44	8	454,974	35.12	–	11,257	0.87	–	366,844	28.32	4.32	1,295,381	CO
Connecticut	8	890,877	60.73	8	569,597	38.83	–	–	–	–	321,280	21.90	12.27	1,466,900	CT
Delaware	3	152,190	59.78	3	101,656	39.93	–	268	0.11	–	50,534	19.85	17.52	254,572	DE
D.C.	3	29,009	13.73	–	180,408	85.38	3	279	0.13	–	−151,399	−71.66	−10.17	211,288	DC
Florida	21	2,730,350	65.32	21	1,448,816	34.66	–	754	0.02	–	1,281,534	30.66	13.64	4,180,051	FL
Georgia	12	1,068,722	60.17	12	706,628	39.79	–	151	0.01	–	362,094	20.39	35.20	1,776,093	GA
Hawaii	4	185,050	55.10	4	147,154	43.82	–	2,167	0.65	–	37,896	11.28	13.18	335,846	HI
Idaho	4	297,523	72.36	4	108,510	26.39	–	2,823	0.69	–	189,013	45.97	4.70	411,144	ID
Illinois	24	2,707,103	56.17	24	2,086,499	43.30	–	10,086	0.21	–	620,604	12.88	4.95	4,819,088	IL
Indiana	12	1,377,230	61.67	12	841,481	37.68	–	6,741	0.30	–	535,749	23.99	5.64	2,233,069	IN
Iowa	8	703,088	53.27	8	605,620	45.89	–	1,844	0.14	–	97,468	7.39	−5.31	1,319,805	IA
Kansas	7	677,296	66.27	7	333,149	32.60	–	3,329	0.33	–	344,147	33.67	9.11	1,021,991	KS
Kentucky	9	822,782	60.04	9	539,589	39.37	–	–	–	–	283,193	20.66	19.20	1,370,461	KY
Louisiana	10	1,037,299	60.77	10	651,586	38.18	–	1,876	0.11	–	385,713	22.60	17.15	1,706,822	LA
Maine †	2	336,500	60.83	2	214,515	38.78	–	–	–	–	121,985	22.05	18.69	553,144	ME
Maine-1	1	175,472	59.90	1	117,450	40.10	–	–	–	–	58,022	19.81	16.66	292,922	ME1
Maine-2	1	161,028	62.39	1	97,065	37.61	–	–	–	–	63,963	24.78	21.05	258,093	ME2
Maryland	10	879,918	52.51	10	787,935	47.02	–	5,721	0.34	–	91,983	5.49	8.45	1,675,873	MD
Massachusetts	13	1,310,936	51.22	13	1,239,606	48.43	–	–	–	–	71,330	2.79	2.64	2,559,453	MA
Michigan	20	2,251,571	59.23	20	1,529,638	40.24	–	10,055	0.26	–	721,933	18.99	12.50	3,801,658	MI
Minnesota	10	1,032,603	49.54	–	1,036,364	49.72	10	2,996	0.14	–	−3,761	−0.18	3.76	2,084,449	MN
Mississippi	7	581,477	61.85	7	352,192	37.46	–	2,336	0.25	–	229,285	24.39	23.07	940,192	MS
Missouri	11	1,274,188	60.02	11	848,583	39.98	–	–	–	–	425,605	20.05	13.24	2,122,771	MO
Montana	4	232,450	60.47	4	146,742	38.18	–	5,185	1.35	–	85,708	22.30	−2.09	384,377	MT
Nebraska	5	460,054	70.55	5	187,866	28.81	–	2,079	0.32	–	272,188	41.74	2.25	652,090	NE
Nevada	4	188,770	65.85	4	91,655	31.97	–	2,292	0.80	–	97,115	33.88	−2.26	286,667	NV
New Hampshire	4	267,051	68.66	4	120,395	30.95	–	735	0.19	–	146,656	37.71	8.32	388,954	NH
New Jersey	16	1,933,630	60.09	16	1,261,323	39.20	–	6,416	0.20	–	672,307	20.89	7.47	3,217,862	NJ
New Mexico	5	307,101	59.70	5	201,769	39.23	–	4,459	0.87	–	105,332	20.48	2.30	514,370	NM
New York	36	3,664,763	53.84	36	3,119,609	45.83	–	11,949	0.18	–	545,154	8.01	5.34	6,806,810	NY
North Carolina	13	1,346,481	61.90	13	824,287	37.89	–	3,794	0.17	–	522,194	24.00	21.88	2,175,361	NC
North Dakota	3	200,336	64.84	3	104,429	33.80	–	703	0.23	–	95,907	31.04	−6.93	308,971	ND
Ohio	23	2,678,560	58.90	23	1,825,440	40.14	–	5,886	0.13	–	853,120	18.76	8.16	4,547,619	OH
Oklahoma	8	861,530	68.61	8	385,080	30.67	–	9,066	0.72	–	476,450	37.94	12.41	1,255,676	OK
Oregon	7	685,700	55.91	7	536,479	43.74	–	–	–	–	149,221	12.17	2.51	1,226,527	OR
Pennsylvania	25	2,584,323	53.34	25	2,228,131	45.99	–	6,982	0.14	–	356,192	7.35	0.24	4,844,903	PA
Rhode Island	4	212,080	51.66	4	197,106	48.02	–	277	0.07	–	14,974	3.65	14.12	410,492	RI
South Carolina	8	615,539	63.55	8	344,470	35.57	–	4,360	0.45	–	271,069	27.99	26.46	968,540	SC
South Dakota	3	200,267	63.00	3	116,113	36.53	–	–	–	–	84,154	26.47	−2.36	317,867	SD
Tennessee	11	990,212	57.84	11	711,714	41.57	–	3,072	0.18	–	278,498	16.27	15.98	1,711,993	TN
Texas	29	3,433,428	63.61	29	1,949,276	36.11	–	–	–	–	1,484,152	27.50	13.64	5,397,571	TX
Utah	5	469,105	74.50	5	155,369	24.68	–	2,447	0.39	–	313,736	49.83	−2.37	629,656	UT
Vermont	3	135,865	57.92	3	95,730	40.81	–	1,002	0.43	–	40,135	17.11	11.15	234,561	VT
Virginia	12	1,337,078	62.29	12	796,250	37.09	–	–	–	–	540,828	25.19	12.47	2,146,635	VA
Washington	10	1,051,670	55.82	10	807,352	42.86	–	8,844	0.47	–	244,318	12.97	0.63	1,883,910	WA
West Virginia	6	405,483	55.11	6	328,125	44.60	–	–	–	–	77,358	10.51	15.02	735,742	WV
Wisconsin	11	1,198,800	54.19	11	995,847	45.02	–	4,884	0.22	–	202,953	9.18	4.46	2,212,016	WI
Wyoming	3	133,241	70.51	3	53,370	28.24	–	2,357	1.25	–	79,871	42.27	7.60	188,968	WY
TOTALS:	538	54,455,472	58.77	525	37,577,352	40.56	13	228,111	0.25	–	16,878,120	18.22	8.48	92,653,233	US

Maine allowed its electoral votes to be split between candidates. Two electoral votes were awarded to the winner of the statewide race and one electoral vote to the winner of each congressional district. Reagan won all four votes.

==== States that flipped from Democratic to Republican ====
- Georgia
- Hawaii
- Maryland
- Rhode Island
- West Virginia

==== Close states ====
Margin of victory less than 1% (10 electoral votes):

1. Minnesota, 0.18% (3,761 votes)

Margin of victory more than 1%, but less than 5% (17 electoral votes):

1. Massachusetts, 2.79% (71,330 votes)
2. Rhode Island, 3.65% (14,974 votes)

Margin of victory more than 5%, but less than 10% (90 electoral votes):

1. Maryland, 5.49% (91,983 votes)
2. Pennsylvania, 7.35% (356,192 votes)
3. Iowa, 7.38% (97,468 votes)
4. New York, 8.01% (545,154 votes)
5. Wisconsin, 9.17% (202,953 votes)

Tipping point:

1. Michigan, 18.99% (721,933 votes)

=== Counties ===
Counties with highest percent of vote (Republican)

1. Madison County, Idaho 92.88%
2. Hansford County, Texas 89.38%
3. Ochiltree County, Texas 89.15%
4. Grant County, Nebraska 88.45%
5. Blaine County, Nebraska 88.32%

Counties with highest percent of vote (Democratic)

1. Washington, D.C. 85.38%
2. Macon County, Alabama 82.71%
3. Shannon County, South Dakota 81.41%
4. Jefferson County, Mississippi 77.94%
5. Hancock County, Georgia 76.61%

== Voter demographics ==
The 1984 presidential vote by demographic subgroup
Demographic subgroup	Mondale	Reagan	% of total vote
Total vote	41	59	100
Ideology
Liberals	71	29	16
Moderates	46	54	42
Conservatives	18	82	33
Party
Democrats	74	26	38
Republicans	7	93	35
Independents	36	62	26
Gender
Men	38	62	47
Women	42	58	53
Race
White	34	66	86
Black	91	9	10
Hispanic	66	34	3
Age
18–24 years old	39	61	11
25–29 years old	43	57	12
30–49 years old	42	58	34
50–64 years old	39	61	23
65 and older	36	64	19
Family income
Under $12,500	54	46	15
$12,500–25,000	42	58	27
$25,000–35,000	40	60	20
$35,000–50,000	32	68	17
Over $50,000	31	69	12
Region
East	46	53	26
Midwest	39	61	30
South	37	63	27
West	38	62	17
Union households
Union	54	46	26

Source: CBS News and The New York Times exit poll from the Roper Center for Public Opinion Research (9,174 surveyed)

The 1984 presidential vote by important political issues
Important	Mondale	Reagan	% of checked
Economy
Yes	25	75	40
No	53	47	60
Arms control
Yes	65	35	29
No	33	67	71
Defense
Yes	8	92	25
No	53	47	75
Federal deficit reduction
Yes	47	53	23
No	40	60	77
Fairness towards poor
Yes	82	18	21
No	31	69	79
Abortion
Yes	27	73	7
No	43	57	93
Policy towards Central America
Yes	61	39	4
No	41	59	96

== Notable expressions and phrases ==
- Where's the beef?: A slogan used by Wendy's to suggest that their competitors have smaller portions of meat in their sandwiches, but used in the Democratic primaries by Mondale to criticize Gary Hart's positions as lacking substance.
- Morning in America: Slogan used by the Reagan campaign.

== See also ==
- 1984 United States Senate elections
- 1984 United States House of Representatives elections
- 1984 United States gubernatorial elections
- History of the United States (1980–1991)
- Second inauguration of Ronald Reagan

== Works cited ==
=== Books ===
- Pomper, Marlene, ed. (1985). The Election of 1984. Chatham House. ISBN 093454042X.
- Ranney, Austin, ed. (1985). The American Elections of 1984. Duke University Press. ISBN 0-8223-0230-6.

=== Journals ===
- Frankovic, Kathleen (1985). "The 1984 Election: The Irrelevance of the Campaign". PS. 18 (1). American Political Science Association: 39–47. doi:10.2307/418804. JSTOR 418804.
- Granberg, Donald (1987). "The Abortion Issue in the 1984 Elections". Family Planning Perspectives. 19 (2). Guttmacher Institute: 59–62. doi:10.2307/2135050. JSTOR 2135050. PMID 3595819.
- Pierard, Richard (1985). "Religion and the 1984 Election Campaign". Review of Religious Research. 27 (2). Religious Research Association: 98–114. doi:10.2307/3511665. JSTOR 3511665.
- Rosenstone, Steven (1985). "Explaining the 1984 Presidential Election". The Brookings Review. 3 (2). Brookings Institution: 25–32. JSTOR 20079866.
