= 1984 United States presidential debates =

Part of the 1984 U.S. presidential election

- October 7, 1984; October 21, 1984

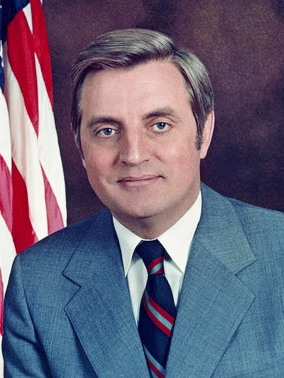
Nominee	Ronald Reagan	Walter Mondale
Party	Republican	Democratic
Home state	California	Minnesota
- 1984 United States vice presidential debate
- October 11, 1984

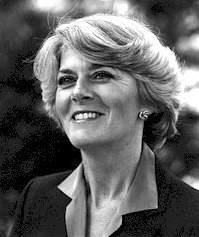
Nominee	George H. W. Bush	Geraldine Ferraro
Party	Republican	Democratic
Home state	Texas	New York

The 1984 United States presidential debates were a series of debates held during the 1984 presidential election.

The League of Women Voters organized three debates among the major party candidates, sponsored two presidential debates and one vice presidential debate. Two presidential debates were held between Republican nominee Ronald Reagan and Democratic nominee Walter Mondale. One vice presidential debate was held between their respective vice presidential running mates, George H. W. Bush and Geraldine Ferraro.

== Debate schedule ==
1984 United States presidential election debates
No.	Date & Time	Host	Location	Moderator	Participants	
Key: P Participant. N Non-invitee.					Republican	Democratic
Key: P Participant. N Non-invitee.					President Ronald Reagan of California	Vice President Walter Mondale of Minnesota
1	Sunday, October 7, 1984, 9:00 – 10:30 p.m. EDT	The Kentucky Center for the Performing Arts	Louisville, Kentucky	Barbara Walters of ABC	P	P
2	Sunday, October 21, 1984, 8:00 – 9:30 p.m. EDT	Music Hall, Municipal Auditorium	Kansas City, Missouri	Edwin Newman of NBC (formerly)	P	P
1984 United States vice presidential debate
No.	Date & Time	Host	Location	Moderator	Participants	
Key: P Participant. N Non-invitee.					Republican	Democratic
Key: P Participant. N Non-invitee.					Vice President George H. W. Bush of Texas	Congresswoman Geraldine Ferraro of New York
VP	Thursday, October 11, 1984, 9:00 – 10:30 p.m. EDT	Pennsylvania Hall Civic Center	Philadelphia, Pennsylvania	Sander Vanocur of ABC	P	P

== October 7: First presidential debate (The Kentucky Center for the Performing Arts) ==
First presidential debate
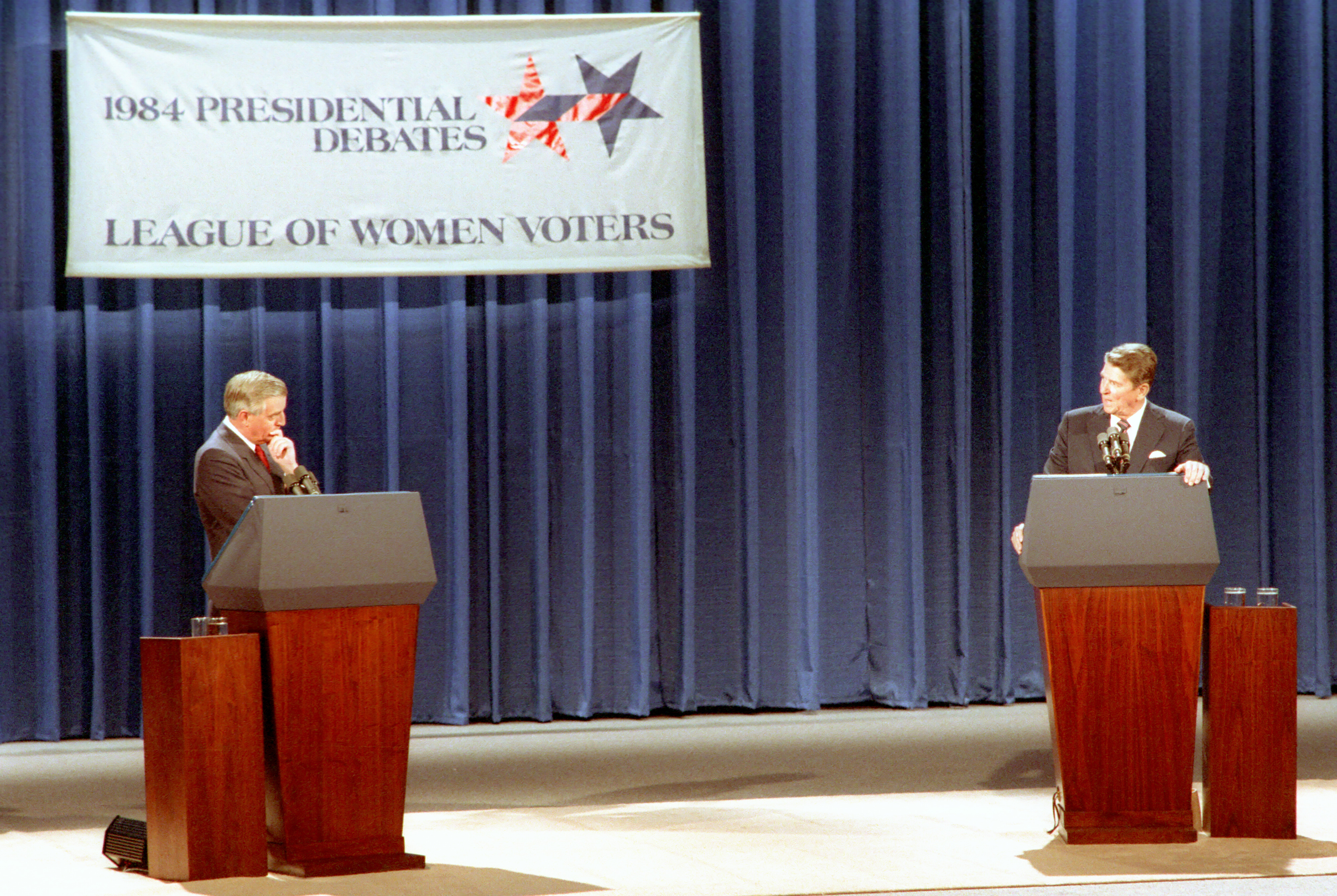
- Date(s): October 7, 1984
- Duration: 90 minutes
- Venue: The Kentucky Center for the Performing Arts
- Location: Louisville, Kentucky
- Participants: Ronald Reagan; Walter Mondale
- Moderator(s): Barbara Walters of ABC

First debate between Ronald Reagan and Walter Mondale on October 7, 1984

The first presidential debate between President Ronald Reagan and former Vice President Walter Mondale took place on Sunday, October 7, 1984, at The Kentucky Center for the Performing Arts in Louisville, Kentucky. The debate was moderated by Barbara Walters of ABC News and featured a panel featuring James Wieghart of New York Daily News, Diane Sawyer of CBS News, and Fred Barnes of New Republic. The topics were economic and domestic policy issues.

Despite trailing far behind Reagan in the polls leading up to the debate, Mondale exceeded expectations and emerged as the clear winner of the first debate. According to a Newsweek/Gallup poll, 54 percent of debate-watchers favored Mondale, while only 35 percent sided with Reagan. President Reagan was perceived as confused and tired during the debate, whereas Mondale demonstrated articulate communication. This praised performance briefly revitalized the Mondale campaign, narrowing Reagan's lead in the polls by seven points.

== October 11: Vice presidential debate (Pennsylvania Hall Civic Center) ==
Vice presidential debate
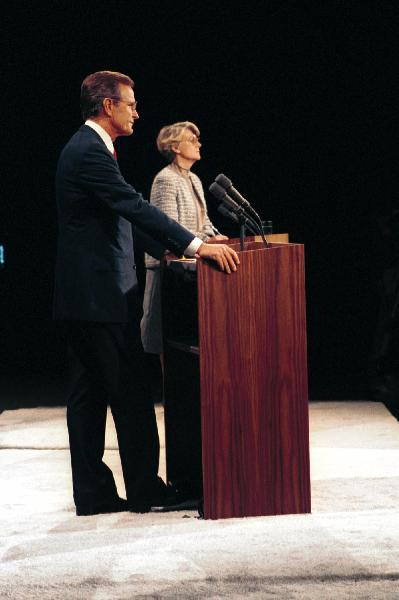
- Date(s): October 11, 1984
- Duration: 90 minutes
- Venue: Pennsylvania Hall Civic Center
- Location: Philadelphia, Pennsylvania
- Participants: George H. W. Bush; Geraldine Ferraro
- Moderator(s): Sander Vanocur of ABC

External videos
- Vice Presidential Candidates Debate, October 11, 1984, C-SPAN

The only vice presidential debate between Vice President George H. W. Bush and Congresswoman Geraldine Ferraro took place on Thursday, October 11, 1984, at the Pennsylvania Hall Civic Center in Philadelphia, Pennsylvania. The debate was moderated by Sander Vanocur of ABC News and featured a panel featuring John Mashek of U.S. News & World Report, Jack White of Time magazine, Norma Quarles of NBC News, and Robert Boyd of Knight-Ridder Newspapers. The topics were domestic and foreign affairs.

The result was proclaimed mostly even by newspapers, television, other media, and historians. Women voters tended to think Ferraro had won, while men, Bush. Some media, however, either declared Bush or Ferraro the winner. The candidates were both praised for their ability to debate.

=== Bush, Ferraro experience exchange ===
Ferraro handled a question about her experience at the debate, after being asked how her three House terms stacked up with Bush's two House terms, career as an ambassador to China and the United Nations, Director of Central Intelligence and four years as vice president. The peak of the experience battle came when, during a discussion of the Carter administration in Iran and the Reagan administration in Lebanon, Bush said, "Let me help you with the difference, Mrs. Ferraro, between Iran and the embassy in Lebanon." Ferraro responded to cap what The New York Times termed "a bristling exchange", "Let me just say first of all, that I almost resent, Vice President Bush, your patronizing attitude that you have to teach me about foreign policy."

== October 21: Second presidential debate (Music Hall, Municipal Auditorium) ==
Second presidential debate
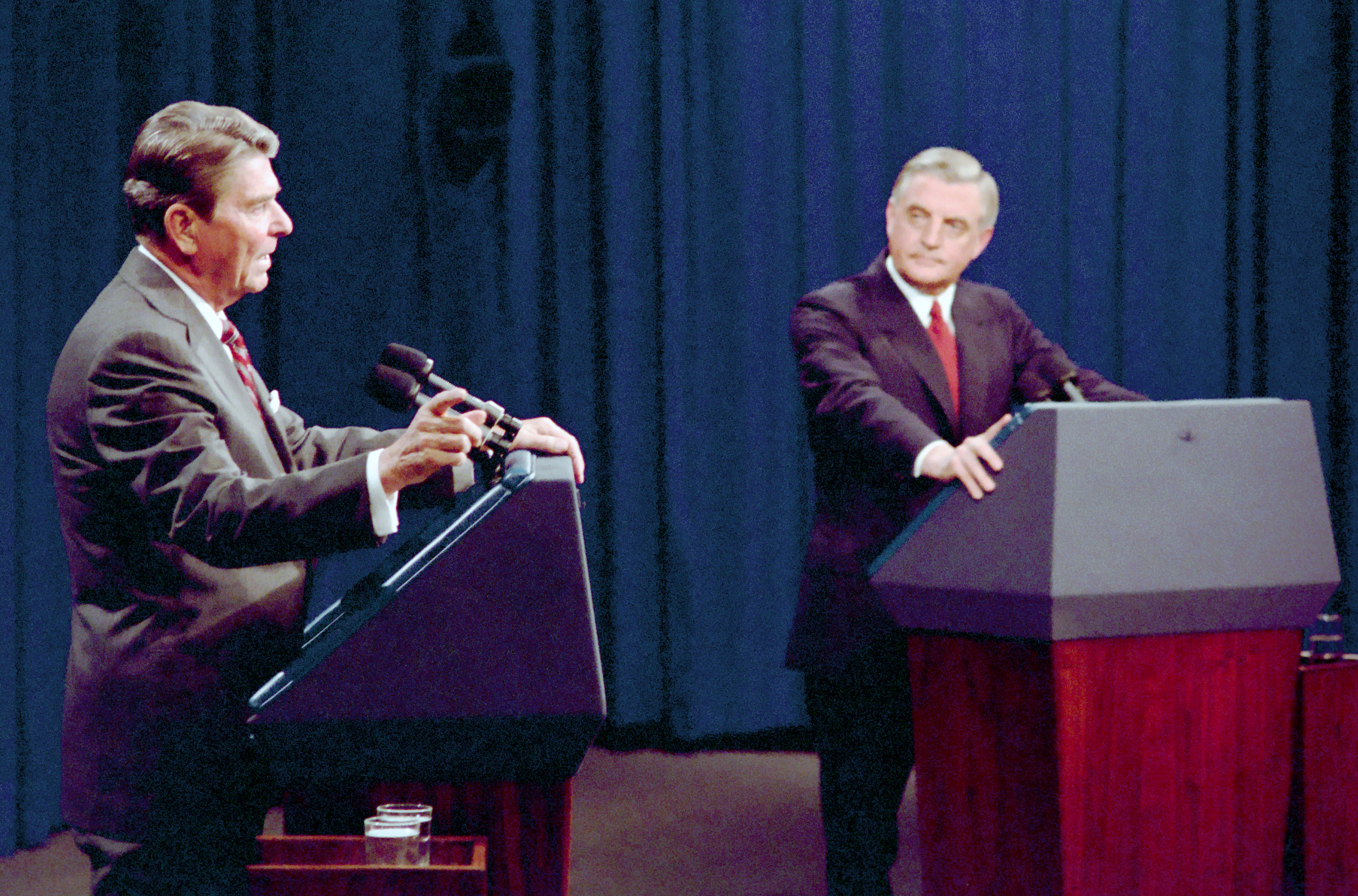
- Date(s): October 21, 1984
- Duration: 90 minutes
- Venue: Music Hall, Municipal Auditorium
- Location: Kansas City, Missouri
- Participants: Ronald Reagan; Walter Mondale
- Moderator(s): Edwin Newman of NBC (formerly)

Second debate between Ronald Reagan and Walter Mondale on October 21, 1984

The second and final presidential debate between President Ronald Reagan and former Vice President Walter Mondale took place on Sunday, October 21, 1984, at the Music Hall, Municipal Auditors in Kansas City, Missouri. The debate was moderated by Edwin Newman, formerly of NBC News and featured a panel featuring Georgie Anne Geyer of Universal Press Syndicate, Marvin Kalb of NBC News, journalist Henry Trewhitt and Morton Kondracke of New Republic. The topics were defense and foreign policy issues.

The debate is often seen as a victory for Reagan, most famously due to the line "I will not make age an issue of this campaign. I am not going to exploit, for political purposes, my opponent's youth and inexperience," it was received with laughter from the audience, and Mondale himself. Mondale later said that it was this moment when he realized he would lose the election.

== See also ==
- Ronald Reagan 1984 presidential campaign
- Walter Mondale 1984 presidential campaign
- 1984 United States presidential election
