= Henry Trewhitt =

American journalist and author

- Born: April 17, 1927; Cleveland, Tennessee
- Died: January 23, 2003 (aged 75); Albuquerque, New Mexico
- Occupations: Journalist, author
- Spouse: Barbara Trewhitt
- Children: 1

Henry Lane "Hank" Trewhitt (April 17, 1927, in Cleveland, Tennessee – January 23, 2003, in Albuquerque, New Mexico) was an American journalist and author.

== Early life and education ==
Trewhitt was born on April 17, 1927, on a farm in Cleveland, Tennessee. He received his journalism degree from the University of New Mexico in 1949. Soon after graduating, he worked for the Santa Fe New Mexican, where he covered the development of the first thermonuclear bomb at Los Alamos National Laboratory. At the age of 25, he became the youngest individual to be awarded a Nieman Fellowship at the time.

== Career ==
Trewhitt worked for the Baltimore Sun as the chief of their Bonn, Germany bureau from 1957 to 1967, and then worked as a diplomatic and White House correspondent for Newsweek until 1974, when he returned to the Sun, this time becoming its diplomatic correspondent. In 1971, he published McNamara: His Ordeal in the Pentagon, a book about Defense Secretary Robert McNamara. The book was based on Trewhitt's experiences covering the United States Department of Defense for Newsweek in 1965. He was a panel journalist at two presidential debates: a Ford-Carter debate in 1976 and the second Reagan-Mondale debate of 1984. He was a frequent panelist on PBS's Washington Week In Review for 20 years. In the 1980s, he worked as the deputy managing editor for international affairs at U.S. News & World Report, in which capacity he defended the magazine's correspondent Nicholas Daniloff after Daniloff was arrested in the USSR. In 1989, he retired from U.S. News & World Report to become a professor of journalism at the University of New Mexico, where he taught until 1997 and continued to coach students until his death in 2003. In 1996, he received the University of New Mexico's James F. Zimmerman Award.

=== 1984 presidential debate ===
Trewhitt questioning Reagan about his age.

While he was a diplomatic correspondent for the Baltimore Sun, Trewhitt was one of four panel journalists who asked questions to Ronald Reagan and Walter Mondale at their second and final of the 1984 United States presidential debates. The other three journalists on the panel were Georgie Anne Geyer, Marvin Kalb, and Morton Kondracke. At the debate, he asked Reagan a famous question about whether he thought his advanced age would impair his ability to function as president. Trewhitt had previously worked together with his Sun colleague Jack Germond for several hours to devise the question. Their aim was to frame the question so as to make it difficult for Reagan to avoid the issue of age, which they considered to be his "greatest vulnerability". The age question had grown more pointed after a difficult time for the president—he "stumbled over words, mangled his own familiar stories, repeated mind-numbing statistics, rambled through his closing statement, and seemed to lose track of the rules at one point"—in the first debate. The question Trewhitt asked President Reagan was as follows:

"Mr. President, I want to raise an issue that I think has been lurking out there for 2 or 3 weeks and cast it specifically in national security terms. You already are the oldest president in history, and some of your staff say you were tired after your most recent encounter with Mr. Mondale. I recall, yet, that President Kennedy, who had to go for days on end with very little sleep during the Cuba missile crisis. Is there any doubt in your mind that you would be able to function in such circumstances?

Reagan replied,

Not at all. And, Mr. Trewhitt, I want you to know that also I will not make age an issue of this campaign. I am not going to exploit, for political purposes, my opponent's youth and inexperience.

This answer was met with an uproar of laughter from the audience, and even Mondale himself laughed along with them. The following day, David S. Broder wrote that "...it may well have been that the biggest barrier to Reagan's reelection was swept away in that moment." Since then, Reagan's response to Trewhitt's question has been praised as a "hit out of the park", and Mondale himself later said that he thought it effectively ended the race. Trewhitt's immediate followup to Reagan was "Mr. President, I'd like to head for the fence and try to catch that one before it goes over, but I'll go on to another question." Reagan's chief of staff James A. Baker later recounted the efforts to prepare for the question and "insist[ed the answer] ... had not been scripted ahead."

== Death ==
Trewhitt died on January 23, 2003, at his home in Albuquerque, at the age of 75, after suffering from emphysema. He was survived by his wife, Barbara Parnall Trewhitt, their son and two grandchildren, as well as by his sister.
