= Lake, Michigan =

Lake, Michigan may refer to any of several places in the U.S. state of Michigan:

- Lake, Clare County, Michigan, an unincorporated community in Garfield Township
- Lake Township, Michigan (disambiguation), eight places
- Lake County, Michigan
- Lake City, Michigan

Lake Michigan may also refer to:

- Lake Michigan, one of the five Great Lakes

== See also ==
- List of lakes in Michigan
