= 1984 United States presidential election in Minnesota =

- November 6, 1984
- Turnout: 70.94% (▼1.2 pp)

Nominee	Walter Mondale	Ronald Reagan
Party	Democratic (DFL)	Ind.-Republican
Home state	Minnesota	California
Running mate	Geraldine Ferraro	George H. W. Bush
Electoral vote	10	0
Popular vote	1,036,364	1,032,603
Percentage	49.72%	49.54%

Mondale
40–50%
50–60%
60–70%
70–80%
80–90%
90–100%
Reagan
40–50%
50–60%
60–70%
70–80%
80–90%
90–100%
Other
No Votes
Tie
President before election
Ronald Reagan
Republican
Elected President
Ronald Reagan
Republican

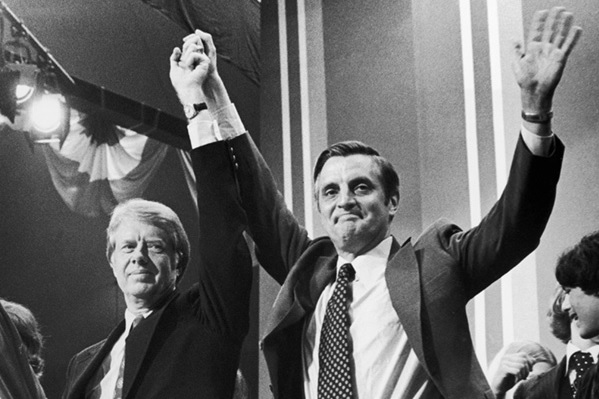
Mondale and former President Jimmy Carter celebrate Mondale's March 13th successes in the 1984 primaries, Minneapolis, Minnesota.

The 1984 United States presidential election in Minnesota took place on November 6, 1984, as part of the 1984 United States presidential election. Voters chose ten representatives, or electors to the Electoral College, who voted for president and vice president.

Minnesota voted for the DFL candidate, former Vice President Walter Mondale. He narrowly won his home state over incumbent President Ronald Reagan by just 3,761 votes, giving him his only state victory in the election (Mondale also carried the District of Columbia), resulting in the state weighing in at around 18 percentage points more Democratic than the nation at large. Minnesota was the only state not to back Reagan in either of his two presidential campaigns. Although Mondale won only twenty of the state's 87 counties – making Reagan the only presidential nominee to win a majority of counties in every state – his large majorities in the heavily unionized Iron Range of the northeast overbalanced Reagan's majorities in the more Republican west of the state. Had Reagan overcome Mondale's 3,761 vote margin, he would have been the first nominee since 1820 to carry all the states, with Nixon's 1972 49-state victory being less narrow both on account of Massachusetts's 14 electoral votes and the margin of 220,000 votes (nearly 9%).

As Reagan won all 49 other states in 1984, this established Minnesota's status as the state with the longest streak of voting Democratic. As of 2024, it still has not voted for a Republican presidential candidate since Richard Nixon carried it when he was re-elected in 1972, though this remains the closest that a Republican presidential candidate has come to carrying the state since then. However, the District of Columbia has voted Democratic in all presidential elections since 1964, when it was first granted the right to vote in presidential elections. As of 2020, only five of the 20 counties Mondale won in 1984 were won by either Hillary Clinton in 2016 or Joe Biden in 2020. Some examples of counties that have been lost to the Republican Party include those after 1996 (Anoka County), after 2008 (Aitkin County), or after 2012 (Itasca County). Carlton County also abandoned the Democrats after 2020, leaving just four Mondale counties to also vote for Kamala Harris in 2024. Minnesota regenerated as a left-leaning force in the 1990s, late 2000s, and early 2010s, but has become a Democratic-leaning state in the 21st century, ironically with many former rural Mondale counties voting Republican in the 21st century. As Mondale won the state with a plurality, he became the only major party nominee to fail to get a majority of the vote in any state since William Howard Taft in 1912. Lac qui Parle County would not vote Republican again until 2016.

Despite Mondale carrying his home state, Republican Senator Rudy Boschwitz was re-elected the same night. When Reagan was asked in December 1984 what he wanted for Christmas, he joked, "Well, Minnesota would have been nice". This was also the first time in history that a Republican president was elected twice without ever carrying Minnesota at least once, and the first of any party since Woodrow Wilson did so in 1916. This feat has since been repeated twice, in 2004 and 2024.

== Results ==
1984 United States presidential election in Minnesota
Party	Candidate	Votes	Percentage	Electoral votes
Democratic-Farmer-Labor	Walter Mondale	1,036,364	49.72%	10
Republican	Ronald Reagan (incumbent)	1,032,603	49.54%	0
Independent Democrat	Lyndon LaRouche	3,865	0.19%	0
Socialist Workers	Melvin Mason	3,180	0.15%	0
Libertarian	David Bergland	2,996	0.14%	0
America First	Bob Richards	2,377	0.11%	0
Citizens	Sonia Johnson	1,219	0.06%	0
Write-ins	Write-ins	723	0.03%	0
Communist	Gus Hall	630	0.03%	0
Workers League	Edward Winn	260	0.01%	0
New Alliance	Dennis Serrette	232	0.01%	0
Invalid or blank votes				—
Totals		2,084,449	100.00%	10
Voter turnout		68%		—

=== Results by county ===
County	Walter Mondale DFL		Ronald Reagan Republican		Various candidates Other parties		Margin		Total votes cast
County	#	%	#	%	#	%	#	%	Total votes cast
Aitkin	3,943	53.17%	3,422	46.14%	51	0.69%	521	7.03%	7,416
Anoka	50,305	51.63%	46,578	47.80%	557	0.57%	3,727	3.83%	97,440
Becker	5,456	41.65%	7,553	57.65%	92	0.70%	-2,097	-16.00%	13,101
Beltrami	7,481	49.88%	7,414	49.43%	103	0.69%	67	0.45%	14,998
Benton	4,922	41.42%	6,830	57.48%	131	1.10%	-1,908	-16.06%	11,883
Big Stone	1,994	51.83%	1,821	47.34%	32	0.83%	173	4.49%	3,847
Blue Earth	11,877	45.08%	14,298	54.27%	172	0.65%	-2,421	-9.19%	26,347
Brown	4,469	34.44%	8,399	64.72%	109	0.84%	-3,930	-30.28%	12,977
Carlton	9,189	64.70%	4,877	34.34%	137	0.96%	4,312	30.36%	14,203
Carver	6,725	35.75%	11,963	63.60%	121	0.64%	-5,238	-27.85%	18,809
Cass	4,773	41.61%	6,619	57.71%	78	0.68%	-1,846	-16.10%	11,470
Chippewa	3,047	43.01%	3,964	55.95%	74	1.04%	-917	-12.94%	7,085
Chisago	6,683	51.21%	6,279	48.12%	87	0.67%	404	3.09%	13,049
Clay	10,294	46.84%	11,565	52.62%	119	0.54%	-1,271	-5.78%	21,978
Clearwater	1,917	47.63%	2,066	51.33%	42	1.04%	-149	-3.70%	4,025
Cook	1,129	47.82%	1,219	51.63%	13	0.55%	-90	-3.81%	2,361
Cottonwood	3,073	41.61%	4,275	57.89%	37	0.50%	-1,202	-16.28%	7,385
Crow Wing	8,719	43.10%	11,362	56.16%	151	0.75%	-2,643	-13.06%	20,232
Dakota	49,125	46.83%	55,119	52.54%	667	0.64%	-5,994	-5.71%	104,911
Dodge	2,786	38.36%	4,428	60.97%	48	0.66%	-1,642	-22.61%	7,262
Douglas	5,444	37.43%	9,005	61.92%	94	0.65%	-3,561	-24.49%	14,543
Faribault	3,993	41.01%	5,690	58.44%	53	0.54%	-1,697	-17.43%	9,736
Fillmore	4,351	40.44%	6,342	58.94%	67	0.62%	-1,991	-18.50%	10,760
Freeborn	9,338	52.26%	8,413	47.09%	116	0.65%	925	5.17%	17,867
Goodhue	8,679	43.44%	11,171	55.92%	128	0.64%	-2,492	-12.48%	19,978
Grant	1,867	46.73%	2,111	52.84%	17	0.43%	-244	-6.11%	3,995
Hennepin	272,401	51.47%	253,921	47.98%	2,912	0.55%	18,480	3.49%	529,234
Houston	3,512	37.99%	5,645	61.06%	88	0.95%	-2,133	-23.07%	9,245
Hubbard	2,806	37.50%	4,621	61.76%	55	0.74%	-1,815	-24.26%	7,482
Isanti	5,378	48.38%	5,660	50.91%	79	0.71%	-282	-2.53%	11,117
Itasca	11,455	54.68%	9,306	44.42%	187	0.89%	2,149	10.26%	20,948
Jackson	3,437	51.89%	3,131	47.27%	55	0.83%	306	4.62%	6,623
Kanabec	2,660	46.47%	3,027	52.88%	37	0.65%	-367	-6.41%	5,724
Kandiyohi	8,402	46.41%	9,539	52.69%	163	0.90%	-1,137	-6.28%	18,104
Kittson	1,610	48.07%	1,716	51.24%	23	0.69%	-106	-3.17%	3,349
Koochiching	4,238	54.74%	3,466	44.77%	38	0.49%	772	9.97%	7,742
Lac qui Parle	2,685	48.84%	2,731	49.68%	81	1.47%	-46	-0.84%	5,497
Lake	4,468	68.43%	2,003	30.68%	58	0.89%	2,465	37.75%	6,529
Lake of the Woods	824	42.47%	1,094	56.39%	22	1.13%	-270	-13.92%	1,940
Le Sueur	5,070	45.47%	6,033	54.10%	48	0.43%	-963	-8.63%	11,151
Lincoln	1,827	48.04%	1,905	50.09%	71	1.87%	-78	-2.05%	3,803
Lyon	5,389	42.57%	7,170	56.64%	100	0.79%	-1,781	-14.07%	12,659
Mahnomen	1,241	47.79%	1,328	51.14%	28	1.08%	-87	-3.35%	2,597
Marshall	2,705	43.58%	3,433	55.31%	69	1.11%	-728	-11.73%	6,207
Martin	4,673	38.80%	7,308	60.67%	64	0.53%	-2,635	-21.87%	12,045
McLeod	4,864	35.43%	8,728	63.58%	135	0.98%	-3,864	-28.15%	13,727
Meeker	4,156	42.76%	5,511	56.70%	53	0.55%	-1,355	-13.94%	9,720
Mille Lacs	4,011	47.92%	4,307	51.45%	53	0.63%	-296	-3.53%	8,371
Morrison	6,225	44.85%	7,556	54.44%	99	0.71%	-1,331	-9.59%	13,880
Mower	12,498	60.53%	8,054	39.01%	95	0.46%	4,444	21.52%	20,647
Murray	2,741	49.17%	2,780	49.87%	54	0.97%	-39	-0.70%	5,575
Nicollet	5,789	43.37%	7,472	55.97%	88	0.66%	-1,683	-12.60%	13,349
Nobles	4,619	48.09%	4,876	50.77%	110	1.15%	-257	-2.68%	9,605
Norman	2,202	50.31%	2,152	49.17%	23	0.53%	50	1.14%	4,377
Olmsted	16,335	36.44%	28,129	62.76%	359	0.80%	-11,794	-26.32%	44,823
Otter Tail	9,714	38.02%	15,664	61.30%	173	0.68%	-5,950	-23.28%	25,551
Pennington	2,913	44.89%	3,536	54.49%	40	0.62%	-623	-9.60%	6,489
Pine	5,223	53.41%	4,493	45.95%	63	0.64%	730	7.46%	9,779
Pipestone	2,391	43.46%	3,043	55.32%	67	1.22%	-652	-11.86%	5,501
Polk	7,033	44.56%	8,617	54.60%	132	0.84%	-1,584	-10.04%	15,782
Pope	2,757	47.03%	3,064	52.27%	41	0.70%	-307	-5.24%	5,862
Ramsey	141,623	59.15%	95,667	39.95%	2,153	0.90%	45,956	19.20%	239,443
Red Lake	1,294	51.91%	1,184	47.49%	15	0.60%	110	4.42%	2,493
Redwood	2,957	32.64%	6,020	66.45%	82	0.91%	-3,063	-33.81%	9,059
Renville	3,972	41.25%	5,571	57.86%	86	0.89%	-1,599	-16.61%	9,629
Rice	10,880	50.55%	10,456	48.58%	189	0.88%	424	1.97%	21,525
Rock	2,188	42.11%	2,971	57.18%	37	0.71%	-783	-15.07%	5,196
Roseau	2,319	39.91%	3,445	59.28%	47	0.81%	-1,126	-19.37%	5,811
St. Louis	77,683	68.83%	34,162	30.27%	1,013	0.90%	43,521	38.56%	112,858
Scott	9,452	42.71%	12,573	56.81%	108	0.49%	-3,121	-14.10%	22,133
Sherburne	6,140	43.98%	7,738	55.43%	82	0.59%	-1,598	-11.45%	13,960
Sibley	2,761	36.97%	4,638	62.10%	69	0.92%	-1,877	-25.13%	7,468
Stearns	20,944	40.55%	30,216	58.51%	485	0.94%	-9,272	-17.96%	51,645
Steele	5,060	36.38%	8,780	63.12%	70	0.50%	-3,720	-26.74%	13,910
Stevens	2,451	42.66%	3,251	56.58%	44	0.77%	-800	-13.92%	5,746
Swift	3,531	54.42%	2,893	44.59%	64	0.99%	638	9.83%	6,488
Todd	4,657	41.19%	6,585	58.25%	63	0.56%	-1,928	-17.06%	11,305
Traverse	1,325	48.30%	1,399	51.00%	19	0.69%	-74	-2.70%	2,743
Wabasha	3,872	41.87%	5,299	57.31%	76	0.82%	-1,427	-15.44%	9,247
Wadena	2,454	36.13%	4,306	63.40%	32	0.47%	-1,852	-27.27%	6,792
Waseca	3,527	38.80%	5,509	60.60%	55	0.60%	-1,982	-21.80%	9,091
Washington	28,527	49.23%	29,046	50.13%	369	0.64%	-519	-0.90%	57,942
Watonwan	2,425	40.57%	3,526	58.98%	27	0.45%	-1,101	-18.41%	5,978
Wilkin	1,410	37.14%	2,367	62.36%	19	0.50%	-957	-25.22%	3,796
Winona	9,577	43.99%	11,981	55.03%	212	0.97%	-2,404	-11.04%	21,770
Wright	12,486	44.45%	15,399	54.82%	205	0.73%	-2,913	-10.37%	28,090
Yellow Medicine	3,018	43.64%	3,819	55.22%	79	1.14%	-801	-11.58%	6,916
Totals	1,036,364	49.72%	1,032,603	49.54%	15,482	0.74%	3,761	0.18%	2,084,449

County Flips: Democratic Hold Gain from Republican / Republican Hold Gain from Democratic

==== Counties that flipped from Republican to Democratic ====
- Big Stone
- Freeborn
- Jackson

==== Counties that flipped from Democratic to Republican ====
- Clearwater
- Dakota
- Isanti
- Kanabec
- Mille Lacs
- Morrison
- Scott
- Sherburne
- Washington
- Wright

== See also ==
- 1984 United States presidential election in the District of Columbia, the only other place that voted Democratic in the 1984 presidential election.
- 1972 United States presidential election in Massachusetts, the only state to vote Democratic in 1972, like Minnesota was in 1984.
- United States presidential elections in Minnesota
