= James Wieghart =

American editor

James Gerard Wieghart (/ˈwiːhɑːrt/ WEE-hart; August 16, 1933 (Niles, Michigan) – February 21, 2010 (Clare, Michigan)) was an American editor and newspaperman and a minor figure in the Iran Contra affair.

== Career ==
Wiegart grew up mostly in Niles, Michigan. After high school, he enlisted in the U.S. Army, serving mostly in Alaska, from 1951 to 1954. He attended Central Michigan University before graduating from the University of Wisconsin. He worked at the Milwaukee Journal and the Milwaukee Sentinel, which appointed him as Washington bureau chief in 1966. Around the same time, in 1965 was press secretary for William Proxmire, U.S. Senator from Wisconsin.

In 1969, Wieghart joined the New York Daily News, for which he would cover the Nixon, Ford and Carter administrations. He reported on the U.S. Department of Defense during the waning years of the Vietnam War (writing from Vietnam for several weeks in 1971) and covered the White House during the Watergate scandal. In 1975 he became the paper's Washington bureau chief and wrote a thrice-weekly opinion column on which he argued from the left on a wide range of issues, from health care to the Middle East, and parsed presidential politics. Wieghart then was editor from 1982 to 1984, leaving after the newspaper changed publishers, to take a job as a columnist and national political correspondent for Scripps Howard Newspapers. During the 1984 presidential campaign, he questioned both Walter F. Mondale and Ronald Reagan in the lead-up to the election.

In 1986 he left journalism to serve as staff director for Edward M. Kennedy, U.S. Senator from Massachusetts. The next year he was hired by Judge Lawrence E. Walsh, the independent counsel who was investigating the involvement of Reagan administration officials in two illegal enterprises: the sale of arms to Iran in contravention of United States policy and the diversion of profits from the sale to the Contras, the forces fighting Nicaragua's leftist government, in spite of a congressional prohibition on providing any aid to the rebels. For two years he was the public information officer for the investigation, which lasted six years, and he helped write and edit the final report in 1993. He returned to Central Michigan University as chairman of the journalism department from 1989 to 1993. Then he joined the Dilenschneider Group, a New York-based public relations firm, where he worked as a consultant until 2009.

== Personal life ==
In addition to his wife, Sharon, whom he met at Central Michigan and married in 1955, he was survived by two sisters, Patricia Graham and Mary Lois Armstrong, both of Niles; four daughters, Michelle Wieghart of Beldenville, Wisconsin; Elizabeth Queen of Lake, Michigan; Bridget Wieghart of Portland, Oregon; and Rebecca Eaton of Silver Spring, Maryland; and six grandchildren.

== Death ==
Wieghart died in Clare, in central Michigan. He was 76 and lived in nearby Lake City, Michigan. According to his wife, the cause of death was complications of pneumonia.
