= 1984 United States presidential election in the District of Columbia =

- November 6, 1984

Nominee	Walter Mondale	Ronald Reagan
Party	Democratic	Republican
Home state	Minnesota	California
Running mate	Geraldine Ferarro	George H. W. Bush
Electoral vote	3	0
Popular vote	180,408	29,009
Percentage	85.38%	13.73%
Ward results
Mondale
60–70%
70–80%
80–90%
90–100%
President before election
Ronald Reagan
Republican
Elected President
Ronald Reagan
Republican

The 1984 United States presidential election in the District of Columbia was held on November 6, 1984 as part of the 1984 United States presidential election. Democratic candidate Walter Mondale won D.C. with 85% of the vote, giving him three electoral votes. In the general election, he only carried a total of 13 electoral votes, the other 10 coming from his home state of Minnesota. The incumbent Ronald Reagan won re-election in 1984, carrying 49 U.S. states.

Mondale's victory in the District of Columbia was the largest out of any location and was one of only two electoral jurisdictions to vote Democratic. Amid a Reagan landslide nationwide, the District weighed in 89.9% more Democratic than the national average, the furthest from the national average it has ever voted.

== Results ==
1984 United States presidential election in the District of Columbia
Party	Candidate	Votes	Percentage	Electoral votes
Democratic	Walter Mondale	180,408	85.38%	3
Republican	Ronald Reagan	29,009	13.73%	0
All Others		1,871	0.88%	0
Invalid or blank votes				—
Totals		211,288	100.00%	3

== See also ==
- United States presidential elections in the District of Columbia
- 1984 United States presidential election in Minnesota, the only other place to vote Democratic in the 1984 United States presidential election
