= Budget freeze =

Pause to government spending

A budget freeze is when a budget for an aspect of government or business is fixed or frozen at a specific level. One can be applied in a business to increase profits as well as in a government, often to reduce taxes.

Budget freezes become especially notable in difficult economic situations. In these cases, businesses can have problems acquiring funds, necessitating a reduction in spending. During times of economic or financial crisis, the government also loses revenue and faces pressure to lower tax burdens. This means that budget freezes may be used as a way of reducing money spent.

== Reasons for a budget freeze ==
There are many different reasons for a business or a government to implement a budget freeze. In the case of a loss of profit or tax revenue, the budget may need to be cut or frozen so that a company or a government does not spend more than its intake. An excess in spending can also necessitate a budget freeze.

=== Government ===
In government, a politician may implement a budget freeze to lower the amount of money spent on programs or wages, thus allowing a decrease in taxes. Some argue that while these politicians want credit for reducing- or at least not increasing- taxes, they want nothing to do with the result of these reductions (losses in Welfare, freezes on teachers’ wages).

=== Business ===
When businesses face losses or increases in prices, they can also implement budget freezes to fix spending and prevent further loss in profits. This is especially true during times of economic difficulty.

== Effects of a budget freeze ==
A reduction in the amount of money spent is the most obvious and intended effect of a budget freeze. But a budget freeze can have other- often unintended- consequences. When a government freezes a budget, taxes can be reduced. When a budget freeze successfully lowers the amount of money that a business or government spends, the act of freezing the budget can gain positive media for saving money. Some believe that this, rather than the actual reduction in costs, is often the reason behind a budget freeze.

When a budget freeze is aimed at the amount of money spent on wages, many workers are denied benefits, bonuses, and wage increases. Governments can use budget freezes on organizations and programs that they fund. While this does decrease the budget and save money, it also takes money away from what some consider beneficial- if not necessary- government funded programs.

=== Effects of budget freezes on education(USA) ===
Budget freezes and cuts can negatively influence public education. In the United States, School districts have frozen teachers' pay without providing cost of living increases. These types of freezes on teachers' wages can cause strikes. Budget freezes can also increase the amount of money students need to pay for education, possibly decreasing the likelihood of attending college. While teachers oppose freezes on salaries, school districts claim that the freezes are necessary to continue funding other aspects of education and keep teachers employed rather than firing other employees to provide cost-of-living and seniority raises.

== Controversy ==
Freezing a budget, whether for government programs, wages, or other things, affects many people. This can be both positive and negative. A budget freeze can have political implications, especially in the case of the government, but also where businesses are concerned. They can do this by affecting policy or by increasing or decreasing the approval rating for a politician.

== Past budget freezes in the USA ==
=== Budget freezes in 2009 ===
The recent economy has caused problems in business and government, leading to budget cuts and budget freezes. Wage freezes can lead to reduced spending at the individual level, which, in turn, leads to reduced revenues for government and business. This can cause the recession to feed on itself. During his presidency, former United States President George W. Bush proposed many budget freezes in order to alleviate economic problems, including freezes on the United States Department of Education, domestic programs such as health care, the U.S. Department of Health and Human Services, and the National Science Foundation.

=== Flexible freeze ===
In the late 1980s, U.S. President George H. W. Bush also proposed a flexible freeze, which would increase budget according to inflation and population growth for certain government programs, but completely freeze others. Some viewed this as a political tactic and accused Bush and his associates of being inconsistent with the use of the term freeze. This proposal caused difficulties for Congress, especially among Democrats, as the budget cuts would force some programs to reduce contributions because of population growth and inflation and many claimed that Bush wanted to take credit for the cuts while forcing Congress to make all of the difficult decisions. When Bush did make his own priorities clear, there was a clear correlation to the freezes that Ronald Reagan had approved.

== See also ==
- Fiscal crisis
- Fiscal policy
- Government spending
- Recession
