= Lake Township, Michigan =

Lake Township is the name of some places in the U.S. state of Michigan:

- Lake Township, Benzie County, Michigan
- Lake Charter Township, Michigan in Berrien County
- Lake Township, Huron County, Michigan
- Lake Township, Lake County, Michigan
- Lake Township, Macomb County, Michigan, former civil township
- Lake Township, Menominee County, Michigan
- Lake Township, Missaukee County, Michigan
- Lake Township, Roscommon County, Michigan

== See also ==
- Lakefield Township, Luce County, Michigan
- Lakefield Township, Saginaw County, Michigan
- Laketon Township, Michigan in Muskegon County
- Laketown Township, Michigan in Allegan County
- Lake Township (disambiguation)
