= Georgie Anne Geyer =

American journalist (1935–2019)

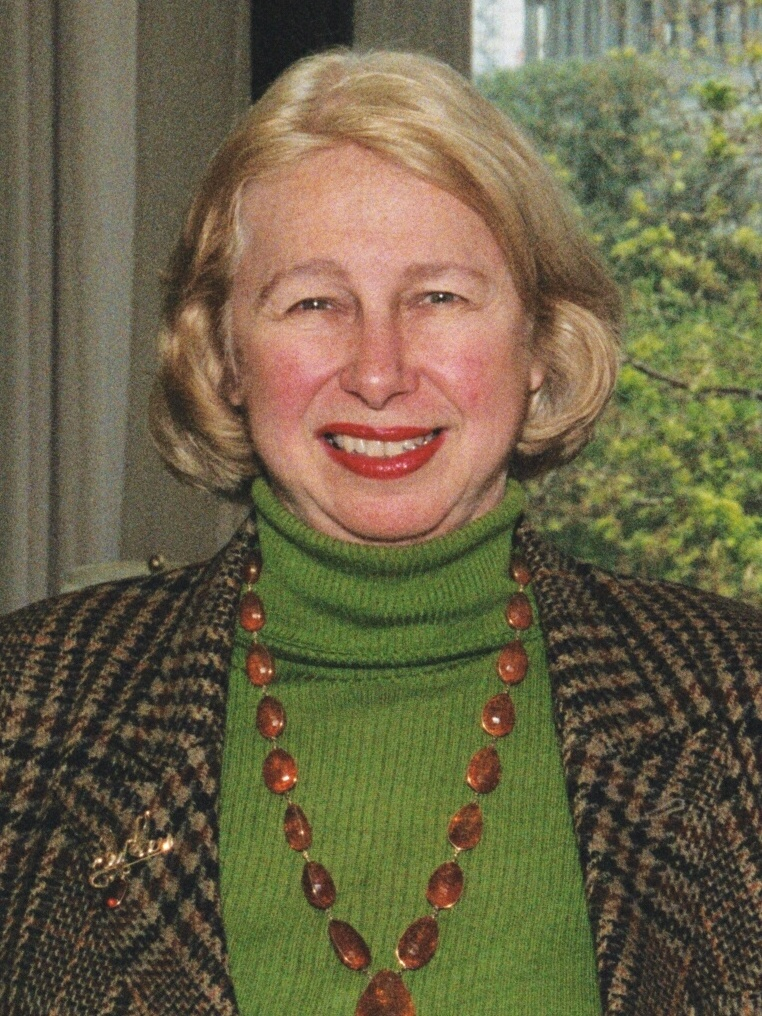
Geyer in 2002

Georgie Anne Geyer (April 2, 1935 – May 15, 2019) was an American journalist who covered the world as a foreign correspondent for the Chicago Daily News and then became a syndicated columnist for the Universal Press Syndicate. Her columns focused on foreign affairs issues and appeared in approximately 120 newspapers in North and South America. She was the author of ten books, including a biography of Fidel Castro and a memoir of her life as a foreign correspondent, Buying the Night Flight.

== Early life and education ==
Geyer was born in Chicago, and graduated from Calumet High School. She graduated from the Medill School of Journalism at Northwestern University in 1956, where she was a member of Alpha Chi Omega sorority. She attended the University of Vienna on a Fulbright Scholarship. She spoke Spanish, Portuguese, German, and Russian.

== Professional career ==
Her first job was with the Chicago Southtown Economist. From 1959 to 1974, Geyer was a reporter for the now-defunct Chicago Daily News, where she worked from society reporting to the news desk and eventually foreign correspondent. After leaving the paper, she began her syndicated column.

In 1973, she was the first Western reporter to interview Saddam Hussein, then Vice President of Iraq. She also interviewed Yasser Arafat, Anwar Sadat, King Hussein of Jordan, Muammar al-Gaddafi, and the Ayatollah Khomeini. She reported on rebels in the Dominican Republic, was held by authorities in Angola for her reporting during civil war, and was threatened with death by the Mano Blanca death squads in Guatemala.

In 1984, she was a panelist during the second presidential debate.

Geyer had more than 21 honorary degrees, including three from Northwestern alone.

In an October 1996 letter published in the Chicago Tribune, now Judge Ramon Ocasio III criticized Geyer for anti-immigrant and anti-Hispanic rhetoric in her Op-ed "The anti-Columbus Day march."

== Personal life and death ==
In 1992, the CBS sitcom Hearts Afire thinly based its lead female character, Georgie Anne Lahti, on Geyer's life and career. In January 1993, Chicago Tribune columnist Mike Royko excoriated the show's producers for doing so, and stated that Geyer was not pleased with that depiction. "Did the TV producers ask if they could use the real Georgie Anne that way?" Royko wrote. "Not only did they not ask, they loftily deny that their TV Georgie Anne is in any way based on the real life Georgie Anne. A mere coincidence, yuck, yuck. Not to butter you up, but most of my readers are logical. So let me pose this question: If you were a Chicago-born blond named Georgie Anne, had built an international reputation as a foreign correspondent and columnist, and had written an important book about Fidel Castro, and you turned on your TV and saw a lewd sitcom about a Chicago-born blond named Georgie Anne who built a national reputation as a foreign correspondent and had written an important book about Fidel Castro, wouldn't you say something like: 'Hey, what the hell's going on?'"

Geyer developed cancer of the tongue more than a decade before her death. She died at her home in Washington, D.C. on May 15, 2019.

== Books ==
Title	Year	ISBN	Publisher	Subject matter	Interviews, presentations, and reviews	Comments
The New Latins: Fateful Change in South and Central America	1970		Doubleday			
The New 100 Years War	1972		Doubleday			
The Young Russians	1975	ISBN 9780882800219	ETC Publications			
Buying the Night Flight: the Autobiography of a Woman Foreign Correspondent	1983	ISBN 9780440007258	Delacorte Press			
Guerrilla Prince: The Untold Story of Fidel Castro	1991	ISBN 9780316308939	Little, Brown and Co.	Fidel Castro	Booknotes interview with Geyer on Guerrilla Prince, March 10, 1991, C-SPAN; Interview with Geyer on Castro and Cuba, August 24, 1994, C-SPAN; Washington Journal interview with Geyer, "Castro and the Future of Cuba", August 20, 2006, C-SPAN	
Waiting for Winter to End: An Extraordinary Journey Through Soviet Central Asia	1994	ISBN 9780028811109	Brassey's Inc.			
Americans No More: The Death of Citizenship	1996	ISBN 9780871136503	Atlantic Monthly Press	Criticism of multiculturalism	Presentation by Geyer on Americans No More, December 4, 1996, C-SPAN	
Tunisia: A Journey Through a Country That Works	2004	ISBN 9781900988438	Stacey International	Tunisia		
Predicting the Unthinkable, Anticipating the Impossible: From the Fall of the Berlin Wall to America in the New Century	2011	ISBN 9781412814874	Routledge			
When Cats Reigned Like Kings: On the Trail of the Sacred Cats	2017	ISBN 9781138540484	Routledge	Cats, Cultural depictions of cats		
