= Robert Boyd (journalist) =

American journalist (1928–2019)

- Born: Robert Skinner Boyd; January 28, 1928; Chicago, Illinois, US
- Died: September 20, 2019 (aged 91); Philadelphia, Pennsylvania, US
- Education: B.A. and M.A., Harvard University
- Occupations: Journalist and bureau chief
- Employer: Knight Newspaper Group
- Spouse: Gloria L. Paulsen (m. 1949)
- Children: 4
- Awards: Pulitzer Prize, 1973

Robert Skinner Boyd (January 11, 1928 – September 20, 2019) was an American journalist who spent most of his career working for the Knight Newspaper Group, spending two decades as the group's Washington bureau chief. He and Clark Hoyt won a Pulitzer Prize in 1973 for uncovering the fact that Senator Thomas Eagleton, George McGovern's choice for vice president, had had severe psychiatric problems and undergone three shock treatments. Instead of publishing their scoop, they disclosed their findings to McGovern's top advisor, and Eagleton withdrew as the Democratic nominee.

== Early career and education ==
Born in Chicago, Boyd was the son of Alden W. Boyd and Mary A. (Skinner) Boyd. Raised as an Episcopalian, he earned a B.A. and M.A. from Harvard University in 1949. At Harvard, he studied ancient languages.

== Career ==
After serving in the U.S. Army in 1946–1947 and as a staff member in the U.S. State Department in 1950–1953, Boyd worked as a reporter for the Lafayette Louisiana Daily Advertiser between 1953–1954 and as state editor for the Benton Harbor, Michigan News-Palladium in 1954–1957.

He then joined the Detroit Free Press/Knight Newspaper Group, working as a reporter in 1957–1960, as a correspondent in the group's Washington, D.C. office in 1960–1967, as the chief of that bureau in 1967–1987, and as its chief Washington correspondent beginning in 1987.

Boyd toured the Bay of Pigs battlefield with Fidel Castro in 1961, covered the revolution in the Dominican Republic in 1965, toured the USSR in 1967, and spent two weeks in North Vietnam in 1970. He was one of five journalists who accompanied President Nixon to China in 1972 and were allowed to stay for a time after Nixon's departure.

During his 20 years in charge of the Washington bureau, "Boyd presided over an expansion in which the D.C. team grew from a staff of seven to more than 50." Knight colleague James McCartney said Boyd "was the antithesis of the sort of ego-driven Washington bureau chief who stepped all over his reporters....He was the best editor I ever had." The Washington Post reporter David Broder described Boyd as one of the most honest and fair reporters in Washington. "He's totally independent," Broder said. "I have no idea what his politics may be, and I've known him for 30 years."

In 1993 he became Knight Ridder's Washington science writer. "At the age of 71, he found himself spending weeks in Antarctica 'talking to scientists and building igloos.'"

=== Eagleton case ===
In 1972, after receiving a tip to the effect that Democratic presidential candidate George McGovern's running mate, Missouri Senator Thomas Eagleton, had had shock treatments, Boyd and his Knight Newspapers colleague Clark Hoyt did some investigating. Hoyt looked through the files of the St. Louis Post-Dispatch from the 1960s, when Eagleton was state attorney general, and found gaps where Eagleton seemed to "disappear", as well as a report of him being treated "for exhaustion." Hoyt also tracked down a doctor who been present when Eagleton received a shock treatment, but she refused to talk about it. Nonetheless, it became clear to Boyd and Hoyt that Eagleton had received shock treatments.

Instead of writing an article, Boyd and Hoyt went to North Dakota to present McGovern and his campaign chairman Frank Mankiewicz with their evidence and give them a chance to respond. "It was the only fair and decent thing to do," Boyd later said. In return, McGovern "double-crossed" them, in the words of a colleague, James McCartney, by holding a press conference on July 25, 1972, at which Eagleton announced that he had been hospitalized three times for "nervous exhaustion and fatigue" and McGovern expressed confidence in Eagleton's current health. "They said 'Sorry boys, we're going public,'" Boyd later recalled. "It was a frustrating thing for us." By holding the press conference, Mankiewicz blew Boyd's and Hoyt's chances at an exclusive. On July 31, Eagleton withdrew. The incident raised "critical journalistic questions: Had Boyd and Hoyt, in an excess of caution, tossed away a major exclusive by insisting on total confirmation, or had they been rigorously responsible? Was the tip...just another dirty trick by the Nixon crowd? Did that matter, because it turned out to be true? Was it better to have the revelation come against Eagleton the candidate rather than against Eagleton the vice-president? Was the journalistic responsibility to tell the news and let the public decide? Is that what happened?" Although they had been deprived of their scoop, Boyd and Hoyt ended up winning the Pulitzer Prize for uncovering the facts about Eagleton's psychiatric history anyway. One account suggests that Boyd was rewarded at least in part for his "touch of compassion," that the Pulitzer board "tipped its hat to him for his judicious restraint." The prize was described by "one Washington cynic" as "the first time anybody ever won a Pulitzer for a story they didn't write."

== Works ==
Boyd and David Kraslow collaborated on a novel, A Certain Little Evil, published in 1964.

His book The Decline, but Not Yet the Fall, of the Russia Empire: The Lewis Cass Lectures appeared in 1969.

== Honors and awards ==
In 1973, Boyd and Clark Hoyt won the Pulitzer Prize for National Reporting "for their disclosure of United States Senator Thomas Eagleton's history of psychiatric therapy, resulting in his withdrawal as the Democratic Vice Presidential nominee in 1972."

He was a John S. Knight Journalism Fellow at Stanford.

== Personal life ==
He married Gloria L. Paulsen in 1949, and they had four children (Tim, Suzy, Peter and Andy). Boyd died from congestive heart failure at a nursing home in Philadelphia on September 20, 2019.
