= New Hampshire midnight voting =

American election tradition

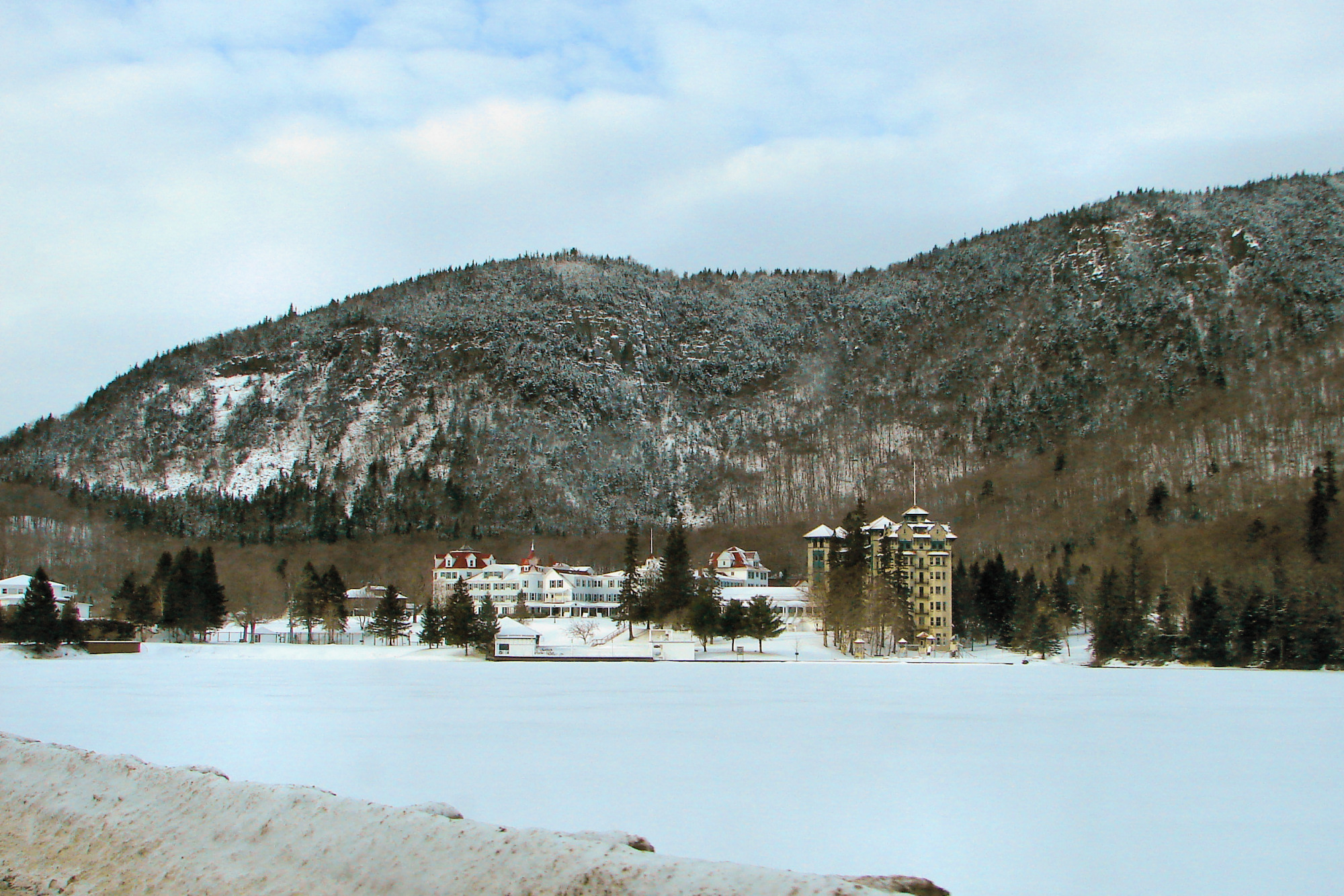
The Balsams Grand Resort Hotel in Dixville Notch, the site of the first "midnight vote" in the New Hampshire primary

In New Hampshire, United States, the communities of Dixville Notch, Hart's Location, and Millsfield all vote at the midnight beginning election day, known as the New Hampshire midnight votes, on the day of the state's political party primaries and general elections, following a tradition that started to accommodate railroad workers who had to be at work before normal voting hours. The voting tradition has been followed in Dixville Notch since the 1960 presidential election, in Hart's Location from 1948 to 1964 and from 1996 to 2020, and in Millsfield in 2016 and 2020.

Although the communities have small populations, some major political candidates campaign in the area due to New Hampshire having the first presidential primary in the nation, with George H. W. Bush, George W. Bush, Bill Clinton, Ronald Reagan, Bob Dole, John McCain, and Dick Gephardt visiting the towns. Multiple third-party candidates, such as Andre Marrou during the 1992 presidential election, have also campaigned in the area to gain media attention.

Towns that conduct midnight voting are allowed to count their votes before the rest of the state due to a New Hampshire rule that states a polling place can close once every registered voter has cast their ballot.

== History ==
New Ashford, Massachusetts, was reputed to be the first place to vote in every presidential election from 1916 to 1932. In 1936, Millsfield, New Hampshire, beat this record by holding its election at midnight. Henry Nadig and his daughter Genevieve were behind the usage of midnight voting in Millsfield and Henry had lobbied the state legislature to allow it. Millsfield continued this practice until the 1960s when there were only two registered voters left in town, Genevieve and her husband Elmer, but restarted in 2016.

The town of Hart's Location established the tradition of early-morning voting in 1948, when residents voted at 7:00 a.m. In 1952, the town moved its voting to midnight, to facilitate greater access to the polls for railroad workers.

Neil Tillotson moved to Dixville Notch in 1954, and became the town moderator and owner of The Balsams Grand Resort Hotel. He did not like having to drive 45 minutes to the nearest polling station, but learned about midnight voting from an Associated Press reporter. The state legislature approved the town's request to become a voting precinct. Neil cast the first vote in each election until his death at age 102 in 2001.

Richard Nixon, in 1960, and Joe Biden, in 2020, are the only presidential candidates to win every vote in Dixville Notch in the general election.

Dixville Notch voted for the final winner of the Republican presidential nomination from 1968 to 2012.

In 2024, the balloting was done in the Tillotson Room of the Balsams Resort as the Ballot Room was closed for renovations.

== 1964 ==
In 1964, both Dixville Notch and Hart's Location gave the majority of their votes to the write-in candidacies of the 1960 Republican presidential and vice presidential candidates Richard Nixon and Henry Cabot Lodge II.

Republican primary
| Town | Lodge | Rockefeller | Nixon | Goldwater | Total |
|---|---|---|---|---|---|
| Dixville Notch | 3 | 2 | 3 | 1 | 9 |
| Hart's Location | 3 | 1 | 0 | 1 | 5 |
| Vote totals | 6 | 3 | 3 | 2 | 14 |
| Percentage | 42.86% | 21.43% | 21.43% | 14.29% | 100.00% |

== 1972 ==
In 1972, Incumbent President Richard Nixon and Senator Edmund Muskie won their respective primaries in Dixville Notch.

Republican primary
| Town | Nixon | Total |
|---|---|---|
| Dixville Notch | 11 | 11 |
| Percentage | 100.00% | 100.00% |

Democratic primary
| Town | Muskie | McGovern | Total |
|---|---|---|---|
| Dixville Notch | 5 | 1 | 6 |
| Percentage | 83.33% | 16.67% | 100.00% |

== 1976 ==
During the 1976 presidential campaign, former California Governor Ronald Reagan was the only major party presidential candidate to visit Dixville Notch. President Gerald Ford won the Republican primary while Georgia Governor Jimmy Carter won the Democratic primary.

Republican primary
| Town | Ford | Reagan | Total |
|---|---|---|---|
| Dixville Notch | 11 | 4 | 15 |
| Percentage | 73.33% | 26.67% | 100.00% |

Democratic primary
| Town | Carter | Jackson | Bayh | Udall | Total |
|---|---|---|---|---|---|
| Dixville Notch | 6 | 1 | 1 | 1 | 9 |
| Percentage | 66.67% | 11.11% | 11.11% | 11.11% | 100.00% |

== 1980 ==
During the 1980 presidential campaign, former CIA director George H. W. Bush visited Dixville Notch. President Jimmy Carter won the Democratic primary and former California Governor Ronald Reagan was initially declared the winner of the Republican primary with six votes, but it was discovered that a vote for Senator Howard Baker was accidentally given to Reagan changing the vote to a tie between Reagan and Bush.

Republican primary
| Town | Reagan | Bush | Baker | Connally | Anderson | Crane | Total |
|---|---|---|---|---|---|---|---|
| Dixville Notch | 5 | 5 | 4 | 1 | 1 | 1 | 17 |
| Percentage | 29.41% | 29.41% | 23.53% | 5.88% | 5.88% | 5.88% | 100.00% |

Democratic primary
| Town | Carter | Kennedy | Brown | Total |
|---|---|---|---|---|
| Dixville Notch | 3 | 2 | 1 | 6 |
| Percentage | 50.00% | 33.33% | 16.67% | 100.00% |

== 1984 ==
During the 1984 presidential campaign Senator Fritz Hollings and former Florida Governor Reubin Askew were the only major party presidential candidates to visit Dixville Notch. Hollings met with the town's four registered Democrats and four independents on February 19, 1984, while former Vice President Walter Mondale and Senator Gary Hart personally made phone calls to the area. Hollings won the Democratic midnight vote and President Ronald Reagan won the Republican, with the remaining by Republican votes being write-ins for Hollings.

Republican primary
| Town | Reagan | Hollings | Total |
|---|---|---|---|
| Dixville Notch | 15 | 5 | 20 |
| Percentage | 75.00% | 25.00% | 100.00% |

Democratic primary
| Town | Hollings | Mondale | Hart | Askew | Total |
|---|---|---|---|---|---|
| Dixville Notch | 3 | 2 | 1 | 1 | 7 |
| Percentage | 42.86% | 28.57% | 14.29% | 14.29% | 100.00% |

== 1988 ==
During the 1988 presidential campaign Senator Paul Laxalt, former Secretary of State Alexander Haig, and Representative Dick Gephardt visited Dixville Notch, while former Governor Meldrim Thomson Jr. campaigned for Pat Robertson in the area. Haig announced his campaign on March 24, 1987, in New York and then traveled to Dixville Notch later in the day after opening his headquarters in New Hampshire. Gephardt narrowly won the town with four of its seven votes while Vice President George H. W. Bush received eleven out of twenty-seven votes in their respective primaries.

Republican primary
| Town | Bush | Dole | Kemp | du Pont | Haig | Robertson | Total |
|---|---|---|---|---|---|---|---|
| Dixville Notch | 11 | 6 | 5 | 2 | 2 | 1 | 27 |
| Percentage | 40.74% | 22.22% | 18.52% | 7.41% | 7.41% | 3.70% | 100.00% |

Democratic primary
| Town | Gephardt | Simon | Total |
|---|---|---|---|
| Dixville Notch | 4 | 3 | 7 |
| Percentage | 57.14% | 42.86% | 100.00% |

== 1992 ==
During the 1992 presidential campaign Pat Buchanan, Andre Marrou, and Ralph Nader visited Dixville Notch, while Vice President Dan Quayle and Bonnie Newman, chief of operations for Chief of Staff John H. Sununu, campaigned for President Bush, and members of Bob Kerrey's campaign made calls to residents of Dixville Notch. Governor Bill Clinton won the Democratic primary, Bush won the Republican primary, and Marrou, as the only Libertarian, won the Libertarian primary.

Republican primary
| Town | Bush | Buchanan | Nader | Marrou | Tsongas | Total |
|---|---|---|---|---|---|---|
| Dixville Notch | 9 | 3 | 3 | 1 | 1 | 17 |
| Percentage | 52.94% | 17.65% | 17.65% | 5.88% | 5.88% | 100.00% |

Democratic primary
| Town | Clinton | Tsongas | Total |
|---|---|---|---|
| Dixville Notch | 3 | 1 | 4 |
| Percentage | 75.00% | 25.00% | 100.00% |

Libertarian primary
| Town | Marrou | Total |
|---|---|---|
| Dixville Notch | 10 | 10 |
| Percentage | 100.00% | 100.00% |

== 1996 ==
During the 1996 presidential campaign, Senator Bob Dole and his wife Elizabeth Dole visited the area in August, 1995 and Pat Buchanan and Morry Taylor later visited the area. Dole narrowly won the Republican primary while President Bill Clinton received unanimous support marking the first time since 1980 that the winner of the midnight voting communities also won statewide although Clinton faced no serious opposition.

Republican primary
| Town | Dole | Alexander | Buchanan | Forbes | Lugar | Gramm | Powell | Total |
|---|---|---|---|---|---|---|---|---|
| Dixville Notch | 11 | 5 | 2 | 1 | 1 | 0 | 0 | 20 |
| Hart's Location | 3 | 8 | 3 | 3 | 0 | 1 | 1 | 19 |
| Vote totals | 14 | 13 | 5 | 4 | 1 | 1 | 1 | 39 |
| Percentage | 35.90% | 33.33% | 12.82% | 10.26% | 2.56% | 2.56% | 2.56% | 100.00% |

Democratic primary
| Town | Clinton | Total |
|---|---|---|
| Dixville Notch | 5 | 5 |
| Hart's Location | 7 | 7 |
| Vote totals | 12 | 12 |
| Percentage | 100.00% | 100.00% |

== 2000 ==
During the 2000 presidential campaign, Texas Governor George W. Bush and Senator John McCain visited Dixville Notch. This was the last time that Neil Tillotson voted first in the Dixville Notch midnight vote before his death in 2001. In the Republican primary Bush won Dixville Notch while McCain won Hart's Location and in the Democratic primary Senator Bill Bradley won both towns. In the general election Bush won both towns against Vice President Al Gore.

Republican primary
| Town | McCain | Bush | Forbes | Jeffrey Peters | Total |
|---|---|---|---|---|---|
| Dixville Notch | 10 | 12 | 1 | 0 | 23 |
| Hart's Location | 9 | 5 | 0 | 1 | 15 |
| Vote totals | 19 | 17 | 1 | 1 | 38 |
| Percentage | 50.00% | 44.74% | 2.63% | 2.63% | 100.00% |

Democratic primary
| Town | Bradley | Gore | Total |
|---|---|---|---|
| Dixville Notch | 9 | 3 | 12 |
| Hart's Location | 4 | 2 | 6 |
| Vote totals | 13 | 5 | 18 |
| Percentage | 72.22% | 27.78% | 100.00% |

General Election
| Town | Bush/Cheney | Gore/Lieberman | Nader/LaDuke | Total |
|---|---|---|---|---|
| Dixville Notch | 21 | 5 | 1 | 27 |
| Vote totals | 21 | 5 | 1 | 27 |
| Percentage | 77.78% | 18.52% | 3.70% | 100.00% |

== 2004 ==
During the 2004 presidential campaign, General Wesley Clark was the only major party presidential candidate to visit the area. President George W. Bush won the Republican primaries with unanimous support while in the Democratic primary Clark won both towns.

Republican primary
| Town | Bush | Total |
|---|---|---|
| Dixville Notch | 11 | 11 |
| Hart's Location | 13 | 13 |
| Vote totals | 24 | 24 |
| Percentage | 100.00% | 100.00% |

Democratic primary
| Town | Clark | Kerry | Dean | Edwards | Lieberman | Total |
|---|---|---|---|---|---|---|
| Dixville Notch | 8 | 4 | 2 | 1 | 1 | 16 |
| Hart's Location | 6 | 5 | 2 | 3 | 0 | 17 |
| Vote totals | 14 | 9 | 4 | 4 | 1 | 33 |
| Percentage | 42.42% | 27.27% | 12.12% | 12.12% | 3.03% | 100.00% |

== 2008 ==
During the 2008 presidential campaign, former New York City Mayor Rudy Giuliani visited Dixville Notch. Senator John McCain won both towns in the Republican primary and Senator Barack Obama won both towns in the Democratic primary.

Republican primary
| Town | McCain | Huckabee | Paul | Romney | Giuliani | Total |
|---|---|---|---|---|---|---|
| Dixville Notch | 4 | 0 | 0 | 2 | 1 | 7 |
| Hart's Location | 6 | 5 | 4 | 1 | 0 | 17 |
| Vote totals | 10 | 5 | 4 | 3 | 1 | 24 |
| Percentage | 41.67% | 20.83% | 16.67% | 12.50% | 4.17% | 100.00% |

Democratic primary
| Town | Obama | Clinton | Edwards | Richardson | Total |
|---|---|---|---|---|---|
| Dixville Notch | 7 | 0 | 2 | 1 | 10 |
| Hart's Location | 9 | 3 | 1 | 0 | 13 |
| Vote totals | 16 | 3 | 3 | 1 | 23 |
| Percentage | 69.57% | 13.04% | 13.04% | 4.35% | 100.00% |

== 2016 ==
During the 2016 presidential campaign, Ohio Governor John Kasich was the only major party presidential candidate to visit Dixville Notch with the rally he held on January 16, 2016. He later won all three precincts and tied with Senator Ted Cruz and Donald Trump for total votes. Senator Bernie Sanders won two of the precincts and 60.71% of the total vote, becoming the first Democratic candidate to win both the midnight voting precincts with major opposition and the statewide vote since 1980.

Democratic primary
| Town | Sanders | Clinton | Greenstein | Total |
|---|---|---|---|---|
| Dixville Notch | 4 | 0 | 0 | 4 |
| Hart's Location | 12 | 7 | 2 | 21 |
| Millsfield | 1 | 2 | 0 | 3 |
| Vote totals | 17 | 9 | 2 | 28 |
| Percentage | 60.71% | 32.14% | 7.14% | 100.00% |

Republican primary
| Town | Kasich | Cruz | Trump | Bush | Christie | Rubio | Carson | Fiorina | Paul | Total |
|---|---|---|---|---|---|---|---|---|---|---|
| Dixville Notch | 3 | 0 | 2 | 0 | 0 | 0 | 0 | 0 | 0 | 5 |
| Hart's Location | 5 | 0 | 4 | 1 | 2 | 1 | 1 | 0 | 0 | 14 |
| Millsfield | 1 | 9 | 3 | 1 | 1 | 1 | 0 | 1 | 1 | 18 |
| Vote totals | 9 | 9 | 9 | 6 | 3 | 2 | 1 | 1 | 1 | 37 |
| Percentage | 24.32% | 24.32% | 24.32% | 8.11% | 16.22% | 5.41% | 2.70% | 2.70% | 2.70% | 100.00% |

== 2020 ==
During the 2020 presidential campaign, Senator Michael Bennet was the only major party presidential candidate to visit Dixville Notch before the primary, but received zero votes from all three precincts. Michael Bloomberg won both the Republican and Democratic primary in Dixville Notch as a write-in candidate, while Senator Amy Klobuchar and President Donald Trump won the other two towns in their respective primaries. In the three towns, Klobuchar won a plurality with eight votes for 29.63% of the total vote.

Due to the COVID-19 pandemic during the general election, Hart's Location delayed its traditional midnight voting to the daylight hours. Dixville Notch's population briefly fell below the minimum of five residents required to hold an election in 2019, but Les Otten moved his official residence to the community to ensure that the midnight voting tradition could continue.

Democratic primary
| Town | Klobuchar | Sanders | Warren | Yang | Biden | Bloomberg | Buttigieg | Gabbard | Steyer | Total |
|---|---|---|---|---|---|---|---|---|---|---|
| Dixville Notch | 0 | 1 | 0 | 0 | 0 | 2 | 1 | 0 | 0 | 4 |
| Hart's Location | 6 | 2 | 4 | 3 | 1 | 0 | 0 | 1 | 1 | 18 |
| Millsfield | 2 | 1 | 0 | 0 | 1 | 0 | 1 | 0 | 0 | 5 |
| Vote totals | 8 | 4 | 4 | 3 | 2 | 2 | 2 | 1 | 1 | 27 |
| Percentage | 29.63% | 14.81% | 14.81% | 11.11% | 7.41% | 7.41% | 7.41% | 3.70% | 3.70% | 100.00% |

Republican primary
| Town | Trump | Weld | Bloomberg | Maxwell | Total |
|---|---|---|---|---|---|
| Dixville Notch | 0 | 0 | 1 | 0 | 1 |
| Hart's Location | 15 | 4 | 0 | 1 | 20 |
| Millsfield | 16 | 1 | 0 | 0 | 17 |
| Vote totals | 31 | 5 | 1 | 1 | 38 |
| Percentage | 81.58% | 13.16% | 2.63% | 2.63% | 100.00% |

General election
| Town | Trump/Pence | Biden/Harris | Jorgensen/Cohen | Total |
|---|---|---|---|---|
| Dixville Notch | 0 | 5 | 0 | 5 |
| Hart's Location | 20 | 23 | 0 | 43 |
| Millsfield | 16 | 5 | 0 | 21 |
| Vote totals | 36 | 33 | 0 | 69 |
| Percentage | 52.17% | 47.83% | 0% | 100.00% |

== 2024 ==
External videos
- Midnight primary voting results in New Hampshire: Live from Dixville Notch, WMUR-TV's official YouTube channel. January 23, 2024.
- See the moment the first results are announced in the 2024 presidential race, CNN's official YouTube channel. November 5, 2024.

Hart’s Location and Millsfield did not conduct a midnight vote, either in the primary or the general election. Only Dixville Notch conducted midnight voting in both cases.

During the 2024 presidential primaries, incumbent President Joe Biden was a write-in candidate due to the Democratic primary scheduling controversy. All six Dixville Notch voters unanimously voted for Republican Nikki Haley.

During the 2024 general election, the six Dixville Notch voters cast their ballots: three votes went to Donald Trump and three went to Kamala Harris.

== Accuracy ==
=== Primaries ===
Accuracy of midnight votes for Democratic Primary statewide winner
| Towns | 1972 | 1976 | 1980 | 1984 | 1988 | 1992 | 1996 | 2000 | 2004 | 2008 | 2016 | 2020 | 2024 |
|---|---|---|---|---|---|---|---|---|---|---|---|---|---|
| Dixville Notch | Yes | Yes | Yes | No | No | No | Yes | No | No | No | Yes | No | |
| Hart's Location | | | | | | | Yes | No | No | No | Yes | No | |
| Millsfield | | | | | | | | | | | No | No | |

Accuracy of midnight votes for Republican Primary statewide winner
| Towns | 1964 | 1968 | 1972 | 1976 | 1980 | 1984 | 1988 | 1992 | 1996 | 2000 | 2004 | 2008 | 2012 | 2016 | 2020 | 2024 |
|---|---|---|---|---|---|---|---|---|---|---|---|---|---|---|---|---|
| Dixville Notch | Yes | Yes | Yes | Yes | Yes | Yes | Yes | Yes | No | No | Yes | Yes | Yes | No | No | No |
| Hart's Location | Yes | | | | | | | | No | Yes | No | Yes | Yes | No | Yes | — |
| Millsfield | | | | | | | | | | | | | | No | Yes | — |

=== General election ===
Accuracy of midnight votes for general election statewide winner
| Towns | 1948 | 1952 | 1956 | 1960 | 1964 | 1968 | 1972 | 1976 | 1980 | 1984 | 1988 | 1992 | 1996 | 2000 | 2004 | 2008 | 2012 | 2016 | 2020 | 2024 |
|---|---|---|---|---|---|---|---|---|---|---|---|---|---|---|---|---|---|---|---|---|
| Dixville Notch | | | | Yes | No | No | Yes | Yes | Yes | Yes | Yes | No | No | Yes | No | Yes | Tie | Yes | Yes | Tie |
| Hart's Location | | | | | | | | | | | | | No | Yes | No | Yes | Yes | Yes | Yes | |
| Millsfield | | | | | | | | | | | | | | | | | | No | No | |

Accuracy of midnight votes for general election national winner
| Towns | 1948 | 1952 | 1956 | 1960 | 1964 | 1968 | 1972 | 1976 | 1980 | 1984 | 1988 | 1992 | 1996 | 2000 | 2004 | 2008 | 2012 | 2016 | 2020 | 2024 |
|---|---|---|---|---|---|---|---|---|---|---|---|---|---|---|---|---|---|---|---|---|
| Dixville Notch | | | | No | No | No | Yes | No | Yes | Yes | Yes | No | No | Yes | Yes | Yes | Tie | No | Yes | Tie |
| Hart's Location | | | | | | | | | | | | | No | Yes | Yes | Yes | Yes | No | Yes | |
| Millsfield | | | | | | | | | | | | | | | | | | Yes | No | |

== See also ==
- New Hampshire primary
- New Hampshire Historical Marker No. 171: Dixville Notch "First in the Nation"

== Works cited ==
- McDermott, Casey (October 2, 2019). "Unsung: Meet the Mother of New Hampshire's Midnight Voting Tradition". New Hampshire Public Radio. Archived from the original on March 29, 2025.
