= 2020 New Hampshire Democratic presidential primary =

- February 11, 2020

33 delegates (24 pledged, 9 unpledged) to the Democratic National Convention The number of pledged delegates won is determined by the popular vote

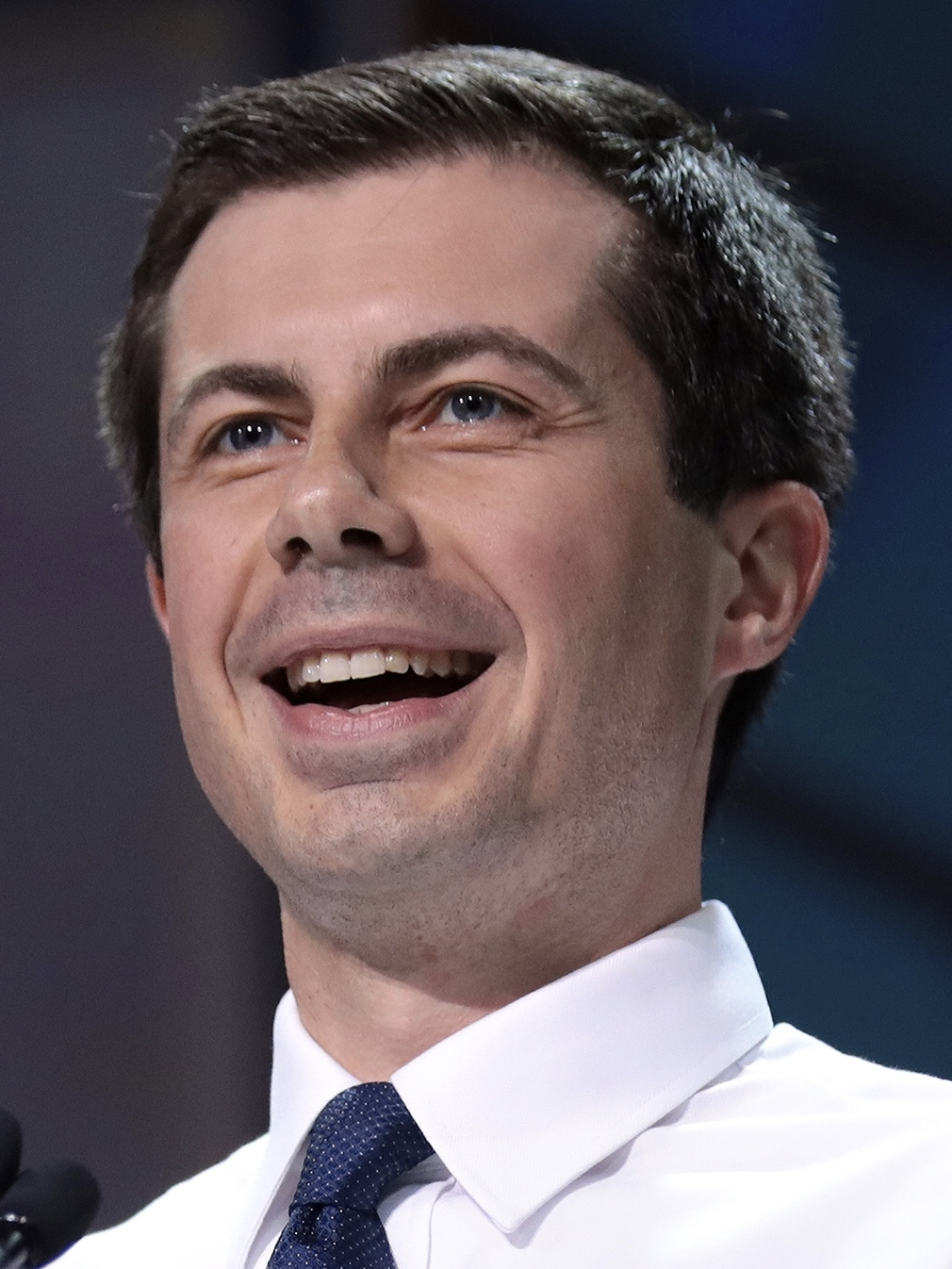

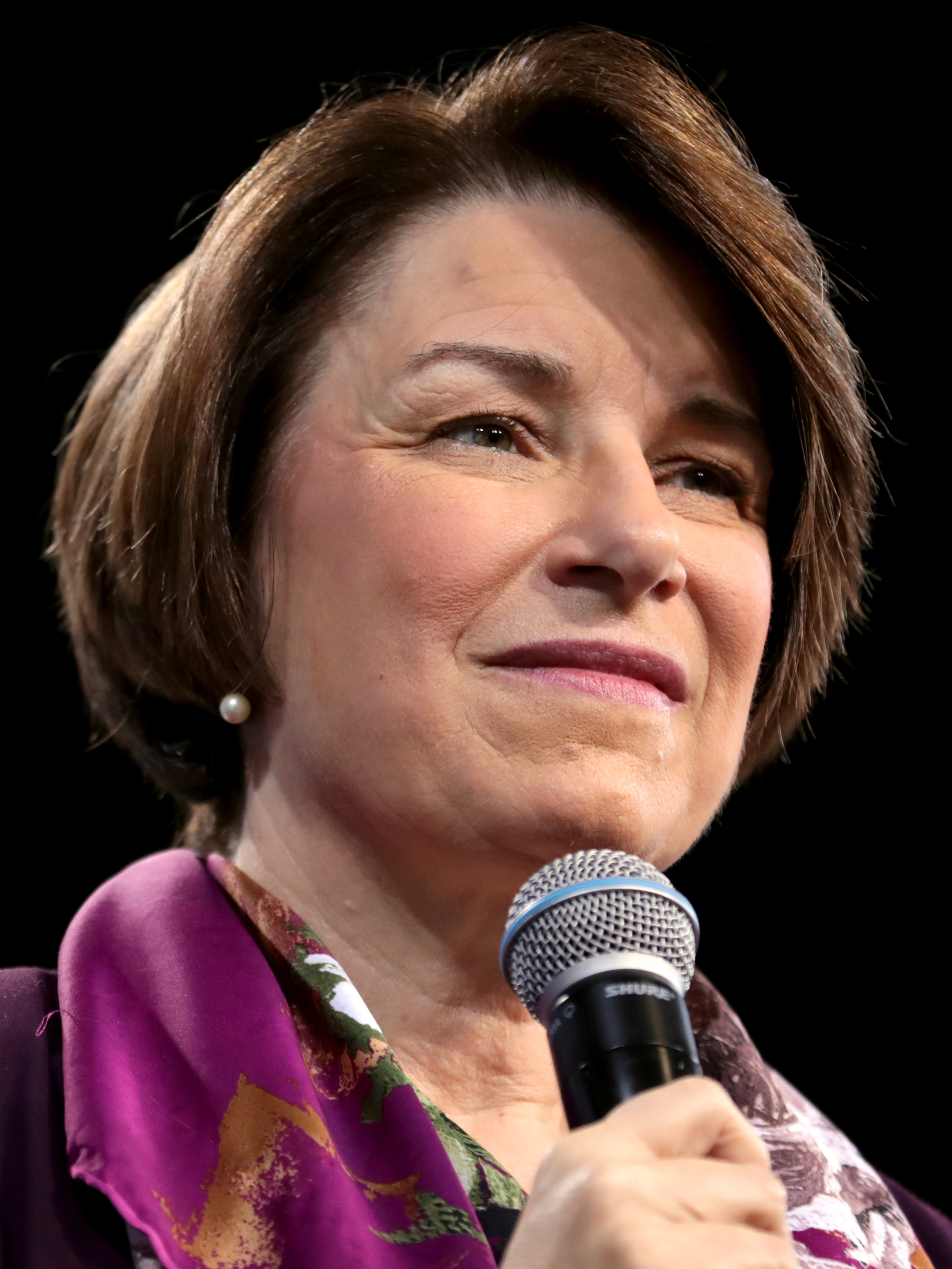

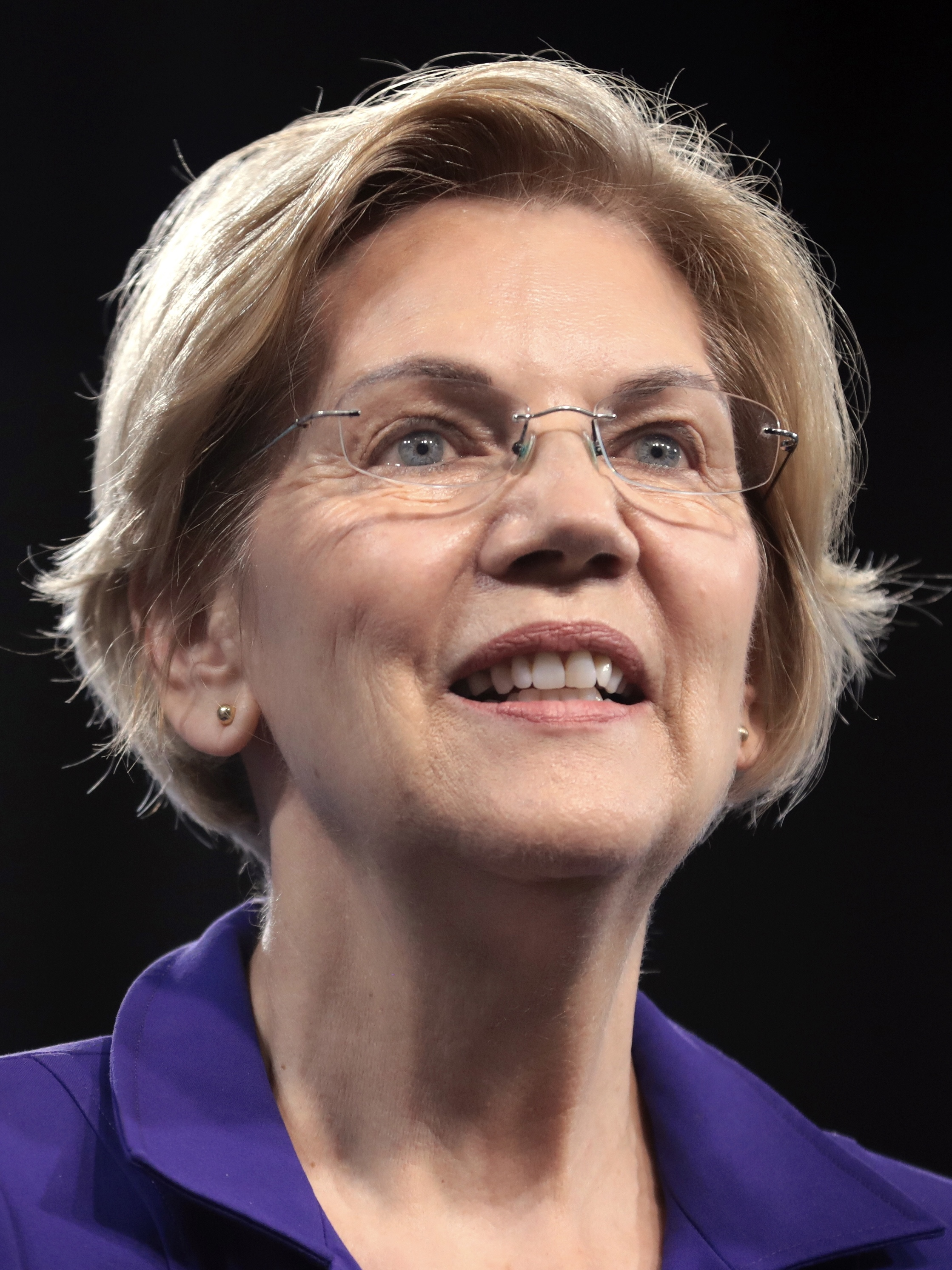

Candidate	Bernie Sanders	Pete Buttigieg	Amy Klobuchar
Home state	Vermont	Indiana	Minnesota
Delegate count	9	9	6
Popular vote	76,384	72,454	58,714
Percentage	25.60%	24.28%	19.68%
Candidate	Elizabeth Warren	Joe Biden
Home state	Massachusetts	Delaware
Delegate count	0	0
Popular vote	27,429	24,944
Percentage	9.19%	8.36%

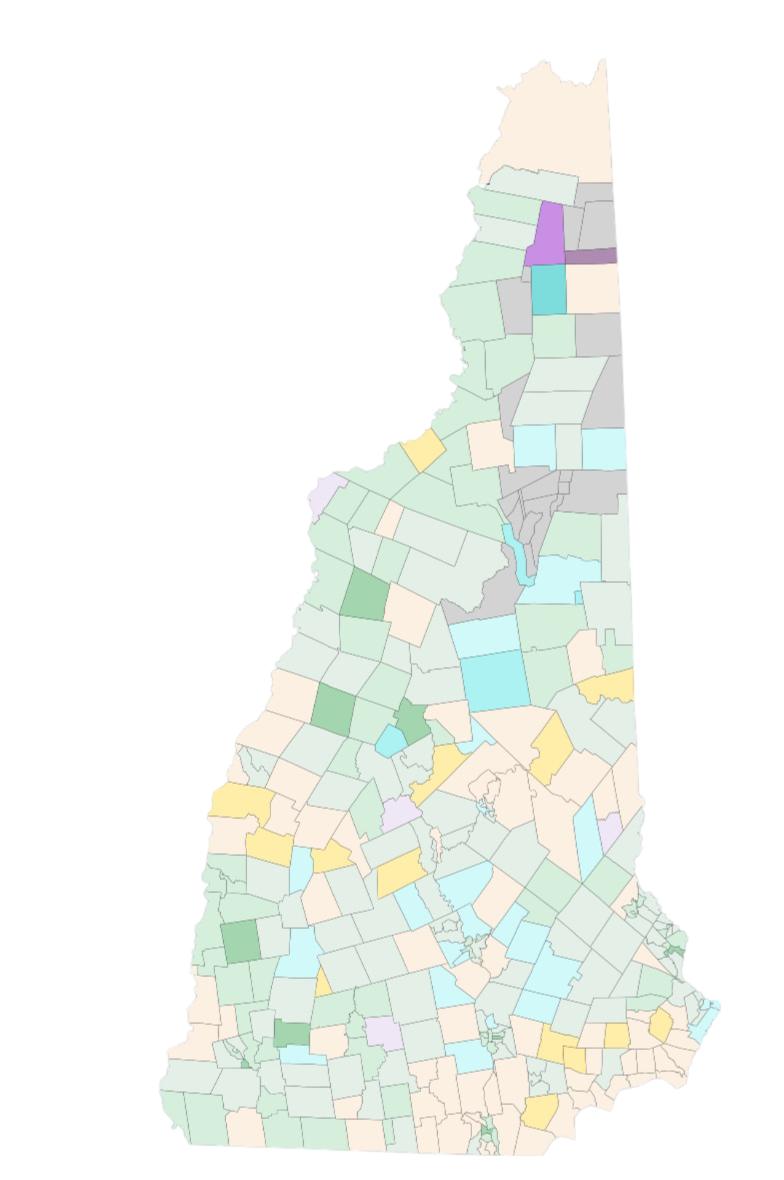
Bloomberg
50–60% (write-in)
Buttigieg
20–30%
30–40%
40–50%
Klobuchar
20–30%
30–40%
40–50%
Sanders
20–30%
30–40%
40–50%
Other
20–30% tie
30–40% tie
40–50% tie
50% tie
N/A

The 2020 New Hampshire Democratic presidential primary took place on February 11, 2020, as the second nominating contest in the Democratic Party primaries for the 2020 presidential election, following the Iowa caucuses the week before. The New Hampshire primary was a semi-closed primary, meaning that only Democrats and independents were allowed to vote in this primary. New Hampshire sent 33 delegates to the national convention, of which 24 were pledged delegates allocated on the basis of the results of the primary, and the other 9 were unpledged delegates preselected independently of the primary results.

Senator Bernie Sanders won the primary with 25.6% of the vote, edging out former mayor Pete Buttigieg after his narrow win in Iowa, who came in second place with 24.3% of the vote. Both had already led the results in Iowa. This was a decline in support for Sanders, who in 2016 had won New Hampshire with 60.14% to Hillary Clinton's 37.68%. Both Sanders and Buttigieg received nine delegates, while Senator Amy Klobuchar unexpectedly finished in third place and received six delegates; her third-place finish was described as "Klomentum" or "Klobucharge" by several observers, but she was not able to make use of this in the following primaries. Senator Elizabeth Warren and former vice president Joe Biden, who had been the leading contenders nationally, both underperformed expectations, coming in fourth and fifth, respectively, and received no delegates. Entrepreneur Andrew Yang, former Massachusetts Governor Deval Patrick and Colorado Senator Michael Bennet finished eighth, tenth and eleventh respectively and all suspended their presidential campaigns after their poor results.

Voter turnout set a new record for New Hampshire primaries, with 298,377 ballots being cast, breaking the previous record of 287,527 set in the 2008 primary. This was the third consecutive contested Democratic primary in which New Hampshire voted for the candidate that did not receive the Democratic nomination. Despite underperforming quite drastically in this primary, Biden later went on to win the nomination and defeat incumbent president Donald Trump in the general election, including a comfortable general election victory in New Hampshire.

== Procedure ==
The state's ballot access laws have traditionally been lenient, with prospective presidential candidates required to pay only a $1,000 fee to secure a line on the primary ballot. Primary elections were held on Tuesday, February 11, 2020. The first polls opened at midnight local time (EST), with the vast majority of polling places closed by 7 p.m. and a small number of cities allowed to close at 8 p.m.

In the semi-closed primary, candidates had to meet a viability threshold of 15 percent at the congressional district or statewide level in order to be considered viable. The 24 pledged delegates to the 2020 Democratic National Convention were all allocated proportionally on the basis of the qualified results of the primary, in the two congressional districts and on statewide level respectively. Of these, 8 each were allocated to each of the state's 2 congressional districts and another 3 were allocated to party leaders and elected officials (PLEO delegates), in addition to 5 at-large delegates. The national convention delegation meeting was to be held in Concord on April 25, to vote on the exact names of the five at-large and three pledged PLEO delegates for the Democratic National Convention. The delegation also included 9 unpledged PLEO delegates (also known as superdelegates): 5 members of the Democratic National Committee and 4 members of Congress (both senators and 2 representatives).

Pledged national convention delegates
Type	Del.
CD1 (Note: Each 1st congressional district (CD1) delegate is pledged to support a specific presidential candidate as determined per the total qualified popular vote result of the primary held only in CD1 on February 11.)	8
CD2 (Note: Each 2nd congressional district (CD2) delegate is pledged to support a specific presidential candidate as determined per the total qualified popular vote result of the primary held only in CD2 on February 11.)	8
PLEO (Note: Each PLEO delegate is pledged to support a specific presidential candidate as determined per the statewide qualified popular vote result of the primary held on February 11, but the exact name of the PLEO delegate will only be elected among the participating PLEO delegates at the "New Hampshire national convention delegation meeting" on April 25.)	3
At-large (Note: Each at-large delegate is pledged to support a specific presidential candidate as determined per the statewide qualified popular vote result of the primary held on February 11, but the exact name of the at-large delegate will only be elected among the participating delegates at the "New Hampshire national convention delegation meeting" on April 25.)	5
Total pledged delegates	24

=== Candidates on the ballot ===
The following candidates were on the ballot and are listed in order of filing.

Running

- Mark Stewart Greenstein, Connecticut
- Pete Buttigieg, Indiana
- Thomas James Torgesen, New York
- Henry Hewes, New York
- Bernie Sanders, Vermont
- David John Thistle, Massachusetts
- Michael A. Ellinger, California
- Tulsi Gabbard, Hawaii
- Tom Koos, California
- Amy Klobuchar, Minnesota
- Michael Bennet, Colorado
- Andrew Yang, New York
- Joe Biden, Delaware
- Steve Burke, New York
- Tom Steyer, California
- Roque "Rocky" De La Fuente III, California
- Robby Wells, Georgia
- Elizabeth Warren, Massachusetts
- Lorenz Kraus, New York
- Raymond Michael Moroz, New York
- Deval Patrick, Massachusetts
- Sam Sloan, New York
- Rita Krichevsky, New Jersey
- Mosie Boyd, Arkansas
- Jason Evritte Dunlap, Maryland

Withdrawn

- Marianne Williamson, California
- John Delaney, Maryland
- Kamala Harris, California
- Steve Bullock, Montana
- Julian Castro, Texas
- Joe Sestak, Pennsylvania
- Ben Gleib, California
- Cory Booker, New Jersey

Brian Moore qualified but withdrew early enough so that he did not appear on the ballot.

== Forums and other events ==
Prospective candidates began making visits to New Hampshire in 2017. Among the more notable events of the campaign was the 2019 state convention, at which 19 of the candidates give speeches. The eighth Democratic primary debate took place in the state on February 7, 2020. A Lesser-Known Candidates Forum was also held, featuring candidates on the New Hampshire ballot but who were not considered major candidates.

== Polling ==
Polling aggregation
Source of poll aggregation	Date updated	Dates polled	Bernie Sanders	Pete Buttigieg	Elizabeth Warren	Joe Biden	Amy Klobuchar	Andrew Yang	Tulsi Gabbard	Tom Steyer	Other	Un- decided (Note: Calculated by taking the difference of 100% and all other candidates combined)
270 to Win	Feb 10, 2020	Feb 4–9, 2020	27.3%	20.9%	13.1%	12.3%	10.3%	3.0%	2.7%	2.1%	1.9% (Note: Patrick with 0.8%; Bennet with 0.6%; Bloomberg with 0.5%)	6.4%
RealClear Politics	Feb 10, 2020	Feb 6–9, 2020	28.7%	21.3%	11.0%	11.0%	11.7%	3.7%	3.3%	1.7%	1.3% (Note: Patrick with 1.0%; Bennet with 0.3%; Bloomberg not reported)	6.3%
FiveThirtyEight	Feb 10, 2020	until Feb 10, 2020 (Note: FiveThirtyEight aggregates polls with a trendline regression of polls rather than a strict average of recent polls.)	26.0%	21.6%	12.5%	11.7%	10.3%	3.0%	2.9%	2.6%	3.5% (Note: Bloomberg with 2.3%; Patrick with 0.7%; Bennet with 0.5%)	5.8%
Average			27.3%	21.3%	12.2%	11.7%	10.8%	3.2%	3.0%	2.1%	2.2% (Note: Bloomberg with 0.9%; Patrick with 0.8%; Bennet with 0.5%)	6.2%
New Hampshire primary results (February 11, 2020)			25.6%	24.3%	9.2%	8.4%	19.7%	2.8%	3.3%	3.6%	2.7% (Note: Patrick with 0.4%; Bennet with 0.3%; Booker with 0.1%; Boyd, Burke, Bullock, Castro, De La Fuente III, Delaney, Dunlap, Ellinger, Gleib, Greenstein, Harris, Hewes, Koos, Kraus, Krichevsky, Moroz, Sloan, Sestak, Thistle, Torgesen, Wells and Williamson with 0.0%; other (write-in candidates) with 1.5%)	–

– Debate qualifying poll as designated by the Democratic National Committee

Polling from January 1, 2020, to February 11, 2020
Poll source	Date(s) administered	Sample size (Note: Key: A – all adults RV – registered voters LV – likely voters V – unclear)	Margin of error	Joe Biden	Pete Buttigieg	Tulsi Gabbard	Amy Klobuchar	Bernie Sanders	Tom Steyer	Elizabeth Warren	Andrew Yang	Other	Undecided
New Hampshire primary (popular vote)	Feb 11, 2020	–	–	8.4%	24.3%	3.3%	19.7%	25.6%	3.6%	9.2%	2.8%	2.7% (Note: Patrick with 0.4%; Bennet with 0.3%; Booker with 0.1%; Boyd, Burke, Bullock, Castro, De La Fuente III, Delaney, Dunlap, Ellinger, Gleib, Greenstein, Harris, Hewes, Koos, Kraus, Krichevsky, Moroz, Sloan, Sestak, Thistle, Torgesen, Wells and Williamson; other (write-in candidates) with 1.5%)	–
AtlasIntel	Feb 8–10, 2020	431 (LV)	± 5.0%	12%	24%	3%	14%	24%	1%	11%	5%	–	6%
Data For Progress (Note: By the time of this poll, Data for Progress, which has worked with both the Sanders and Warren campaigns, had endorsed Warren)	Feb 7–10, 2020	1296 (LV)	± 2.7%	9%	26%	3%	13%	28%	3%	14%	5%	–	–
American Research Group	Feb 8–9, 2020	400 (LV)	–	13%	20%	3%	13%	28%	2%	11%	3%	5% (Note: Bennet, Bloomberg and Patrick with 1%; other with 2%)	2%
Emerson College/WHDH	Feb 8–9, 2020	500 (LV)	± 4.3%	10%	23%	2%	14%	30%	2%	11%	4%	4% (Note: Bennet and Patrick with 1%; "someone else" with 2%)	–
Change Research	Feb 8–9, 2020	662 (LV)	± 3.8%	9%	21%	6%	8%	30%	3%	8%	5%	1% (Note: Patrick with 1%; Bennet with 0%)	9%
Suffolk University/Boston Globe/WBZ-TV	Feb 8–9, 2020	500 (LV)	± 4.4%	12%	19%	3%	14%	27%	2%	12%	3%	3% (Note: Patrick with 1%; Bennet with 0%; other with 2%; refused with 0%)	7%
Elucd	Feb 7–9, 2020	492 (LV)	± 4.4%	8%	20%	– (Note: Not yet released)	12%	26%	– (Note: Not yet released)	10%	– (Note: Not yet released)	– (Note: Not yet released)	15%
University of New Hampshire/CNN	Feb 6–9, 2020	365 (LV)	± 5.1%	11%	22%	5%	7%	29%	1%	10%	4%	1% (Note: Bennet and Bloomberg with 0%; Patrick with no voters; other with 1%)	10%
Emerson College/WHDH	Feb 7–8, 2020	500 (LV)	± 4.3%	11%	20%	3%	13%	30%	2%	12%	4%	4% (Note: Patrick with 1%; Bennet with 0%; "someone else" with 3%)	–
Suffolk University/Boston Globe/WBZ-TV	Feb 7–8, 2020	500 (LV)	± 4.4%	10%	22%	2%	9%	24%	2%	13%	3%	3% (Note: Bennet and Patrick with 0%; "Other" with 3%)	12%
Boston Herald/FPU/NBC10	Feb 5–8, 2020	512 (LV)	–	14%	20%	0%	6%	23%	2%	16%	3%	3% (Note: Bennet with 1%; Patrick with no voters; other with 2%)	13%
YouGov/CBS News	Feb 5–8, 2020	848 (LV)	± 4.3%	12%	25%	2%	10%	29%	1%	17%	1%	3% (Note: Patrick with 1%; Bennet with 0%; "someone else" with 2%)	–
University of New Hampshire/CNN	Feb 5–8, 2020	384 (LV)	± 5.0%	12%	21%	5%	6%	28%	2%	9%	4%	2% (Note: Bloomberg with 1%; others with 1%)	11%
Emerson College/WHDH	Feb 6–7, 2020	500 (LV)	± 4.3%	11%	24%	5%	9%	31%	2%	11%	3%	3% (Note: Patrick and Bennet with 0%; "someone else" with 3%)	–
Suffolk University/Boston Globe/WBZ-TV	Feb 6–7, 2020	500 (LV)	± 4.4%	11%	25%	2%	6%	24%	2%	14%	3%	4% (Note: Bennet with 1%; Patrick with 0%; "Other" with 3%)	9%
University of Massachusetts Lowell	Feb 4–7, 2020	440 (LV)	± 6.5%	14%	17%	4%	8%	25%	5%	15%	3%	5% (Note: Bennet and Patrick with 1%; "another candidate" with 3%)	4%
University of New Hampshire/CNN	Feb 4–7, 2020	365 (LV)	± 5.1%	11%	21%	6%	5%	28%	3%	9%	3%	3% (Note: Bloomberg with 2%; Patrick and Bennet with 0%; "Other" with 1%)	11%
Emerson College/WHDH	Feb 5–6, 2020	500 (LV)	± 4.3%	11%	23%	6%	9%	32%	2%	13%	2%	3% (Note: Patrick and Bennet with 0%; "someone else" with 3%)	–
Suffolk University/Boston Globe/WBZ-TV	Feb 5–6, 2020	500 (LV)	± 4.4%	11%	23%	4%	6%	24%	3%	13%	3%	4% (Note: Bennet and Patrick with 1%; "Other" with 2%)	12%
Marist/NBC News	Feb 4–6, 2020	709 (LV)	± 4.7%	13%	21%	3%	8%	25%	4%	14%	4%	3% (Note: Patrick and Bennet with 1%; "Other" with 1%)	5%
Suffolk University/Boston Globe/WBZ-TV	Feb 4–5, 2020	500 (LV)	± 4.4%	12%	19%	5%	6%	25%	4%	11%	2%	1% (Note: Bennet and Patrick with 0%; "Other" with 1%)	15%
Monmouth University	Feb 3–5, 2020	503 (LV)	± 4.4%	17%	20%	4%	9%	24%	3%	13%	4%	2% (Note: Bennet with 1%; Patrick with <1%; "Other" with 1%)	5%
Monmouth University	Feb 3–5, 2020	503 (LV)	± 4.4%	17% (Note: If the primary came down to the five candidates listed in this poll)	22%	–	13%	27%	–	13%	–	3% (Note: "None of these/won't vote" with 3%)	4%
Monmouth University	Feb 3–5, 2020	503 (LV)	± 4.4%	19% (Note: If the primary came down to the four candidates listed in this poll)	28%	–	–	28%	–	16%	–	3% (Note: "None of these/won't vote" with 3%)	5%
Emerson College/WHDH	Feb 3–5, 2020	500 (LV)	± 4.3%	12%	21%	5%	11%	31%	1%	12%	4%	2% (Note: Patrick and Bennet with 0%; "someone else" with 2%)	–
Suffolk University/Boston Globe/WBZ-TV	Feb 3–4, 2020	500 (LV)	± 4.4%	15%	15%	5%	6%	24%	5%	10%	3%	1% (Note: Bennet and Patrick with 0%; "Other" with 1%)	14%
Emerson College/WHDH	Feb 2–4, 2020	500 (LV)	± 4.3%	13%	17%	6%	11%	32%	2%	11%	6%	3% (Note: Patrick with 1%; Bennet with 0%; "someone else" with 2%)	–
	Feb 3, 2020	Iowa caucuses											
Suffolk University/Boston Globe/WBZ-TV	Feb 2–3, 2020	500 (LV)	± 4.4%	18%	11%	5%	6%	24%	4%	13%	3%	3% (Note: Bennet and Patrick with 1%; "Other" with 1%)	14%
Emerson College/WHDH	Feb 1–3, 2020	500 (LV)	± 4.3%	13%	12%	4%	12%	32%	5%	13%	5%	4% (Note: Bennet and Patrick with 0%; "someone else" with 4%)	–
Emerson College/WHDH	Jan 31 – Feb 2, 2020	500 (LV)	± 4.3%	14%	13%	7%	8%	29%	8%	12%	7%	2% (Note: Bennet and Patrick with 0%; "someone else" with 2%)	–
Saint Anselm College	Jan 29 – Feb 2, 2020	491 (LV)	± 4.4%	19%	14%	3%	11%	19%	5%	11%	4%	2% (Note: Bloomberg with 2%; Bennet and Patrick with <1%)	11%
Boston Herald/FPU/NBC10	Jan 29 – Feb 1, 2020	454 (LV)	± 4.6%	24%	8%	3%	4%	31%	No voters	17%	1%	5% (Note: Bloomberg with 2%; Bennet with 1%; Patrick with no voters; other with 2%)	7%
University of Massachusetts Lowell	Jan 28–31, 2020	400 (LV)	± 6.4%	22%	12%	5%	6%	23%	6%	19%	2%	1% (Note: Patrick with 1%; Bennet and Delaney with 0%)	4%
YouGov/UMass Amherst/WCVB	Jan 17–29, 2020	500 (LV)	± 5.3%	20%	12%	5%	5%	25%	5%	17%	4%	2% (Note: Bennet, Delaney, and Patrick with 0%; "Other" with 2%)	3%
American Research Group	Jan 24–27, 2020	600 (LV)	± 4%	13%	12%	8%	7%	28%	2%	11%	5%	8% (Note: Bloomberg (explicitly as a write in) and Patrick with 2%; Bennet with 1%; "Other" with 3%; Delaney not reported)	6%
Boston Herald/FPU/NBC10	Jan 23–26, 2020	407 (LV)	± 4.9%	22%	10%	3%	5%	29%	0%	16%	1%	7% (Note: Bloomberg with 3%; Bennet with 2%; Delaney and Patrick with 0%; "Other" with 2%)	9%
Marist/NBC News	Jan 20–23, 2020	697 (LV)	± 4.5%	15%	17%	6%	10%	22%	3%	13%	5%	2% (Note: Bennet and Patrick with 1%; Delaney with <1%)	7%
University of New Hampshire/CNN	Jan 15–23, 2020	516 (LV)	± 4.3%	16%	15%	5%	6%	25%	2%	12%	5%	2% (Note: Bloomberg and Delaney with 1%; Bennet and Patrick with 0%)	10%
MassINC Polling Group/WBUR	Jan 17–21, 2020	426 (LV)	± 4.8%	14%	17%	5%	6%	29%	2%	13%	5%	4% (Note: Bloomberg and Patrick with 1%; Bennet with <1%; Delaney with 0%; some other candidate with 2%; would not vote with <1%)	5% (Note: Listed as "Don't know/refused")
Suffolk University/Boston Globe	Jan 15–19, 2020	500 (LV)	± 4.4%	15%	12%	5%	5%	16%	3%	10%	6%	3% (Note: Bennet and Patrick with 1%; Delaney with 0%)	24%
Emerson College/WHDH	Jan 13–16, 2020	657 (LV)	± 3.8%	14%	18%	5%	10%	23%	4%	14%	6%	7% (Note: Delaney with 1%; Bennet and Patrick with no voters; "someone else" with 6%)	–
	Jan 13, 2020	Booker withdraws from the race											
Boston Herald/FPU/NBC10	Jan 8–12, 2020	434 (LV)	–	26%	7%	4%	2%	22%	2%	18%	2%	7% (Note: Bloomberg with 4%; Bennet, Delaney, Patrick and Williamson with no voters; other with 1%)	12%
Patinkin Research Strategies/Yang 2020 (Note: Sponsored by a presidential candidate's campaign)	Jan 5–7, 2020	600 (LV)	± 4%	21%	17%	7%	6%	19%	6%	10%	5%	3% (Note: Booker with 2%; "someone else" with 1%)	7%
Monmouth University	Jan 3–7, 2020	404 (LV)	± 4.9%	19%	20%	4%	6%	18%	4%	15%	3%	3% (Note: Bennet with 2%; Booker with 1%; Delaney and Williamson with 0%; Patrick and "Someone else" with 0%)	7%
Monmouth University	Jan 3–7, 2020	404 (LV)	± 4.9%	21% (Note: If the primary came down to the seven candidates listed in this poll)	20%	–	7%	21%	–	15%	5%	5% (Note: "None of these" with 3%; Booker with 2%)	8%
Monmouth University	Jan 3–7, 2020	404 (LV)	± 4.9%	24% (Note: If the primary came down to the four candidates listed in this poll)	23%	–	–	21%	–	18%	–	5% (Note: "None of these" with 5%)	8%
YouGov/CBS News	Dec 27, 2019 – Jan 3, 2020	487 (LV)	± 5.3%	25%	13%	1%	7%	27%	3%	18%	2%	3% (Note: Booker with 2%; Patrick with 1%; Bennet, Castro, Delaney, and Williamson with 0%; "Someone else" with 0%)	–

Polling before January 2020
Poll source	Date(s) administered	Sample size	Margin of error	Joe Biden	Cory Booker	Pete Buttigieg	Tulsi Gabbard	Kamala Harris	Amy Klobuchar	Beto O'Rourke	Deval Patrick	Bernie Sanders	Elizabeth Warren	Andrew Yang	Other	Undecided
MassINC Polling Group/WBUR	Dec 3–8, 2019	442 (LV)	± 4.7%	17%	1%	18%	5%	–	3%	–	<1%	15%	12%	5%	11% (Note: Steyer with 3%; Bloomberg with 2%; Williamson with 1%; Bennet with <1%; Castro and Delaney with 0%; someone else with 2%; would not vote with 3%)	12% (Note: Includes "refused")
	Dec 3, 2019	Harris withdraws from the race														
Emerson College	Nov 22–26, 2019	549 (LV)	± 4.1%	14%	2%	22%	6%	4%	2%	–	0%	26%	14%	5%	7% (Note: Steyer with 3%; Bloomberg and Williamson with 1%; Bennet, Bullock, Castro and Delaney and Sestak and with 0%; someone else with 2%)	–
Boston Globe/Suffolk University	Nov 21–24, 2019	500 (LV)	–	12%	2%	13%	6%	3%	1%	–	1%	16%	14%	4%	6% (Note: Steyer with 2%; Bullock, Castro and Delaney with 1%; Bennet, Sestak and Williamson with 0%; others with 2%; refused with 1%)	21%
Saint Anselm College	Nov 13–18, 2019	255 (RV)	± 6.1%	15%	3%	25%	3%	1%	6%	–	0%	9%	15%	2%	5% (Note: Steyer with 5%; Delaney and Williamson with 0%)	13%
	Nov 14, 2019	Patrick announces his candidacy														
YouGov/CBS News	Nov 6–13, 2019	535 (RV)	± 5%	22%	1%	16%	0%	3%	3%	–	–	20%	31%	1%	1% (Note: Steyer with 1%; Bennet, Bullock, Castro, Delaney, Messam, Sestak, Williamson with 0%, "Someone else" with 2%)	–
Quinnipiac University	Nov 6–10, 2019	1,134 (LV)	± 3.8	20%	1%	15%	6%	1%	3%	–	–	14%	16%	4%	5% (Note: Steyer with 3%; Bennet and Castro, with 1%, Bullock, Delaney, Messam, Sestak, Williamson with 0%)	14%
	Nov 1, 2019	O'Rourke withdraws from the race														
University of New Hampshire/CNN	Oct 21–27, 2019	574 (LV)	± 4.1%	15%	2%	10%	5%	3%	5%	2%	–	21%	18%	5%	4% (Note: Steyer with 3%; Sestak with 1%; Bennet, Castro, Delaney and other with 0%)	10%
Boston Herald/FPU	Oct 9–13, 2019	422 (LV)	± 4.8%	24%	2%	9%	1%	4%	2%	0%	–	22%	25%	1%	4% (Note: Steyer with 1%; Castro with 0% and Williamson with 0%; other with 3%)	7%
Firehouse Strategies/Øptimus	Oct 8–10, 2019	610 (LV)	± 3.7%	18%	2%	7%	– (Note: The poll did not announce this result separately; it is listed as part of 'Other'.)	2%	–	1%	–	9%	25%	2%	32%	–
YouGov/CBS News	Oct 3–11, 2019	506	± 5.4%	24%	1%	7%	2%	4%	2%	1%	–	17%	32%	5%	5% (Note: Steyer with 4%; Ryan with 1%, Bennet, Bullock, Castro, Delaney, Messam, Sestak, and Williamson with 0%; "someone else" with 0%)	–
Saint Anselm College	Sep 25–29, 2019	423	± 4.8%	24%	1%	10%	3%	5%	3%	<1%	–	11%	25%	2%	3% (Note: Steyer with 2%; "Other" with 1%; Castro with 0%; Delaney, Bullock, Bennet and Williamson with less than 1%)	9%
Monmouth University	Sep 17–21, 2019	401	± 4.9%	25%	2%	10%	2%	3%	2%	1%	–	12%	27%	2%	3% (Note: Steyer with 2%; Williamson with 1%; Castro, Delaney and Ryan with <1%; Bennet, de Blasio, Bullock, Messam and Sestak with 0%; "no one" with 1%;)	9%
HarrisX/No Labels	Sep 6–11, 2019	595	± 4.0%	22%	3%	5%	6%	5%	1%	1%	–	21%	15%	2%	5% (Note: Steyer with 2%; de Blasio, Delaney, and Williamson with 1%; Bennet, Bullock, Castro, Messam, Ryan and Sestak with 0%)	14%
Boston Herald/FPU	Sep 4–10, 2019	425	± 4.8%	21%	1%	5%	3%	6%	1%	2%	–	29%	17%	5%	2% (Note: Castro with 1%; others with 2%)	9%
Emerson College	Sep 6–9, 2019	483	± 4.4%	24%	4%	11%	6%	8%	1%	1%	–	13%	21%	3%	7% (Note: Delaney with 3%; Williamson with 1%; Bennet, Bullock, Castro, de Blasio, Messam, Ryan, and Sestak with 0%; someone else with 3%)	–
YouGov/CBS News	Aug 28 – Sep 4, 2019	526	± 5.2%	26%	2%	8%	1%	7%	1%	1%	–	25%	27%	1%	1% (Note: Steyer with 1%; Bennet, de Blasio, Bullock, Castro, Delaney, Messam, Ryan, Sestak, and Williamson with 0%)	–
Gravis Marketing	Aug 2–6, 2019	250	± 6.2%	15%	0%	8%	5%	7%	4%	2%	–	21%	12%	4%	8% (Note: Steyer with 4%; Castro with 2%; Gillibrand and Inslee with 1%)	11%
Suffolk University	Aug 1–4, 2019	500	± 4.4%	21%	1%	6%	3%	8%	1%	0%	–	17%	14%	1%	6% (Note: Bennet with 2%; Delaney, Gillibrand, Williamson, and Steyer with 1%; others with 0%)	21%
Firehouse Strategies/Øptimus	Jul 23–25, 2019	587	± 3.3%	21%	1%	8%	–	13%	–	0%	–	13%	16%	1%	7%	19%
YouGov/CBS News	Jul 9–18, 2019	530	± 5%	27%	1%	7%	2%	12%	1%	2%	–	20%	18%	1%	5% (Note: Castro, Delaney, Gillibrand, Hickenlooper, and Steyer with 1%; Bennet, Bullock, de Blasio, Gravel, Inslee, Messam, Moulton, Ryan, Sestak, and Williamson with 0%)	–
University of New Hampshire/CNN	Jul 8–15, 2019	386	± 5.0%	24%	2%	10%	1%	9%	0%	2%	–	19%	19%	1%	4% (Note: Bennet, Delaney, Gillibrand, and Williamson with 1%; de Blasio, Inslee, Moulton, Ryan, and Steyer with 0%)	9%
Saint Anselm College	Jul 10–12, 2019	351	± 5.2%	21%	1%	12%	1%	18%	3%	0%	–	10%	17%	5%	3% (Note: Williamson with 2%; Gillibrand with 1%; Inslee with 0%)	11%
Change Research	Jul 6–9, 2019	1,084	± 3.0%	19%	1%	13%	3%	15%	1%	1%	–	20%	22%	1%	3% (Note: Gillibrand, Hickenlooper, and Williamson with 1%; Bennet, de Blasio, Castro, Delaney, Inslee, Moulton, Ryan, and Swalwell with 0%)	–
Change Research	Jun 29 – Jul 4, 2019	420	–	13%	2%	14%	2%	13%	1%	2%	–	26%	24%	2%	4% (Note: Gillibrand, Gravel, Inslee, and Moulton with 1%; Bennet, Bullock, Castro, Delaney, Hickenlooper, Ryan, Swalwell, and Williamson with 0%)	–
Change Research	Jun 17–20, 2019	308	–	24%	0%	14%	1%	3%	1%	4%	–	28%	21%	1%	3% (Note: Delaney, Gravel, and Inslee with 1%; Bullock, Castro, de Blasio, Gillibrand, Hickenlooper, Messam, Moulton, Ryan, Swalwell, and Williamson with 0%)	–
YouGov/CBS News	May 31 – Jun 12, 2019	502	± 4.9%	33%	3%	10%	0%	7%	1%	4%	–	20%	17%	1%	2% (Note: Gillibrand and Hickenlooper with 1%; Bennet, Bullock, Castro, de Blasio, Delaney, Gravel, Inslee, Messam, Moulton, Ryan, Swalwell, and Williamson with 0%; others with 1%)	–
Tel Opinion Research*	May 20–22, 2019	600	± 4.0%	33%	–	7%	–	7%	–	1%	–	12%	11%	–	–	28%
Monmouth University	May 2–7, 2019	376	± 5.1%	36%	2%	9%	0%	6%	2%	2%	–	18%	8%	1%	2% (Note: Hickenlooper and Ryan with 1%; Bullock, Delaney, Gillibrand, and Williamson with <1%; Bennet, Castro, de Blasio, Gravel, Inslee, Messam, Moulton, and Swalwell with 0%)	11%
Change Research	May 3–5, 2019	864	± 3.3%	26%	2%	12%	1%	8%	1%	3%	–	30%	9%	2%	4% (Note: Delaney with 2%; Moulton, and Ryan with 1%; Abrams, Bennet, Bullock, Castro, Gillibrand, Gravel, Hickenlooper, Inslee, Swalwell, and Williamson with 0%)	–
Firehouse Strategies/Øptimus	Apr 30 – May 2, 2019	551	± 4.0%	34%	1%	10%	–	7%	1%	3%	–	16%	9%	–	–	19%
Suffolk University	Apr 25–28, 2019	429	± 4.7%	20%	3%	12%	1%	6%	1%	3%	–	12%	8%	1%	4% (Note: Delaney with 1%; Bennet, Bullock, Castro, de Blasio, Gillibrand, Gravel, Hickenlooper, Inslee, Messam, Moulton, Ryan, Swalwell, and Williamson with 0%; others with 0%)	27%
	Apr 25, 2019	Biden announces his candidacy														
University of New Hampshire	Apr 10–18, 2019	241	± 6.3%	18%	3%	15%	1%	4%	2%	3%	–	30%	5%	2%	5% (Note: Ryan with 2%; Gillibrand, Messam, and Swalwell with 1%; Castro, Delaney, Hickenlooper, Inslee, and Williamson with 0%; others with 0%)	12%
	Apr 14, 2019	Buttigieg announces his candidacy														
Saint Anselm College	Apr 3–8, 2019	326	± 5.4%	23%	4%	11%	1%	7%	2%	6%	–	16%	9%	–	9% (Note: Delaney, Gillibrand, and Hickenlooper with 1%; Inslee with 0%; others with 6%)	13%
	Mar 14, 2019	O'Rourke announces his candidacy														
University of New Hampshire	Feb 18–26, 2019	240	± 6.3%	22%	3%	1%	1%	10%	4%	5%	–	26%	7%	–	6% (Note: Bloomberg, Brown, and Gillibrand with 1%; Delaney and Hickenlooper with 0%; others with 3%)	14%
Emerson College	Feb 21–22, 2019	405	± 4.8%	25%	5%	1%	–	12%	8%	5%	–	27%	9%	–	10% (Note: Bloomberg with 2%; Brown, Delaney, and Gillibrand with 1%; Castro with 0%; others with 5%)	–
	Feb 19, 2019	Sanders announces his candidacy														
YouGov/UMass Amherst	Feb 7–15, 2019	337	± 6.4%	28%	3%	–	–	14%	1%	6%	–	20%	9%	–	9% (Note: Gillibrand with 3%; Bloomberg with 2%; Castro with 1%; others with 3%)	9%
	Feb 10, 2019	Klobuchar announces her candidacy														
	Feb 9, 2019	Warren announces her candidacy														
Firehouse Strategies/Øptimus	Jan 31 – Feb 2, 2019	518	± 4.1%	22%	4%	–	–	13%	2%	2%	–	13%	9%	–	0% (Note: Gillibrand with 0%)	35%
	Feb 1, 2019	Booker announces his candidacy														
	Jan 21, 2019	Harris announces her candidacy														
	Jan 11, 2019	Gabbard announces her candidacy														
Change Research	Jan 2–3, 2019	1,162	–	24%	3%	–	–	4%	2%	9%	–	26%	11%	–	22% (Note: Kennedy with 9%; Clinton with 3%; Bloomberg, Kerry, and Klobuchar with 2%; Brown, Bullock, Gillibrand, Hickenlooper, Ojeda, and Steyer with 1%; Castro, Cuomo, Delaney, Holder, Inslee, McAuliffe, Schultz, and Swalwell with 0%)	–
University of New Hampshire	Aug 2–19, 2018	198	± 7.0%	19%	6%	–	–	3%	–	–	–	30%	17%	–	12% (Note: Kennedy with 7%; Holder with 2%; O'Malley with 1%; Delaney, Gillibrand, and Hickenlooper with 0%; others with 2%)	12%
Suffolk University	Apr 26–30, 2018	295	± 5.7%	20%	8%	–	–	4%	–	–	4%	13%	26%	–	4% (Note: Gillibrand and McAuliffe with 2%)	18%
Suffolk University	Apr 26–30, 2018	295	± 5.7%	30%	10%	–	–	6%	–	–	8%	25%	–	–	6% (Note: Gillibrand with 3%; McAuliffe with 2%; others with 1%)	12%
University of New Hampshire	Apr 13–22, 2018	188	± 7.1%	26%	5%	–	–	6%	1%	–	–	28%	11%	–	9% (Note: Kennedy with 3%; O'Malley with 2%; Gillibrand and Hickenlooper with 1%; Ryan with 0%; others with 2%)	13%
University of New Hampshire	Jan 28 – Feb 10, 2018	219	± 6.6%	35%	3%	–	–	1%	0%	–	–	24%	15%	–	7% (Note: Gillibrand with 2%; O'Malley with 1%; others with 4%)	15%
	Nov 6, 2017	Yang announces his candidacy														
University of New Hampshire	Oct 3–15, 2017	212	± 6.7%	24%	6%	–	–	1%	1%	–	–	31%	13%	–	14% (Note: O'Malley with 3%; Hickenlooper and Zuckerberg with 2%; Gillibrand, and Ryan with 1%; Delaney with 0%; others with 5%)	11%

Head-to-head polls
Poll source	Date(s) administered	Sample size	Margin of error	Joe Biden	Pete Buttigieg	Bernie Sanders	Elizabeth Warren	Undecided
Tel Opinion Research	May 20–22, 2019	600	± 4.0%	63%	21%	–	–	15%
Tel Opinion Research	May 20–22, 2019	600	± 4.0%	66%	–	22%	–	13%
Tel Opinion Research	May 20–22, 2019	600	± 4.0%	58%	–	–	29%	13%
American Research Group	Mar 21–27, 2018	400	± 5.0%	47%	–	45%	–	7%
American Research Group	Mar 21–27, 2018	400	± 5.0%	58%	–	–	33%	8%

== Results ==
The first results in New Hampshire were released shortly after midnight from Dixville Notch. Although not on the ballot, Michael Bloomberg received three write-in votes, enough to carry the town. Bernie Sanders won the state by a margin of around four thousand votes over Pete Buttigieg, with Amy Klobuchar placing third. Sanders and Buttigieg each received nine pledged national convention delegates while Klobuchar received six. Sanders had previously won the state in his prior pursuit of the Democratic nomination in 2016 with some 152,000 votes (60.4% of the total) against Hillary Clinton.

Voter turnout set a new record for New Hampshire primaries with 298,377 ballots being cast, breaking the previous record of 287,527 set in the 2008 primary.

Popular vote share by county
Sanders—<30%
Sanders—30–40%
Buttigieg—<30%

Popular vote share by congressional district
Sanders—25–30%

2020 New Hampshire Democratic presidential primary
Candidate	Votes	%	Delegates
Bernie Sanders	76,384	25.60	9
Pete Buttigieg	72,454	24.28	9
Amy Klobuchar	58,714	19.68	6
Elizabeth Warren	27,429	9.19	
Joe Biden	24,944	8.36	
Tom Steyer	10,732	3.60	
Tulsi Gabbard	9,755	3.27	
Andrew Yang	8,312	2.79	
Michael Bloomberg (write-in)	4,675	1.57	
Deval Patrick	1,271	0.43	
Michael Bennet	952	0.32	
Cory Booker (withdrawn)	157	0.05	
Joe Sestak (withdrawn)	152	0.05	
Kamala Harris (withdrawn)	129	0.04	
Marianne Williamson (withdrawn)	99	0.03	
Julian Castro (withdrawn)	83	0.03	
John Delaney (withdrawn)	83	0.03	
Steve Bullock (withdrawn)	64	0.02	
Henry Hewes	43	0.01	
Ben Gleib (withdrawn)	31	0.01	
Other candidates / Write-in	(Note: Including 157 write-in votes)665	0.22	
Donald Trump (write-in Republican)	1,217	0.41	
Bill Weld (write-in Republican)	17	0.01	
Mitt Romney (write-in Republican)	10	0.00	
Other write-in Republicans	5	0.00	
Total	298,377	100%	24

=== Results by county ===
County	Bernie Sanders		Pete Buttigieg		Amy Klobuchar		Elizabeth Warren		Joe Biden		Various candidates		Margin		Total
County	#	%	#	%	#	%	#	%	#	%	#	%	#	%	Total
Belknap	2,670	23.54%	2,798	24.67%	2,323	20.48%	839	7.40%	1,122	9.89%	1,590	14.02%	-128	-1.13%	11,342
Carroll	2,608	23.25%	2,815	25.09%	2,464	21.96%	904	8.06%	1,020	9.09%	1,407	12.53%	-207	-1.84%	11,218
Cheshire	5,973	31.36%	4,053	21.28%	3,616	18.98%	1,816	9.53%	1,265	6.64%	2,325	12.21%	1,920	10.08%	19,048
Coös	1,562	28.90%	1,094	20.24%	937	17.34%	395	7.31%	566	10.47%	851	15.73%	468	8.66%	5,405
Grafton	6,606	27.09%	5,805	23.81%	4,277	17.54%	3,295	13.51%	1,689	6.93%	2,713	11.12%	801	3.28%	24,385
Hillsborough	21,659	25.51%	20,539	24.19%	16,702	19.67%	7,266	8.56%	7,375	8.69%	11,360	13.38%	1,120	1.32%	84,901
Merrimack	8,636	24.26%	8,466	23.78%	7,853	22.06%	3,177	8.93%	2,863	8.04%	4,599	12.91%	170	0.48%	35,594
Rockingham	15,331	22.64%	17,929	26.48%	13,736	20.29%	5,928	8.76%	6,069	8.96%	8,715	12.87%	-2,598	-3.84%	67,708
Strafford	8,919	29.88%	6,767	22.67%	5,180	17.35%	2,971	9.95%	2,251	7.54%	3,763	12.61%	2,152	7.21%	29,851
Sullivan	2,420	27.11%	2,188	24.52%	1,626	18.22%	838	9.39%	724	8.11%	1,129	12.66%	232	2.59%	8,925
Total	76,384	25.60%	72,454	24.28%	58,714	19.68%	27,429	9.19%	24,944	8.36%	38,452	12.90%	3,930	1.32%	298,377

== Analysis ==
Bernie Sanders narrowly won the New Hampshire primary with 25.6% of the vote, the lowest vote share a winner of this primary has ever received, with Pete Buttigieg finishing in second. By contrast, Amy Klobuchar finished in an unexpectedly strong third place. Elizabeth Warren and Joe Biden finished in fourth and fifth place, respectively, both of which were considered disappointing finishes. Geographically, Sanders won the largest cities in New Hampshire, including Manchester, Nashua, and Concord. Buttigieg kept the race close by performing strongly in the southeastern part of the state, including in the suburbs of Boston and in the nearby, more rural Lakes Region.

Exit polls showed that Sanders benefited from his strong performance among young voters as he won about half of the under-30 vote, with this group making up about 14% of the electorate. Among those under the age of 45, he won 42% of the vote; this larger group made up about a third of the electorate. Buttigieg received only 21% of the vote among those under the age of 45 but outperformed Sanders 26–17 among voters 45 and older. Both Sanders and Buttigieg lost the 45-and-older vote to Klobuchar, who received 27% of the vote in this group. Similarly, Klobuchar convincingly won among voters aged 65 and older, receiving 32% of their votes, as compared to only 14% for Sanders and 12% for Biden. Ideologically, about 60% of voters identified as either "very liberal" or "somewhat liberal", and Sanders won this group with about 33% of the vote. By contrast, among the remaining 40% of voters who identified as "moderate" or "conservative", Buttigieg and Klobuchar approximately tied with 27 and 26% of the vote, respectively.

== Aftermath ==
Following poor showings in the New Hampshire primary, Senator Michael Bennet of Colorado, entrepreneur Andrew Yang and former Massachusetts governor Deval Patrick withdrew from the race. With the end of these campaigns, the Democratic field numbered fewer than ten candidates for the first time since early 2019.

== See also ==
- 2020 New Hampshire Republican presidential primary
- "Live from Lanford", an episode of The Conners
- New Hampshire midnight voting
