= Katherine Rogers =

American politician

Member of New Hampshire House of Representatives for Merrimack 28
- In office December 5, 2012 – April 10, 2022
- Succeeded by: Art Ellison

Personal details
- Born: March 7, 1955 Concord, New Hampshire
- Died: April 10, 2022 (aged 67) Concord, New Hampshire
- Party: Democratic

Katherine (Kathi) Diane Rogers (March 7, 1955 – April 10, 2022) was an American politician. She was a member of the New Hampshire House of Representatives.

== Biography ==
Rogers began her political career in 1976 working for the Jimmy Carter campaign in the 1976 New Hampshire presidential primary. Rogers worked as a prosecutor for the Allenstown Police Department. She served eight terms in the New Hampshire House of Representatives and eight terms on the City Council in Concord, New Hampshire. She took particular focus on public education. She was an advocate for causes such as gun control and animal rights. In 2017, she was charged with assaulting a gun rights activist.

Rogers died in office from cancer in 2022.
