= Dixville Notch, New Hampshire =

Unincorporated community in New Hampshire, United States

- Unincorporated community
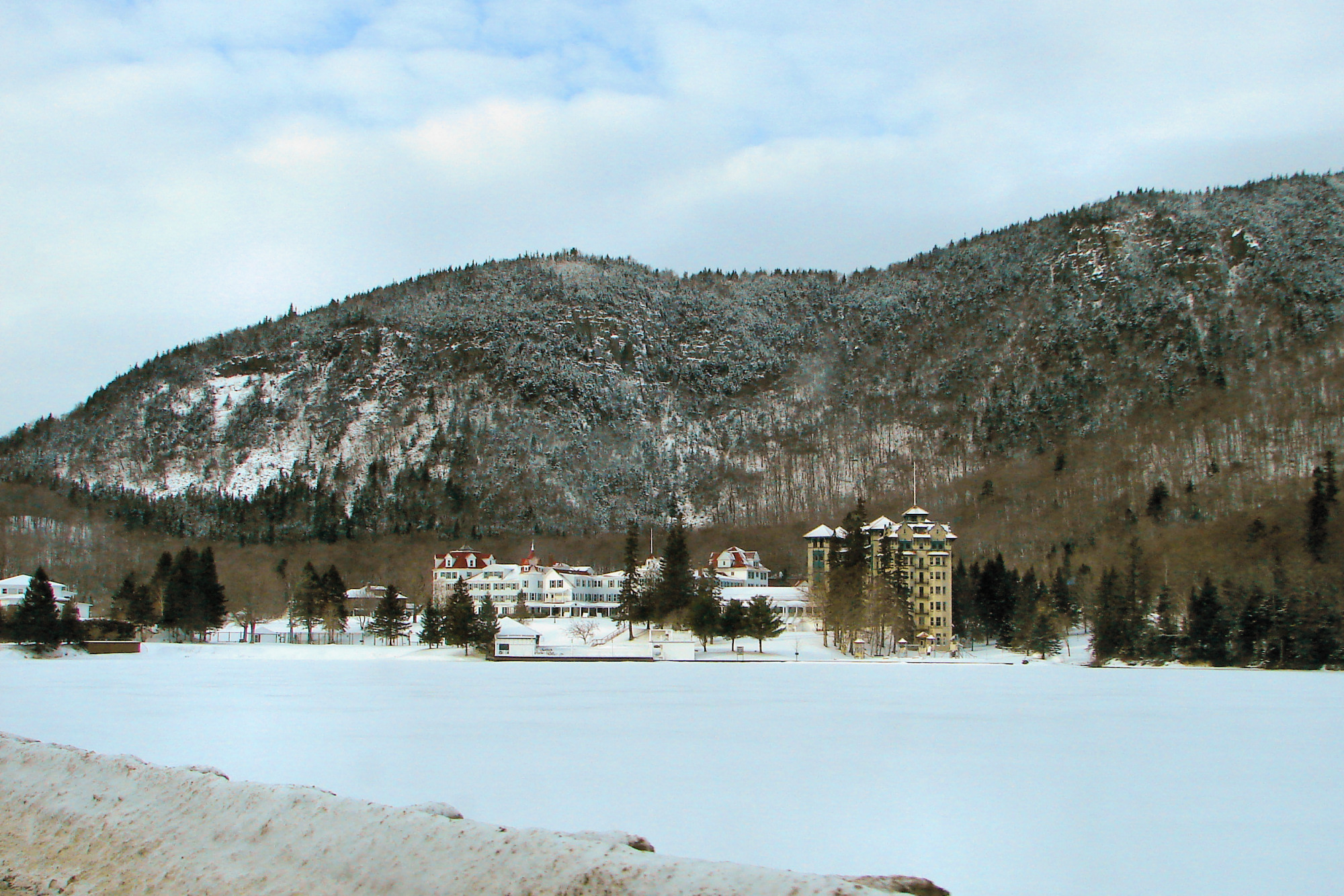
- The Balsams, a resort hotel in Dixville Notch and the site of the "midnight vote"

- Location within New Hampshire Location within the United States
- Coordinates: 44°52′15″N 71°18′21″W
- Country: United States
- State: New Hampshire
- County: Coos
- Township: Dixville
- Elevation: 1,880 ft (570 m)

Population (2020)
  - Total: 4
- Time zone: UTC-5 (Eastern (EST))
  - Summer (DST): UTC-4 (EDT)
- Area code: 603
- GNIS feature ID: 866591

Dixville Notch is an unincorporated community in Dixville township, Coös County, New Hampshire, United States. The population of the township, all of whom live in Dixville Notch, was 4 as of the 2020 census. The village is known for being the first place to declare its results during the New Hampshire presidential primary. It is located in the northern part of the state, approximately 20 miles (32 km) south of the border with the Canadian province of Quebec. The village is situated at about 1,800 feet (550 m) above sea level at the base of mountains.

The village shares its name with Dixville Notch, a mountain pass that lies about 0.5 miles (0.8 km) southeast of and 100 feet (30 m) uphill from the village. The notch is located between Dixville Peak and Sanguinary Mountain, separating the Connecticut River's watershed from that of the Androscoggin River. The village is the location of The Balsams Grand Resort Hotel, one of a handful of surviving New Hampshire grand hotels, situated on a 15,000-acre (61 km^{2}) property, accommodating golfing in the summer and skiing in the winter.

Dixville Notch is part of the Berlin, NH–VT Micropolitan Statistical Area.

== History ==
Neil Tillotson moved to Dixville Notch in 1954, and became the town moderator and owner of The Balsams. He did not like having to drive 45 minutes to the nearest polling station, but learned about midnight voting from an Associated Press reporter. The state legislature approved the town's request to become a voting precinct. Tom Tillotson has been the town moderator since 1976. As of January 2024, the town has six voters: four Republicans and two independents.

== Politics ==
=== Midnight voting tradition ===
Dixville Notch is best known in connection with its longstanding midnight vote in the U.S. presidential election, including during the New Hampshire primary, the first primary election in the U.S. presidential nomination process. In a tradition that started in the 1960 election, all the eligible voters in Dixville Notch gather at midnight in the ballroom of The Balsams. The voters cast their ballots and the polls are officially closed when all of the registered voters have voted – sometimes merely one minute later. The results of the Dixville Notch vote in both the New Hampshire primary and the general election are traditionally broadcast around the country immediately afterwards.

A similar tradition in the town of Hart's Location in adjacent Carroll County began in 1948. Theirs was discontinued in the 1960s in light of the abundance of media attention, revived in 1996, and discontinued again in 2024. Informal competition for the distinction of the first town to report election results has been ongoing for several election cycles, among a number of small communities, including:

- Coos County:
  - Dixville Notch
  - Millsfield (the township to the south of Dixville township)
- Carroll County (to the southeast of Coos County):
  - Hart's Location
- Grafton County (to the southwest of Coos County):
  - Ellsworth
  - Waterville Valley

Press accounts occasionally state erroneously that Dixville Notch "votes first" in U.S. presidential elections. However, the village does hold a number of voting records within the United States:

- Longest continuous record of midnight voting
- Highest count of midnight presidential primaries (13 as of 2008, vs. 5 to 9 for Hart's Location)
- At least one of the first handful of lawful votes, nationwide, in each presidential campaign's binding primaries
- Often first to report its returns

Dixville Notch was granted the authority to conduct its own elections in 1960 and chose to open its polls at midnight. In 1964, the primary election returns were the first in New Hampshire to be reported by UPI and the Associated Press. Since then, Dixville Notch has gained international media attention as the first community to vote in the presidential primary season, since New Hampshire's primary is required by state law to be scheduled earlier than any competitor. Dixville Notch also votes at midnight in the general presidential election in November, although this usually attracts less press attention than primary voting.

Although most New Hampshire polling stations open around sunrise and close in the early evening, Dixville Notch takes advantage of a state law that allows a precinct to close if all registered voters in that precinct have cast ballots. Consequently, all registered voters in Dixville Notch gather and are counted before the balloting takes place. The "Ballot Room" of the Balsams Hotel resort served as the polling place until a recent fire. This room featured separate voting booths for each citizen.

The tradition was first organized by prominent Dixville Notch resident Neil Tillotson (1898 – October 17, 2001), who was traditionally the first voter. He would reportedly hold his ballot over the ballot box while watching his wristwatch. At the moment of midnight, Tillotson would drop the ballot into the ballot box and the rest of the town's residents would follow suit. Since Tillotson's death from pneumonia in 2001 at the age of 102, the first voter has been chosen by random ballot beforehand.

In the presidential election of November 2, 2004, the village had 26 registered voters, roughly half of whom were registered as Republican. The other half were registered "undeclared" or unaffiliated with a party. New Hampshire law allows a voter to declare or change a party affiliation upon arriving at the polling place, meaning that a number of the town's independent voters vote in the Democratic party primary.

The votes are counted immediately after all are received. The Dixville Notch results of the primary, and now the Hart's Location ones as well, often lead morning news programs on election day. During every election year between 1968 and 2012, the candidate with the plurality of Dixville Notch's voters has been the eventual Republican nominee for president. On the Democratic side, the village's election results have less often predicted the nominee. In 2000, for example, Bill Bradley won the most votes among Dixville Notch's Democratic primary voters, although Al Gore was the party's eventual nominee.

The eventual nationwide winners for each contest are indicated in bold.

=== Federal voting results ===
==== Primaries ====
Year	Votes & results, Democratic primary		Votes & results, Republican primary		
1960					9
1964			9	Richard Nixon – 3; Henry Cabot Lodge Jr. – 3; Nelson Rockefeller – 2; **Barry Goldwater** – 1	9
1968	1	Richard Nixon – 1, write-in	6	**Richard Nixon** – 5; Wallace Johnson – 1, write-in	12
1972	6	Edmund Muskie – 5; **George McGovern** – 1	11	**Richard Nixon** – 11	19
1976	6	**Jimmy Carter** – 6; Birch Bayh – 1	18	**Gerald Ford** – 11; Ronald Reagan – 4; Nelson Rockefeller – 2; Barry Goldwater – 1	25
1980	6	**Jimmy Carter** – 3; Ted Kennedy – 2; Jerry Brown – 1	17	**Ronald Reagan** – 5; George H. W. Bush – 5; Howard Baker – 4; John B. Anderson – 1; John Connally – 1; Philip Crane – 1	23
1984	6	Ernest Hollings – 3; **Walter Mondale** – 2; Gary Hart – 1	20	**Ronald Reagan** – 15; Ernest Hollings – 5	30
1988	7	Dick Gephardt – 4; Paul Simon – 3	27	**George H. W. Bush** – 11; Bob Dole – 6; Jack Kemp – 5; Alexander Haig – 2; Pierre "Pete" DuPont – 2; Pat Robertson – 1	38
1992	4	**Bill Clinton** – 3; Paul Tsongas – 1; Libertarian Primary: **Andre Marrou** – 10	14	**George H. W. Bush** – 9; Pat Buchanan – 3; Paul Tsongas – 1, write-in; Andre Marrou – 1, write-in	30
1996	12	**Bill Clinton** – 12	20	**Bob Dole** – 11; Lamar Alexander – 5; Pat Buchanan – 2; Steve Forbes – 1; Richard Lugar – 1	28
2000	6	Bill Bradley – 4; **Al Gore** – 2	23	**George W. Bush** – 12; John McCain – 10; Steve Forbes – 1	27
2004	15	Wesley Clark – 8; **John Kerry** – 3; John Edwards – 2; Howard Dean – 1; Joe Lieberman – 1	11	**George W. Bush** – 11	26
2008	10	**Barack Obama** – 7; John Edwards – 2; Bill Richardson – 1	7	**John McCain** – 4; Mitt Romney – 2; Rudy Giuliani – 1	21
2012	3	**Barack Obama** – 3	6	Jon Huntsman Jr. – 2; **Mitt Romney** – 2; Ron Paul – 1; Newt Gingrich – 1	10
2016	4	Bernie Sanders – 4	5	John Kasich – 3; **Donald Trump** – 2	8
2020	4	Michael Bloomberg – 2, write-in; Bernie Sanders – 1; Pete Buttigieg – 1	1	Michael Bloomberg – 1, write-in	5
2024			6	Nikki Haley – 6	6

==== Presidential elections ====
United States presidential election results for Dixville Notch, New Hampshire
Year	Republican		Democratic		Third party(ies)	
Year	No.	%	No.	%	No.	%
2024	3	50.00%	3	50.00%	0	**0.00%**
2020	0	0.00%	5	**100.00%**	0	0.00%
2016	2	25.00%	4	**50.00%**	2	25.00%
2012	5	50.00%	5	50.00%	0	**0.00%**
2008	6	28.57%	15	**71.43%**	0	0.00%
2004	19	**73.08%**	7	26.92%	0	0.00%
2000	21	**77.78%**	5	18.52%	1	3.70%
1996	18	**64.29%**	8	28.57%	2	7.14%
1992	15	**50.00%**	2	6.67%	13	43.33%
1988	34	**89.47%**	3	7.89%	1	2.63%
1984	29	**96.67%**	1	3.33%	0	0.00%
1980	17	**73.91%**	3	13.04%	3	13.04%
1976	13	**52.00%**	11	44.00%	1	4.00%
1972	16	**84.21%**	3	15.79%	0	0.00%
1968	4	33.33%	8	**66.67%**	0	0.00%
1964	8	**88.89%**	1	11.11%	0	0.00%
1960	9	**100.00%**	0	0.00%	0	0.00%

In 1992, the Libertarian Party unsuccessfully attempted to capitalize upon Andre Marrou's unexpectedly strong showing in Dixville Notch in the general election. In 2004, Democratic candidate Wesley Clark was the only contender to personally visit Dixville Notch. He was on hand when the votes were cast and counted, and he received the majority of Democratic votes cast. Clark placed third and received 13 percent of votes statewide.

In 2008, Senator Barack Obama became the first Democrat to win the community's vote in a presidential election since 1968, by a margin of 15 to 6.

In 2012, the Dixville Notch result delivered a tie for the first time in its history, with Barack Obama and Mitt Romney receiving five votes each.

In 2016, Democratic candidate Hillary Clinton won the community's vote, beating Republican candidate Donald Trump, 4 to 2. Libertarian candidate Gary Johnson received one vote. Mitt Romney received a single write-in vote. Eight people voted in total.

In 2019, the community was at risk of losing its ability to conduct its own election and having to combine with another municipality for voting, as its population had been reduced to four people, one too few to hold all the positions needed to conduct an election in New Hampshire. Dixville Notch received a reprieve before the primary when a fifth person, Les Otten, developer of The Balsams, agreed to move there in time for the election.

When the community's five residents convened for the 2020 primary, former New York City Mayor Michael Bloomberg received three votes as a write-in candidate. The other two votes went to Democrats Pete Buttigieg and Bernie Sanders.

In 2020, former Vice President Joe Biden won over incumbent Republican Donald Trump, winning the votes of all five of the community's voting residents.

In 2024, presidential candidate Nikki Haley won unanimous support of all six voting-age residents over former president Donald Trump during the New Hampshire GOP primary.

In 2024, the presidential election results resulted in a tie for the second time in its history, with three votes to Kamala Harris and three votes to Donald Trump.

== See also ==
- Hart's Location, New Hampshire
- List of mountain passes in New Hampshire
- New Hampshire Historical Marker No. 171: Dixville Notch – "First in the Nation"
