= Les Otten =

American business executive (born 1949)

Leslie B. Otten
- Born: 1949 (age 76–77); Teaneck, New Jersey, U.S.
- Education: Ithaca College (BS)
- Occupation: Business executive
- Known for: Former CEO of American Skiing Company
- Political party: Republican

Leslie B. Otten (born 1949) is the former CEO of the American Skiing Company. Since resigning as its chief executive officer in 2001, Otten has been involved in numerous other businesses and industries, including the Major League Baseball's Boston Red Sox.

== Early life and career ==
Otten was born in Teaneck, New Jersey, where he received his early education. He graduated high school from the Hun School of Princeton in Princeton, New Jersey, in 1967 and was named an Alumnus of the Year in 1999. Otten received a B.S. in Business Administration from Ithaca College in 1971, after which he worked for Killington and Sunday River ski resorts. In 1980, he purchased Sunday River, and his company, LBO Resort Enterprises, grew by acquiring Sugarbush, Attitash Bear Peak, and Cranmore in the Vermont-New Hampshire skiing areas.

== Ski industry career ==
Otten started his career at Killington Ski Resort in Vermont in 1971. In 1973, at the age of 23, Otten was named ski operation manager of Sunday River in Newry, Maine. In 1980 Otten purchased Sunday River. In 1989, Otten was named Inc. Magazine Entrepreneur of the Year, Turnaround Category.

In 1995 he formed American Skiing Company by acquiring S-K-I, and this expanded his resorts to include Killington, Mount Snow, Haystack, Waterville Valley, and Sugarloaf/USA. He was forced to divest his interests in Waterville Valley and Cranmore but went on to buy Pico Peak in Vermont.

Under Otten, American Skiing Company invested heavily in marketing and infrastructure. While these investments are credited with major turnaround and growth, they overleveraged the company. A later bailout by an investment firm ultimately caused him to leave day-to-day operations while remaining on the Board of Directors. Otten resigned this position on February 26, 2007, to pursue other options.

In 2009, Otten was inducted into the Maine Ski Hall of Fame.

On February 28, 2016, The Boston Globe reported that Otten had purchased part of the now-closed Balsams Resort in Dixville Notch, New Hampshire. According to the article, Otten plans to spend over $100 million to renovate and rebuild the resort with the goal of turning it into a four seasons destination. If finished, the skiing area would be the largest in New England, with 2,200 acres of skiiable terrain.

On March 23, 2024, Otten was inducted into the US Ski and Snowboard Hall of Fame during "Skiing History Celebration" in Park City, Utah.

== Boston Red Sox ==
From 2002 through 2007, Otten was vice chairman and minority partner of the Boston Red Sox American Major League Baseball franchise. In 2004, the Red Sox won their first World Series Championship since 1918 while Otten was part of the ownership group.

== Political career ==
Otten was a candidate for Governor of Maine in the 2010 election, announcing his participation in the Republican gubernatorial primary on October 19, 2009. Otten first announced an exploratory committee on June 22, 2009. Otten was defeated in the Republican primary by Waterville mayor Paul LePage,

Otten stated in 2020 that he would vote for Democrat Joe Biden for President, despite being a Republican. However, it was reported that Otten voted Democrat for the first time in 2024, for Kamala Harris.

== Personal life and family ==
Otten lived in Greenwood, Maine, until early 2020. When he learned that the town of Dixville Notch, New Hampshire, had dwindled to a population of four and would be unable to continue its tradition of midnight voting without at least five selectmen, Otten moved to Dixville Notch to ensure the practice would survive.

== Electoral history ==
2010 Maine gubernatorial Republican primary results
Party	Candidate	Votes	%
Republican	Paul LePage	49,126	37.4
Republican	Les Otten	22,945	17.4
Republican	Peter Mills	19,271	14.7
Republican	Steve Abbott	17,209	13.1
Republican	William Beardsley	12,061	9.2
Republican	Bruce Poliquin	6,471	4.9
Republican	Matt Jacobson	4,324	3.3
Total votes		131,407	100
