= Neil Tillotson =

American inventor (1898–2001)

Personal details
- Born: December 16, 1898 Canaan, Vermont, US
- Died: October 17, 2001 (aged 102) Colebrook, New Hampshire, US
- Party: Republican
- Spouse(s): Dorothy, Alma, Louise
- Children: 5
- Education: Lowell Technological Institute

Military service
- Allegiance: United States
- Branch/service: United States Army
- Unit: 7th Cavalry Regiment
- Battles/wars: World War I

Neil E. Tillotson (December 16, 1898 – October 17, 2001) was the inventor of the modern production methods for latex balloons and latex gloves as well as the founder of Tillotson Rubber Company. Later, as a resident of Dixville Notch, New Hampshire, he was the first voter in every American presidential primary and presidential election from the time he took residence there to his death in 2001.

== Business career ==
Working at Hood Rubber in the 1920s as a researcher, Tillotson lost his job as a result of the Great Depression. Out of desperation and boredom, Tillotson discovered a way to make latex balloons economically. He founded the Tillotson Rubber Company in 1931 to produce them. His first product was hand-painted balloons in the shape of a cat's head, but he soon branched out into other offerings. In 1931, despite the Depression, Tillotson Rubber made USD $85,000 in sales (equivalent to $1.2 million in 2009).

Tillotson's company invented the high-speed latex dipping machinery that made possible his later invention in the 1960s, latex examination gloves that fit either hand. He remained active in the company until suffering a stroke in June 2001.

=== Other ventures ===
In 1968, Tillotson co-founded Tillotson Pearson Inc. along with Everett Pearson, the co-founder of Pearson Yachts, and sold his interests in the company in 1992.

== Politics ==
In 1954, Tillotson purchased The Balsams Grand Resort Hotel in Dixville Notch, New Hampshire, and subsequently moved there. After a successful bid to create a polling location at Dixville Notch, he was the first voter in every American presidential primary and presidential election for 40 years, until his death at age 102. His casting his vote immediately after midnight was often covered in the press. Tillotson was a Republican, but regarding his choice of candidates, he stated, "'I think the first thing you look for is honesty. The next thing is, has he got a brain? And is he emotionally reasonably stable?"

== Personal life ==
At the time of his death, Tillotson and his first wife, Dorothy Gardner, had three children: daughters Neila and Janet, son John; with second wife, Alma Eastin, had two sons, Rick and Tom. Additionally, he had 22 grandchildren, 23 great-grandchildren, and one great-great-grandchild.
