= The Balsams Grand Resort Hotel =

Coordinates: 44°52′14″N 71°18′28″W

- The Balsams
- U.S. National Register of Historic Places
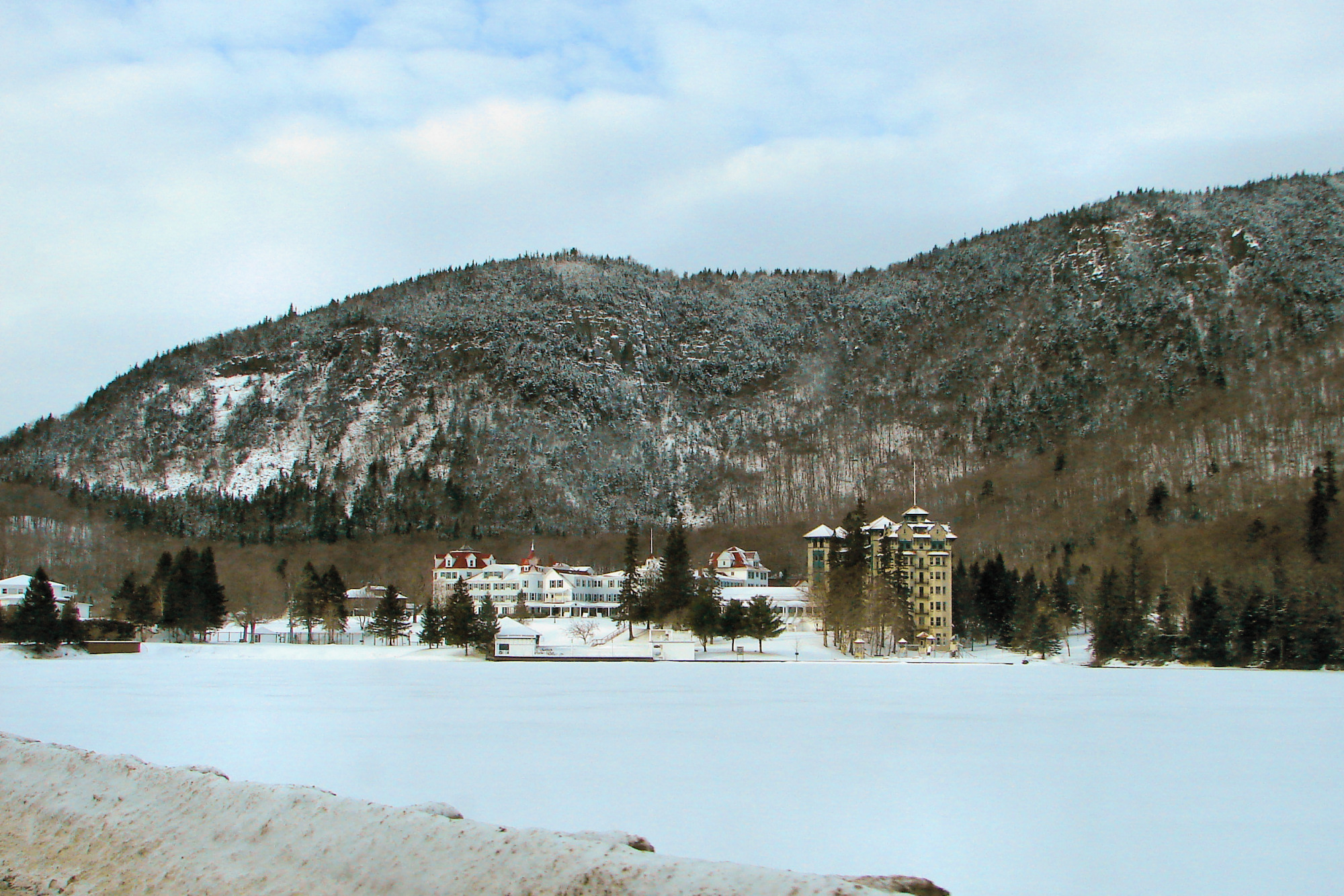
- The Balsams Grand Resort Hotel in Dixville Notch
- Location: NH 26, Coös County, New Hampshire, 10 mi. E of Colebrook
- Nearest city: Dixville Notch, New Hampshire
- Built: 1875
- NRHP reference No.: 02000166
- Added to NRHP: March 13, 2002

The Balsams Grand Resort Hotel is a grand hotel and ski resort located in Dixville Notch in New Hampshire, United States. It has been closed since 2011. The resort grounds cover 11,000 acres (45 km^{2}) and feature 95 km (59 mi) of cross-country ski trails, an alpine ski area with 16 trails, five glade areas and a terrain park. There is also a nine-hole golf course and an 18-hole championship course called "Panorama" which was designed by Donald Ross. The site continues to be a polling place for the New Hampshire midnight voting on the day of state's primary and general elections.

== History ==
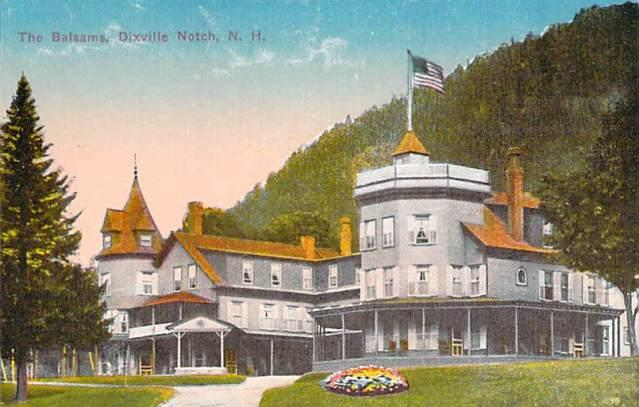
The Balsams c. 1915

Located along the old Coös Trail, now Route 26, through Dixville Notch, opened just after the Civil War as the Dix House, a 25-room summer inn established by George Parsons. In 1895, it was purchased by Henry S. Hale, a Philadelphia inventor and industrialist who had been a regular guest. He renamed it "The Balsams", and over time enlarged and augmented the facilities. In 1918, Hale completed the Hampshire House, the towering wing which doubled the resort's capacity to 400 guests.

The Ballot Room at The Balsams is where Dixville Notch's presidential primary votes are cast just after midnight on the day of the New Hampshire primaries since the 1960s. These votes cast by Dixville Notch residents are among the first to be cast, counted, and reported nationally.

=== Current operations ===
In December 2011, The Balsams closed to the public after being purchased by new owners for $2.3 million, and remains closed as of January 2021 as its owners continue to seek financing for their redevelopment and expansion efforts. In 2014, former American Skiing Company head Les Otten joined the Balsams redevelopment effort. Included in Otten's current plan is a massive expansion of the ski area to around 1,000 acres and the addition of multiple lifts, including a year-round gondola to the summit and a lift connection across Route 26 to the hotel complex.

The expanded ski area would be quadruple its current size and be one of the largest ski areas in the Northeast. Plans call for the renovation of the main hotel buildings, the Dix and Hampshire houses, as well as a new hotel wing, and renovations to the golf course clubhouse. The plans call for the conversion of a portion of the existing buildings from hotel rooms to condominiums as well as the potential construction of additional condominium units.

Otten has stated that the project to redevelop the hotel and resort would cost an estimated $170 million. After years of effort by the owners of the property, New Hampshire Governor Chris Sununu signed the so-called "Balsams Bill" into law in May 2019, allowing the Coös County Commissioners to create a tax increment financing district around the Balsams. Otten seeks to sell $28 million of bonds under the municipal finance structure in order to begin the redevelopment. In 2021, Provident Resources Group, a national nonprofit, agreed to finance the construction of the new hotel. The development team later announced the addition of Goldman Sachs to advance the financing of the project. This led to a surge in real-estate interest, with over 500 pre-sale commitments totaling $30 million by June 2022.

As of September 2024, the Dix House is to be demolished and reconstructed, the Hampshire House restored, and a new Lake Gloriette House hotel built. Phase 1 includes three new chairlifts. Otten noted ongoing progress after “stops and starts,” with his team of about 10 employees advancing permits, snowmaking water plans, dining options, a culinary school, and other year-round amenities.

== See also ==
- National Register of Historic Places listings in Coos County, New Hampshire
