= 1984 New Hampshire Republican presidential primary =

- February 28, 1984
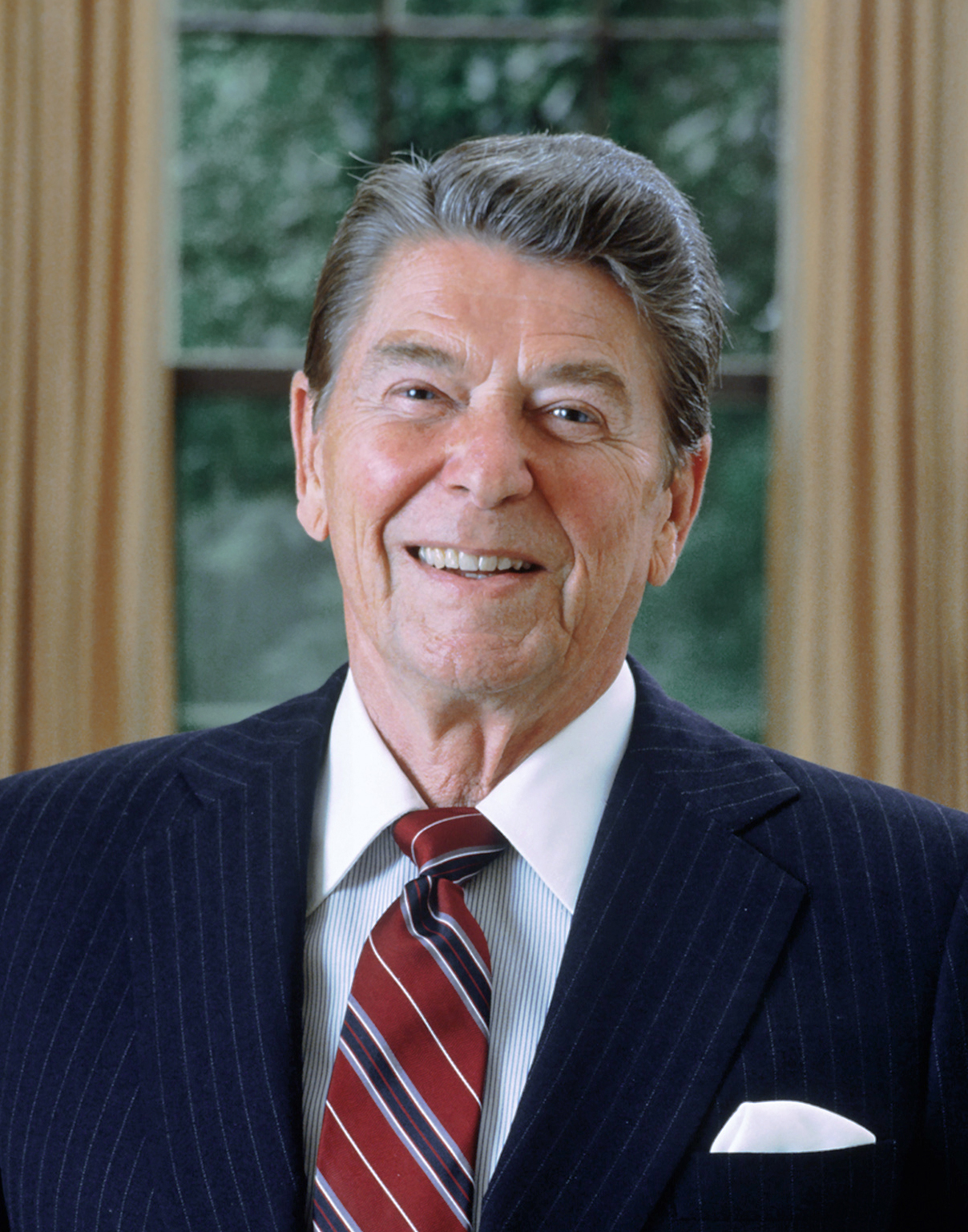

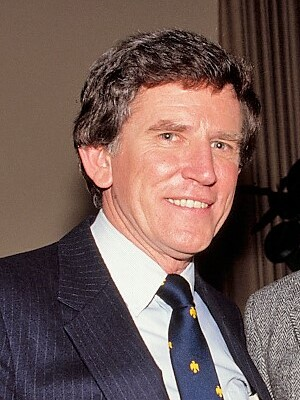
Candidate	Ronald Reagan	Gary Hart (write-in)
Home state	California	Colorado
Popular vote	65,033	3,968
Percentage	86.4%	5.3%
- Municipality results Reagan Hart

The 1984 New Hampshire Republican presidential primary was held on February 28, 1984, in New Hampshire as one of the Republican Party's statewide nomination contests ahead of the 1984 United States presidential election. Incumbent President Ronald Reagan ran virtually unopposed, and thus won the Granite State in a landslide.
