= 1972 New Hampshire Republican presidential primary =

- March 7, 1972

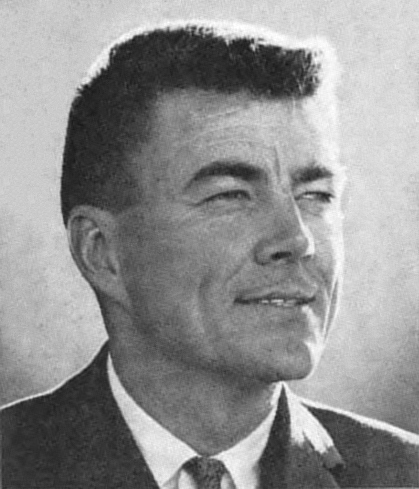

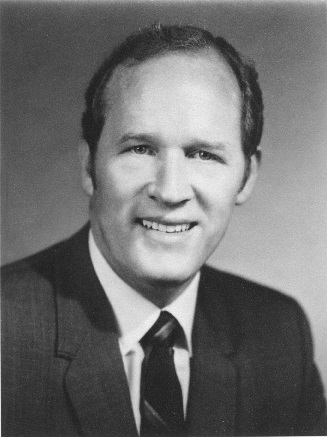
Candidate	Richard Nixon	Pete McCloskey	John M. Ashbrook
Home state	California	California	Ohio
Popular vote	79,239	23,180	11,362
Percentage	67.6%	19.8%	9.7%

Margin by county
Nixon: 50–60% 60–70%
Winner by municipality
Nixon
McCloskey
No vote

The 1972 New Hampshire Republican presidential primary was held on March 7, 1972, in New Hampshire as one of the Republican Party's statewide nomination contests ahead of the 1972 United States presidential election. Incumbent President Richard Nixon faced his first major test in New Hampshire against two minor challengers: liberal anti-Vietnam war candidate Pete McCloskey of California and conservative John Ashbrook of Ohio, who opposed Nixon's détente policies towards China and the Soviet Union. Nixon won the Granite State in a landslide, resulting in the withdrawal of McCloskey from the primaries (he promised to do so if he failed to reach >20% of the vote) and a clear path for the incumbent president to receive the Republican nomination.

== Results ==
1972 Republican Party primary in New Hampshire
Candidate	Votes	%
Richard M. Nixon (incumbent)	79,239	67.6
Paul N. McCloskey	23,190	19.8
John M. Ashbrook	11,362	9.7
Others	3,417	2.9
Total votes	117,208	100.0
