= 1980 United States presidential election in New Hampshire =

- November 4, 1980

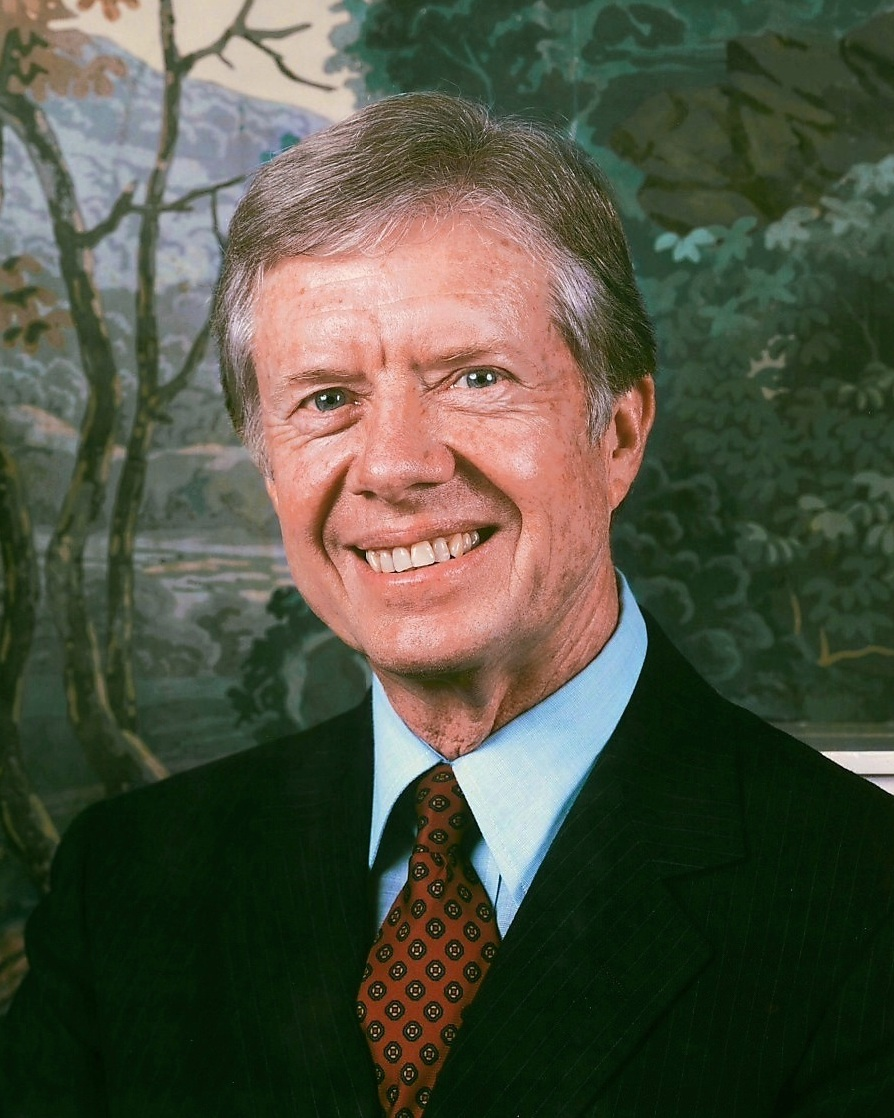

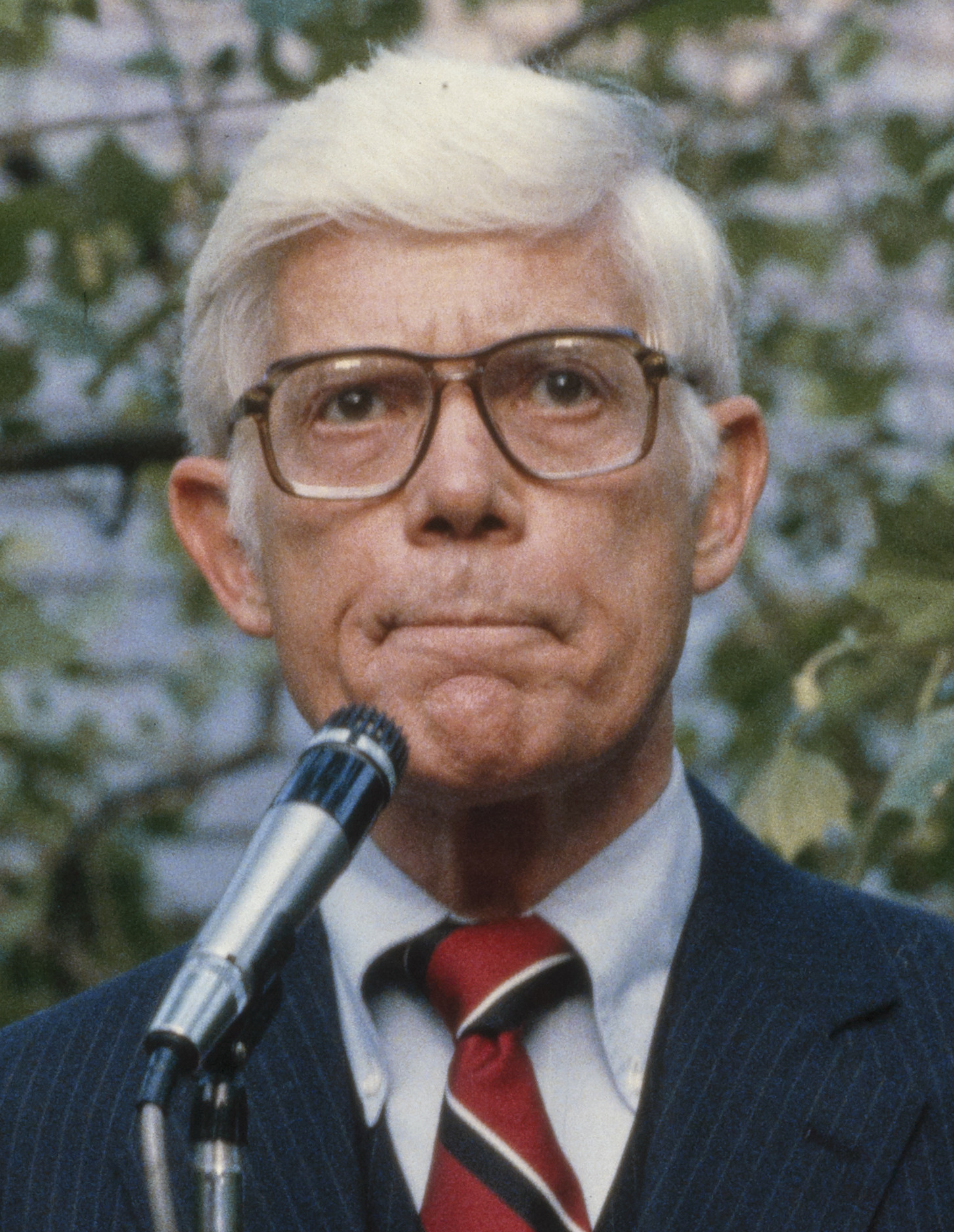
Nominee	Ronald Reagan	Jimmy Carter	John B. Anderson
Party	Republican	Democratic	Independent
Home state	California	Georgia	Illinois
Running mate	George H. W. Bush	Walter Mondale	Patrick Lucey
Electoral vote	4	0	0
Popular vote	221,705	108,864	49,693
Percentage	57.74%	28.35%	12.94%

Reagan
30–40%
40–50%
50–60%
60–70%
70–80%
80–90%
90–100%
Carter
30–40%
60–70%
Anderson
40–50%
Clark
100%
President before election
Jimmy Carter
Democratic
Elected President
Ronald Reagan
Republican

The 1980 United States presidential election in New Hampshire took place on November 4, 1980, as part of the 1980 United States presidential election, which was held throughout all 50 states and D.C. Voters chose four representatives, or electors to the Electoral College, who voted for president and vice president.

New Hampshire was won by the Republican nominees, former actor and Governor Ronald Reagan of California and former CIA Director George H.W. Bush of Texas. Reagan and Bush defeated the Democratic nominees, incumbent President Jimmy Carter of Georgia and his running mate incumbent Vice President Walter Mondale of Minnesota. Also in the running was former Republican Congressman John B. Anderson of Illinois, who ran as an independent with former Ambassador and Governor Patrick Lucey of Wisconsin.

Reagan took 57.74% of the vote to Carter's 28.35%, a margin of 29.39%. Anderson finished in a relatively strong third for a third party candidate, receiving 12.94% of the vote.

The already embattled incumbent Democratic president Carter was hurt in the state by the strong third party candidacy of John Anderson, a liberal Republican Congressman who ran in 1980 as an independent after failing to win the Republican Party's own presidential nomination. Anderson proved very popular with liberal and moderate voters in New England who normally leaned Democratic but were dissatisfied with the policies of the Carter Administration and viewed Reagan as too far to the right. The defection of these voters would push Carter below 30% of the vote and greatly widen Reagan's margin of victory over Carter in New Hampshire. New England overall would prove to be Anderson's strongest region in the nation, with all 6 New England states giving double-digit percentages to Anderson. In fact, New Hampshire would prove to be Anderson's fourth strongest state in the nation after Massachusetts, Vermont and Rhode Island, his 12.94% of the vote in the state was nearly double the 6.61% he got nationwide.

New Hampshire in this era normally leaned Republican; in 1976, the state had been won comfortably by moderate Republican Gerald Ford, who took 54.75% of the vote to Carter's 43.47%, a GOP victory margin of 11.28%, even as Carter narrowly won the election nationwide.

However the challenger Reagan would prove to be unusually popular among New Hampshire voters. Reagan won most Northeastern states by single-digit margins and with pluralities of less than 50% of the vote, potentially making Anderson, who took double-digit support, a spoiler that cost Carter victories in many of these normally liberal states. In neighboring Vermont, Reagan won the state with only 44% of the vote and a margin of 5.96%. Reagan won neighboring Maine by an even smaller 3.36% margin. Relative to the nation, Vermont would trend Democratic by 17 points and Maine would trend Democratic by over 9 points in the 1980 election. However, New Hampshire, sandwiched in the middle, had a unique conservative streak to its politics for a Northeastern state. New Hampshire would ultimately be the only state in New England to give Reagan an absolute majority of the vote, with a commanding 57.74%. The state would trend 6 points toward the GOP relative to the nation in the 1980 election.

== Primaries ==
=== Democratic primary ===
1980 Democratic Primary
Candidate	Votes	Delegates
Jimmy Carter (incumbent)	52,648	11
Ted Kennedy	41,687	9
Jerry Brown	10,686	0
Others	6,574	0
Totals	111,595	20

=== Republican primary ===
1980 Republican Primary
Candidate	Votes	Delegates
Ronald Reagan	72,983	14
George Bush	33,443	6
Howard Baker	18,943	3
John Anderson	14,458	0
Others	6,707	0
Totals	146,534	23

== Results ==
1980 United States presidential election in New Hampshire
Party	Candidate	Votes	Percentage	Electoral votes
Republican	Ronald Reagan	221,705	57.74%	4
Democratic	Jimmy Carter (incumbent)	108,864	28.35%	0
Independent	John B. Anderson	49,693	12.94%	0
Libertarian	Ed Clark	2,067	0.54%	0
Citizens	Barry Commoner	1,325	0.35%	0
Communist	Gus Hall	129	0.03%	0
Workers World	Deirdre Griswold	76	0.02%	0
Socialist Workers	Clifton DeBerry	72	0.02%	0
Write-ins	Write-ins	68	0.02%	0
Totals		383,999	100.00%	4
Voter Turnout (Voting age/Registered)				57%/70%

=== Results by county ===
County	Ronald Reagan Republican		Jimmy Carter Democratic		John B. Anderson Independent		Ed Clark Libertarian		Barry Commoner Citizens		Various candidates Other parties		Margin		Total votes cast
County	#	%	#	%	#	%	#	%	#	%	#	%	#	%	Total votes cast
Belknap	12,077	65.12%	4,365	23.54%	1,996	10.76%	71	0.38%	33	0.18%	4	0.02%	7,712	41.58%	18,546
Carroll	9,980	67.25%	3,119	21.02%	1,584	10.67%	86	0.58%	63	0.42%	9	0.06%	6,861	46.23%	14,841
Cheshire	13,242	52.00%	7,835	30.77%	4,090	16.06%	116	0.46%	175	0.69%	9	0.04%	5,407	21.23%	25,467
Coös	8,724	60.08%	4,749	32.71%	941	6.48%	71	0.49%	20	0.14%	15	0.10%	3,975	27.37%	14,520
Grafton	15,273	56.25%	7,282	26.82%	4,279	15.76%	153	0.56%	139	0.51%	25	0.09%	7,991	29.43%	27,151
Hillsborough	68,994	59.84%	31,789	27.57%	13,613	11.81%	581	0.50%	262	0.23%	65	0.06%	37,205	32.27%	115,304
Merrimack	23,584	56.21%	12,083	28.80%	5,894	14.05%	202	0.48%	135	0.32%	62	0.15%	11,501	27.41%	41,960
Rockingham	45,960	57.83%	21,712	27.32%	10,974	13.81%	504	0.63%	269	0.34%	55	0.07%	24,248	30.51%	79,474
Strafford	16,399	50.41%	11,041	33.94%	4,700	14.45%	204	0.63%	160	0.49%	27	0.08%	5,358	16.47%	32,531
Sullivan	7,472	52.85%	4,889	34.58%	1,622	11.47%	79	0.56%	69	0.49%	6	0.04%	2,583	18.27%	14,137
Totals	221,705	57.74%	108,864	28.35%	49,693	12.94%	2,067	0.54%	1,325	0.35%	345	0.09%	112,841	29.39%	383,999

==== Counties flipped from Democratic to Republican ====
- Coös

== Analysis ==
On the county map, Reagan swept all 10 of New Hampshire's counties, the only state in the Northeast to have all of its counties give majorities to Reagan. Reagan broke 60% of the vote in 3 counties.

One notable county result in 1980 that reflected both Reagan's unique popularity in New Hampshire as well as Carter's 15-point drop in support in the state relative to 1976, was the result in rural Coos County in the far north of the state. In 1976, Ford had won the state comfortably while winning 9 out of the state's counties, while Carter had scored one county win with a 51–49 victory in Coös County. Carter's sole county win in 1976 would swing so dramatically as to be one of only 3 of the state's 10 counties to give Reagan more than 60% of the vote in 1980, as Reagan received 60.08% of the vote in Coös County.

Reagan's decisive victory in New Hampshire would make the state 7% more Republican than the national average in the 1980 election.

== See also ==
- Presidency of Ronald Reagan
- United States presidential elections in New Hampshire
