= 1976 New Hampshire Democratic presidential primary =

- February 24, 1976

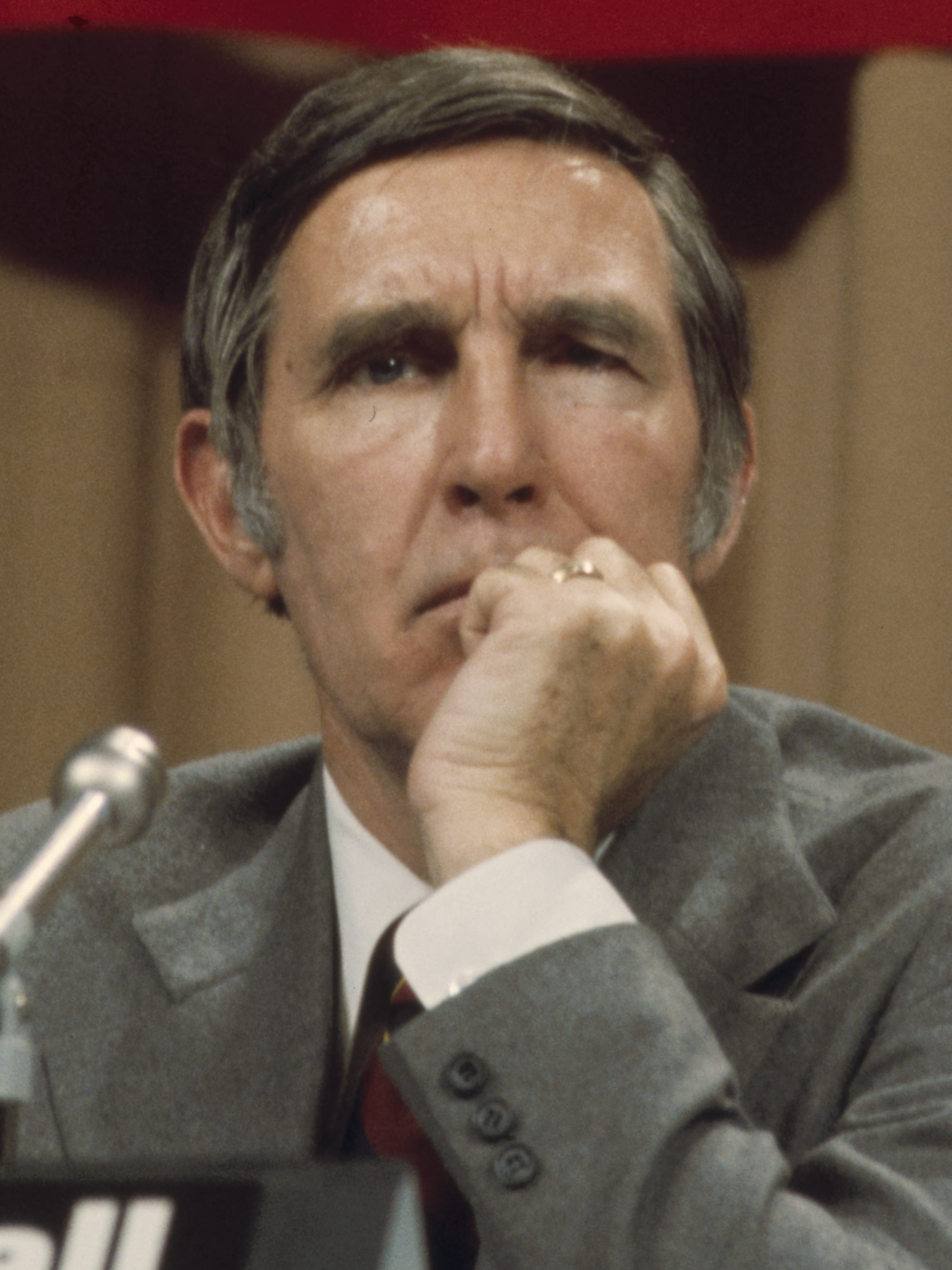

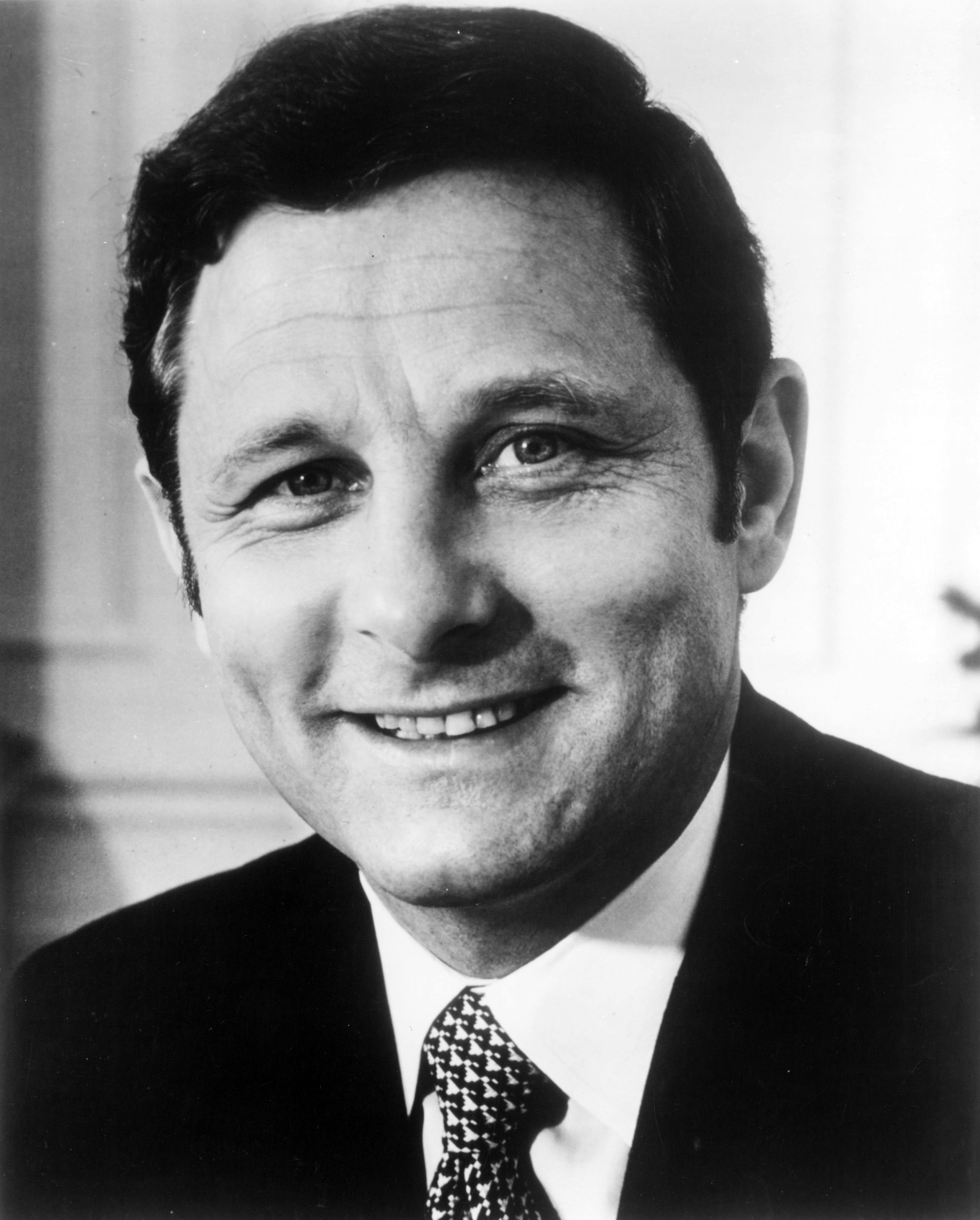

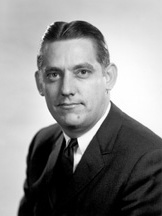

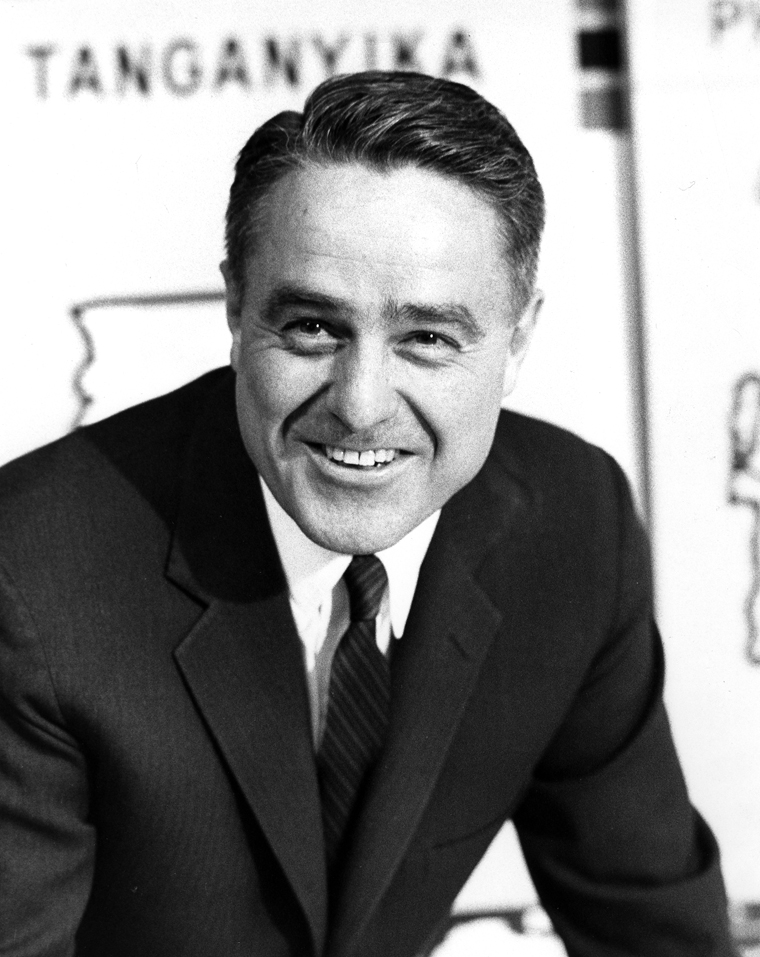

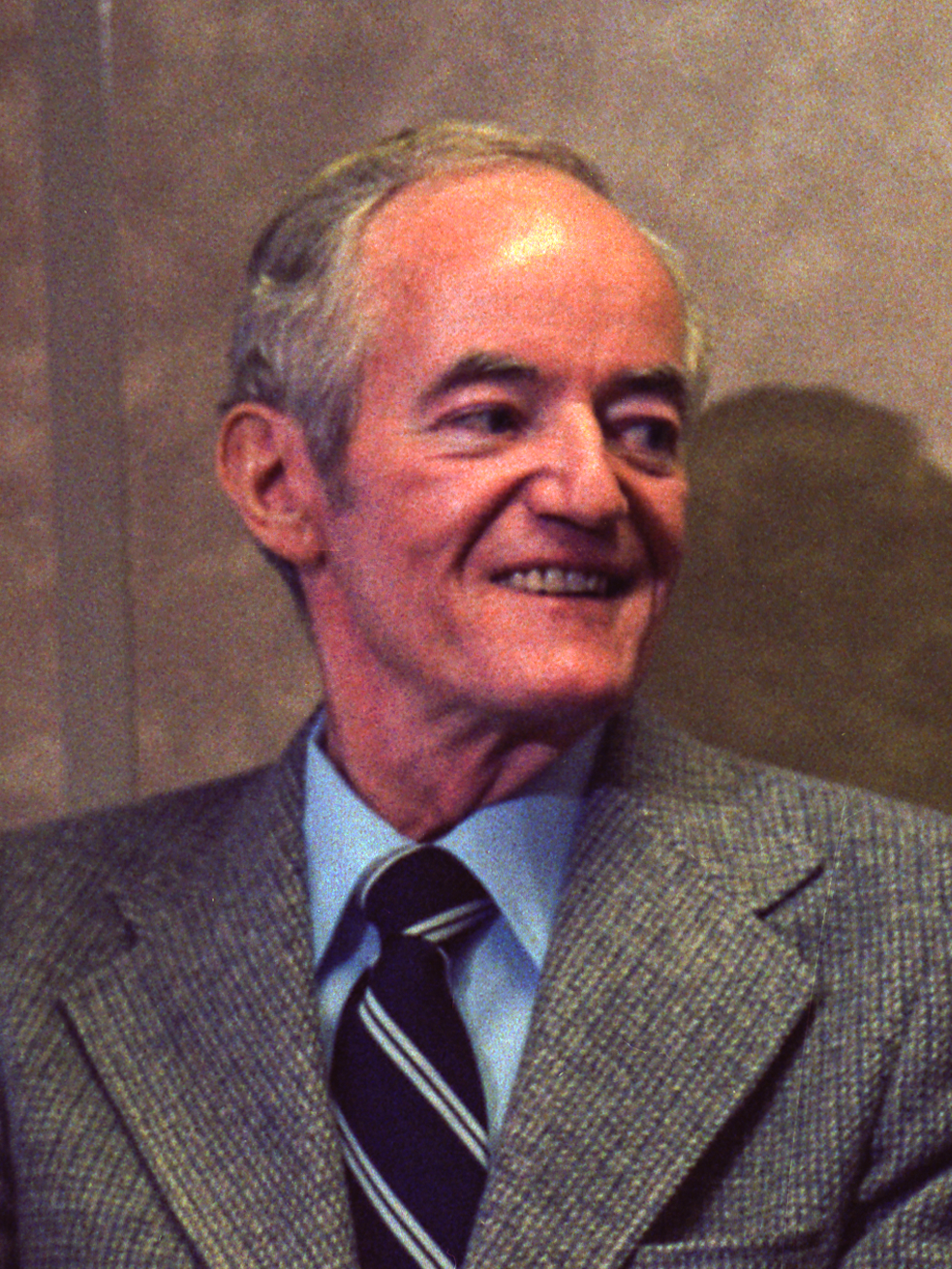
Candidate	Jimmy Carter	Mo Udall	Birch Bayh
Home state	Georgia	Arizona	Indiana
Popular vote	23,373	18,710	12,510
Percentage	28.6%	22.9%	15.3%
Candidate	Fred Harris	Sargent Shriver	Hubert Humphrey (write-in)
Home state	Oklahoma	Maryland	Minnesota
Popular vote	8,863	6,743	4,596
Percentage	10.8%	8.2%	5.6%
- County results Carter: 20-30% 30-40% 40-50% Udall: 20-30% 30-40%

The 1976 New Hampshire Democratic presidential primary was held on February 24, 1976, in New Hampshire as one of the Democratic Party's statewide nomination contests ahead of the 1976 United States presidential election.

== Details ==
The first-in-the-nation primary was won in an upset by political outsider and Governor of Georgia Jimmy Carter, who would later go on to win the nomination and the presidency. Finishing behind Carter in a narrow second place was Arizona Representative Mo Udall, followed by Birch Bayh, Fred Harris, Sargent Shriver, and Hubert Humphrey (who was not actively running).
