= 1976 United States presidential election in New Hampshire =

- November 2, 1976

Nominee	Gerald Ford	Jimmy Carter
Party	Republican	Democratic
Home state	Michigan	Georgia
Running mate	Bob Dole	Walter Mondale
Electoral vote	4	0
Popular vote	185,935	147,635
Percentage	54.75%	43.47%

Ford
40–50%
50–60%
60–70%
70–80%
80–90%
90–100%
Carter
40–50%
50–60%
60–70%
70–80%
President before election
Gerald Ford
Republican
Elected President
Jimmy Carter
Democratic

The 1976 United States presidential election in New Hampshire took place on November 2, 1976, as part of the 1976 United States presidential election, which was held throughout all 50 states and D.C. Voters chose four representatives, or electors to the Electoral College, who voted for president and vice president.

New Hampshire was won by the Republican nominees, incumbent President Gerald Ford of Michigan and his running mate Senator Bob Dole of Kansas. Ford and Dole defeated the Democratic nominees, Governor Jimmy Carter of Georgia and his running mate Senator Walter Mondale of Minnesota.

Ford took 54.75% of the vote to Carter's 43.47%, a margin of 11.28%. Anti-war former Democratic Senator Eugene McCarthy of Minnesota, running as an independent presidential candidate, came in a distant third, with 1.21%. New Hampshire in this era normally leaned Republican, having not gone Democratic since the nationwide Democratic landslide of 1964. The Northern moderate Republican Ford easily triumphed in New Hampshire over the Southern Democrat Jimmy Carter.

On the county map, Ford won nine of New Hampshire's ten counties, with only rural Coos County in the far north of the state giving a 51-49 majority to Carter. In a sign of the state's Republican trend that would occur in the 1970s and 1980s, even while narrowly losing the national race, Ford won two of the state's traditional New Deal Democratic counties, with a majority win in Hillsborough County and a plurality win in Strafford County. Since 1932, both of these counties, along with Coos County, had gone Democratic in every close presidential election or Democratic victory, voting every time for Franklin D. Roosevelt, Harry S. Truman, John F. Kennedy, Lyndon B. Johnson, and Hubert H. Humphrey. Carter became the first Democrat to win the White House without carrying Hillsborough County and Strafford County since Grover Cleveland in 1892.

Ford's decisive victory in New Hampshire, while narrowly losing the national race, would make the state over 13% more Republican than the national average in the 1976 election. As of the 2024 presidential election, this is the last time that a Democrat would win a presidential election without carrying New Hampshire, and the last presidential election until 2016 when the winner of Coös County did not also carry the state as well. The state would not vote for the loser of the popular vote until 2000, and for a losing candidate again until 2004.

== Results ==
1976 United States presidential election in New Hampshire
Party	Candidate	Votes	Percentage	Electoral votes
Republican	Gerald Ford (incumbent)	185,935	54.75%	4
Democratic	Jimmy Carter	147,635	43.47%	0
McCarthy '76	Eugene McCarthy	4,095	1.21%	0
Libertarian	Roger MacBride	936	0.28%	0
Write-ins	Write-ins	604	0.18%	0
U.S. Labor	Lyndon LaRouche	186	0.05%	0
Socialist Workers	Peter Camejo	161	0.05%	0
Socialist Labor	Julius Levin	66	0.02%	0
Totals		339,618	100.00%	4
Voter Turnout (Voting age/Registered)				57%/71%

=== Results by county ===
County	Gerald Ford Republican		Jimmy Carter Democratic		Eugene McCarthy McCarthy ‘76		Various candidates Other parties		Margin		Total votes cast
County	#	%	#	%	#	%	#	%	#	%	Total votes cast
Belknap	9,876	60.78%	6,143	37.81%	120	0.74%	110	0.68%	3,733	22.97%	16,249
Carroll	8,561	70.18%	3,374	27.66%	169	1.39%	94	0.77%	5,187	42.52%	12,198
Cheshire	12,554	53.87%	10,388	44.57%	260	1.12%	103	0.44%	2,166	9.30%	23,305
Coös	7,094	48.46%	7,385	50.45%	92	0.63%	67	0.46%	-291	-1.99%	14,638
Grafton	14,430	60.34%	8,996	37.62%	369	1.54%	119	0.50%	5,434	22.72%	23,914
Hillsborough	53,581	53.11%	45,544	45.15%	1,168	1.16%	587	0.58%	8,037	7.96%	100,880
Merrimack	21,853	58.62%	14,865	39.87%	377	1.01%	187	0.50%	6,988	18.75%	37,282
Rockingham	36,738	53.92%	30,051	44.11%	903	1.33%	438	0.64%	6,687	9.81%	68,130
Strafford	14,569	49.61%	14,566	49.60%	50	0.17%	180	0.61%	3	0.01%	29,365
Sullivan	6,679	50.57%	6,323	47.88%	137	1.04%	68	0.51%	356	2.69%	13,207
Total	185,935	54.75%	147,635	43.47%	4,095	1.21%	1,953	0.58%	38,300	11.28%	339,618

==== Counties that flipped from Republican to Democratic ====
- Coos

== See also ==
- Presidency of Jimmy Carter
- United States presidential elections in New Hampshire
