= New Hampshire presidential primary =

U.S. presidential nomination election

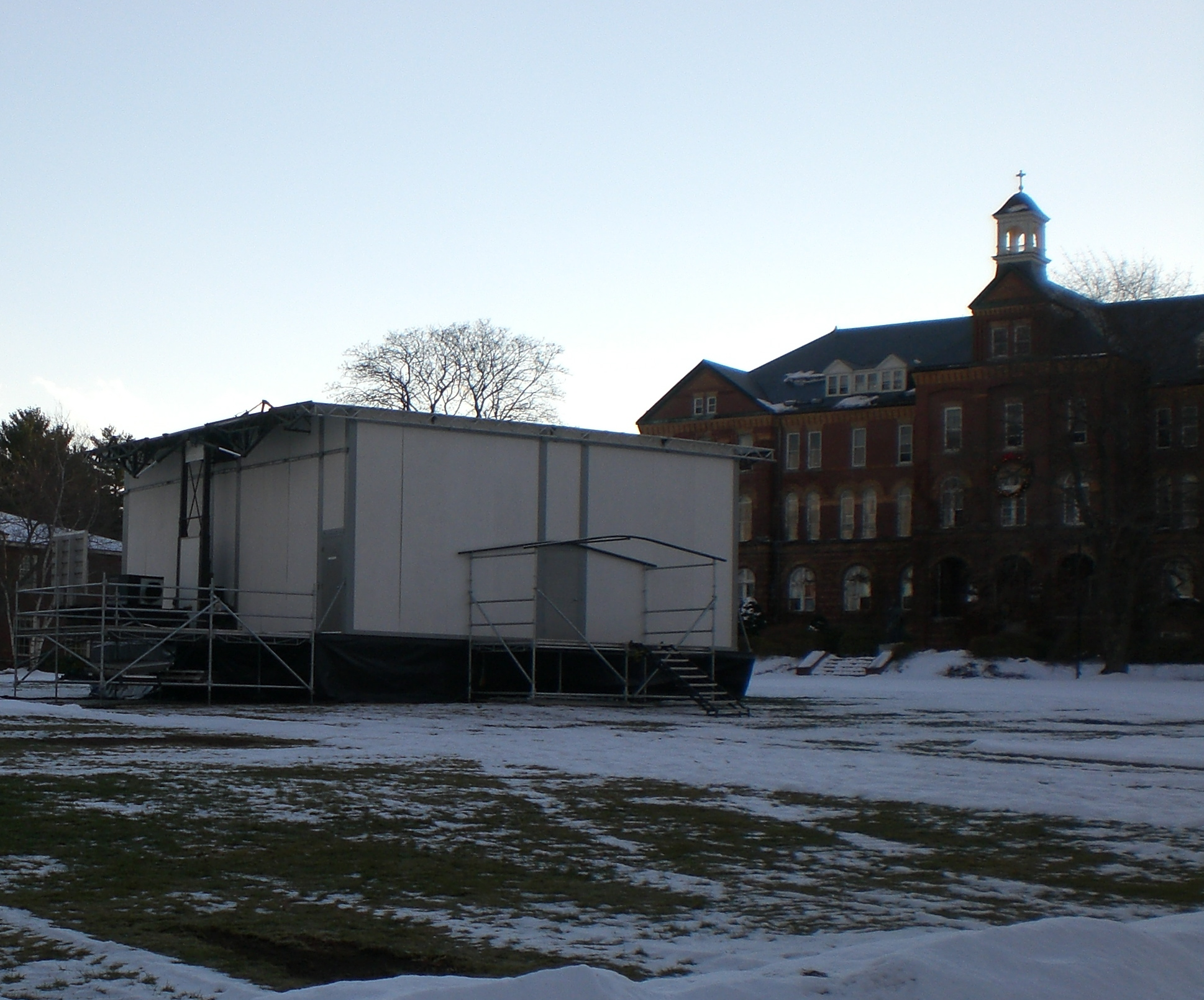
Saint Anselm College Quad with the "Fox-Box", from which the Fox News network reported live during the 2004 and 2008 New Hampshire primary

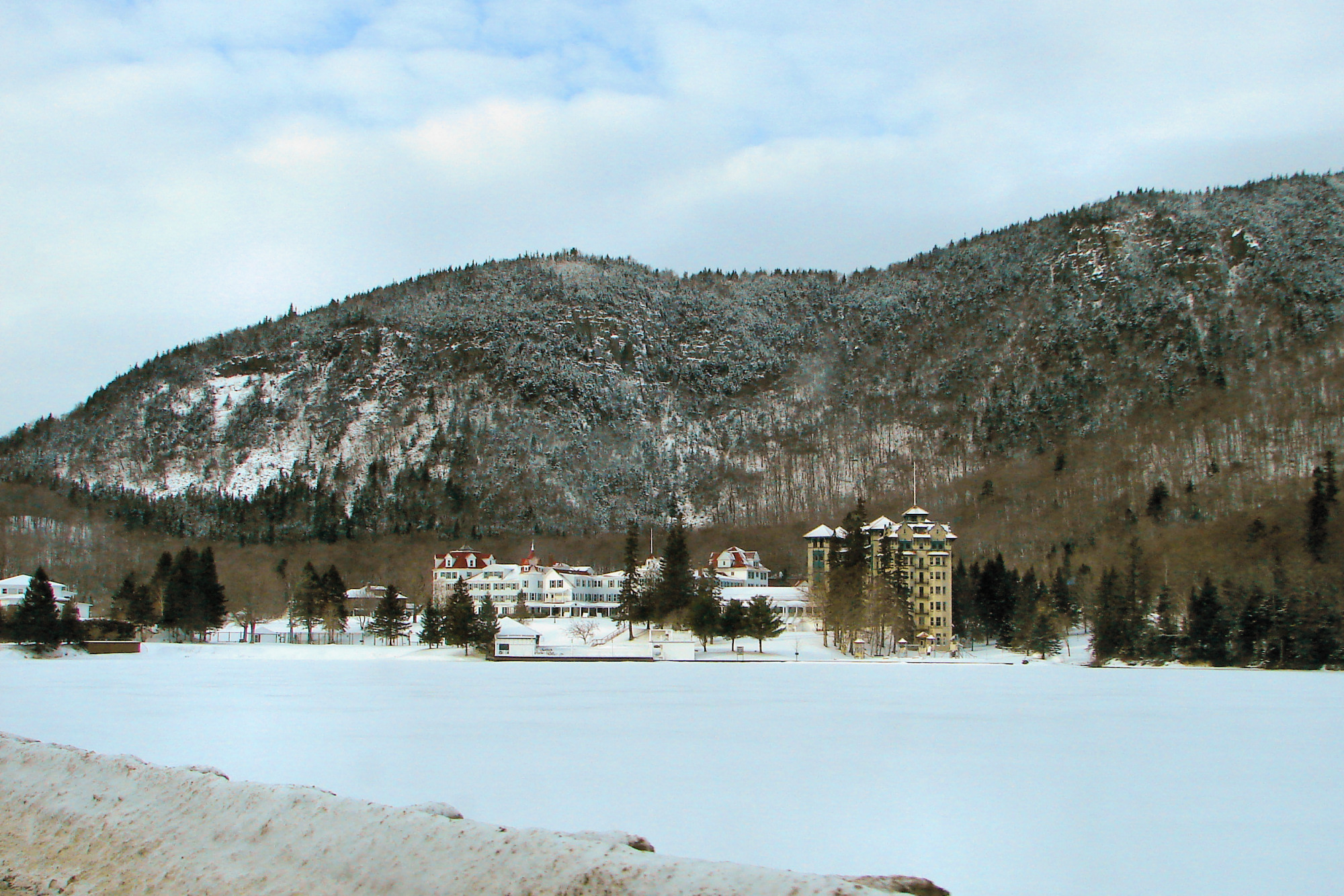
The Balsams Grand Resort Hotel in Dixville Notch, one of the sites of the first "midnight vote" in the New Hampshire primary

The New Hampshire presidential primary is the first in a series of nationwide party primary elections and the second party contest, the first being the Iowa caucuses, held in the United States every four years as part of the process of choosing the delegates to the Democratic and Republican national conventions which choose the party nominees for the presidential elections to be held in November. Although only a few delegates are chosen in the New Hampshire primary, its real importance comes from the massive media coverage it receives, along with the first caucus in Iowa.

Spurred by the events of the 1968 election, reforms that began with the 1972 election elevated the two states' importance to the overall election, and began to receive as much media attention as all of the other state contests combined. An upset victory by an underdog candidate, or a weak showing by a front-runner can change the course of the primaries, as happened in 1952, 1968, and 2008 for the Democrats, and in 1980 for the Republicans.

Since 1952, the primary has been a major testing ground for candidates for both the Republican and Democratic nominations. Candidates who do poorly frequently drop out, while lesser-known, underfunded candidates who excel in New Hampshire can become serious contenders, garnering large amounts of media attention and campaign funding.

The New Hampshire primary is a semi-open primary: unaffiliated voters (those registered without party affiliation) may vote in either party's primary. Voters registered with one party cannot "cross vote" to vote in another party's primary.

== "First primary" status and efforts to change ==
New Hampshire state law provides: "The presidential primary election shall be held on the second Tuesday in March or on a date selected by the secretary of state which is 7 days or more immediately preceding the date on which any other state shall hold a similar election, whichever is earlier." (Note: The second Tuesday in March is also the traditional day when New Hampshire towns have held their town meeting.) New Hampshire has closely guarded its "first primary in the nation" status through this provision. The state has held the first primary in each presidential campaign since 1920.

The Iowa caucuses, which began in 1972 for Democrats and 1976 for Republicans, occur earlier than the New Hampshire primary. Iowa's contest is not considered to be "a similar election" because the caucuses do not involve actual balloting.

New Hampshire's status as the first in the nation has been considered controversial by those who claim the ethnic makeup of the state is not diverse enough. Efforts to alter New Hampshire's first-in-the-nation primary status have periodically occurred. In 2007, different states attempted to leapfrog other states by scheduling earlier primaries and caucuses for the 2008 presidential race. Florida, Michigan, Nevada and South Carolina all moved their nominating contests up. New Hampshire ultimately retained its first-primary status, holding its primary on January 8, 2008, the earliest ever date.

In 2023, the Democratic National Committee approved a calendar that would make New Hampshire the second Democratic primary to be held in 2024. Under the DNC calendar, the South Carolina primary would be held first on February 3, followed by both the New Hampshire primary and Nevada caucuses on February 6. New Hampshire officials of both parties opposed the move, and vowed to go forward with a first-in-the-nation primary, even if it triggered a loss of its convention delegates as a penalty for breaching the party calendar. The New Hampshire Democratic Party later ran a firehouse primary before their official delegate selection meeting on April 27 to gain back their 25 delegates, in which a few dozens of registered party members from the state party committee voted and Joe Biden was the only candidate on the ballot. The event was considered a token process to fulfill rules and largely not taken serious even by participants, but it was seen as an important decision in the context of the subsequent primary calendar for 2028. Accordingly, all delegates were allowed to be seated at the national convention following a vote by the DNC Rules and Bylaw Committee on April 30.

== Mechanics of the primary ==
=== Voter eligibility ===
The New Hampshire primary is a semi-open primary: unaffiliated voters (those registered without party affiliation) may vote in either party's primary. Votes registered with one party cannot "cross vote" to vote in another party's primary.

=== Candidate and party eligibility ===
Under state law, officially recognized parties may hold a state-sanctioned primary. To receive official party status, a party's candidate must receive at least 4% of the votes cast for governor or U.S. senator in the most recent general election in New Hampshire. Currently, only Democrats and Republicans meet this criterion.

New Hampshire has a low barrier to ballot access. Any person may run for president by (1) paying a $1,000 filing fee or collecting the signatures of 10 registered voters in each New Hampshire county and (2) completing a declaration of candidacy form that declares, under penalty of perjury, that the candidate meets the constitutional requirement for the presidency, being at least 35 years old, a natural-born citizen status, and a U.S. resident for at least 14 years. Candidates must affirm that they are a registered member of the party for the nomination they seek.

The record number of candidates was 62, in the 1992 primary. In the 2016 New Hampshire primary, 58 candidates ran. Many candidates who appear on the ballot are obscure or fringe, and some are perennial candidates. Saint Anselm College runs a Lesser-Known Candidates Forum every four years.

=== Balloting ===
The primary is conducted by secret ballot. Voters mark their selection on paper ballots, which are tabulated by hand and optical scan.

=== Dixville Notch and other "midnight voting" towns ===
The communities of Dixville Notch, Hart's Location, and Millsfield traditionally participate in the New Hampshire midnight voting, in which they open their polling places at midnight. In particular, the polling place inside the ballroom of The Balsams Grand Resort Hotel in Dixville Notch opens at midnight, usually in front of a crowd of journalists, where the village's handful of voters cast their ballots before the polls close about less than ten minutes later. This has led many presidential candidates to visit the area before the New Hampshire primary in hopes of securing an early-morning boost.

== Significance ==
There is consensus among scholars and pundits that the New Hampshire primary, because of the timing and the vast media attention, can have a great impact and may even make, break or revive a candidate. Controlling for other factors statistically, a win in New Hampshire increases a candidate's share of the final primary count in all states by 27 percentage points.

Since 1977, New Hampshire has fought hard to keep its timing as the first primary, while Iowa has the first caucus a few days sooner. State law requires that its primary must be the first in the nation. It has been the first by tradition since 1920. As a result, the state has moved its primary earlier in the year to remain the first.

The primary was held on the following dates: 1952–1968, the second Tuesday in March. 1972, the first Tuesday in March. 1976–1984, the fourth Tuesday in February. 1988–1996, the third Tuesday in February. 2000, the first Tuesday in February (February 1). 2004, the fourth Tuesday in January (January 27). The shifts have been to compete with changing primary dates in other states. The primary dates for 2008 (January 8) and 2012 (January 10) continued the trend – they were held the second Tuesday in January, in both years.

In defense of their primary, voters of New Hampshire have tended to downplay the importance of the Iowa caucus. "The people of Iowa pick corn, the people of New Hampshire pick presidents," said then-Governor John H. Sununu in 1988.

Recently, media expectations for the New Hampshire primary have come to be almost as important as the results themselves. Meeting or beating expectations can provide a candidate with national attention, often leading to an infusion of donations to a campaign that has spent most of its reserves. For example, in 1992, Bill Clinton, although he did not win, did surprisingly well, with his team dubbing him the "Comeback Kid". The extra media attention helped his campaign's visibility in later primaries.

The most recent presidential election winner to win the New Hampshire primary was Donald Trump in 2024. The three presidents before him (Bill Clinton, George W. Bush and Barack Obama) finished second in the New Hampshire primary before later being elected to the presidency. The previous four presidents before that, won the New Hampshire primary.

== History ==
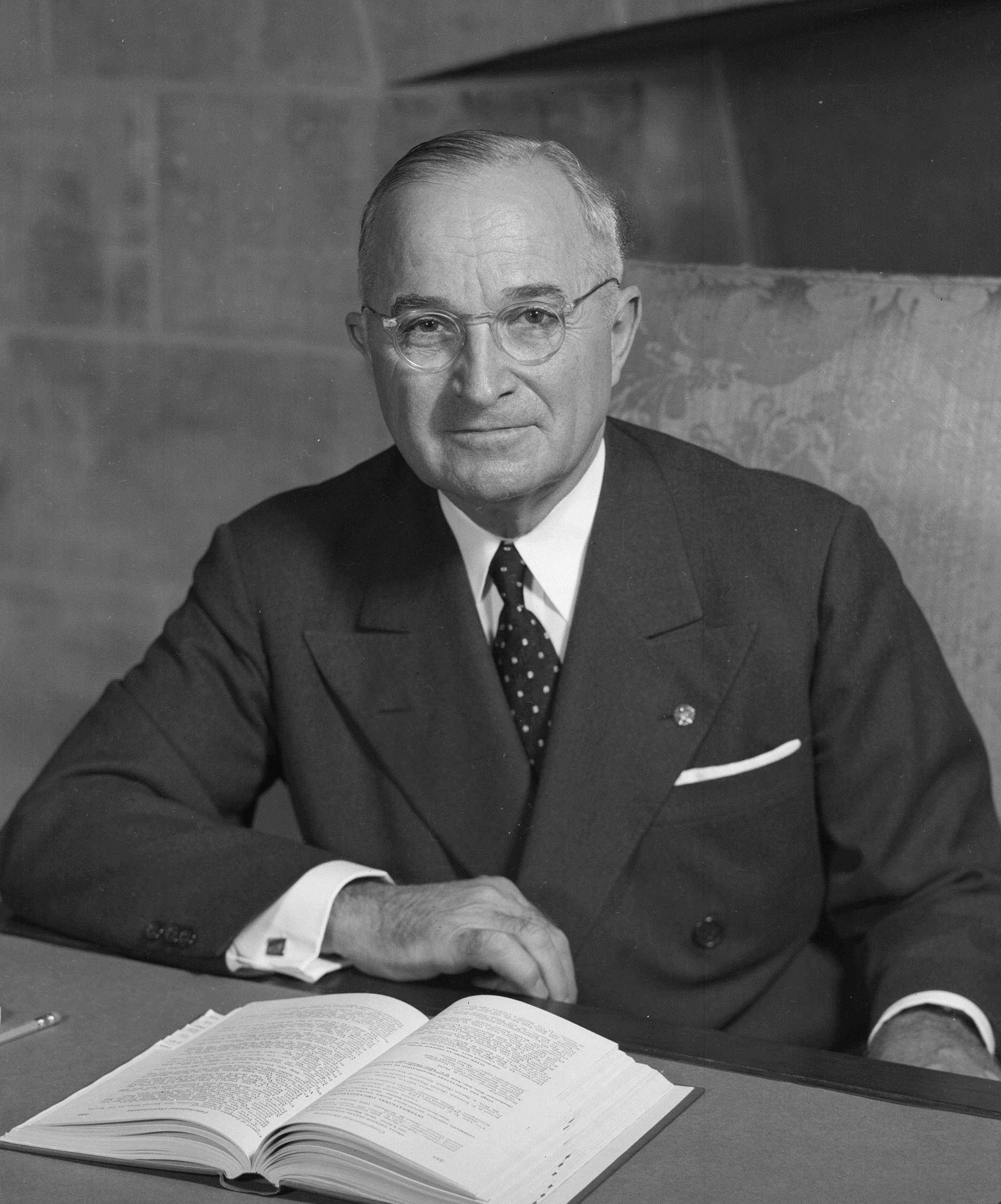
Harry S. Truman remains the only incumbent president to lose the New Hampshire primary.

New Hampshire has held a presidential primary since 1916 and started the tradition of being the first presidential primary in the United States starting in 1920. Until 1948, the New Hampshire primary, like most of the small number of other primaries in the country, listed only the names of local citizens who wanted to be delegates to the state convention. In 1948, Richard F. Upton, speaker of the New Hampshire House of Representatives decided to make the primary "more interesting and meaningful…so there would be a greater turnout at the polls." The state legislature passed a law allowing citizens to vote directly for the presidential candidates. Any candidate could get on the ballot if he submitted fifty supporting petitions from each of the two congressional districts. Voters could choose delegates who were explicitly pledged to a particular candidate.

New Hampshire did not begin to assume its current importance until 1952. In that year, Dwight D. Eisenhower demonstrated his broad voter appeal by defeating Robert A. Taft, "Mr. Republican", who had been favored for the nomination, and Estes Kefauver defeated incumbent President Harry S. Truman, leading Truman to abandon his campaign for a second term of his own. The other president to be forced out of the running for re-election by New Hampshire voters was Lyndon B. Johnson, who, as a write-in candidate, managed only a 49–42 percent victory over Eugene McCarthy in 1968, and won fewer delegates than McCarthy, and consequently withdrew from the race.

The winner in New Hampshire has not always won their party's nomination, as demonstrated by Republicans Leonard Wood in 1920, Harold Stassen in 1948, Henry Cabot Lodge Jr. as a write-in candidate in 1964, Pat Buchanan in 1996, and John McCain in 2000, and Democrats Estes Kefauver in 1952 and 1956, Paul Tsongas in 1992, Hillary Clinton in 2008, and Bernie Sanders in 2016 and 2020.

From 1952 to 1988, the person elected president had always carried the primary. Bill Clinton broke the pattern in 1992, as did George W. Bush in 2000, Barack Obama in 2008, and Joe Biden in 2020. In 1992, Clinton lost to Paul Tsongas in New Hampshire. In 2000, Bush lost to John McCain in New Hampshire. In 2008, Obama lost to Hillary Clinton. In 2020, Biden lost to Bernie Sanders.

=== 1968 ===
In November 1967, Eugene McCarthy declared, "there comes a time when an honorable man simply has to raise the flag" and entered the New Hampshire Democratic primary. On March 12, 1968, McCarthy, who was the only candidate on the ballot, came within 7 percentage points of defeating President Lyndon B. Johnson, a write-in candidate who was technically still exploring his candidacy and had not bothered to file. Just a few days later, on March 16, 1968, Robert F. Kennedy entered the race for president. Johnson subsequently withdrew from the race with this Shermanesque statement: "I shall not seek, and I will not accept, the nomination of my party for another term as your president."

One minor candidate in the Republican primary was William W. Evans Jr., a former New Jersey State Assemblyman, who received just 151 votes statewide.

The 1968 New Hampshire Democratic primary was one of the crucial events in the politics of that landmark year in United States history. Senator Eugene McCarthy began his campaign with a poem that he wrote in imitation of the poet Robert Lowell, "Are you running with me Jesus":

I'm not matching my stride
With Billy Graham's by the Clyde
I'm not going for distance
With the Senator's persistence
I'm not trying to win a race
even at George Romney's pace.
I'm an existential runner,
Indifferent to space
I'm running here in place ...
Are you with me Jesus?

=== 1980 ===
George H. W. Bush emerged as the front-runner of the 1980 Republican presidential primary after his upset Iowa caucus victory over Ronald Reagan. Bush and Reagan became the two leading candidates in the primaries over the other four candidates. With the other candidates in single digits, the Nashua Telegraph offered to host a debate between Reagan and Bush. Worried that a newspaper-sponsored debate might violate electoral regulations, Reagan arranged to fund the event with his own campaign money, inviting the other candidates to participate at short notice.

The Bush camp did not learn of Reagan's decision to include the other candidates until the debate was due to begin. Bush refused to participate, which led to an impasse on the stage. As Reagan attempted to explain his decision, Jon Breen, the editor of the Nashua Telegraph and debate moderator, ordered Bob Malloy, the volume operator, to mute Reagan's microphone. When Malloy refused, Breen repeated his order. A visibly angry Reagan responded, "I am paying for this microphone, Mr. Green!" [sic], referring to the editor and debate moderator Jon Breen.

Eventually the other candidates agreed to leave, and the debate proceeded between Reagan and Bush. Reagan's quote was often repeated as "I paid for this microphone!" and dominated news coverage of the event. Reagan sailed to an easy win in New Hampshire. Reagan eventually secured the nomination, and selected Bush as his running mate. The two won the general election.

=== 1992 ===
Bill Clinton was able to declare himself the "Comeback Kid" after posting a surprise second-place finish behind Paul Tsongas in the Democratic primary. Clinton's support had been flagging for weeks since being hit by allegations of infidelity with actress Gennifer Flowers. On the Republican side, Pat Buchanan garnered an unexpected 37% showing behind incumbent President George H. W. Bush. Buchanan did not win a single state, but revealed some doubts about the moderate president among conservative voters.

=== 2000 ===
George W. Bush's campaign, which for months had dominated in polling, money and endorsements on the Republican side, suffered a blow when John McCain, who had been surging in late polls, ended up beating the governor in New Hampshire by more than 18 points. The result forecast a tough two-man race for the GOP nomination, which carried on until Super Tuesday in March. Al Gore helped himself with a narrow win in the Democratic primary, which somewhat assuaged his supporters' concerns about Bill Bradley's insurgent campaign.

=== 2004 ===
Senator John Kerry secured a decisive victory with 35% of the vote, 10 percentage points more than second-place finisher Howard Dean.

=== 2008 ===
Hillary Clinton managed an upset win over Barack Obama in New Hampshire, despite polls showing her as much as 13 points behind in the run-up to the vote. The win helped Clinton get back some of the momentum she lost the week before when Obama carried the Iowa caucuses—though Obama eventually won the Democratic nomination. John McCain won the Republican primary, sparking an unexpected comeback for the senator whose long-shot campaign had been written off as a lost cause months before. He went on to win the GOP nomination.

=== 2016 ===
Bernie Sanders defeated Hillary Clinton by 22 percentage points. Sanders amassed 152,193 votes in total, earning him 15 delegates, while Clinton managed 95,252 votes with 9 delegates. Together with Donald Trump's double-digit win in the GOP race, the primary results revealed voter frustrations with mainstream "establishment" politicians.

=== 2020 ===
Bernie Sanders narrowly placed first in the Democratic primary once again, edging out former Mayor of South Bend Pete Buttigieg with 76,384 votes to 72,454. Incumbent President Donald Trump won an overwhelming victory in the Republican primary with 129,734 votes, beating former Governor of Massachusetts Bill Weld by over 75 percentage points and receiving the most votes in the New Hampshire primary for an incumbent candidate in U.S. history, breaking Bill Clinton's 1996 record of 76,797.

=== 2024 ===
President Joe Biden was a write-in candidate due to the Democratic primary scheduling controversy; he won the Democratic race with over 64 percent of the vote. Donald Trump won the Republican primary with about 54 percent of the vote, beating Nikki Haley's approximate 43 percent.

== Democratic results ==
Notes: An asterisk indicates a write-in candidate. Candidates in bold won the primary. Candidates in italics were incumbent presidents.

- 1916: Six of the eight delegates elected were pledged to President Woodrow Wilson, the other two were unpledged
- 1920: Of the eight delegates elected three were pledged to former U.S. Food Administrator Herbert Hoover; the rest were unpledged
- 1924: All delegate candidates ran unpledged
- 1928: All delegate candidates ran unpledged
- 1932: All delegates and alternates elected were pledged to Governor Franklin D. Roosevelt
- 1936: All delegates and alternates elected were pledged to President Roosevelt
- 1940: All delegates and alternates were pledged to President Roosevelt
- 1944: All delegates elected were pledged to President Franklin D. Roosevelt
- 1948: All delegates elected (except for one alternate) were pledged to President Harry S. Truman
- 1952 (March 11): **Estes Kefauver** (55%), Harry S. Truman (44%), and others (1%)
- 1956 (March 13): **Estes Kefauver** (85%) and Adlai Stevenson (15%)
- 1960 (March 8): **John F. Kennedy** (85%), Paul C. Fisher (13%), and others (2%)
- 1964 (March 10): **Lyndon B. Johnson** (95%), Robert F. Kennedy (2%) and others (3%)
- 1968 (March 12): **Lyndon B. Johnson*** (50%), Eugene McCarthy (42%), Richard Nixon (5%), and others (3%)
- 1972 (March 7): **Edmund Muskie** (46%), George McGovern (37%), Sam Yorty (6%), Wilbur Mills (4%), Vance Hartke (3%), and others (4%)
- 1976 (February 24): **Jimmy Carter** (29%), Mo Udall (23%), Birch Bayh (15%), Fred R. Harris (11%), Sargent Shriver (8%), and others (14%)
- 1980 (February 26): **Jimmy Carter** (48%), Ted Kennedy (38%), Jerry Brown (10%), and others (4%)
- 1984 (February 28): **Gary Hart** (39%), Walter Mondale (29%), John Glenn (12%), Jesse Jackson (6%), George McGovern (5%), Ronald Reagan (5%), and Fritz Hollings (4%)
- 1988 (February 16): **Michael Dukakis** (36%), Dick Gephardt (20%), Paul Simon (17%), Jesse Jackson (8%), Al Gore (7%), Bruce Babbitt (5%), Gary Hart (4%), and others (3%)
- 1992 (February 18): **Paul Tsongas** (33%), Bill Clinton (25%), Bob Kerrey (11%), Tom Harkin (10%), Jerry Brown (8%), and others (13%)
- 1996 (February 20): **Bill Clinton** (84%), Pat Buchanan* (4%), and others (12%)
- 2000 (February 1): **Al Gore** (50%), Bill Bradley (46%), and others (4%)
- 2004 (January 27): **John Kerry** (38%), Howard Dean (26%), Wesley K. Clark (12%), John Edwards (12%), Joseph I. Lieberman (9%), Dennis J. Kucinich (1%), and others (2%)
- 2008 (January 8): **Hillary Clinton** (39%), Barack Obama (36%), John Edwards (17%), Bill Richardson (5%), Dennis Kucinich (1%), and others (2%)
- 2012 (January 10): **Barack Obama** (81%) and others (19%)
- 2016 (February 9): **Bernie Sanders** (60%), Hillary Clinton (38%), and others (2%)
- 2020 (February 11): **Bernie Sanders** (26%), Pete Buttigieg (24%), Amy Klobuchar (20%), Elizabeth Warren (9%), Joe Biden (8%), Tom Steyer (4%), Tulsi Gabbard (3%), Andrew Yang (3%), and others (3%)
- 2024 (January 23): **Joe Biden*** (64%), Dean Phillips (19%), and others (7%)

== Republican results ==
Notes: An asterisk indicates a write-in candidate. Candidates in bold won the primary. Candidates in italics were incumbent presidents.

- 1916: Of the eight delegates elected only one was formally pledged (to former President Theodore Roosevelt)
- 1920: All eight elected delegates were pledged to General Leonard Wood; one of the defeated delegates had been pledged to Governor Hiram Johnson
- 1924: All delegate candidates ran unpledged
- 1928: All delegate candidates ran unpledged
- 1932: All delegates and alternates elected were pledged to President Herbert Hoover
- 1936: All delegates and alternates were unpledged
- 1940: All eight delegates elected (and all alternates) were unpledged
- 1944: Two of the 11 delegates elected were pledged to Governor Thomas E. Dewey, the rest were unpledged
- 1948: Of the eight delegates elected, two were pledged to Governor Dewey, the remainder were unpledged; four of the alternate delegates were also pledged to Governor Dewey
- 1952 (March 11): **Dwight D. Eisenhower** (56%), Robert A. Taft (31%), Harold E. Stassen (8%), Douglas MacArthur (4%), and others (1%)
- 1956 (March 13): **Dwight D. Eisenhower** (94%) and others (6%). Of the more than 57,000 GOP votes cast, only 600 were not for Eisenhower.
- 1960 (March 8): **Richard Nixon** (89%), Nelson Rockefeller (4%), and others (7%)
- 1964 (March 10): **Henry Cabot Lodge Jr.*** (36%), Barry Goldwater (22%), Nelson Rockefeller (22%), Richard Nixon (17%), and others (3%)
- 1968 (March 12): **Richard Nixon** (78%), Nelson Rockefeller (11%), Eugene McCarthy (5%), Lyndon B. Johnson (2%), George Romney (2%), and others (2%)
- 1972 (March 7): **Richard Nixon** (68%), Pete McCloskey (20%), John M. Ashbrook (10%), and others (2%)
- 1976 (February 24): **Gerald Ford** (50%), Ronald Reagan (49%), and others (1%)
- 1980 (February 26): **Ronald Reagan** (50%), George H. W. Bush (23%), Howard Baker (13%), John B. Anderson (10%), Phil Crane (2%), and John Connally (2%)
- 1984 (February 28): **Ronald Reagan** (86%), Gary Hart (5%), Harold Stassen (2%), and others (7%)
- 1988 (February 16): **George H. W. Bush** (38%), Bob Dole (28%), Jack Kemp (13%), Pierre S. "Pete" du Pont IV (10%), Pat Robertson (9%), and others (2%)
- 1992 (February 18): **George H. W. Bush** (53%), Pat Buchanan (38%), and others (9%)
- 1996 (February 20): **Pat Buchanan** (27%), Bob Dole (26%), Lamar Alexander (23%), Steve Forbes Jr. (12%), Richard G. "Dick" Lugar (5%), Alan Keyes (3%), Morry Taylor (1%), and others (3%)
- 2000 (February 1): **John McCain** (49%), George W. Bush (30%), Steve Forbes Jr. (13%), Alan Keyes (6%), and others (2%)
- 2004 (January 27): **George W. Bush** (81%) and others (19%)
- 2008 (January 8): **John McCain** (37%), Mitt Romney (32%), Mike Huckabee (11%), Rudy Giuliani (8%), Ron Paul (8%), Fred Thompson (1%), and others (3%)
- 2012 (January 10): **Mitt Romney** (39%), Ron Paul (23%), Jon Huntsman Jr. (17%), Rick Santorum (9%), Newt Gingrich (9%), and others (3%)
- 2016 (February 9): **Donald Trump** (35%), John Kasich (16%), Ted Cruz (12%), Jeb Bush (11%), Marco Rubio (11%), Chris Christie (7%), Carly Fiorina (4%), Ben Carson (2%), and others (2%)
- 2020 (February 11): **Donald Trump** (86%), Bill Weld (9%), and others (5%)
- 2024 (January 23): **Donald Trump** (54%), Nikki Haley (43%)

== Libertarian results ==
Primary date	Winner	Runners-Up
February 18, 1992	Former Alaska state representative Andre Marrou (100%)	No other candidate received a vote
February 26, 1996	Investment analyst Harry Browne (35.00%)	Tax protester Irwin Schiff (18.33%)

== Vice-presidential results ==
A vice-presidential preference primary was also formerly held at the New Hampshire primary. New Hampshire State Senator Jack Barnes, who won the 2008 Republican contest, co-sponsored a bill in 2009 to eliminate the vice-presidential preference ballot. The bill passed both houses of the state legislature, and took effect in 2012.

The only time a non-incumbent won the vice-presidential primary and then went on to be formally nominated by his or her party was in 2004, when Democratic U.S. Senator John Edwards won as a write-in candidate. Edwards, who was running for President at the time, did not actively solicit vice-presidential votes.

In 1968, the sitting Vice President Hubert Humphrey won the Democratic vice-presidential primary, and then later won the Presidential nomination after the sitting President Lyndon B. Johnson dropped out of the race.

The following candidates received the greatest number of votes at each election.

Year	Date	Republican	Democratic	Libertarian
1952	March 11	Styles Bridges*	Estes Kefauver*	
1956	March 13	Richard Nixon*	Adlai Stevenson II*	
1960	March 8	Wesley Powell*	Wesley Powell*	
1964	March 10	Richard Nixon*	Robert F. Kennedy*	
1968	March 12	Austin Burton	Hubert Humphrey*	
1972	March 7	Spiro Agnew*	Jorge Almeyda*	
1976	February 24	Wallace J.S. Johnson	Auburn Lee Packwood	
1980	February 26	Jesse A. Helms	Walter Mondale*	
1984	February 28	George H. W. Bush*	Gerald Willis	
1988	February 16	Wayne Green	David Duke	
1992	February 18	Herb Clark Jr.	Endicott Peabody	Nancy Lord*
1996	February 20	Colin Powell*	Al Gore*	Irwin Schiff*
2000	February 1	William Bryk	Wladislav D. Kubiak	
2004	January 27	Dick Cheney*	John Edwards*	
2008	January 8	John Barnes Jr.	Raymond Stebbins	

* – write-in candidate

Sources: New Hampshire Department of State, New Hampshire Political Library

== See also ==
- United States presidential primary
- United States presidential election
- United States presidential election debates
- United States presidential nominating convention
- Electoral College (United States)

Early votes:

- Ames Straw Poll, Iowa, on a Saturday in August prior to the election year, since 1979
- Iowa caucuses, first official election-year event since 1972

Reform plans:

- United States presidential primary reform proposals
- Graduated Random Presidential Primary System
- Delaware Plan
- Rotating Regional Primary System
- Interregional Primary Plan
- National Primary
