= Australian Young Labor =

Youth wing of the Australian Labor Party

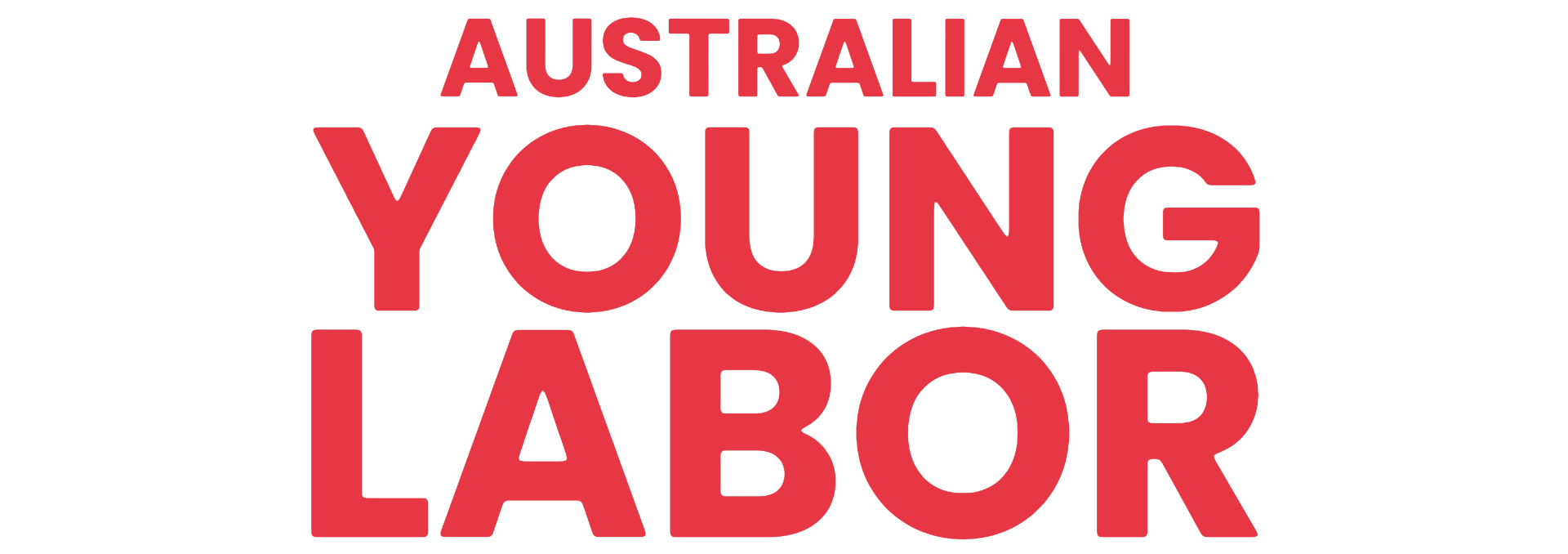
- President: Chris Hancock
- National Secretary: Louis Gordon
- Founded: Earliest state branch: 1920; 106 years ago; National branch: 1971; 55 years ago
- Headquarters: Canberra, Australian Capital Territory
- Ideology: Social democracy Democratic socialism
- Position: Centre-left
- Colours: Red
- Mother party: Australian Labor Party

Australian Young Labor (AYL), or simply Young Labor, is the youth wing of the Australian Labor Party (ALP) and the principal organisation of the broader Young Labor movement. AYL represents all members of the Labor party aged between 14 and 26, operating as a federation with autonomous branches in all Australian states and territories which serve under the relevant parliamentary party branch. As an organisation, AYL is the oldest continuously operating youth wing of any political party in Australian history and continues to be a dominant force in student, state, territorial and federal politics.

AYL comes together with other state and territory branches and parliamentary parties to organise and campaign during national conferences and federal elections. Young Labor is very closely connected and integrated with its mother party, with many members of the organisation leading successful political careers after the fact. Former presidents of Young Labor have included former New South Wales Premier Bob Carr, current federal Minister for Employment and Workplace Relations Tony Burke, former Special Minister of State, Senator John Faulkner, former member for Maribyrnong and former federal Labor leader Bill Shorten, as well as various of state and federal ministers and MPs.

== Formation ==
The first officially sanctioned Young Labor group was formed in Western Australia in March 1920 as the Young Labor League. The Labor Guild of Youth was established in Victoria in 1926, followed by the Labor Guild of New South Wales the following year. The first provisional meeting of the ALP's National Youth Council was held in 1948 as an effort to revitalise Young Labor branches that had become dormant during World War II. By the 1960s most states had created young labor organisations, usually called the Young Labor Association (YLA). In the early 1970s there was a move to set up a permanent national organisation. In 1971 leaders of several state YLAs met in Adelaide to constitute a national body and the first conference was held in Adelaide in early 1972 with future federal parliamentarian Bob McMullan elected as the first national president. Australian Young Labor (AYL) was included in the constitution of the ALP in 1973.

== Ideology ==
Australian Young Labor promotes social democracy and democratic socialism with a focus on issues relevant to younger Australians. AYL advocates for social justice, aiming to reduce inequality and improve access to essential services like healthcare and education. It supports progressive policies on LGBTQIA+ rights, gender equality, Indigenous reconciliation, and multiculturalism. Environmental sustainability is a key concern, with AYL pushing for strong climate action and a transition to renewable energy. The organization also champions economic justice, advocating for fair wages, job creation, and workers’ rights, as well as the protection and expansion of public services, particularly in education and healthcare. AYL seeks to increase the political participation of young people and supports progressive foreign policy grounded in human rights and global cooperation. Although it aligns with ALP values, AYL often takes more progressive stances, reflecting the priorities of its younger membership.

== National conference ==
Biennially Australian Young Labor holds a conference in a capital city, normally Canberra. The conference is usually held at a university campus and typically features guest speakers from the ALP. At the conference several positions are elected by delegates chosen from state branches. Fifteen executive positions are also elected. The Young Labor National President is a non-voting ex-officio representative on the Australian Labor Party National Executive.

=== Notable conference action ===
- The inaugural Australian Young Labor Conference, held in Adelaide in 1972, drew controversy following the alleged surveillance of conference delegates by Australian Federal Police officers. The conference had suspended on the second day to vote on an urgency motion condemning the presence of police. The motion passed, and the conference adjourned to allow members to form a vocal and public protest against two federal police officers who had been stationed outside the conference venue. The protest was ultimately peaceful and no arrests were made.
- At the 1973 AYL Conference and only months after the end of Australia's involvement in the Vietnam War, delegates had voted for Australia to "become a sanctuary" for the world's military draft resisters. Delegates had alleged the federal government had recently denied entry into the country for infamous American draft resister and activist Steve Grossman, a claim the Whitlam government refuted.
- Less than three months following the controversial dismissal of the Whitlam government by Governor-General Sir John Kerr, the Australian Young Labor conference passed a motion for Kerr to be disallowed entry back into Australia following completion of an overseas trip. The motion was submitted by the South Australian delegation, and called on Australian trade unions to use the power of their membership base to block Kerr's return, stating "if Sir John thought he had a democratic right to dismiss Mr Gough Whitlam as Prime Minister then trade unions also have the right to withdraw their labour."
- Following some division between left and right factions of the AYL in 2023 about the adoption of the IHRA definition of antisemitism, New South Wales Young Labor adopted unanimously a motion in 2025 condemning antisemitism and promoting Jewish participation in the ALP by establishing a working group to advise the executive on matters relating to anti-Semitism, inclusion and representation.

== National Executive ==
=== National Presidents ===
Name	State	Term start	Term end	Other offices held	Ref
Bob McMullan	Western Australia	1972	1973	ALP National Secretary (1981–1988); Senator for the Australian Capital Territory (1988–1996); Member of the Australian House of Representatives for Canberra (1996–1998) and Fraser (1998–2010); Minister in the Keating government (1993–1996)	
Pam Allan	New South Wales	1975	1976	Member of the New South Wales Legislative Assembly for Wentworthville (1988–1991, 1999–2007) and Blacktown (1991–1999); Minister in the Carr government (1995–1999)	
Arch Bevis	Queensland	1978	1979	Member of the Australian House of Representatives for Brisbane (1990–2010)	
Terry Connolly	South Australia	1979	1980	Member of the Australian Capital Territory Legislative Assembly (1990–1996); Minister in the Follett government (1991–1995); Judge of the Australian Capital Territory Supreme Court (2003–2007)	
Glenn Bachelor	New South Wales	1980	1981		
Paul Pearce	New South Wales	1981	1982	Australian Young Labor Secretary (1980–1981); Mayor of Waverley (1997–2004); Member of the New South Wales Legislative Assembly for Coogee (2003–2011)	
Steve Bartos	Australian Capital Territory	1983	1984	ACT Young Labor President (1981–1982)	
Joanne Scard	New South Wales	1986	1987		
Ian Rogers	New South Wales	1987	1988		
Janelle Howe	Queensland	1988	1989		
Sue Thompson	Australian Capital Territory	1990	1991		
Tony Burke	New South Wales	1993	1994	Member of the New South Wales Legislative Council (2003–2004); Member of the Australian House of Representatives for Watson (2004– ) Minister in the Rudd (2007–2010, 2013), Gillard (2010–2013) and Albanese (2022– ) governments.	
Tim Holding	Victoria	1994	1995	Member of the Victorian Legislative Assembly for Springvale (1999–2002) and Lyndhurst (2002–2013); Minister in the Bracks and Brumby governments (2006–2010)	
Cherie Burton	New South Wales	1995	1996	Member of the New South Wales Legislative Assembly for Kogarah (1999–2015); Minister in the Iemma government (2005–2007)	
Ben Hubbard	Victoria	1996	1997	Chief of Staff to the Prime Minister (2011–2013)	
Milton Dick	Queensland	1997	1998	Queensland Labor State Secretary (2004–2008); Brisbane City Councillor (2008–2016); Member of the Australian House of Representatives for Oxley (2016– ) Speaker of the Australian House of Representatives (2022– )	
Daniel Cook	New South Wales	1998	1999	Councillor for the City of Gosford (1999–2004)	
Jacki O'Mara	Queensland	1999	2000		
Amanda Rishworth	South Australia	2000	2001	Member of the Australian House of Representatives for Kingston (2007– ) Minister in the Albanese government (2022– )	
		2001	2002		
		2002	2003		
Alex Dighton	South Australia	2003	2004	Member of the South Australian House of Assembly for Black (2024– )	
		2004	2005		
		2005	2006		
		2006	2007		
Sam Crosby	New South Wales	2007	2008		
Ben Rillo	South Australia	2015	2017		
Jack Boyd		2017	2019		
Jason Byrne	South Australia	2019	2021		
Ali Amin	South Australia	2021	2023		
Manu Risoldi	New South Wales	2023	Mid-2025		
Eloise Atterton	South Australia	Mid-2025	2025		
Chris Hancock	Queensland	2025	Incumbent		

=== National Secretaries ===
Name	State	Term start	Term end	Other offices held	Ref
Gillian Currie	Australian Capital Territory	1979	1980		
Paul Pearce	New South Wales	1980	1981	Australian Young Labor President (1981–1982); Mayor of Waverley (1997–2004); Member of the New South Wales Legislative Assembly for Coogee (2003–2011)	
Shane Maddick	Victoria	1981	1982		
Mark Cuomo	Western Australia	1983	1984		
Mark Kenny	South Australia	1985	1986		
Grant Fitsner	South Australia	1986	1987		
Sue Thompson	Australian Capital Territory	1992	1993		
Liam McKay	Queensland	1993	1994		
Eddie Husic	New South Wales	1994	1995	Member of the Australian House of Representatives for Chifley (2010–present); Minister in the Albanese government (2022–2025)	
		1995	1996		
Justin Jarvis	South Australia	1996	1997		
Aaron Gadiel	New South Wales	1997	1998		
Paul Bini	Tasmania	1998	1999		
Jamie Driscoll	Australian Capital Territory	1999	2000		
		2000	2001		
		2001	2002		
		2002	2003		
Lambros Tapinos	Victoria	2003	2004	Councillor for the City of Merri-bek (2008–2024)	
		2004	2005		
		2005	2006		
		2015	2017		
Gemma Paech	South Australia	2017	2019		
		2019	2021		
Ella Gvildys	Victoria	2021	2023		
Isabella Scattini	Queensland	2023	2025	Assistant Secretary of Queensland Labor (2026– )	
Louis Gordon	Australian Capital Territory	2025	Incumbent		

=== Other notable former officeholders ===
- Sam Dastyari – New South Wales Young Labor President (2005–2006)
- Prue Car – New South Wales Young Labor Secretary (2004–2005)
- Chris Minns – New South Wales Young Labor President (2002)
- David Bradbury – New South Wales Young Labor President (1998)
- Matt Thistlethwaite – New South Wales Young Labor President (1997)
- Michelle Rowland – New South Wales Young Labor Secretary (1996), Australian Young Labor Senior Vice-President (1996–1997)
- Linus Power – Australian Young Labor Senior Vice-President (1998–1999)
- Duncan Pegg – Australian Young Labor Executive Committee (2003–2004)
- Jo Haylen – Australian Young Labor Executive Committee (2003–2004)
- Amanda Rishworth – Australian Young Labor Vice-President (1999–2000)
- Andrew Barr – Australian Young Labor Executive Committee (1998–1999), ACT Young Labor President (1998–2000)
- Nick Champion – Australian Young Labor Executive Committee (1994–1995)
- Luke Foley – Australian Young Labor Executive Committee (1993–1994)
- Mark Arbib – New South Wales Young Labor President (1995)
- Carmel Tebbutt – New South Wales Young Labor President (1990)
- Anthony Albanese – New South Wales Young Labor President (1985–1986)
- John Faulkner – New South Wales Young Labor President (1978)
- Bob Carr – New South Wales Young Labor President (1970–1971)
- Paul Keating – New South Wales Young Labor President (1967–1968)
- Ryan Batchelor – Australian Young Labor National Conference Delegate (2004)
- Reba Meagher – New South Wales Young Labor President (1992–1993)
- Pam Allan – New South Wales Young Labor President (1975), New South Wales Young Labor Secretary (1974)
- Laurie Brereton – New South Wales Young Labor President (1967–1968)
- Christian Zahra – Victorian Young Labor Secretary (1996)
- Julie Collins – Tasmanian Young Labor President (1996)
- Pat Conroy – Australian Young Labor Vice-President (2003–2004), New South Wales Young Labor Vice-President (2003–2004)
- Patrick Gorman – Western Australian Young Labor Secretary (2007–2008)
- Matt Keogh – Western Australian Young Labor President (2007)
- Murray Watt – Queensland Young Labor President (1998)
- Daryl Melham – New South Wales Young Labor Assistant Secretary (1978)
- Barry Jones – Victorian Young Labor Chairman (1955–1956)
- Kerry O'Brien – New South Wales Young Labor Vice-President (1975)
- Tony Lamb – Victorian Young Labor President (1969–1970)
- Clyde Holding – Victorian Young Labor Secretary (1955–1956), Victorian Young Labor President (1956–1957)
- Con Sciacca – Queensland Young Labor President (1972)
- Fatima Payman – Western Australian Young Labor President (2021)
- Denis Murphy – Queensland Young Labor President (1965–1967)
- Dorothy Tangney – Western Australian Young Labor President (1929–1930)
- Joe Tripodi – New South Wales Young Labor Secretary (1992–1993)
- Mike Kaiser – ACT Young Labor Secretary (1986–1987)
- Paul O'Grady – Australian Young Labor Assistant National Secretary (1983–1984)
- John Quiggin – ACT Young Labor President (1978–1979)
- Barbara Wiese – South Australian Young Labor President (1974–1975), Australian Young Labor Vice-President (1975–1976)
- David Smith – ACT Young Labor President (1995)
- Tania Mihailuk – New South Wales Young Labor Secretary (2000)
- Verity Firth – New South Wales Young Labor Vice-President (1996–1997)
- Frank Crean – Victorian Young Labor President (1948–1949)
- Charlotte Walker – South Australian Young Labor President (2024–2025)
- Richard Dowling – Australian Young Labor International Secretary (2006–2007)

== Criticism and controversy ==
On 8 December 2004, The Sydney Morning Herald published allegations that factional leaders within the Labor Party in New South Wales were "petty, faction obsessed and vindictive". The article, authored by Aubrey Belford, then a member of the ALP and former editor of the Sydney University student paper, Honi Soit, laments a Young Labor dominated by factional infighting, "Put simply, the party culture encourages young people to devote their energy to pursuing objectives that ultimately have no impact on the real world, and to pursue them through ritual political violence."

On 23 January 2012, president of Queensland Young Labor, Chaiy Donati came under significant criticism following links to the United States Republican Party. Online news source Crikey reported that he helped anti-war and pro drug legalisation Republican candidate Ron Paul in his fight for the primaries in New Hampshire. Ron Paul came second to Mitt Romney on the Republican Party ballot, and, as a write-in candidate, second to Barack Obama on the Democratic Party ballot in New Hampshire. On his return to Queensland, numerous factional rivalries emerged between members. Despite this, Chaiy Donati remained the right's factional leader and in 2013 secured Queensland's Kerrie Kahlon the Australian Young Labor presidency. Chaiy Donati returned to the United States in April 2016, this time working on the Democratic primaries for Bernie Sanders in a close run against Hillary Clinton.

In August 2018, Federal Labor staffer and ACT Young Labor member Nick Douros was suspended from his role in the party and quit as a staffer to Senator David Smith. The party's internal disputes tribunal upheld an allegation he and ACT Young Labor conduct contact officer Francis Claessens, and Niall Cummins—had contravened the party's code of conduct for bullying a fellow member, calling her a "rat" and saying they would make her life hell. All three men were ordered to attend mediation and undergo respectful behaviour training. The victim alleged she was targeted as a result of an internal party stoush during the pre-selection process for seats. In 2019, Nick Douros was elected national secretary of AYL.
