= 2012 New Hampshire Democratic presidential primary =

- January 10, 2012

28 pledged delegates to the 2012 Democratic National Convention

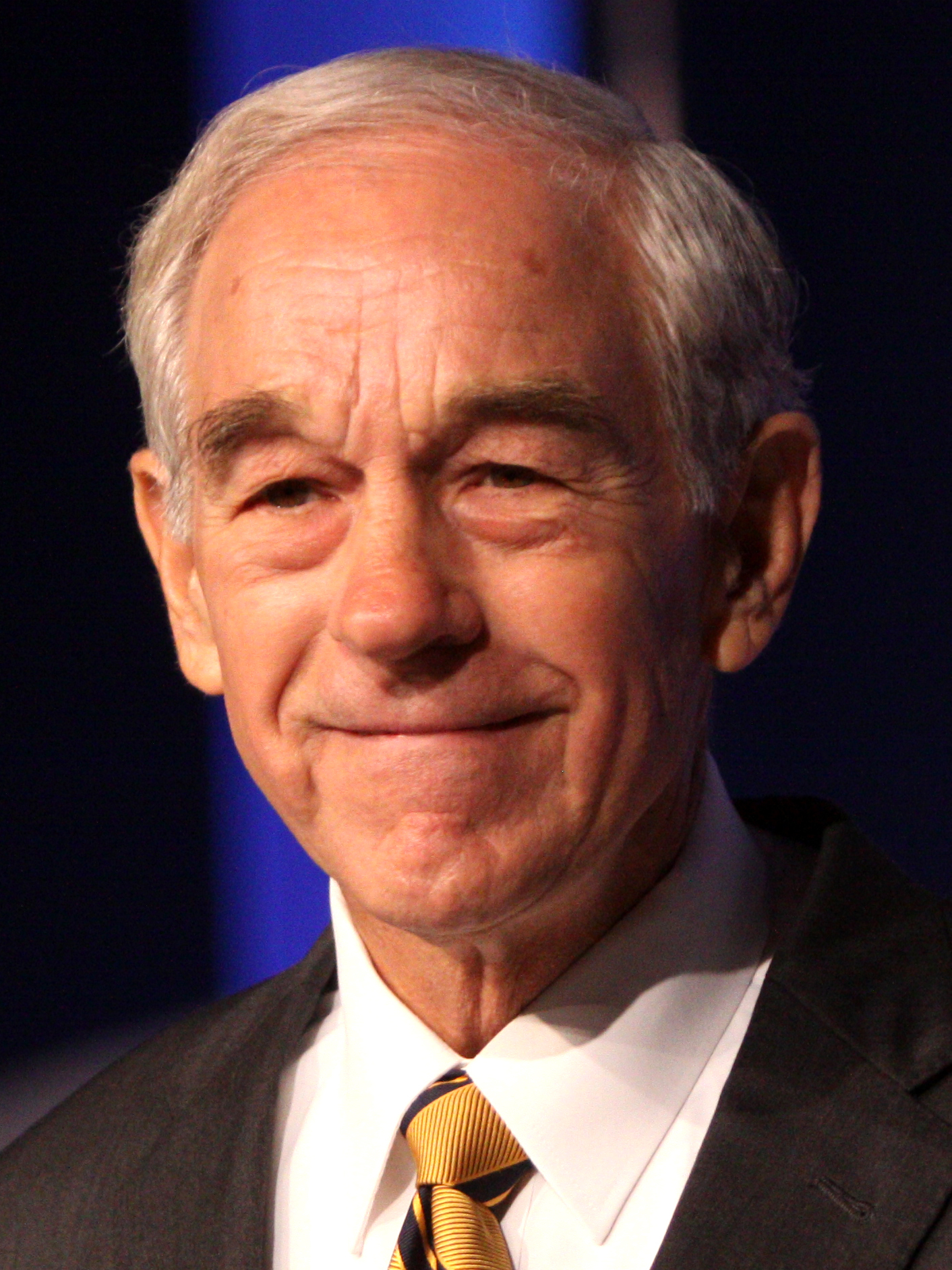
Candidate	Barack Obama	Ron Paul (write-in)
Home state	Illinois	Texas
Delegate count	28	0
Popular vote	49,080	2,289
Percentage	80.91%	3.77%
- Municipality results Obama: 50% 55% 60% 65% 70% 75% 80% 85% 90% 95% No votes

The 2012 New Hampshire Democratic presidential primary took place on Tuesday, January 10, 2012, as the second major contest of the primary cycle following the Iowa caucuses the previous week. New Hampshire's 28 pledged delegates to the Democratic National Convention were allocated based on the results of the primary.

Incumbent President Barack Obama won the primary in a landslide facing no major opposition to his candidacy.

== Procedure ==
The presidential primary was semi-closed, meaning voters registered as Democrats or independents were eligible to vote.

New Hampshire was allocated 35 delegates to the Democratic National Convention: 28 were allocated based on the results of the primary, with the other seven being unpledged superdelegates.

In order to qualify for delegates, a candidate had to receive at least 15% of the vote statewide or in at least one congressional district. 10 of New Hampshire's delegates were allocated based on the statewide popular vote, consisting of six at-large delegates and four pledged PLEOs (party leaders and elected officials). Each of New Hampshire's two congressional districts were allotted nine pledged delegates.

== Candidates ==
The following candidates qualified to appear on the ballot:

- Randall Terry, West Virginia
- Aldous Tyler, Wisconsin
- John Wolfe Jr., Tennessee
- Ed Cowan, Vermont
- Bob Ely, Illinois
- Craig "Tax Freeze" Freis, California
- Bob Greene, California
- John D. Haywood, North Carolina
- Robert B. Jordan, California
- Barack Obama, Illinois
- Cornelius Edward O'Connor, Florida
- Edward T. O'Donnell, Jr., Delaware
- Darcy Richardson, Florida
- Vermin Supreme, Massachusetts

== Lesser-Known Candidates Forum ==
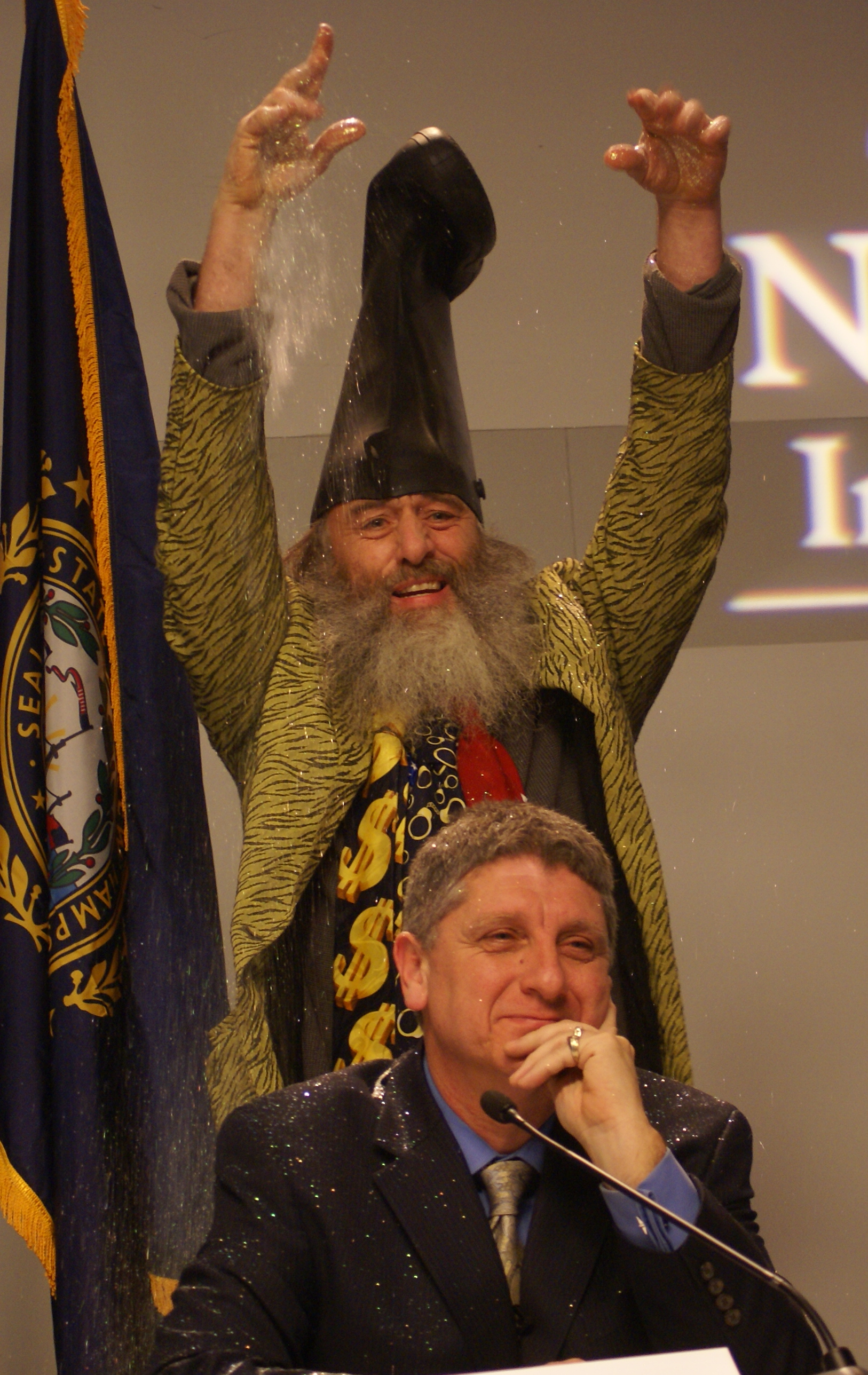
Vermin Supreme glitter bombs Randall Terry during the Lesser-Known Candidates Forum

As it has done ahead of every New Hampshire presidential primary since 1972, the New Hampshire Institute of Politics at Saint Anselm College hosted its Lesser-Known Candidates Forum on December 19, 2011. Seven of the invited Democratic candidates participated in the forum: Ed Cowan, Bob Greene, John D. Haywood, Ed O'Donnell, Vermin Supreme, Randall Terry and John Wolfe Jr.

During the forum, satirical perennial candidate Vermin Supreme stood up and glitterbombed fellow candidate Randall Terry, founder of the anti-abortion organization Operation Rescue and vocal opponent of same-sex marriage, saying "Jesus told me to turn Randy Terry gay."

== Results ==
With a lack of major challengers to his renomination, incumbent president Barack Obama won the primary with over 80% of votes cast. Congressman Ron Paul, who finished second in the state's Republican presidential primary, won more than three percent of the vote through write-ins and placed second to Obama in the primary. Republican candidates Mitt Romney, who won the Republican primary, and Jon Huntsman Jr., who finished third, won more votes than Ed Cowan, the Democratic candidate who won the most votes other than Obama.

2012 New Hampshire Democratic presidential primary
Candidate	Votes	%	Delegates
Barack Obama (incumbent)	49,080	80.91	28
Ron Paul (write-in)	2,289	3.77	
Mitt Romney (write-in)	1,814	2.99	
Jon Huntsman Jr. (write-in)	1,238	2.04	
Ed Cowan	945	1.56	
Vermin Supreme	833	1.37	
Randall Terry	442	0.73	
John D. Haywood	423	0.70	
Craig "Tax Freeze" Freis	400	0.66	
Rick Santorum (write-in)	302	0.50	
Bob Ely	287	0.47	
Newt Gingrich (write-in)	276	0.46	
Cornelius O'Connor	266	0.44	
Darcy Richardson	264	0.44	
John Wolfe Jr.	245	0.40	
Ed O'Donnell	222	0.37	
Bob Greene	213	0.35	
Robert B. Jordan	155	0.26	
Aldous Tyler	106	0.17	
Buddy Roemer (write-in)	29	0.05	
Fred Karger (write-in)	26	0.04	
Rick Perry (write-in)	17	0.03	
Stewart Greenleaf (write-in)	4	0.01	
Gary Johnson (write-in)	4	0.01	
Michael Meehan (write-in)	2	0.00	
Michele Bachmann (write-in)	2	0.00	
Herman Cain (write-in)	1	0.00	
Other write-ins	772	1.27	
Total	60,659	100%	28

== See also ==
- 2012 New Hampshire Republican presidential primary
- 2012 Democratic Party presidential primaries
