= 1960 New Hampshire Democratic presidential primary =

- March 8, 1960

Candidate	John F. Kennedy	Paul C. Fisher
Home state	Massachusetts	Kansas
Popular vote	43,372	6,853
Percentage	85.3%	13.5%
- County results Kennedy: 70-80% 80-90%

The 1960 New Hampshire Democratic presidential primary was held on March 8, 1960, in New Hampshire as one of the Democratic Party's statewide nomination contests ahead of the 1960 United States presidential election.

== Results ==
U.S. Senator from Massachusetts John F. Kennedy, facing no formidable opposition in New Hampshire, won the primary in a landslide over Paul C. Fisher, a scientist best known for inventing the Zero Gravity Pen. Kennedy would go on to win the Democratic party's nomination, as well as the presidency in the general election.

New Hampshire Democratic primary, March 8, 1960
Candidate	Votes	Percentage
John F. Kennedy	43,372	85.3%
Paul C. Fisher	6,853	13.5%
Stuart Symington	183	0.4%
Adlai Stevenson II	168	0.3%
Richard Nixon (Republican)	164	0.3%
Other write-ins	159	0.3%
Total	50,899	100%
