= Lesser-Known Candidates Forum =

United States presidential election event

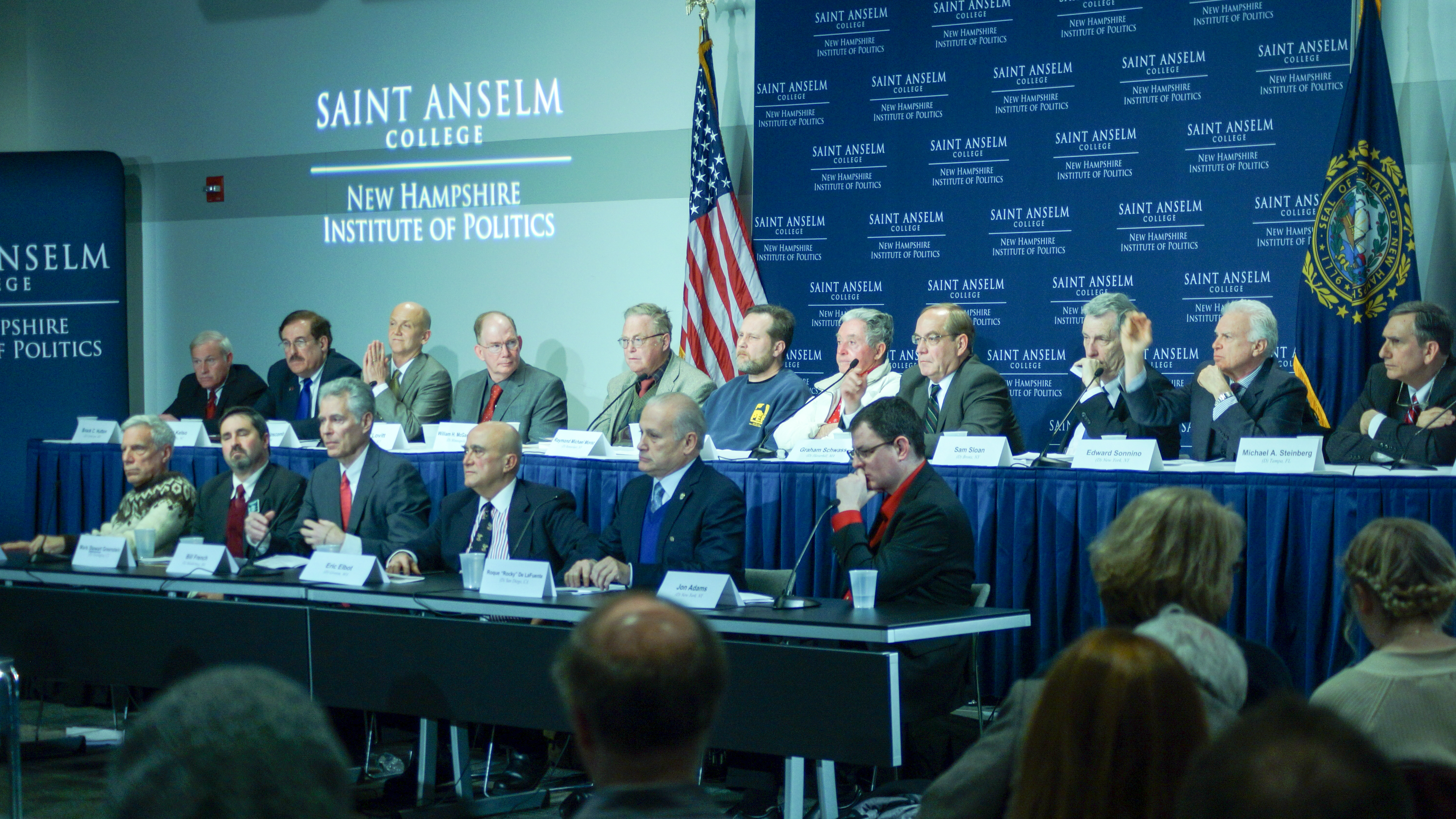
Democratic Party candidates at the 2016 forum

The Lesser-Known Candidates Forum is a quadrennial event during the United States presidential election season that takes place at the St. Anselm College New Hampshire Institute of Politics since 1972. Occurring prior to the New Hampshire primary, it allows for lesser-known presidential candidates of the Democratic and Republican parties to voice their political positions.
