= 1960 New Hampshire Republican presidential primary =

- March 8, 1960

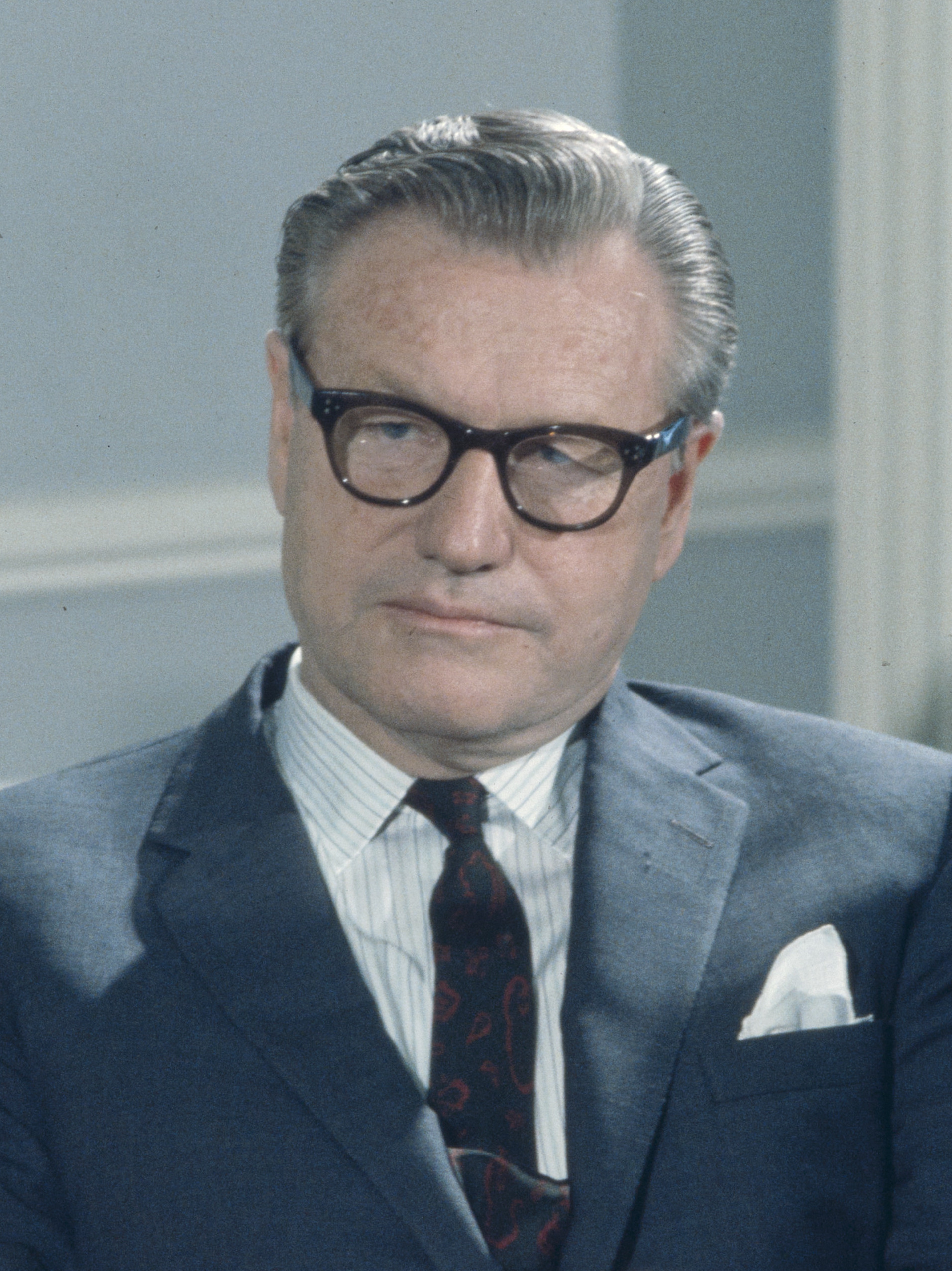
Candidate	Richard Nixon	Nelson Rockefeller (write-in)
Home state	California	New York
Popular vote	65,204	2,745
Percentage	89.3%	3.8%
- County results Nixon

The 1960 New Hampshire Republican presidential primary was held on March 8, 1960, in New Hampshire as one of the Republican Party's statewide nomination contests ahead of the 1960 United States presidential election. Incumbent Vice President Richard Nixon ran virtually unopposed, and thus won the Granite State in a landslide.

== Results ==
New Hampshire Republican Presidential Primary Results – 1960
Party	Candidate	Votes	Percentage
Republican	Richard Nixon	65,204	89.3%
Republican	Nelson Rockefeller	2,745	3.8%
Democratic	John F. Kennedy	2,196	3.0%
Republican	Others	2,886	4.0%
Totals		73,031	100.00%
