= Space Pen =

Gravity-independent ballpoint pen

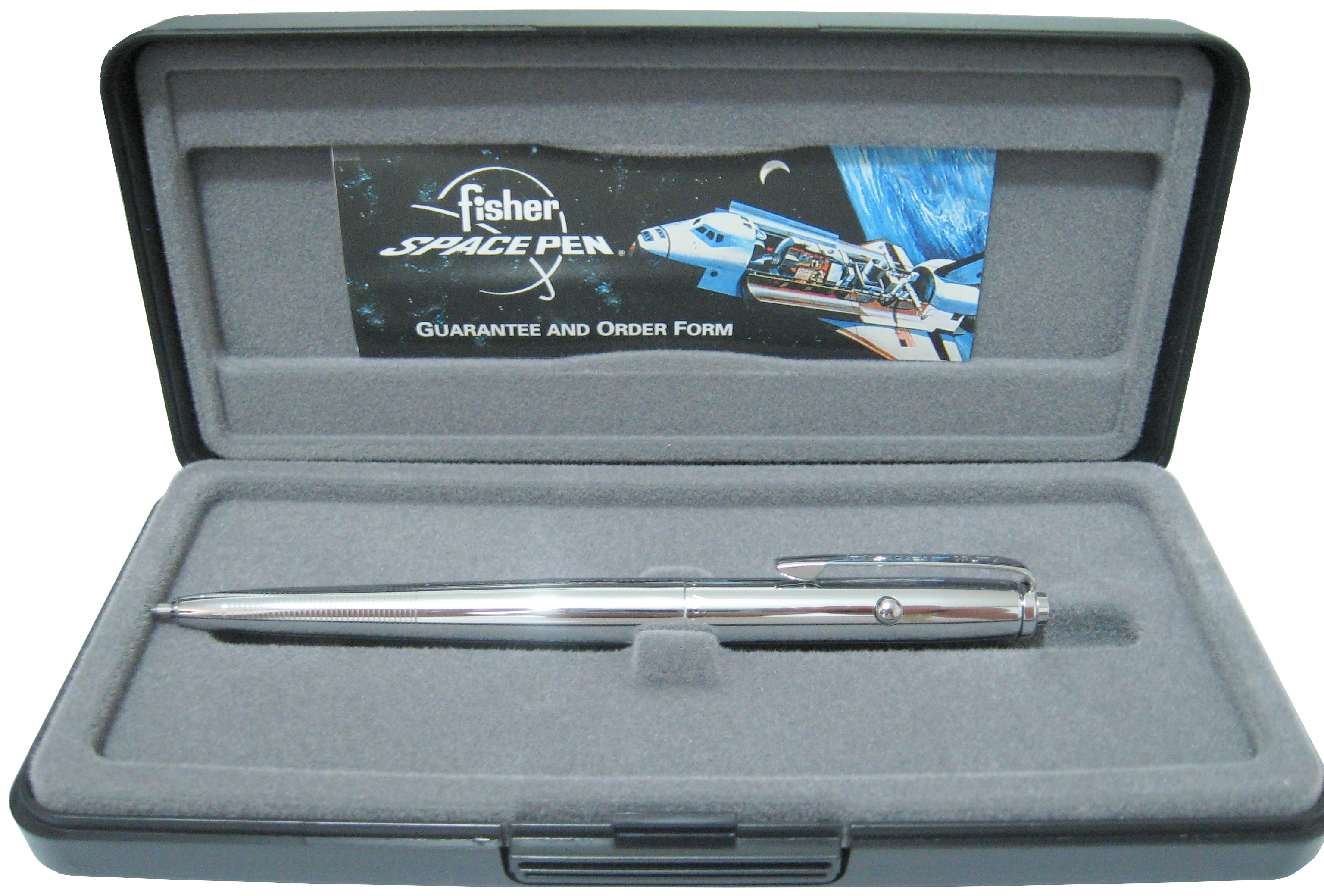
An AG-7 Astronaut Space Pen in presentation case

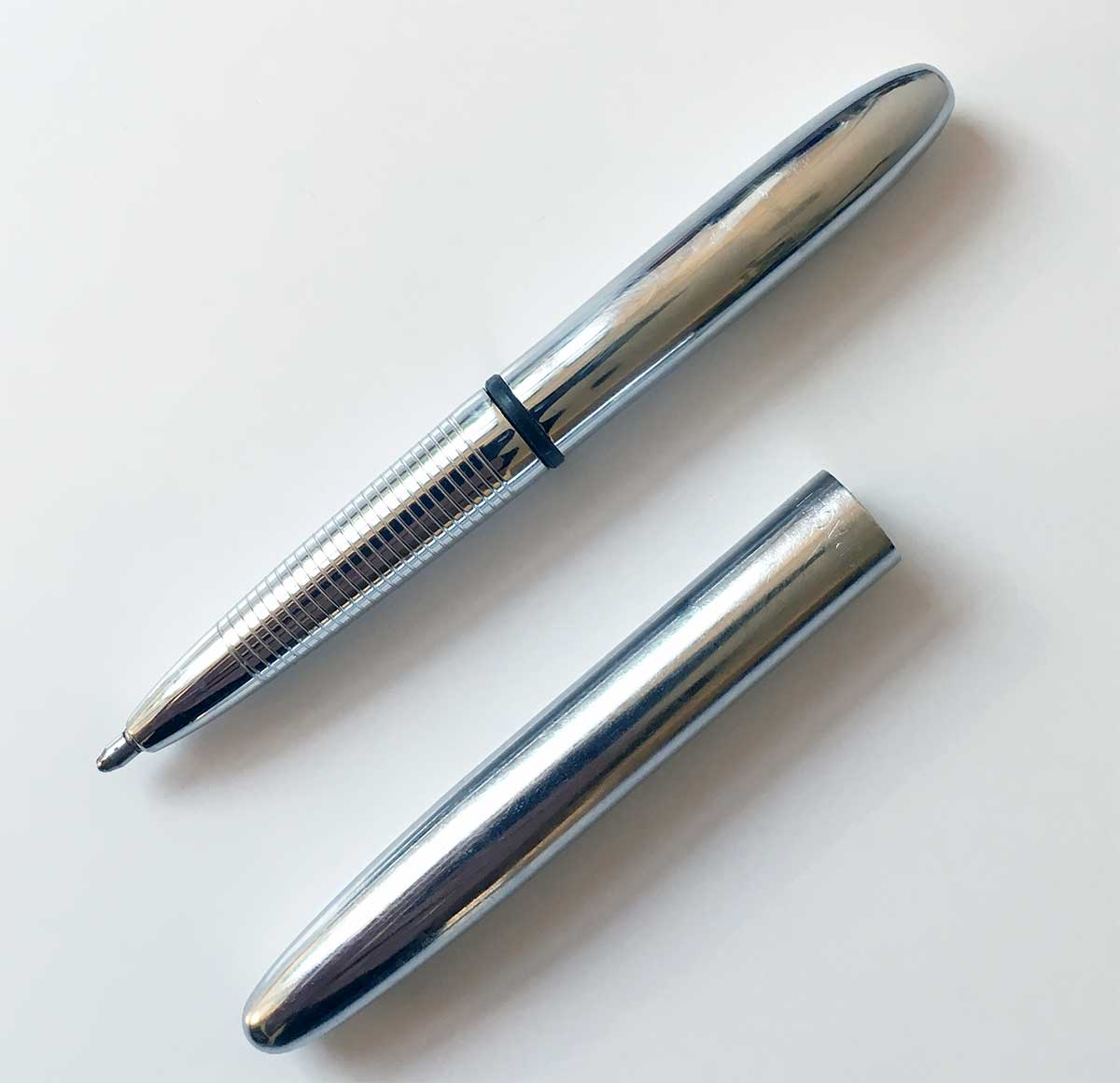
Bullet pen

The Space Pen (also known as the Zero Gravity Pen), marketed by Fisher Space Pen Company, is a pen that uses pressurized ink cartridges and is able to write in zero gravity, underwater, over wet and greasy paper, at any angle (including upside down), and in a very wide range of temperatures.

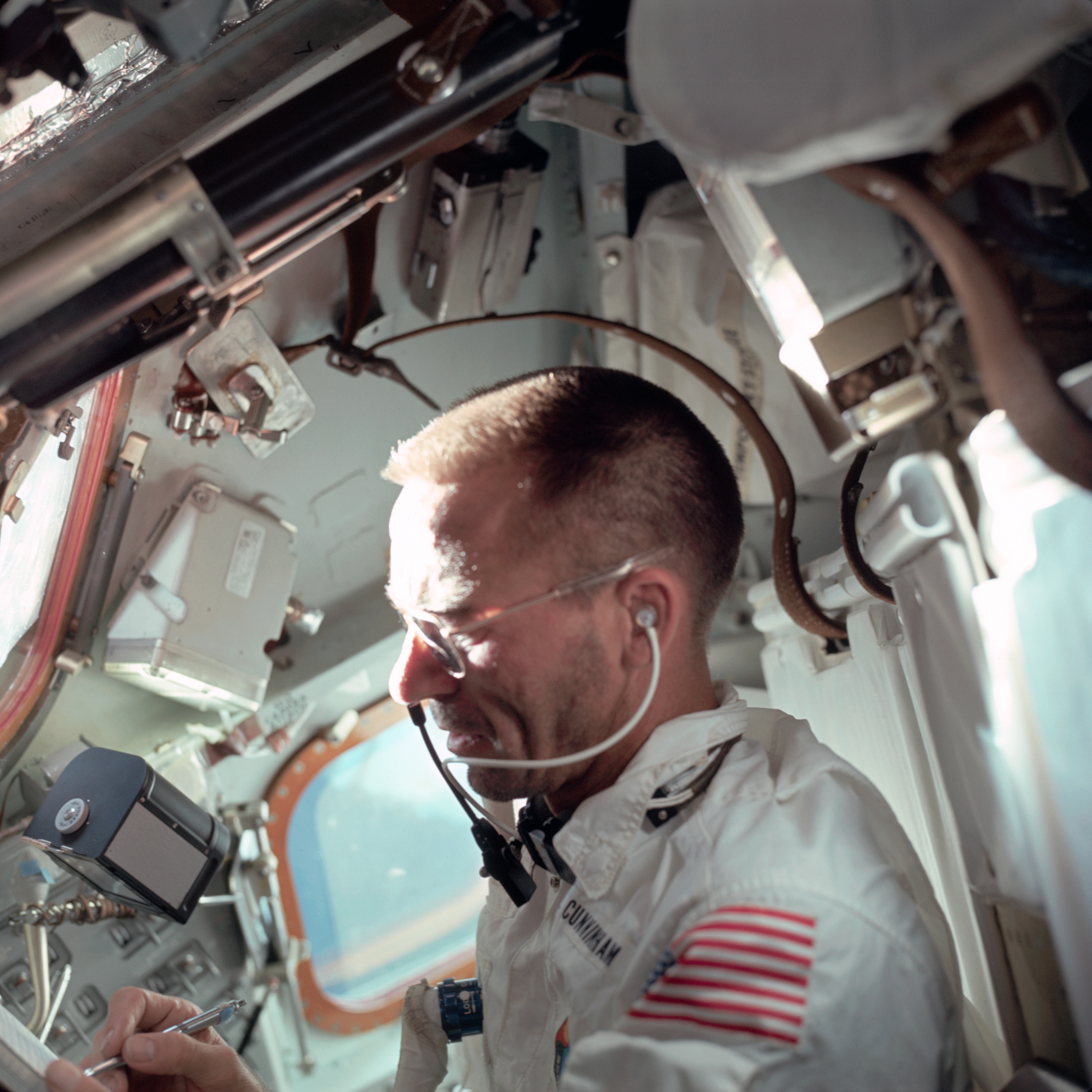
Astronaut Walter Cunningham, Apollo 7 lunar module pilot, writes with space pen as he is photographed performing flight tasks on the ninth day of the Apollo 7 mission.

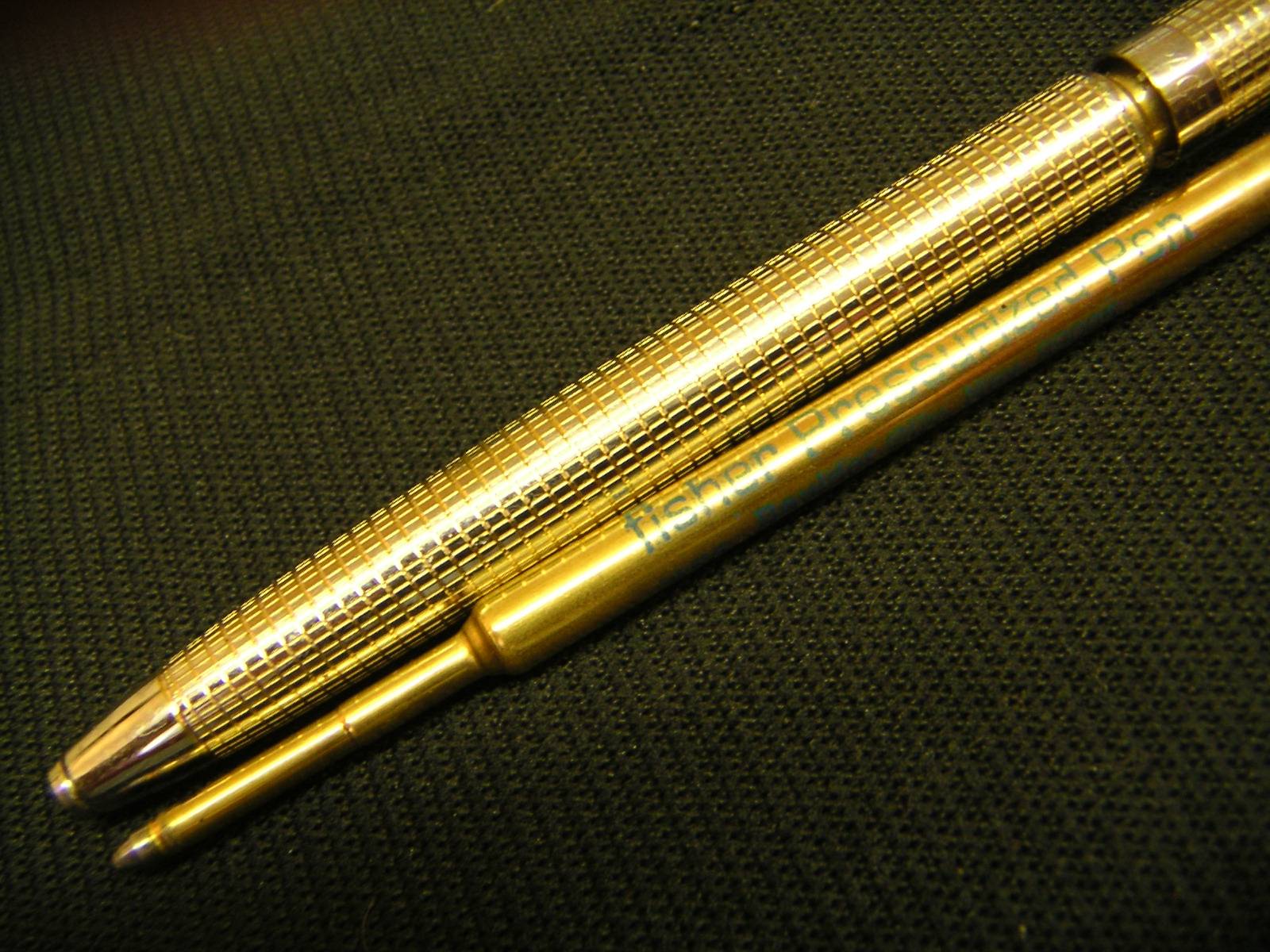
Close up of a Fisher Space Pen body showing knurlings with removed refill adjacent

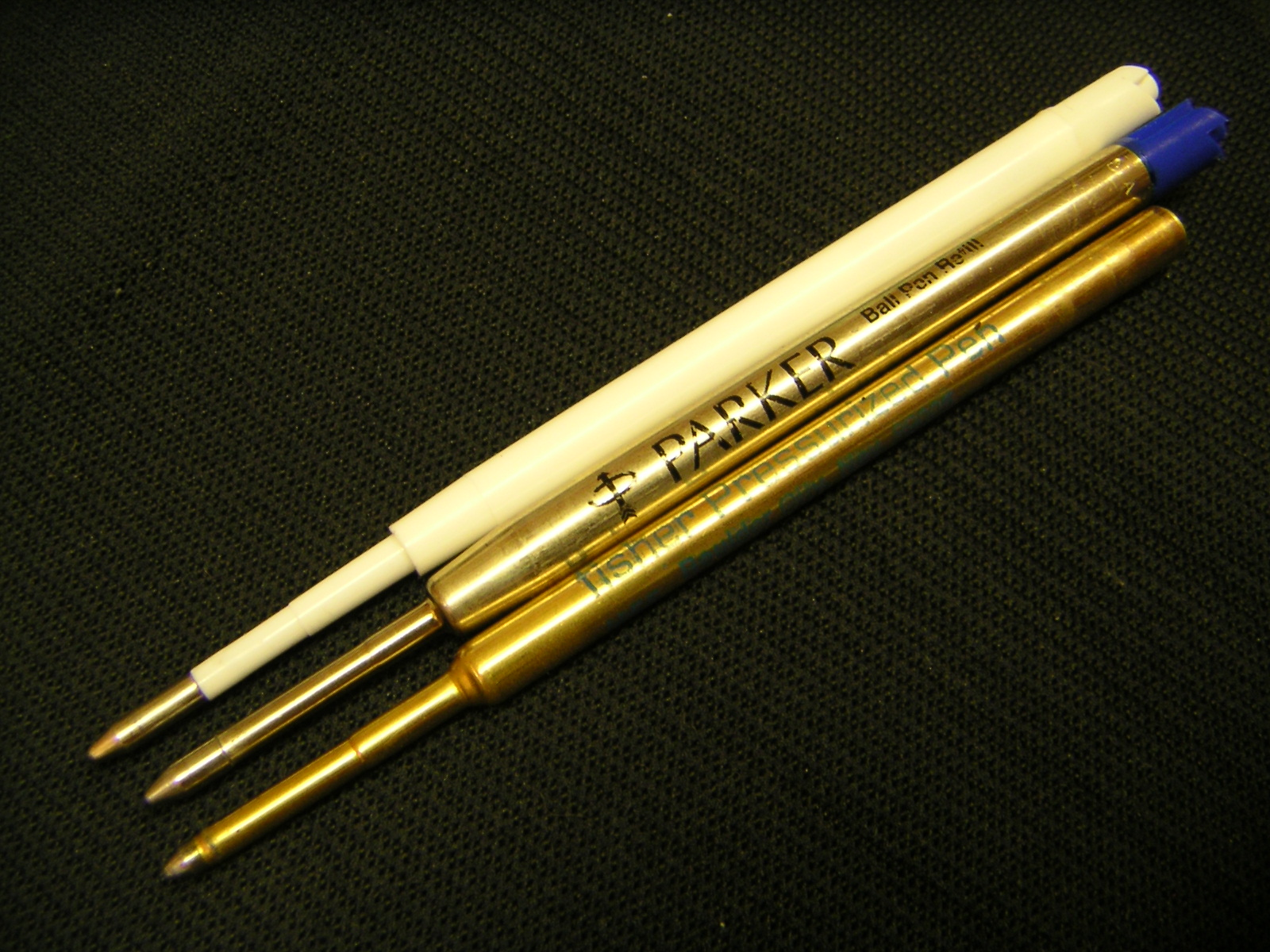
Fisher Space refill at bottom compared to similar Parker-standard and generic (non branded) Parker type at top

== Inventors ==
The Fisher Space Pen was created by Austrian Friedrich Schächter and expanded by Erwin Rath. Paul C. Fisher invented the "thixotropic special ink". The pens are manufactured in Boulder City, Nevada. Paul C. Fisher first patented the AG7 "anti-gravity" pen in 1965.

== Models ==
There are two prominent styles of the pen: the AG7 "Astronaut pen", a long thin retractable pen shaped like a common ballpoint, and the "Bullet pen" which is non-retractable, shorter than standard ballpoints when capped, but full size when the cap is posted on the rear for writing.

Several of the Fisher Space Pen models (the "Millennium" is one) are claimed to write for a lifetime of "average" use; however, the product literature states that the pen will write exactly 30.7 miles (49.4 km). In contrast, the standard PR (Pressurized Refill) cartridge is rated to write for over 12,000 feet (2.3 miles or 3.7 km).

Standard Space Pen refills can be used in any pen able to take a standard Parker-type ballpoint refill, using the small plastic adapter that is supplied with each refill. Fisher also makes a Space Pen-type refill that fits Cross pens, one that fits 1950s-style Paper Mate pens (or any pen that uses that type of refill), and a "universal" refill that fits some other ballpoint pens.

== Technology ==
The ballpoint is made from tungsten carbide and is precisely fitted in order to avoid leaks. A sliding float separates the ink from the pressurized gas. The thixotropic visco-elastic ink in the hermetically sealed and pressurized reservoir is able to write for three times longer than a standard ballpoint pen. The ink is forced out by compressed nitrogen at a pressure of nearly 310 kPa (45 psi; 3.1 atm). Operating temperatures range from −34 to 121 °C (239 to 394 K; −29 to 250 °F). The pen can write without the help of gravity, at any angle. The pen has an estimated shelf life of 100 years.

One of the first Space Pen patents is US3285228, which was filed on 19 May 1965.

== Uses in the U.S. and Soviet space programs ==
An urban legend states that NASA spent a large amount of money to develop a pen that would write in space (the result purportedly being the Fisher Space Pen), while the Soviets just used pencils. In reality, NASA began to develop a space pen, but when development costs skyrocketed the project was abandoned and astronauts went back to using pencils, along with the Soviets. However, the claim that NASA spent millions on the Space Pen is incorrect, as the Fisher pen was developed using private capital, not government funding. The development of the thixotropic ink cost Paul Fisher around $1 million (equivalent to $10 million in 2025). NASA, and the Soviets, eventually began purchasing such pens.

NASA programs previously used pencils (as demonstrated by an order in 1965 for mechanical pencils) but because of the substantial dangers that broken pencil tips and graphite dust pose to electronics in zero gravity, the flammable nature of wood present in pencils, and the inadequate quality documentation produced by non-permanent or smeared recordkeeping, a better solution was needed. Soviet cosmonauts used pencils, and grease pencils on plastic slates until also adopting a space pen in 1969 with a purchase of 100 units for use on all future missions. NASA never approached Paul Fisher to develop a pen, nor did Fisher receive any government funding for the pen's development. Fisher invented it independently and then, in 1965, asked NASA to try it. After extensive testing, NASA decided to use the pens in future Apollo missions. Subsequently, in 1967 it was reported that NASA purchased approximately 400 pens for $2.95 apiece (equivalent to $28 each in 2025).

In 2008, Gene Cernan's Apollo 17-flown space pen sold in a Heritage auction for US$23,900.

As of 2021, Fisher space pens were still being used on the International Space Station.

== In popular culture ==
- The 20th episode of season 3 of the comedy television show Seinfeld is called "The Pen" with a Space Pen featured as a major plot point.
- The Space Pen is featured in the 2009 Bollywood film 3 Idiots, presented by the director of an engineering college to his students.
- It appears in the television shows Mad Men, Gilmore Girls, and How It’s Made.
- The Space Pen is mentioned in the 2004 film Primer and contrasted to the Soviet solution of using a regular pencil for this purpose.

== See also ==
- List of pen types, brands and companies
