= 1952 New Hampshire Republican presidential primary =

- March 11, 1952

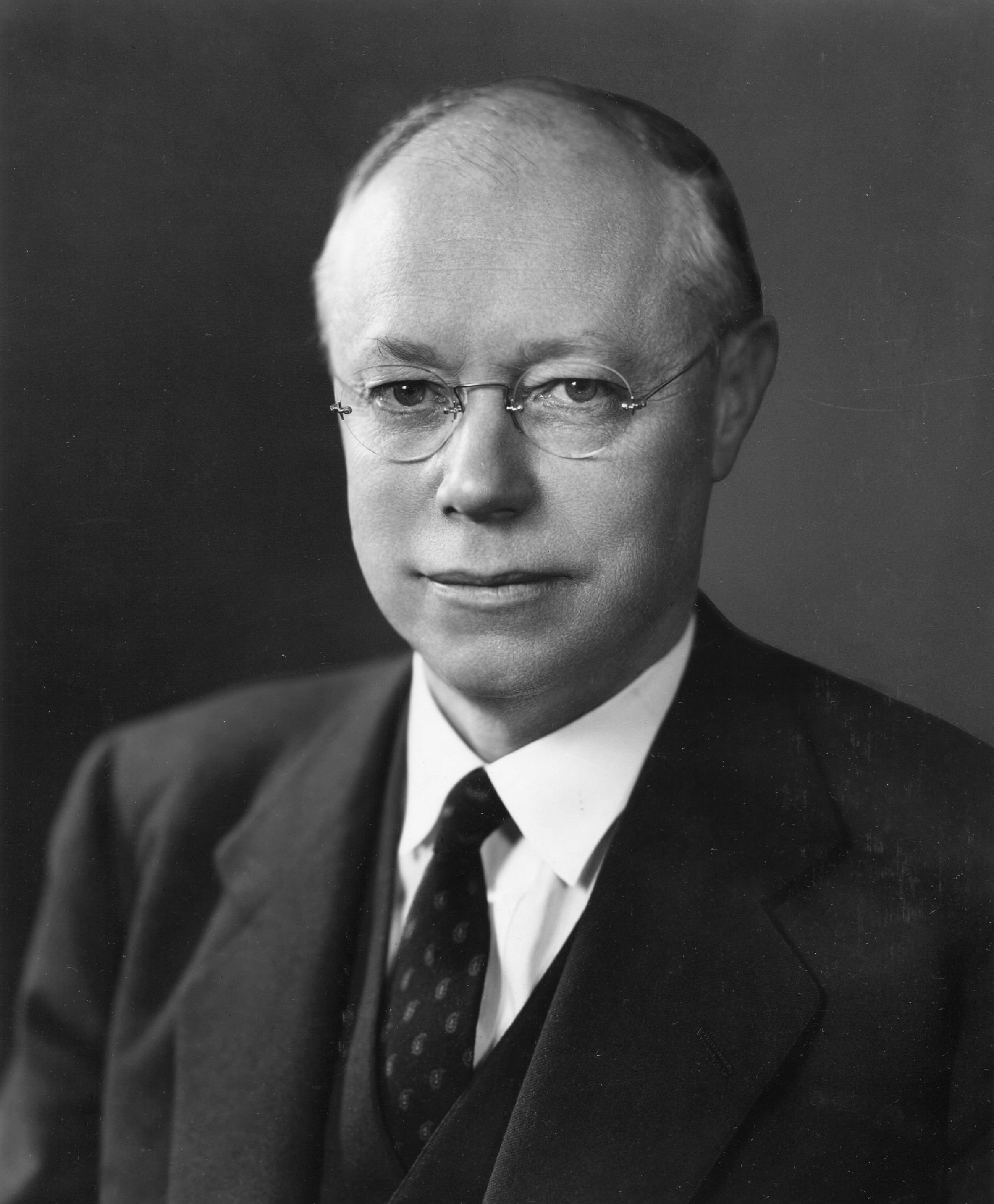

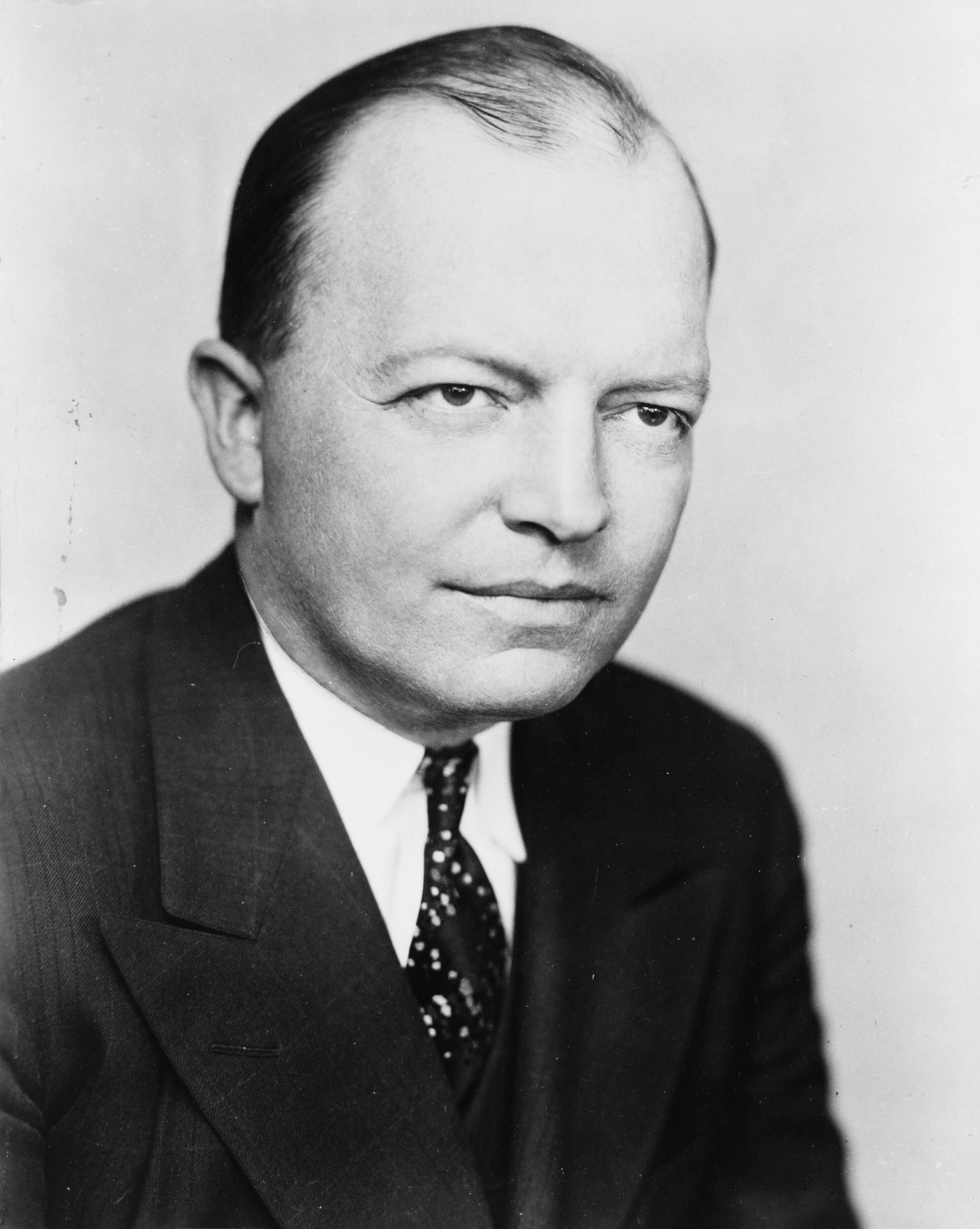

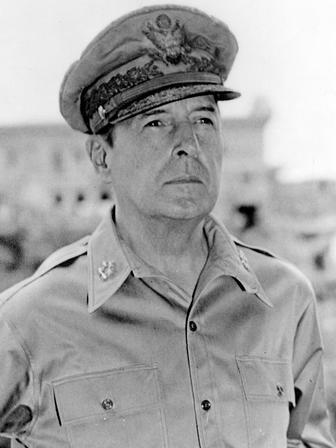
Candidate	Dwight D. Eisenhower	Robert A. Taft
Home state	Kansas	Ohio
Delegate count	14	0
Popular vote	46,661	35,838
Percentage	50.2%	38.6%
Candidate	Harold Stassen	Douglas MacArthur
Home state	Pennsylvania	New York
Delegate count	0	0
Popular vote	6,574	3,227
Percentage	7.1%	3.5%
County results
Eisenhower: 40–50% 50–60%

The 1952 New Hampshire Republican presidential primary was held on March 11, 1952, in New Hampshire as one of the Republican Party's statewide nomination contests ahead of the 1952 United States presidential election. General Dwight D. Eisenhower defeated Senator Robert Taft of Ohio by 12 percentage points on his way to eventual nomination by the Republican Party for President and victory in the 1952 election against Democrat Adlai Stevenson.

== Electoral system ==
After the 1948 presidential primary, the New Hampshire state legislature, concerned by low voter turnout, passed a law that introduced a "presidential preference primary" to the election. For the first time, ballots would include the candidates' names—voters could indicate their preference for candidates for president and vice president directly, as well as indirectly by voting for the delegates their party would sent to the convention, where the candidates for president and vice president would be nominated.

Because the "direct" votes had no bearing on the election of delegates, this new feature of the election was described as a "beauty contest" between the major candidates. Delegates were still elected separately, but under the new rules they could indicate their allegiance as "pledged" or "favorable" to a candidate, only the former of which was legally binding and required the candidate's written consent. All Republican delegates in 1952 ran as "favorable" or undeclared; none were "pledged" to a candidate.

== Results ==
1952 New Hampshire Republican presidential primary results
Candidate	Votes	Percentage	Delegates
Dwight D. Eisenhower	46,661	50.2%	14
Robert A. Taft	35,838	38.6%	0
Harold Stassen	6,574	7.1%	0
Douglas MacArthur	3,227	3.5%	0
Other	565	0.6%	0
Total	92,865	100%	14
