= Paul C. Fisher =

American inventor and politician (1913–2006)

- Born: October 10, 1913; Lebanon, Kansas, U.S.
- Died: October 20, 2006 (aged 93); Boulder City, Nevada
- Occupations: Inventor and politician
- Notable credit: Creation of the Fisher Space Pen

Paul C. Fisher (October 10, 1913 – October 20, 2006) was an American inventor and politician. He invented the Fisher Space Pen.

Fisher was born in Lebanon, Kansas, the son of Alice (Bales) and Carey Albert Fisher, a Methodist minister.

== Fisher Space Pen ==
The Fisher Space Pen is a ballpoint pen which works with thixotropic ink and a pressurized ink cartridge. It can write on almost any substance ranging from butter to steel. It also can survive a wide array of temperatures, ranging from -50 to 160 degrees Fahrenheit.

Fisher submitted his invention to NASA. After vigorous testing, NASA approved Fisher's Space Pen. They purchased four hundred units at a reported price of $6.00 per unit (equivalent to approx. $60 in 2024). NASA purchased three different models: the 204, 207 and 208. The 204 had blue ink and a retraction button on the end. It was used on Skylab and the Apollo missions. It was later replaced by the 207. The 207 model was similar to the 204, except the retraction button had been moved to the side. The 208 model was the same as the 207, except it wrote in black ink. NASA modified these pens for use in the space program. Velcro patches were added along with a standard metal clip to facilitate the storage and attachment of the pen.

== Political activities ==
Fisher unsuccessfully ran for the Democratic Party presidential nomination in 1960 and in 1968. In 1960, he was the only candidate besides John F. Kennedy on the New Hampshire primary ballot, although other candidates were also in the race and on the ballot in other states.

He also made two unsuccessful bids for the United States House of Representatives, first in 1954 and then in 1986.

Fisher proposed the replacement of all existing sales and income taxes with a single graduated asset tax on those with assets of at least $100,000. His 1988 book, The Plan: To Restore the Constitution and Help Us All Get Out Of Debt (ISBN 0961984309), promoted this idea.

== Death ==
Fisher died at his home on October 20, 2006, in Boulder City, Nevada.
