= 2012 New Hampshire Republican presidential primary =

- January 10, 2012

12 Republican National Convention delegates The number of delegates received is determined by the popular vote
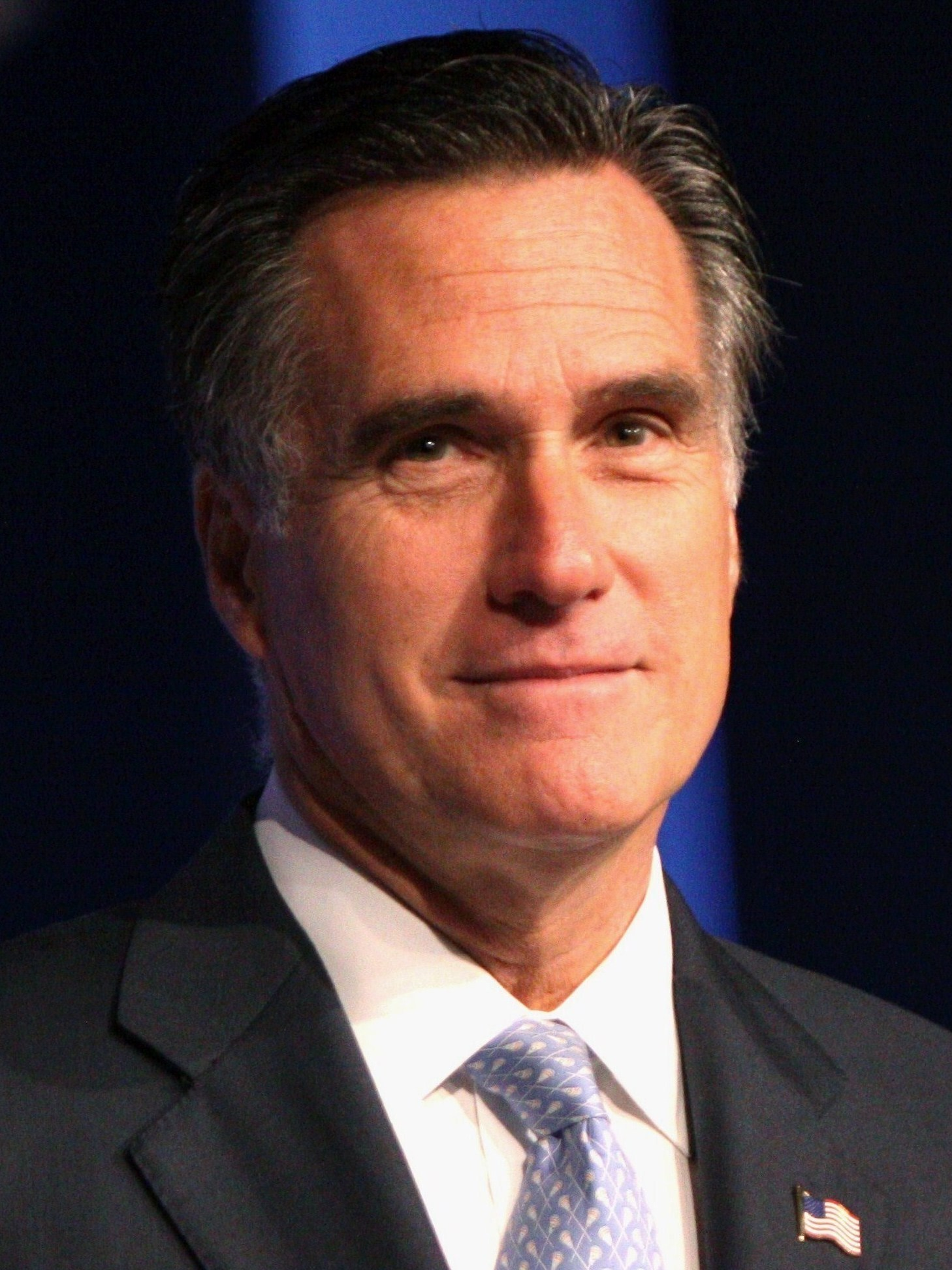

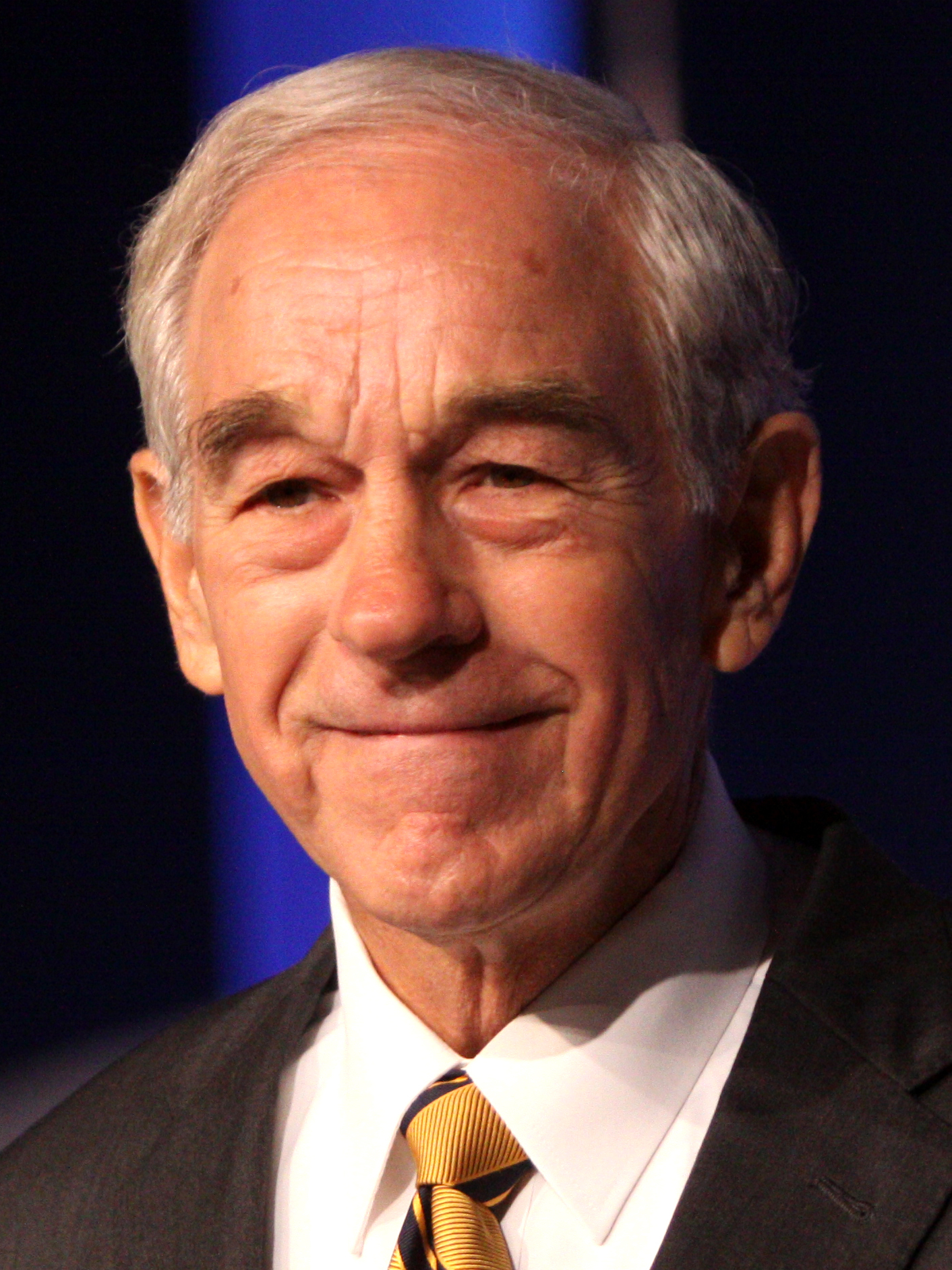

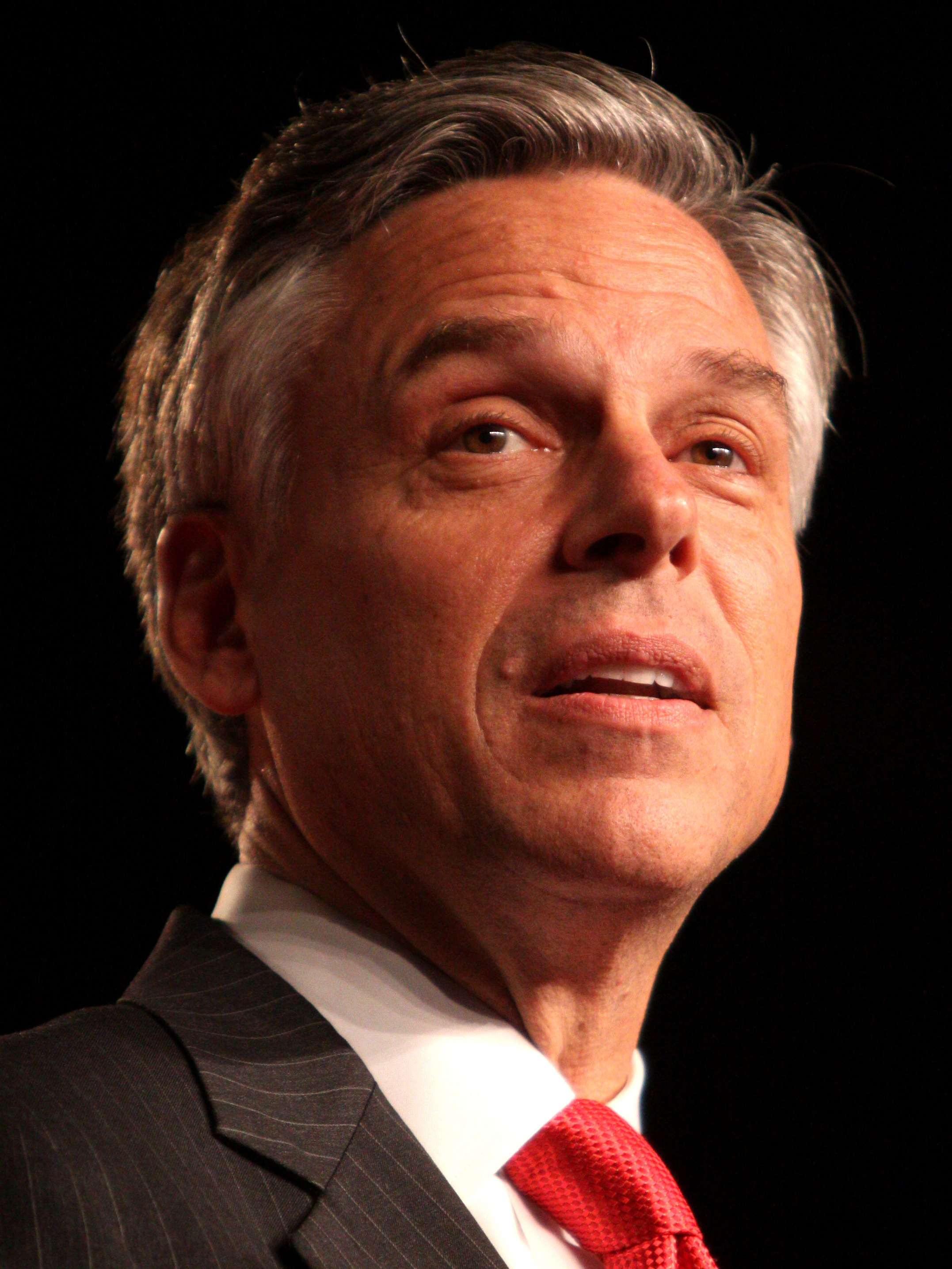

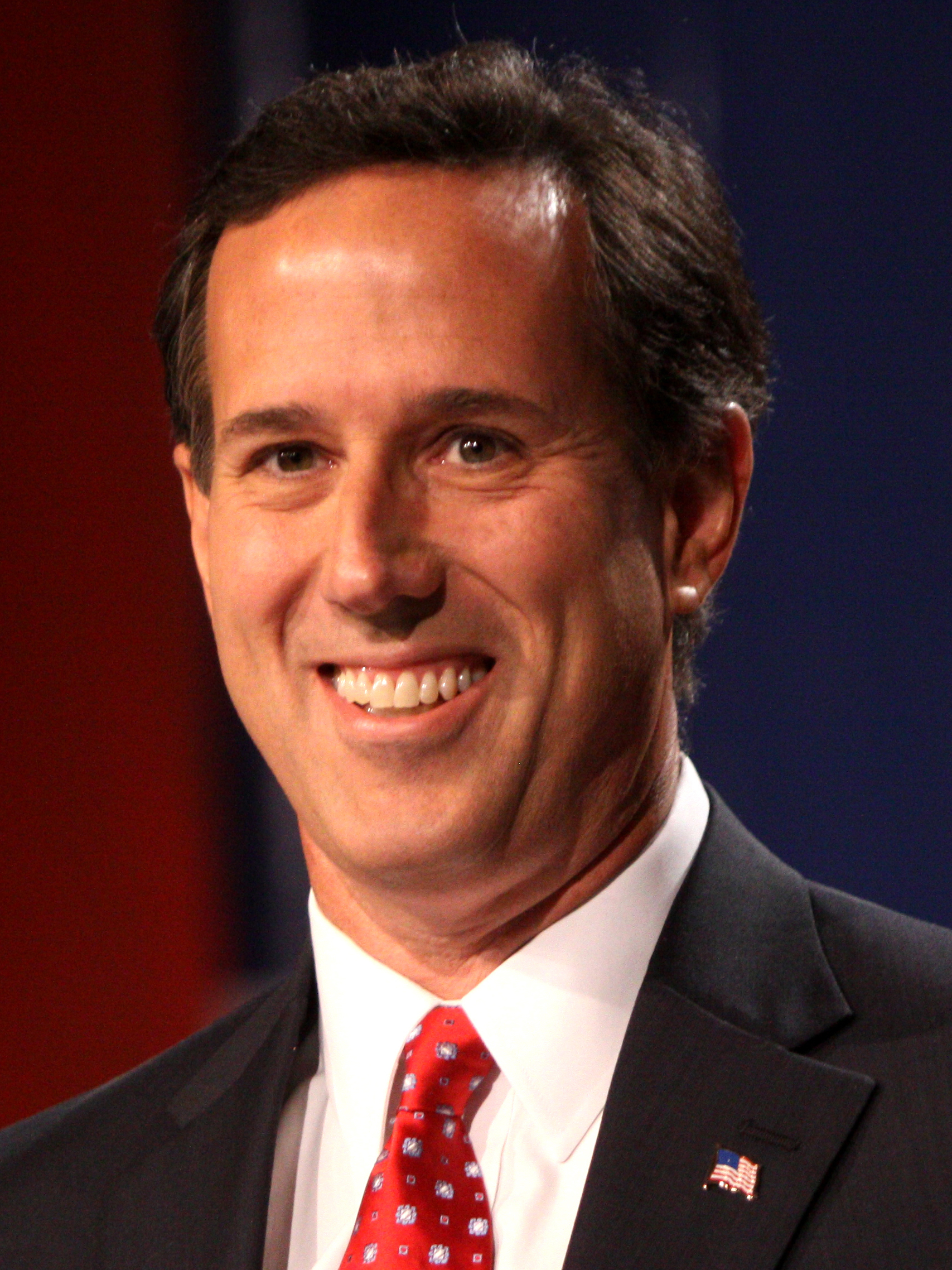

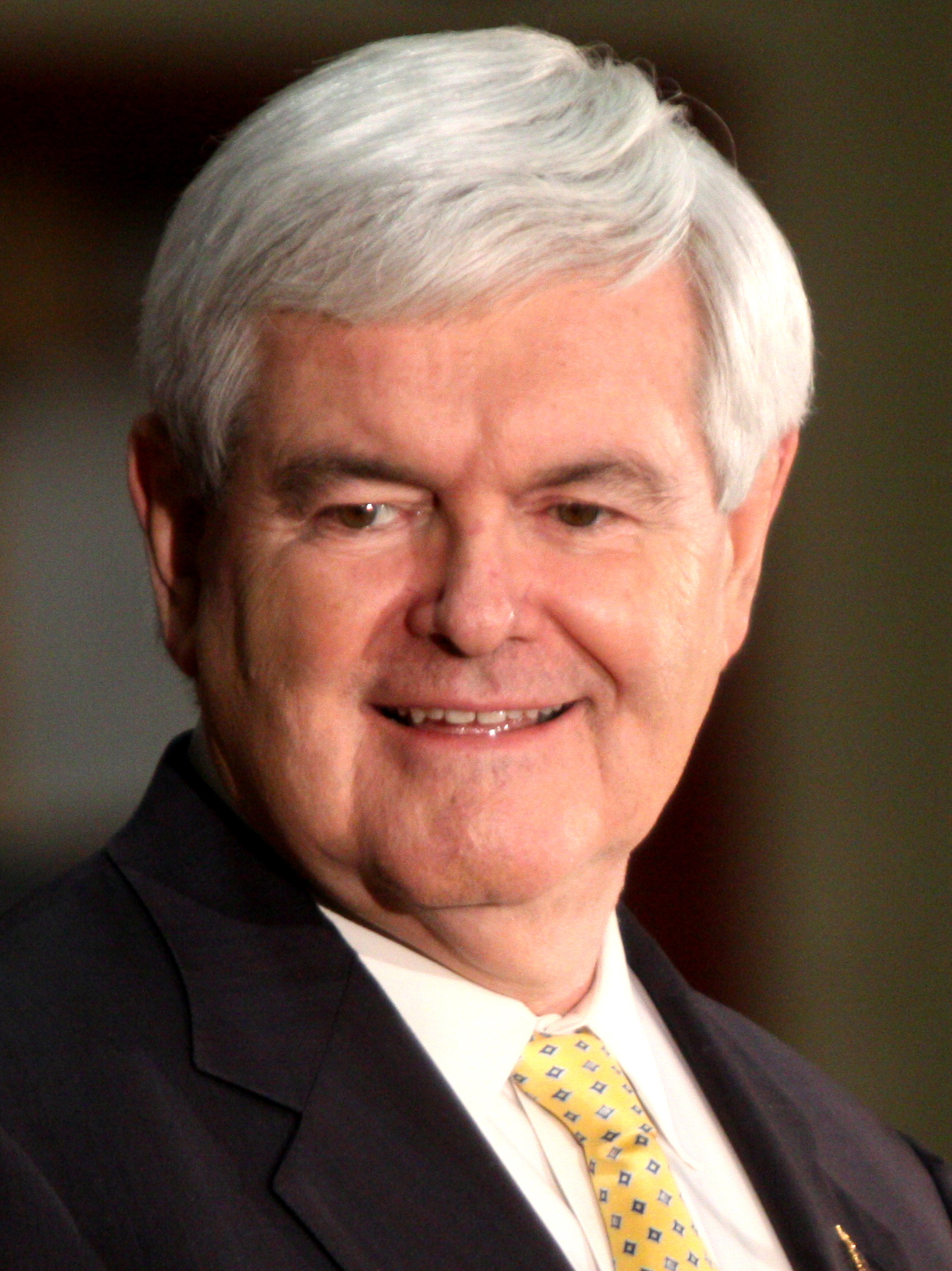
Candidate	Mitt Romney	Ron Paul	Jon Huntsman
Home state	Massachusetts	Texas	Utah
Delegate count	7	3	2
Popular vote	97,591	56,872	41,964
Percentage	39.28%	22.89%	16.89%
Candidate	Rick Santorum	Newt Gingrich
Home state	Pennsylvania	Georgia
Delegate count	0	0
Popular vote	23,432	23,421
Percentage	9.43%	9.43%

Mitt Romney Ron Paul	Jon Huntsman N/A
Romney: 20–30% 30–40% 40–50%
Paul: 30–40%

The 2012 New Hampshire Republican presidential primary took place on Tuesday, January 10, 2012. Former Massachusetts Governor Mitt Romney won the primary.

== Background and campaign ==
In the 2008 Republican nomination contest, Mitt Romney's campaign invested heavily in the New Hampshire, but ultimately came up short to eventual nominee John McCain.

In 2012, Romney, Texas Congressman Ron Paul, former Utah Governor Jon Huntsman, former Speaker of the House Newt Gingrich, and former Pennsylvania Senator Rick Santorum were heavily contesting and campaigning in the New Hampshire primary.

Though Santorum ultimately won the Iowa Caucus on January 3, it was believed at the time that Romney had won by 8 votes.

Televised debates in New Hampshire were held on January 7, 2012, on ABC News at Saint Anselm College and the following morning on January 8, 2012, on NBC's Meet the Press and MSNBC. All major Republican candidates attended both debates.

== Ballot ==
In 2012, a record 33 Republican candidates filed to appear on the ballot in New Hampshire, including various single-issue activists, protest candidates, and perennial candidates. For instance, Stewart Greenleaf, who had no interest in becoming president, registered for the ballot to promote the issue of government spending in the Republican Party. Under New Hampshire's lenient ballot access laws, a candidate is only required to pay $1,000 to the state's treasury, and needs no party approval or petitions for placement.

== Endorsements ==
=== Newspapers ===
Various newspapers that circulate widely in New Hampshire made endorsements ahead of the New Hampshire primary. While the conservative Union Leader, the only statewide newspaper, endorsed Gingrich, various newspapers endorsed Huntsman, with the Valley News stating that Huntsman was "a candidate whose views are solidly conservative, but not myopically so" and criticizing Romney and Gingrich, stating that "The former has raised the flip-flop to an art form, while the latter has done the same for hypocrisy" and endorsing Huntsman "in the hopes that the cooler heads will prevail in New Hampshire and elsewhere." Romney also received support, including from The Portsmouth Herald of the Seacoast Region.

- The New Hampshire Union Leader endorsed Gingrich on November 27.
- Foster's Daily Democrat endorsed Romney on December 4.
- The Portsmouth Herald and Seacoast Media Group endorsed Romney on December 18.
- The Keene Sentinel endorsed Huntsman on December 18.
- The Valley News endorsed Huntsman on December 18.
- The Conway Daily Sun endorsed Romney on December 21.
- The Concord Monitor endorsed Huntsman on December 22.
- The Boston Herald endorsed Romney.
- The Salmon Press Newspapers group (the Littleton Courier, Berlin Reporter, and Coos County Democrat) endorsed Paul on January 4.
- The Nashua Telegraph endorsed Romney on January 5.
- The Boston Globe endorsed Huntsman on January 6.
- The Eagle-Tribune endorsed Romney on January 6.

=== State politicians ===
Romney led the field in endorsements from New Hampshire Republican elected officials. The New York Times reported that after losing New Hampshire in the 2008 primary to John McCain, Romney devoted considerable time and money to gain the support of New Hampshire Republican figures. Romney's political action committee (PAC) "spread thousands of dollars" to New Hampshire Republican campaigns, including that of youthful Republican state Representative D.J. Bettencourt of the Republican-heavy Salem area, elected state House majority leader in 2011, who is one of Romney's most active supporters. Romney's PAC also donated $25,000 to the New Hampshire Republican State Committee under the chairmanship of prominent New Hampshire party player John H. Sununu, a former governor and White House Chief of Staff. Republican candidates for state Senate and state House, small-town Republican committees, and county sheriffs and district attorneys were all "recipients of [Romney's] largesse." Romney was criticized by some as "buying" endorsements, who referenced "blatantly transactional terms that lie behind the announcements." A large number of officials endorsing Romney, in New Hampshire and in other early primary states, had received contributions first.

By December 11, Romney had already received the endorsement of Ted Gatsas, mayor of Manchester (New Hampshire's largest city) and former state Senate president, and 58 endorsements from state representatives. According to prominent Romney supporter Thomas D. Rath, a former state attorney general described as a Republican power broker, on the eve of the primary the Romney campaign had been endorsed by 11 of 19 Republicans in the State Senate, 73 or 74 of the Republican state representatives, and eight of the 10 sheriffs, as well as the mayor of the largest city. The New York Times reported that so many officials endorsed Romney that it took a three-page pamphlet mailed to New Hampshire Republicans to list them all. The Times reported that Romney-supporting officials "introduce him at virtually every campaign stop, flood gyms and seniors centers with crowds on short notice and attack his Republican rivals."

New Hampshire House Speaker William L. (Bill) O'Brien endorsed Gingrich, while former House speakers George Roberts, Howard Burns, John Tucker, Donna Sytek, and Doug Scamman endorsed Romney. State Senators Jim Forsythe, Andy Sanborn, and Ray White endorsed Ron Paul.

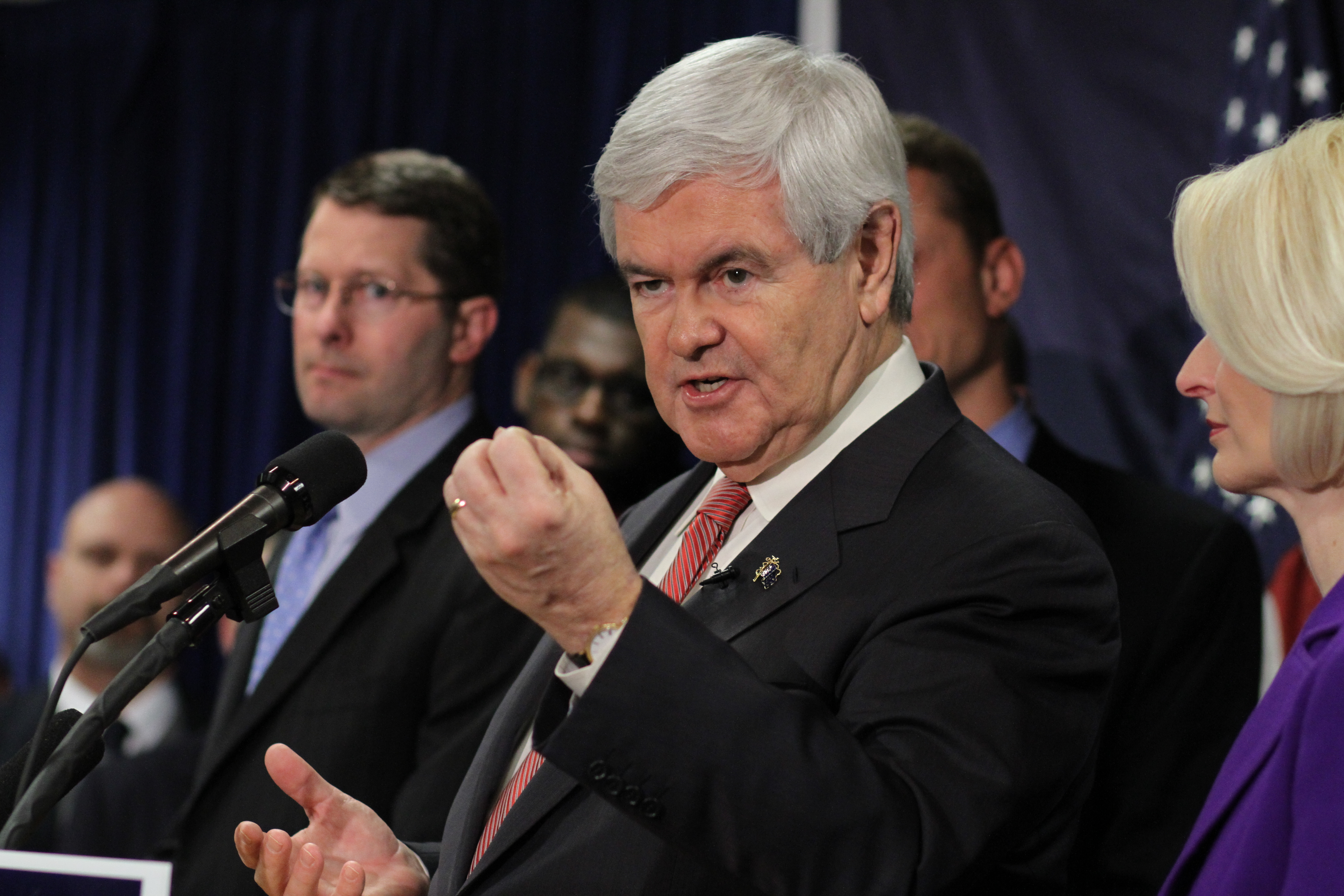
Newt Gingrich campaigning in Concord, New Hampshire

=== Federal politicians ===
Of the three Republicans in New Hampshire's congressional delegation, Senator Kelly Ayotte and Representative Charles Bass endorsed Romney, while Frank Guinta declined to endorse a candidate. Executive Council members Raymond S. Burton (who has represented northern New Hampshire since the 1970s), Christopher T. Sununu, and Raymond Wieczorek; State Senate Majority Leader Jeb Bradley, state Senators David Boutin, John Barnes, Jr., Jim Rausch, and Chuck Morse; and former state Senate President Tom Eaton endorsed Romney before December 7. Douglas Dutile, the sheriff of Grafton County, also endorsed Romney.

Senator John McCain of Arizona, who won the New Hampshire Republican primary in 2000 and 2008 and was the Republican nominee for president in 2008, endorsed Romney following the Iowa caucuses and ahead of the New Hampshire primary at a Manchester rally on January 4, despite prior tension between the two in the 2008 primary race.

=== Tea Party ===
After Iowa but before the New Hampshire primaries, tea party movement-aligned Buffalo, New York businessman Carl Paladino, the 2010 gubernatorial candidate in nearby New York, supported Gingrich and sharply criticized the rest of the candidates.

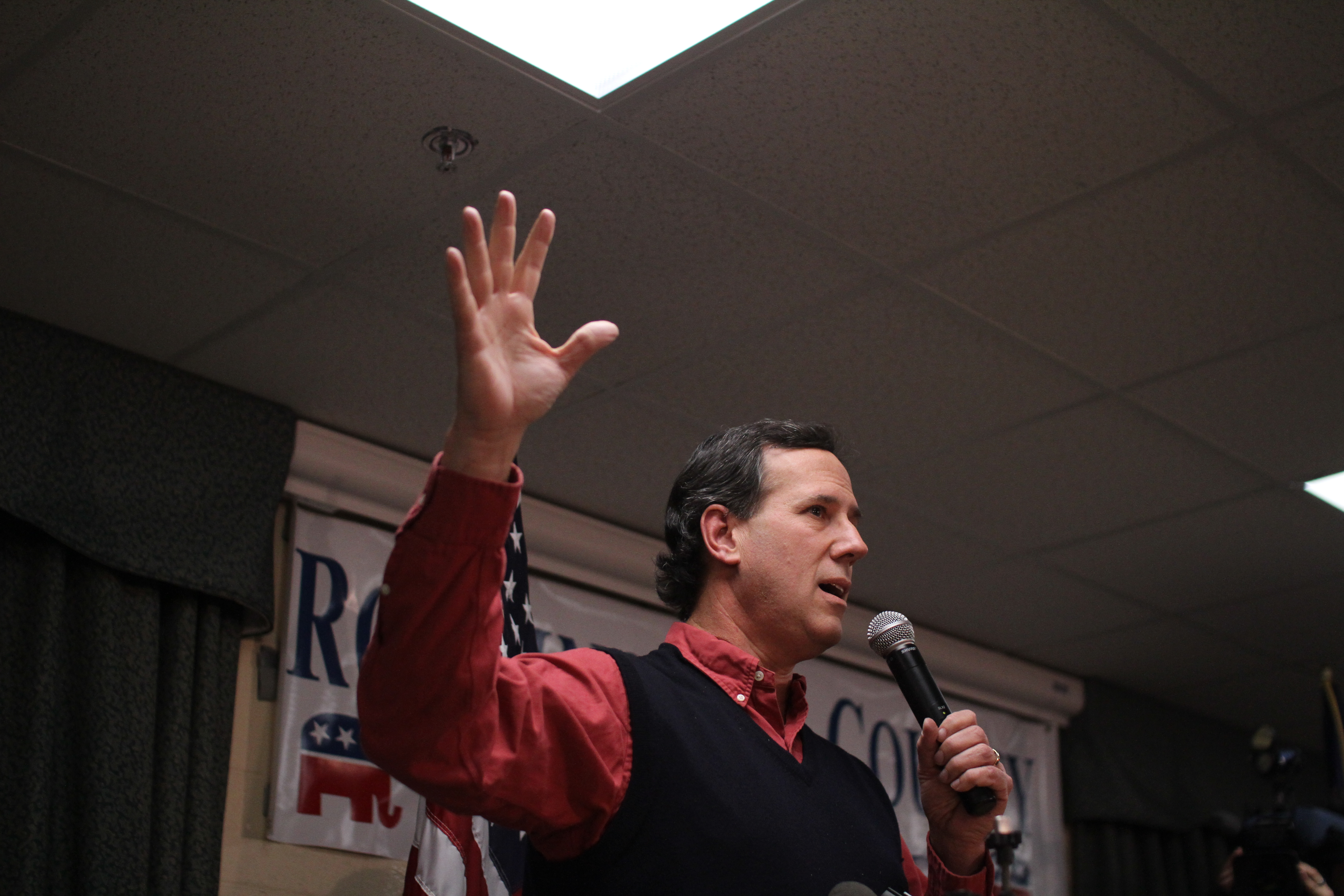
Rick Santorum in New Hampshire during the 2012 Republican primary campaign

== Results ==
Delegates were awarded to candidates who got 10% or more of the vote proportionally.

New Hampshire Republican primary, February 10, 2012 - certified result
Candidate	Votes	Percentage	Projected delegate count		
Candidate	Votes	Percentage	AP	CNN	GP
Mitt Romney	97,591	39.28%	8	8	7
Ron Paul	56,872	22.89%	3	3	3
Jon Huntsman	41,964	16.89%	1	0	2
Rick Santorum	23,432	9.43%	0	0	0
Newt Gingrich	23,421	9.43%	0	0	0
Rick Perry	1,764	0.71%	0	0	0
Buddy Roemer	950	0.38%	0	0	0
Michele Bachmann (withdrawn)	350	0.14%	0	0	0
Fred Karger	345	0.14%	0	0	0
Barack Obama (write-in)	285	0.11%	0	0	0
Kevin Rubash	250	0.10%	0	0	0
Gary Johnson (withdrawn)	181	0.07%	0	0	0
Herman Cain (withdrawn)	161	0.06%	0	0	0
Jeff Lawman	119	0.05%	0	0	0
Chris Hill	108	0.04%	0	0	0
Benjamin Linn	83	0.03%	0	0	0
Michael Meehan	54	0.02%	0	0	0
Keith Drummond	42	0.02%	0	0	0
Rickey Story	42	0.02%	0	0	0
Bear Betzler	29	0.01%	0	0	0
Joe Robinson	25	0.01%	0	0	0
Stewart Greenleaf	24	0.01%	0	0	0
Donald Trump (write-in)	24	0.01%	0	0	0
Sarah Palin (write-in)	23	0.01%	0	0	0
Mark Callahan	20	0.01%	0	0	0
Andy Martin	19	0.01%	0	0	0
Linden Swift	18	0.01%	0	0	0
Tim Brewer	15	0.01%	0	0	0
Vern Wuensche	15	0.01%	0	0	0
L. John Davis	14	0.01%	0	0	0
Randy Crow	12	0.00%	0	0	0
Vermin Supreme (write-in)	4	0.00%	0	0	0
James Vestermark	3	0.00%	0	0	0
Hugh Cort	3	0.00%	0	0	0
Other Write-ins	213	0.09%	0	0	0
Total:	248,475	100.00%	12	11	12
