= Al Sharpton 2004 presidential campaign =

American political campaign

Al Sharpton 2004
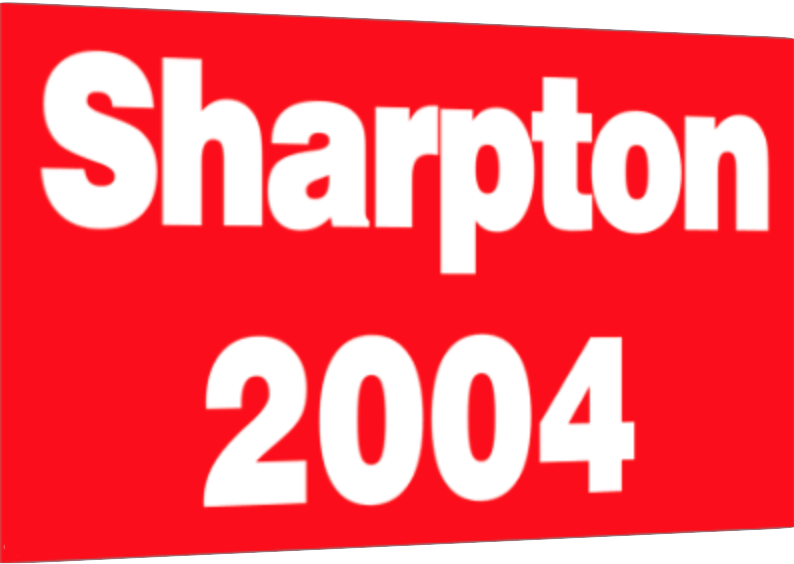
- Campaign: 2004 United States presidential election
- Candidate: Al Sharpton; Activist
- Affiliation: Democratic Party

Website
- sharptonexplore2004.com (archived - October 31, 2003)

The 2004 presidential campaign of Al Sharpton, a civil rights activist from New York City, began with his expressed interest in May 2001. In August of that year, Sharpton announced the formation of an exploratory committee and began to campaign for the nomination of the Democratic Party. Sharpton had previously run for several elected offices throughout the 1990s, and many news outlets reported on how Sharpton was unlikely to gain the Democratic nomination, with some arguing that the primary point of his campaign was to raise his profile. Sharpton claimed that, while he was running with the intent to win, it was more important to him that his campaign help raise issues primarily concerning the African American community, regardless of whether he received the nomination or not.

In January 2003, Sharpton officially announced his candidacy and campaigned extensively in the state of South Carolina. However, following a poor showing at the South Carolina primaries, Sharpton announced that he was supporting eventual Democratic nominee John Kerry. However, Sharpton continued to campaign until the Democratic National Convention, where he gave a keynote speech.

== Background ==
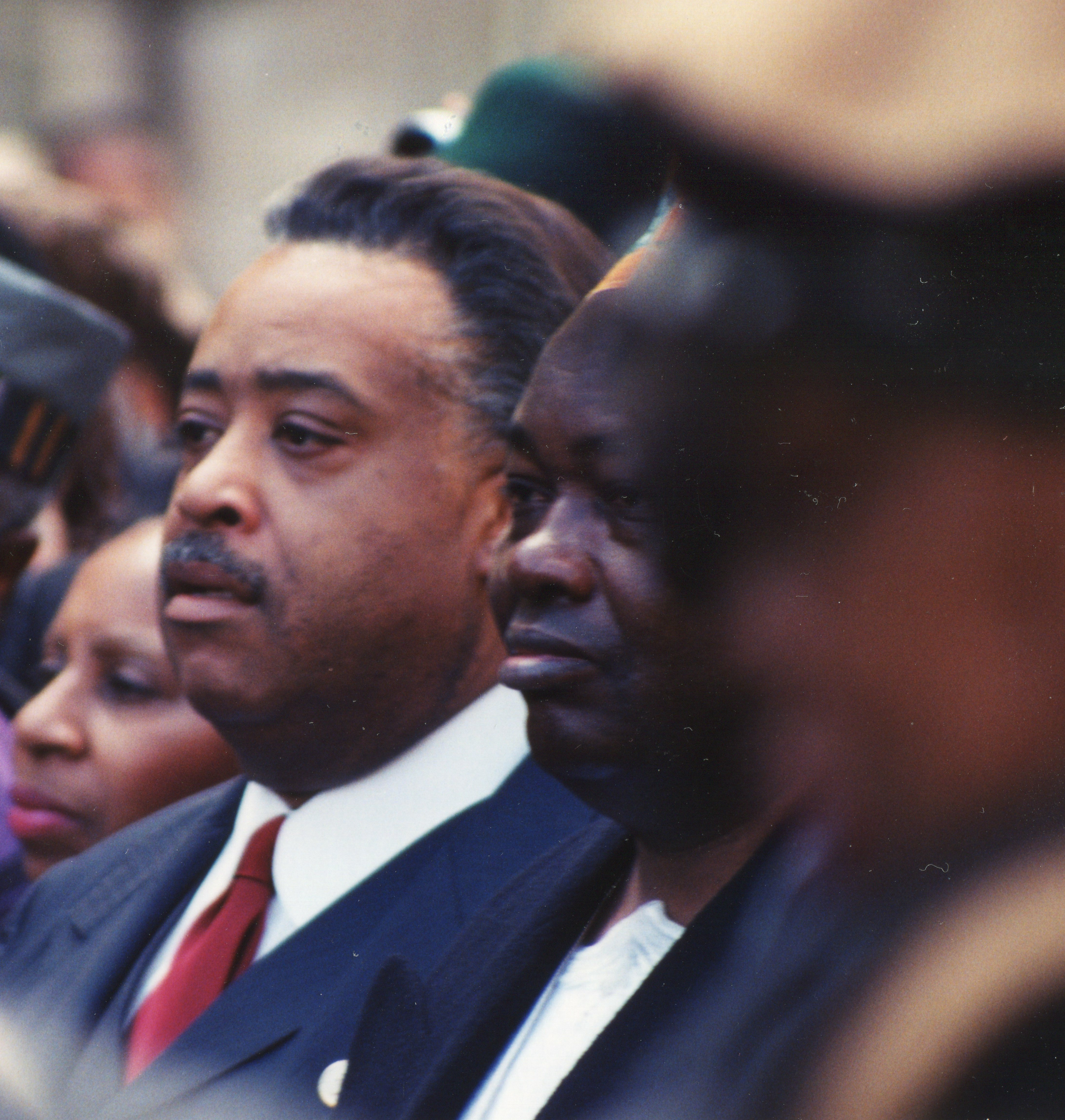
Al Sharpton in March 2000

Al Sharpton was born in New York City in 1954. At an early age, he took an interest in religion and was ordained as a Pentecostal minister at the age of 10. In his teenage years, he became involved in politics and activism, and in 1969, he was named the youth director for Operation Breadbasket by civil rights activist Jesse Jackson. In 1972, Sharpton served as the youth director for Shirley Chisholm's 1972 presidential campaign and that same decade he formed the National Youth Movement. Throughout the 1980s, Sharpton became more well known for organizing protests on various issues, and in 1987, he reached national attention for advocating in support of Tawana Brawley, a woman who alleged that six white police officers had raped her. A grand jury later ruled the allegations a hoax and Sharpton was later charged with defamation of an assistant district attorney who had been involved in the case. In 1991, Sharpton founded the civil rights organization the National Action Network (NAN).

Al Sharpton's first political campaign was in the 1992 United States Senate election in New York, in which he placed third in the Democratic Party primaries. He then ran in the Democratic primaries for the 1994 United States Senate election in New York, which he again lost. In the 1997 New York City mayoral election primaries, Sharpton lost, but garnered almost enough votes to force a runoff election. In 2000, Sharpton again expressed interest in running in the 2001 New York City mayoral election, going as far as stating in December that he was forming an exploratory committee for that reason. However, Sharpton ultimately chose to instead endorse Bronx Borough President Fernando Ferrer in the primaries.

== Early stages ==
=== Expressed interest ===
In a May 2001 interview with Time, Sharpton expressed interest in running for President of the United States, stating, "I feel that the Democratic Party must be challenged in 2004 because it didn't fight aggressively to protect our voting rights in Florida. I think we need to look at running a black in the primary. I have said I would be available to do it." (Note: The comment regarding Florida is in reference to the controversy surrounding the 2000 United States presidential election recount in Florida.) The article compared Sharpton's possible run to Jesse Jackson's 1984 presidential campaign and argued that Sharpton and Jackson were rivals "in the struggle for the leadership of black America". A May 2001 article on Salon.com compared it to Pat Buchanan's 1992 campaign, implying that it could lead to vote splitting within the Democratic Party. Later that month, Sharpton was sentenced to 90 days in jail for his participation in protests against the U.S. Navy in Vieques, Puerto Rico. An August 2001 article in The Economist stated that while it was unlikely that he would win the Democratic nomination, Sharpton could earn enough support to give him leverage with whoever the eventual nominee would be, a sentiment supported by a report published by the Associated Press (AP). Talking about his prospects from his jail cell, Sharpton said, "I think people want moral leadership even if they don't agree with their leaders all the time. People are tired of politicians who won't sacrifice themselves for what they believe. The worst that could happen is our issues will get out there. The best that could happen is I could become the Democratic Party's nominee." On August 17, Sharpton was released from the Metropolitan Detention Center, Brooklyn, during which time he had been visited by several politicians, including Jackson, U.S. Senators Hillary Clinton and Chuck Schumer, and former Atlanta Mayor Maynard Jackson.

=== Exploratory committee ===
I think that we must deal with the abandonment of progressive ideas of some of the leadership of the Democratic Party and the need to force this party to clarify its position on things like public education, the criminal justice system and international policy.

— Al Sharpton talking to BBC News, August 20, 2001

Speaking at the Washington Press Club on August 20, 2001, Sharpton announced that he had asked Harvard University Professor Cornel West to form an exploratory committee by November for a possible 2004 campaign. During his speech, Sharpton expressed concern with the movement of the Democratic Party to the right of the political spectrum and again noted the controversial results of the 2000 U.S. presidential election in Florida, which he said was disenfranchisement of African Americans. Sharpton also spoke about the divided state of the African American voting bloc and stated that "progressive leadership is in a deep crisis at the moment in the Democratic Party and outside". According to Sharpton, the point of the exploratory committee would be to find "a strategy that would lead toward making sure the unheard and the unnoticed are both heard and paid attention to". Additionally, he stated that the focus of his campaign would be on criminal justice reform and electoral reform. At the time of his announcement, BBC News reported that it was unlikely that Sharpton would win the nomination, but that he could become a power broker within the party, a claim that was repeated in several major news outlets. However, journalist Dan Collins stated that, given Sharpton's experience in public policy, his campaign might prove to be more successful than expected. By 2002, the exploratory committee included other notable individuals such as former New Jersey Senate member Sharpe James and Harvard Law School professor Charles Ogletree and entrepreneur Russell Simmons.

=== Alleged smear campaign ===
On September 23, 2002, multiple news sources reported on a Federal Bureau of Investigation (FBI) surveillance tape from 1983 that had surfaced showing Sharpton talking to an undercover agent about a drug deal. The video, which was to be broadcast on HBO's Real Sports with Bryant Gumbel that night, was part of an investigation into boxing promoter Don King's connections with organized crime and showed Sharpton talking to mobster Michael Franzese and an undercover agent posing as a businessman from Latin America. While the group initially talked about boxing and entertainment promotion, the conversation turned to a cocaine deal that the businessman could include Sharpton in. Sharpton later stated that he was caught off guard and scared by the man, in part because he didn't know if he was armed, and so he agreed to what the person was saying and left. Ultimately, no drug deal came from the conversation. A 1988 article in New York Newsday claimed that the FBI used the tape as leverage to get Sharpton to act as an informant for them, which Sharpton has denied. Sharpton also alleged that the tape had been leaked by law enforcement officials as a smear campaign to hurt his presidential campaign. The following day, BBC News reported that Sharpton's lawyer would be filing a lawsuit against HBO alleging $500 million in damages. However, news reports from the same day claimed that Sharpton was seeking $1 billion in damages in a suit filed with the New York Supreme Court. Sharpton alleged that the people who aired the tape "intentionally and maliciously distorted something that ended in an abrupt 'No'" and that there was a second tape not shown by HBO that showed him telling the undercover agent, "Don't ever talk to us about a drug deal". A representative for HBO at the time stated that the lawsuit was "so silly that it is unworthy of comment" while defending the journalistic integrity of the show. Sharpton claimed that the alleged smear campaign could actually help his campaign, as it would vindicate his claims that people within the government were intentionally trying to hurt his success.

=== Late 2002 ===
By October 2002, Sharpton was the only Democratic candidate with an exploratory committee. In an interview with CBS News that month, he said that he would make a decision by the end of summer 2003 and that while he was leaning towards running, he wanted to make sure that his campaign would bring about some gains even if he was not chosen as the Democratic nominee. He also stated that he was not ruling out the option of running as a third party candidate if he did not win the nomination. In a December 2002 interview with the Hartford Courant, Sharpton talked about some of the additional focuses of his campaign, which included defending affirmative action, expanding Medicare coverage for prescription drugs, and opposing a possible war in Iraq.

== Campaign developments ==
=== Official candidacy ===
According to a January 2003 article by the AP, Sharpton filed paperwork with the Federal Election Commission on December 31, 2002, that officially marked his entry into the race. (Note: This AP report was published by CBS News on January 3, 2003. However, that same day, journalist Dan Balz of The Washington Post reported that Sharpton "may also seek the Democratic nomination".) The AP also reported that on January 5, Sharpton announced his presidential run and campaigned the following day in Boston. By this point, there were already several notable contenders for the Democratic nomination, including U.S. Senators John Edwards, John Kerry, and Joe Lieberman, U.S. Representative Dick Gephardt, and former Governor of Vermont Howard Dean. At the time of his announcement, pollsters expressed pessimism at Sharpton's chances of winning the nomination, with an article published later that month in The New York Times stating that Sharpton was "trailing in the presidential campaign". However, a January 13 article by journalist Adam Nagourney in The New York Times stated that Sharpton had potential to do well in the race and reported that he was planning to form an exploratory committee on January 21. Following this, news sources reported that Sharpton would officially announce his candidacy in the spring. (Note: The creation of this exploratory committee seems to contradict earlier reports of a Sharpton exploratory committee from 2002. For example, Sharpton mentions his exploratory committee in a November 2002 interview with Salon.com, while a CBS News article published the previous month claimed that Sharpton was the only Democratic candidate with an exploratory committee.) The same day that the exploratory committee was created, Jackson and the five other Democratic candidates all attended an event at the Omni Shoreham Hotel in Washington, D.C., held by NARAL Pro-Choice America in celebration of the 30th anniversary of the Roe v. Wade ruling. NARAL President Kate Michelman called it "the first major gathering of the announced presidential hopefuls on the Democratic side".

On January 22, the day after Sharpton filed to create an exploratory committee, a fire destroyed his campaign headquarters building, which also served as the headquarters for the NAN. While official reports stated that the fire was caused by an electrical issue, some of Sharpton's supporters alleged that the fire was caused by arson, which had been ruled out by the chief fire marshal. On May 3, Sharpton participated in the first Democratic Party presidential debate for the 2004 election in Columbia, South Carolina. At the time, he was polling at less than 5 percent.

In a July 2003 interview on Face the Nation, Sharpton expressed support for reparations for slavery and criticized then-President George W. Bush for his handling of the war in Iraq. He also stated that a cornerstone of his campaign would include three amendments to the U.S. Constitution that would strengthen the right to vote and codify the right to health care and the right to education. An article that same month in the Los Angeles Times stated that while Sharpton was still polling low and had raised only an approximate $114,000, a recent Gallup Poll placed him first among African American voters, at 24 percent support. On July 12, The New York Times reported that Sharpton was undergoing an income tax audit focusing on several years in the 1990s and that many of the records pertaining to this time were lost in the fire that destroyed his headquarters. The following month, Slate published an article discussing some of Sharpton's foreign policy stances, which included taking a more amicable approach towards African and Latin American nations and a criticism of the United States as a global policeman.

=== Debates and hosting Saturday Night Live ===
In September, Sharpton was unable to attend a presidential debate in Albuquerque, New Mexico, due to a weather-caused flight delay. However, The Washington Post published an article at that time that highlighted several other instances when Sharpton was late in arriving to political forums and events. Later that month, Sharpton would participate in debates in Baltimore (September 9) and New York City (September 25). That same month, NBC News reported on Sharpton's campaigning in Southern United States, particularly South Carolina, calling it a "Southern strategy" compared to other candidates' focus on states with early primaries, such as Iowa and New Hampshire. A South Carolina newspaper during this time claimed that Sharpton had visited South Carolina more times at this point in the race than any other Democratic candidate. On September 30, The New York Times published an article stating that Sharpton's campaign was in "disarray", noting that both his national campaign manager and his South Carolina coordinator had both resigned. Several weeks later, The New York Times reported that Sharpton's "campaign has little in the way of organization or infrastructure, relying largely on the generosity of a few wealthy donors".

On October 2, CBS News reported that in Democratic presidential opinion polls, Wesley Clark lead with 14 percent of respondents, while Sharpton was polling at 3 percent, near the bottom of the list of candidates. Sharpton polled low in several other categories as well, though he polled best with the question of who the respondents "haven't heard" of. Later that month, after it was reported that Jackson was expected to back Howard Dean for the nomination, Sharpton accused Dean of running on an "anti-black agenda" and claimed that he supported the National Rifle Association of America and capital punishment while opposing affirmative action. Dean later denied that he opposed affirmative action. That month, Sharpton also participated in debates in Phoenix, Arizona (October 9) and Detroit (October 26), while the following month, he participated in debates in Boston (November 4) and Des Moines, Iowa (November 24). In early December, commenting on Sharpton's overall performance in the debates, University of Maryland professor Ron Walters said, "He has stood out in the debates, someone who is quick-witted, who sort of makes people laugh, who has a dominating personality in terms of dealing with crisis when they arise in the debate format. I think a lot of that plays to his acumen as a Baptist preacher and somebody who's very comfortable in this kind of a setting."

In early November, a number of news sources reported that Sharpton had been contracted to host the December 6 episode of Saturday Night Live on NBC. According to Sharpton, show producer Lorne Michaels told him that his appearance would be apolitical, and an aide for Sharpton stated that the campaign was not helping Sharpton prepare for the show. However, an article published in The New York Times at this time claimed that the show was "a vehicle that, while not a proven vote getter, certainly brings him nationwide attention". On December 5, CNN reported that NBC affiliates in several states may opt out of showing the episode out of concern for adhering to the equal-time rule set forth by the Federal Communications Commission. All four NBC affiliates in Iowa opted out of airing the episode, which featured Sharpton in skits portraying Johnnie Cochran and one of the biblical magi. Several days later, Sharpton participated in a debate at the University of New Hampshire (December 9).

=== Early 2004 ===
In early January 2004, journalist Michael Slackman of The New York Times reported discrepancies in the Sharpton campaign's finances and again noted Sharpton's ongoing audit and previous incidents of financial mismanagement on Sharpton's behalf. Later that month, the newspaper reported that noted conservative political consultant Roger Stone was involved with the Sharpton campaign in an undisclosed manner. Stone previously served as a consultant with Republican presidential candidates including Richard Nixon, Ronald Reagan, and Bush. Around the same time, alternative newspaper The Village Voice reported on the relationship, noting that Stone had helped the campaign apply for matching funds with the Federal Election Commission (FEC) and aided in staffing. The Village Voice criticized the relationship and alleged that Stone may have had ulterior motives in aiding Sharpton, while Salon.com claimed that Stone's involvement in the campaign "should disgust his [Sharpton's] constituents". Through the month, Sharpton continued to campaign extensively in South Carolina. However, in the aftermath of the South Carolina primary, Sharpton did not receive a single delegate and did not receive a significant amount of the African American vote.

=== Withdrawal and Democratic National Convention ===
On March 15, Sharpton announced that he was endorsing Democratic front-runner Kerry for president, but he would still continue his own campaign "to promote issues of concern to minority voters". Later that month, the FEC announced they were initiating a process to suspend matching funds for Sharpton's campaign due to rules violations. In June, Sharpton attended the Democratic National Convention as a speaker, wherein he attacked Bush and promoted the Democratic nominee. His speech garnered a standing ovation.

== Aftermath ==
In December 2005, Sharpton agreed to pay back over $100,000 in matching funds he had received during the campaign. In November 2008, Politico reported that the FEC had fined Sharpton close to half a million dollars due to illegal contributions he had received during the campaign. Throughout the 2010s and 2020s, several conservative news outlets reported that Sharpton was approximately $900,000 in debt from expenses related to the campaign.

== Bibliography ==
- Ceaser, James W.; Busch, Andrew E. (2005). Red Over Blue: The 2004 Elections and American Politics. Rowman & Littlefield. ISBN 978-0-7425-3497-1 – via Google Books.
- Denton Jr., Robert E., ed. (2005). The 2004 Presidential Campaign: A Communication Perspective. Rowman & Littlefield. ISBN 978-0-7425-3571-8 – via Google Books.
- Walters, Ronald W. (2005). Freedom is Not Enough: Black Voters, Black Candidates, and American Presidential Politics. Rowman & Littlefield. ISBN 978-0-7425-4806-0 – via Google Books.
