= Henry Hewes (politician) =

American political candidate (born 1949)

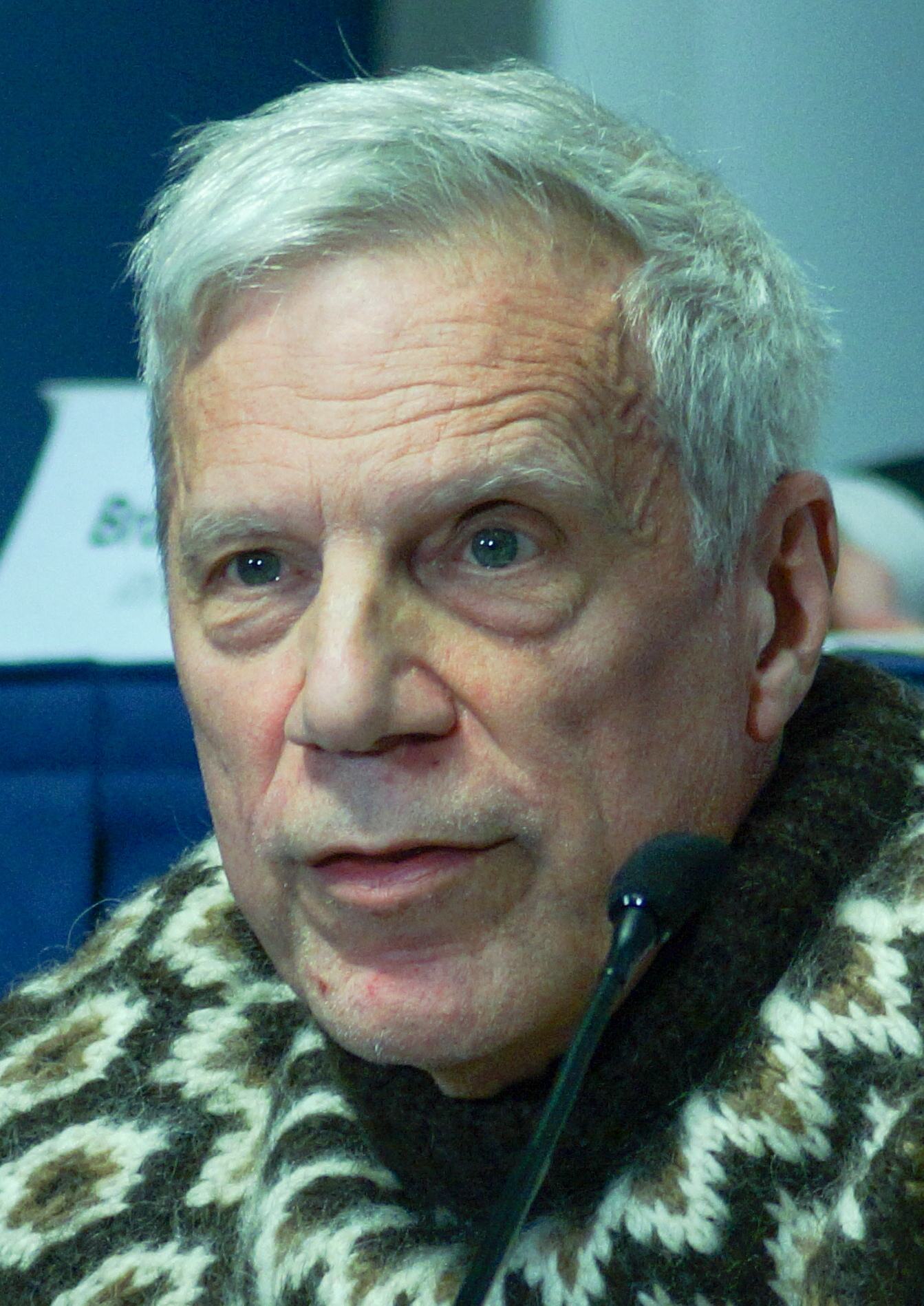
- Hewes at the 2016 Lesser-Known Candidates Forum

Personal details
- Born: May 21, 1949 (age 77)
- Party: Democratic (2004–present); Republican (before 2004)
- Other political affiliations: Right to Life (1989, 1994); Conservative (1994)
- Parent: Henry Hewes (father)

Henry F. Hewes (born May 21, 1949) is an American real estate developer and political candidate. Throughout his career, he ran for Mayor of New York City and for the U.S. Senate as the nominee of the Right to Life Party. He served on the presidential campaigns of numerous Republican politicians.

In 2012, 2016, and in 2020, Hewes announced that he would run as a Democratic presidential candidate.

== Early life and education ==
The son of Jane Fowle and theater critic Henry Hewes, Hewes studied at State University of New York and Hunter College, where he was Hubert Humphrey Fellow. He became a nationally known economic development consultant at Stern and Hewes, and he also served on the Board of the Dalton School, the City Club of New York, and the Mitchell-Lama Association. He was formerly a newspaper publisher of The Washington Chronicle before moving into real estate development, specializing in low-income housing, schools, and medical facilities.

== Political career ==
Hewes worked as a regional and state director for a number of presidential campaigns. He supported Pat Robertson, Pat Buchanan and George H. W. Bush in their respective campaigns for president. After serving in administrative roles, he ran for Mayor of New York City as the nominee of the Right to Life Party in 1989. He participated in all five mayoral debates, and was described in the press as the winner of the debates. Pete Hamill described him as the intellectual winner of the debates. He finished in third position in the election, behind David Dinkins and Rudy Giuliani. He ran for U.S. Senate in 1994, as the Right to Life Party candidate, and lost the Conservative party nomination to Bernadette Castro in a closely held and very bitter primary. In the general election, he finished third behind Daniel Patrick Moynihan and Castro. In 2016, Hewes ran for president, representing himself as the Pro-Life Democratic candidate in the race; in 2020, he again ran for the Democratic nomination.

== Political positions ==
In 2005, Hewes described his political stances as "eclectic", noting his opposition to the War in Iraq, the USA Patriot Act, and the death penalty. He favored small government, the rights of all citizens to bear arms, and a number of other conservative causes, as well as being a strong opponent of the 58 million abortions since 1973. He described himself as Pro-Life candidate speaking for those who lacked the ability to defend themselves. He also favored raising the minimum wage, . and the deregulation of the housing market in New York City. He also favored changes in Social Security to strengthen the Social Security program in the future, and to avoid reductions in benefits. He also favored reorganization of the health insurance program in the United States to cover all individuals.

In an interview with Rolling Stone Hewes questioned the opinion of a number of politicians who were untroubled by the 58 million aborted children since 1973. He stated that the lack of empathy for the deaths of the unborn was a stain upon the American public debate. He also stated that his Pro-Life position caused him to be against any form of capital punishment.

According to Hewes, the greatest problem the United States has is that 50% of the population live at the edge of poverty. He has often stated that this situation impacts upon the stability of the American political situation. He currently serves as chairman of the Low Income Housing Coalition, Harmony Alliance, the Coalition to Restrict Access to Pornography on the Internet, and the Coalition for Legal Immigration to the United States.
