= Al Sharpton =

American Baptist minister, activist and talk show host (born 1954)

The Reverend Al Sharpton
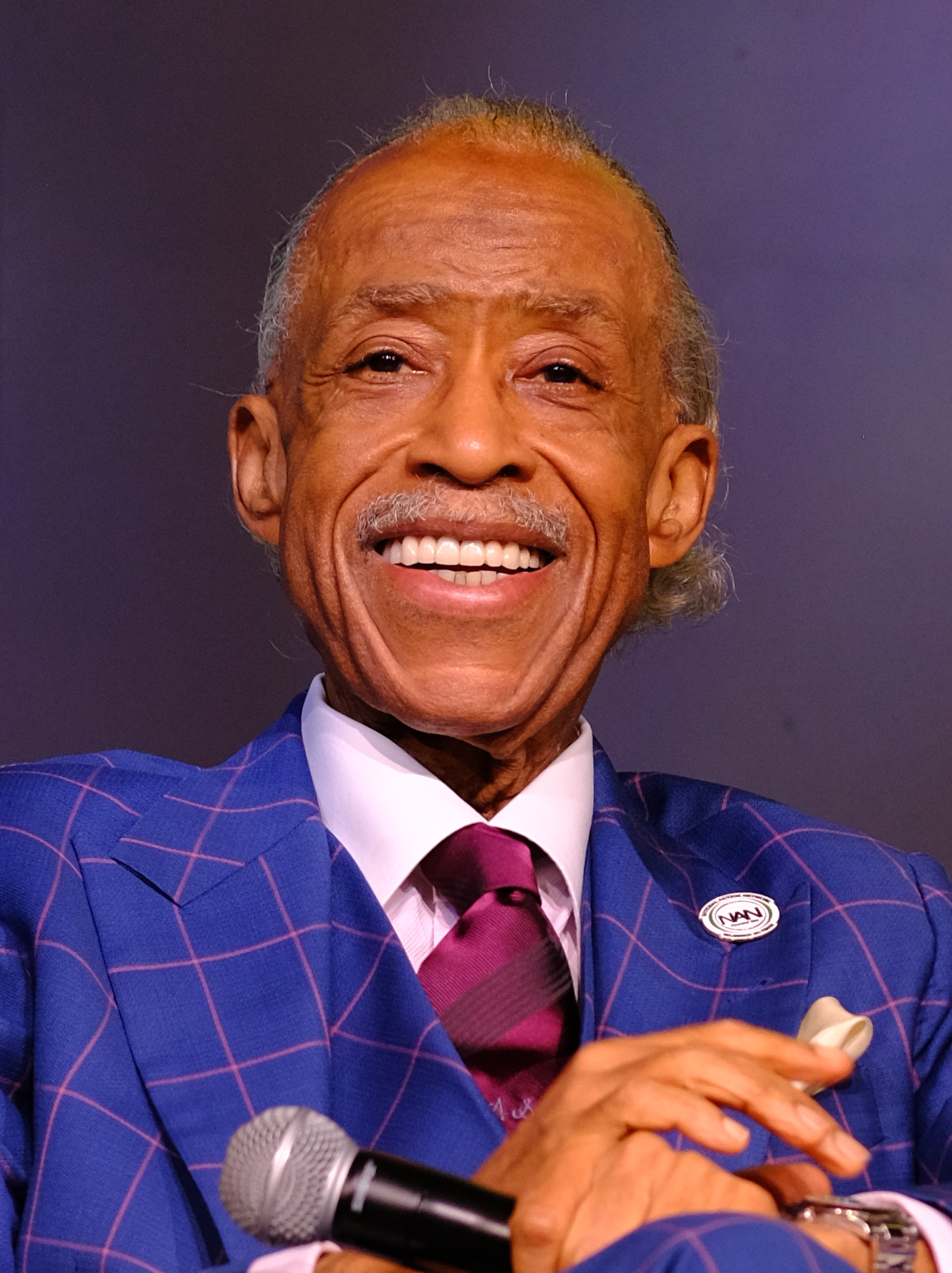
- Sharpton in 2025
- Born: Alfred Charles Sharpton Jr. October 3, 1954 (age 72); New York City, U.S.
- Occupations: Baptist minister Civil rights/social justice activist Radio and television talk show host
- Years active: 1969–present
- Political party: Democratic
- Spouses: Marsha Tinsley (less than a year); Kathy Jordan (m. 1980; sep. 2004)
- Children: 2

Alfred Charles Sharpton Jr. (born October 3, 1954) is an American civil rights and social justice activist, Baptist minister, radio talk show host, and TV personality, who is also the founder of the National Action Network civil rights organization. In 2004, he was a candidate for the Democratic nomination for the U.S. presidential election. He hosts a weekday radio talk show, Keepin' It Real, which is nationally syndicated by Urban One, and he is a political analyst and weekend host for MS NOW, hosting PoliticsNation.

Sharpton is known for making various controversial and incendiary comments over his career. He has been accused of making racially insensitive remarks as well as inciting incidents of violence. In 1987, he was highly active in publicizing the Tawana Brawley rape hoax in the media; the allegation was later proven to be false.

== Early life ==
Alfred Charles Sharpton Jr. was born on October 3, 1954, in the Brownsville neighborhood of Brooklyn, New York City, to Ada (née Richards) (1925–2012) and Alfred Charles Sharpton Sr. (1931–2024). Sharpton has Cherokee roots. He preached his first sermon at the age of four and toured with gospel singer Mahalia Jackson.

In 1963, Sharpton's father left his wife to have a relationship with Sharpton's half-sister. Ada took a job as a maid, but her income was so low that the family qualified for welfare and had to move from middle class Hollis, Queens, to the public housing projects in the Brownsville neighborhood of Brooklyn.

At the age of twelve, he would meet Rev. Jesse Jackson, who would become his mentor. In 2026 upon Jackson's passing, Sharpton stated that Jackson was the person who "called me into purpose." Jackson would later appoint Sharpton as the youth director of the Brooklyn branch of Operation Breadbasket, the economic arm of the Southern Christian Leadership Conference founded by Dr. Martin Luther King Jr., in 1969. A claim which Sharpton made about meeting Martin Luther King Jr., who was assassinated in 1968, has not been supported by historical evidence. However, he was acknowledged to have been mentored in his teenage year by both Jackson and Rev. William Jones (1934–2006). In 2017, Sharpton credited Jackson, Rev. Herb Daughtry, and Rev. Calvin Morris (1941–2023) as the people who "started my activism."

Sharpton graduated from Samuel J. Tilden High School in Brooklyn, and attended Brooklyn College, dropping out after two years in 1975. In 1972, he accepted the position of youth director for the presidential campaign of Congresswoman Shirley Chisholm.

== Time as James Brown tour manager and impact ==
Between 1973 and 1980, Sharpton served as James Brown's tour manager. Through this position, he would gain more prominence, and would even make a nationally televised appearance with Brown on an episode of Soul Train in 1974. Brown is acknowledged to have been a major mentor to Sharpton, with the FBI even describing Sharpton as a "protege of Brown" during Sharpton's time as an FBI informant. In an interview with The Guardian in December 2022, Sharpton stated it was in fact Brown who motivated him "to do extraordinary things to get attention.” Brown had profound impact on Sharpton, and was even acknowledged to have challenged Sharpton to join him in meeting with U.S. President Ronald Reagan in 1981 to push for a national Martin Luther King Day holiday.

== Activism ==
In 1969, Sharpton was appointed by Jesse Jackson to serve as youth director of the New York City branch of Operation Breadbasket, a group that focused on the promotion of new and better jobs for African Americans.

In 1971, Sharpton founded the National Youth Movement to raise resources for impoverished youth.

Despite his early life activism, Sharpton has stated it was in fact singer James Brown, who he befriended in 1971 and later became tour manager of, who taught him to "be dramatic in order to get people to see things that they are not inclined to see." With Brown's advice, Sharpton began using the first name "Al" rather than his legal name "Alfred".

=== Bernhard Goetz ===
Bernhard Goetz shot four African-American men on a New York City Subway 2 train in Manhattan on December 22, 1984, when they approached him and tried to rob him. At his trial Goetz was acquitted of all charges except for carrying an unlicensed firearm. Sharpton led several marches protesting what he saw as the weak prosecution of the case. Sharpton and other civil rights leaders said Goetz's actions were racist and requested a federal civil rights investigation. A federal investigation concluded the shooting was due to an attempted robbery and not race.

=== Howard Beach ===
On December 20, 1986, three African-American men were assaulted in the Howard Beach neighborhood of Queens by a mob of white men. The three men were chased by their attackers onto the Belt Parkway, where one of them, Michael Griffith, was struck and killed by a passing motorist.

A week later, on December 27, Sharpton led 1,200 demonstrators on a march through the streets of Howard Beach. Residents of the neighborhood, who were overwhelmingly white, yelled racial epithets at the protesters, who were largely black. A special prosecutor was appointed by New York Governor Mario Cuomo after the two surviving victims refused to co-operate with the Queens district attorney. Sharpton's role in the case helped propel him to national prominence.

=== Bensonhurst ===
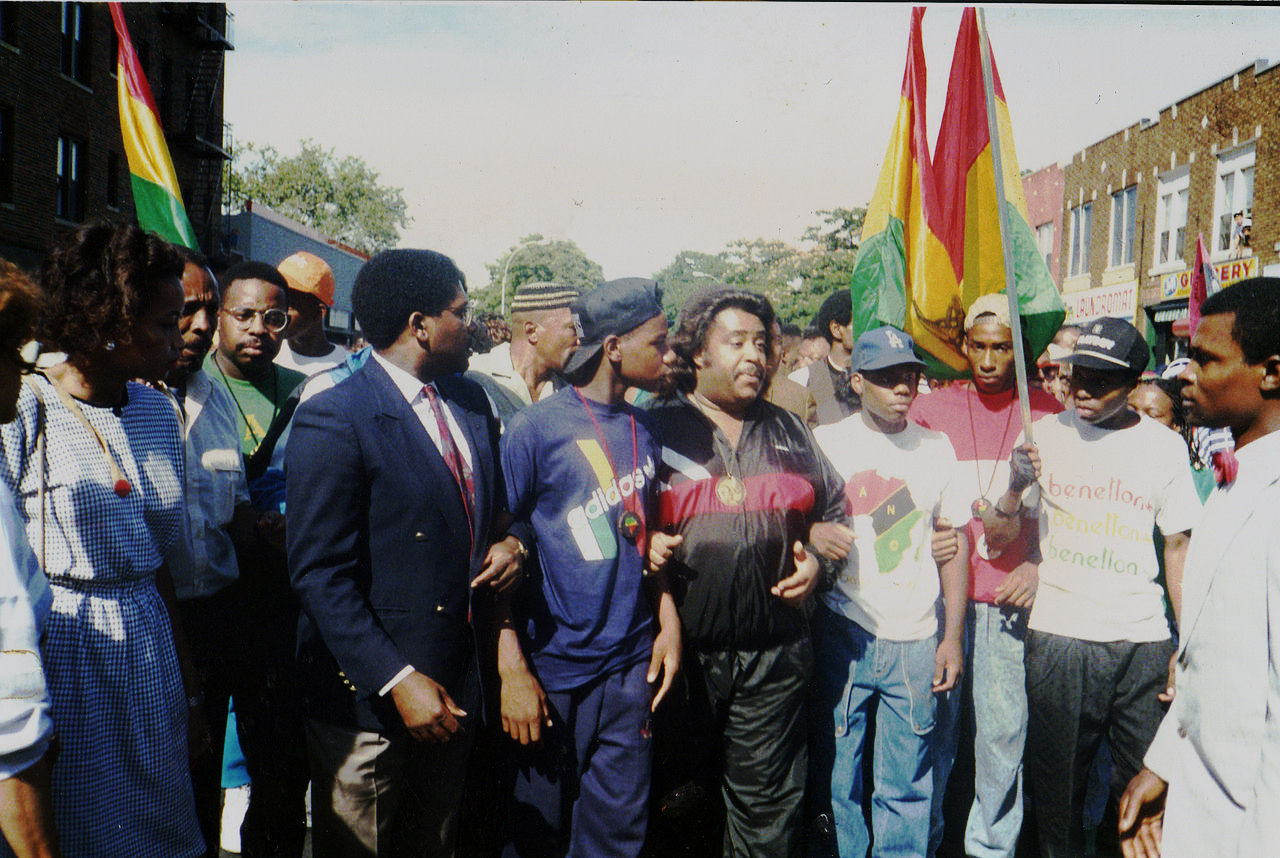
Sharpton leading the first protest march over the murder of Yusef Hawkins in Bensonhurst, Brooklyn, 1989

On August 23, 1989, four African-American teenagers were beaten by a group of 10 to 30 Italian-American youths in Bensonhurst, a Brooklyn neighborhood. One Bensonhurst resident, armed with a handgun, shot and killed 16-year-old Yusef Hawkins.

In the weeks following the assault and murder, Sharpton led several marches through Bensonhurst. The first protest, just days after the incident, was greeted by neighborhood residents shouting "Niggers go home" and holding watermelons to mock the demonstrators.

Sharpton also threatened that Hawkins's three companions would not cooperate with prosecutor Elizabeth Holtzman unless her office agreed to hire more black attorneys. In the end, they cooperated.

In May 1990, when one of the two leaders of the mob was acquitted of the most serious charges brought against him, Sharpton led another protest through Bensonhurst. In January 1991, when other members of the gang were given light sentences, Sharpton planned another march for January 12, 1991. Before that demonstration began, neighborhood resident Michael Riccardi tried to kill Sharpton by stabbing him in the chest. Sharpton recovered from his wounds, and later asked the judge for leniency when Riccardi was sentenced. However, the judge rejected his request, sentencing Riccardi to 5 to 15 years in prison for first degree assault.

=== National Action Network ===
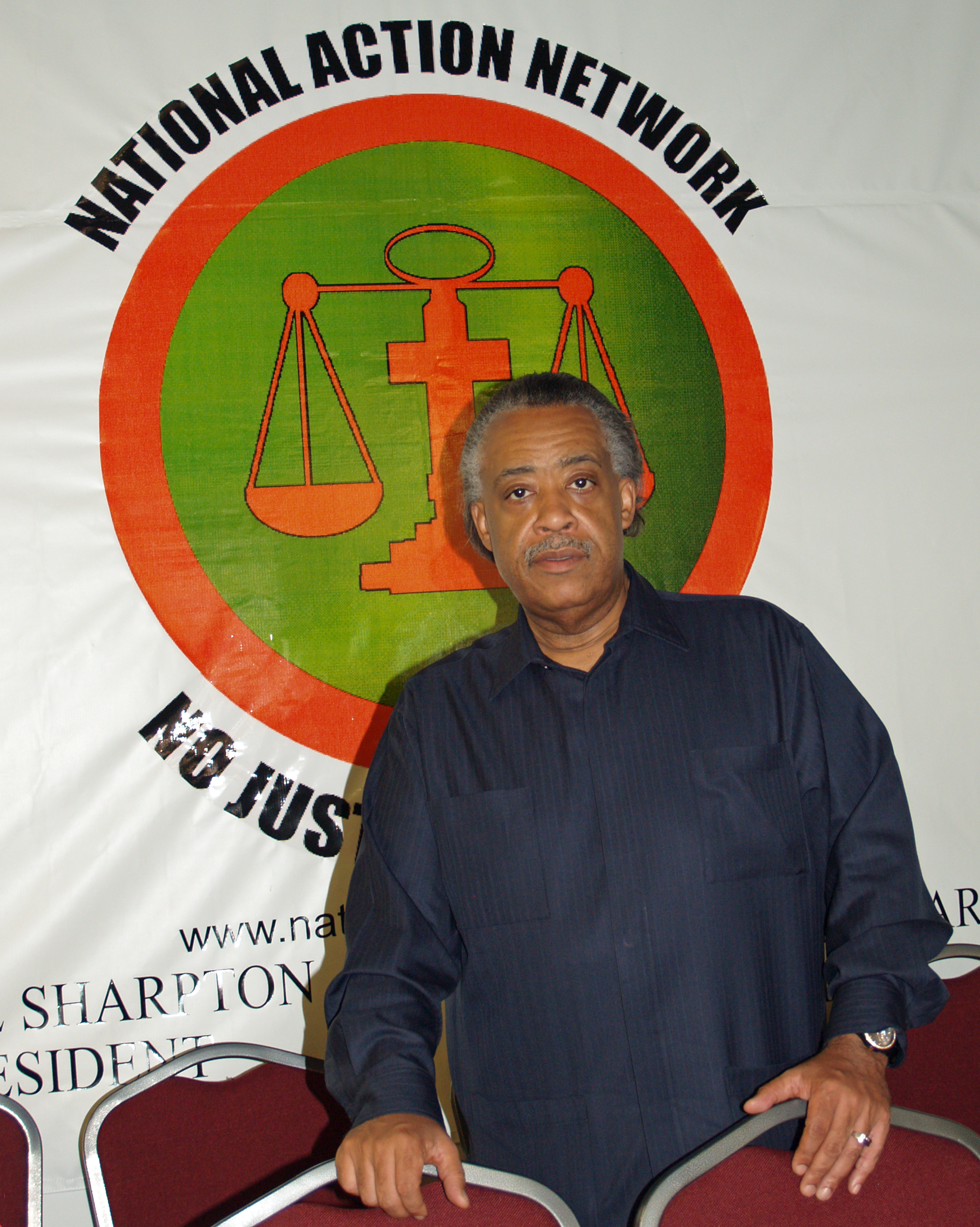
Sharpton at the National Action Network's headquarters, 2007

In 1991, Sharpton founded the National Action Network, an organization designed to increase voter education, to provide services to those in poverty, and to support small community businesses. In 2016, Boise Kimber, an associate of Sharpton and a member of his NAN national board, along with businessman and philanthropist Don Vaccaro, launched Grace Church Websites, a non-profit organization that helps churches create and launch their own websites.

=== Crown Heights riot ===
The Crown Heights riot began on August 19, 1991, after a car driven by a Jewish man, and part of a procession led by an unmarked police car, went through an intersection and was struck by another vehicle causing it to veer onto the sidewalk where it accidentally struck and killed a seven-year-old Guyanese boy named Gavin Cato and severely injured his cousin Angela. Witnesses could not agree upon the speed and could not agree whether the light was yellow or red. One of the factors that sparked the riot was the arrival of a private ambulance, which was later discovered to be on the orders of a police officer who was worried for the Jewish driver's safety, removed him from the scene while Cato lay pinned under his car. After being removed from under the car, Cato and his cousin were treated soon after by a city ambulance. Caribbean-American and African-American residents of the neighborhood rioted for four consecutive days fueled by rumors that the private ambulance had refused to treat Cato. During the riot black youths looted stores, beat Jews in the street, and clashed with groups of Jews, hurling rocks and bottles at one another after Yankel Rosenbaum, a visiting student from Australia, was stabbed and killed by a member of a mob while some chanted "Kill the Jew", and "get the Jews out".

Sharpton marched through Crown Heights and in front of the headquarters of the Chabad-Lubavitch Hasidic movement, shortly after the riot, with about 400 protesters (who chanted "Whose streets? Our streets!" and "No justice, no peace!"), in spite of Mayor David Dinkins' attempts to keep the march from happening. Some commentators felt Sharpton inflamed tensions by making remarks that included "If the Jews want to get it on, tell them to pin their yarmulkes back and come over to my house." In his eulogy for Cato, Sharpton said, "The world will tell us he was killed by accident. Yes, it was a social accident...It's an accident to allow an apartheid ambulance service in the middle of Crown Heights...Talk about how Oppenheimer in South Africa sends diamonds straight to Tel Aviv and deals with the diamond merchants right here in Crown Heights. The issue is not anti-Semitism; the issue is apartheid...All we want to say is what Jesus said: If you offend one of these little ones, you got to pay for it. No compromise, no meetings, no kaffe klatsch, no skinnin' and grinnin'. Pay for your deeds."

In the decades since, Sharpton has conceded that his language and tone "sometimes exacerbated tensions" though he insisted that his marches were peaceful. In a 2019 speech to a Reform Jewish gathering, Sharpton said that he could have "done more to heal rather than harm". He recalled receiving a call from Coretta Scott King at the time, during which she told him "sometimes you are tempted to speak to the applause of the crowd rather than the heights of the cause, and you will say cheap things to get cheap applause rather than do high things to raise the nation higher".

=== Freddy's Fashion Mart ===
In 1995 a black Pentecostal Church, the United House of Prayer, which owned a retail property on 125th Street, asked Fred Harari, a Jewish tenant who operated Freddie's Fashion Mart, to evict his longtime subtenant, a black-owned record store called The Record Shack. Sharpton led a protest in Harlem against the planned eviction of The Record Shack, in which he told the protesters, "We will not stand by and allow them to move this brother so that some white interloper can expand his business."

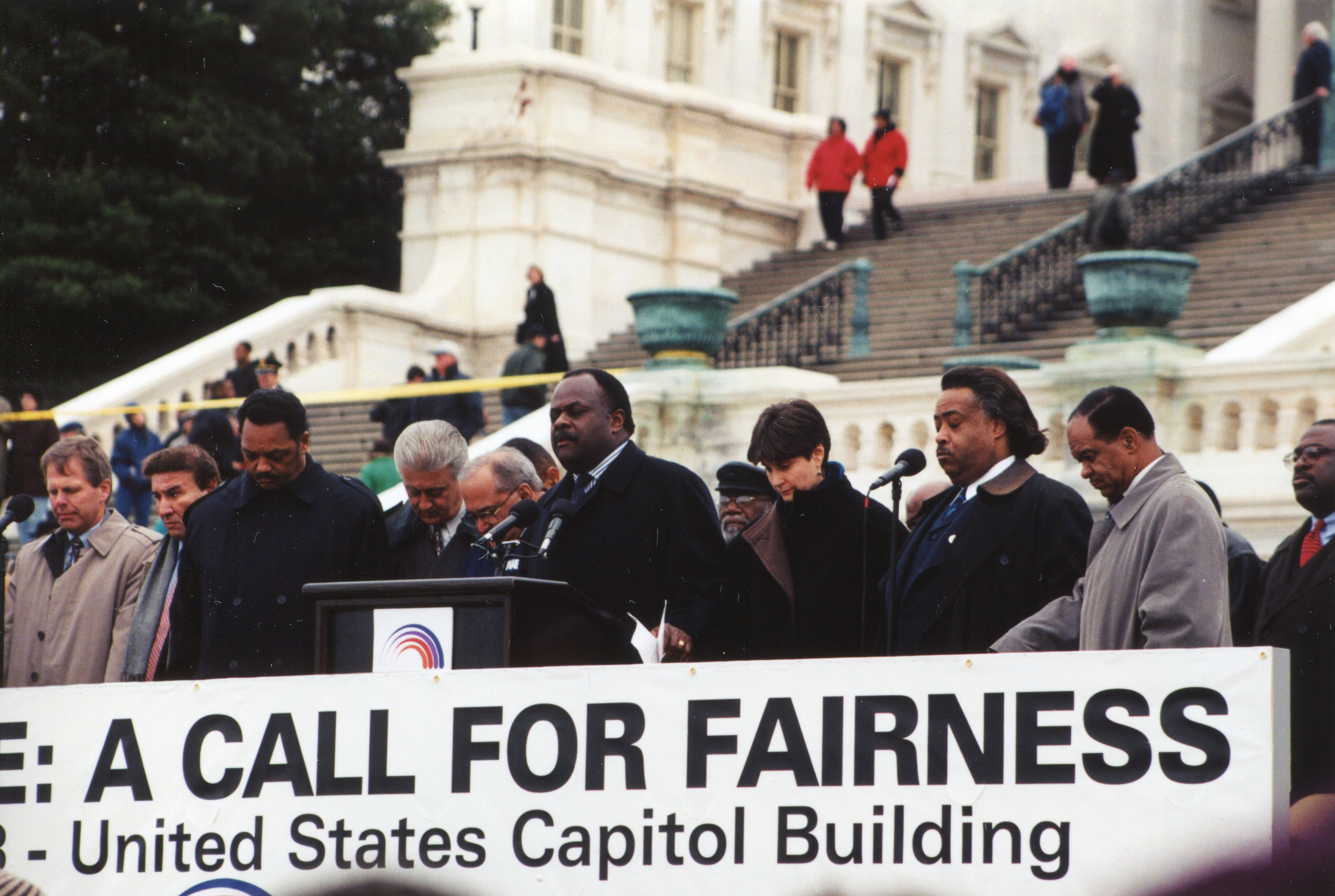
Jesse Jackson (third from left) and Sharpton (third from right) at an anti-impeachment rally at the US Capitol in support of President Bill Clinton (fourth from left), December 17, 1998

On December 8, 1995, Roland J. Smith Jr., one of the protesters, entered Harari's store with a gun and flammable liquid, shot four people and set the store on fire. The gunman fatally shot himself, and seven store employees died of smoke inhalation. Fire Department officials discovered that the store's sprinkler had been shut down, in violation of the local fire code. Sharpton claimed that the perpetrator was an open critic of himself and his nonviolent tactics. In 2002, Sharpton expressed regret for making the racial remark "white interloper" but denied responsibility for inflaming or provoking the violence.

=== Amadou Diallo ===
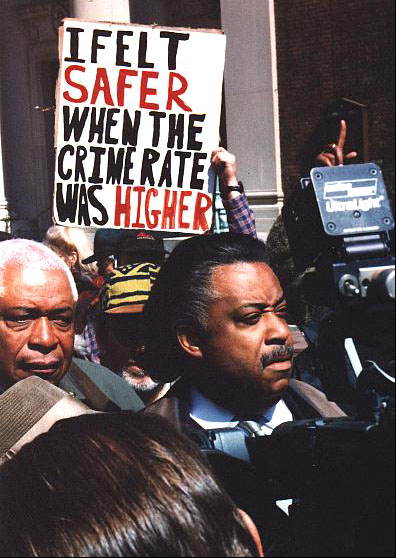
Rev. Al Sharpton outside of New York City Police Department Headquarters, 1999

In 1999, Sharpton led a protest to raise awareness about the death of Amadou Diallo, an immigrant from Guinea who was shot dead by NYPD officers. Sharpton claimed that Diallo's death was the result of police brutality and racial profiling. Although all four defendants were found not guilty of any crimes in the criminal trial, Diallo's family was later awarded $3 million in a wrongful death suit filed against the city.

=== Tyisha Miller ===
In May 1999, Sharpton, Jesse Jackson, and other activists protested the December 1998 fatal police shooting of Tyisha Miller in central Riverside, California. Miller, a 19-year-old African-American woman, had sat unconscious in a locked car with a flat tire and the engine left running, parked at a local gas station. After her relatives had called 9-1-1, Riverside Police Department officers who responded to the scene observed a gun in the young woman's lap, and according to their accounts, she was shaking and foaming at the mouth, and in need of medical attention. When officers decided to break her window to reach her, as one officer reached for the weapon, she allegedly awoke and clutched her firearm, prompting several officers to open fire, hitting her 23 times and killing her. When the Riverside County district attorney stated that the officers involved had erred in judgement but committed no crime, declining to file criminal charges against them, Sharpton participated in protests which reached their zenith when protestors spilled onto the busy SR 91, completely stopping traffic. Sharpton was arrested for his participation and leadership in these protests. Sharpton referred to the special prosecutor, attorney general Bob Abrams, as "Mr. Hitler".

=== Vieques ===
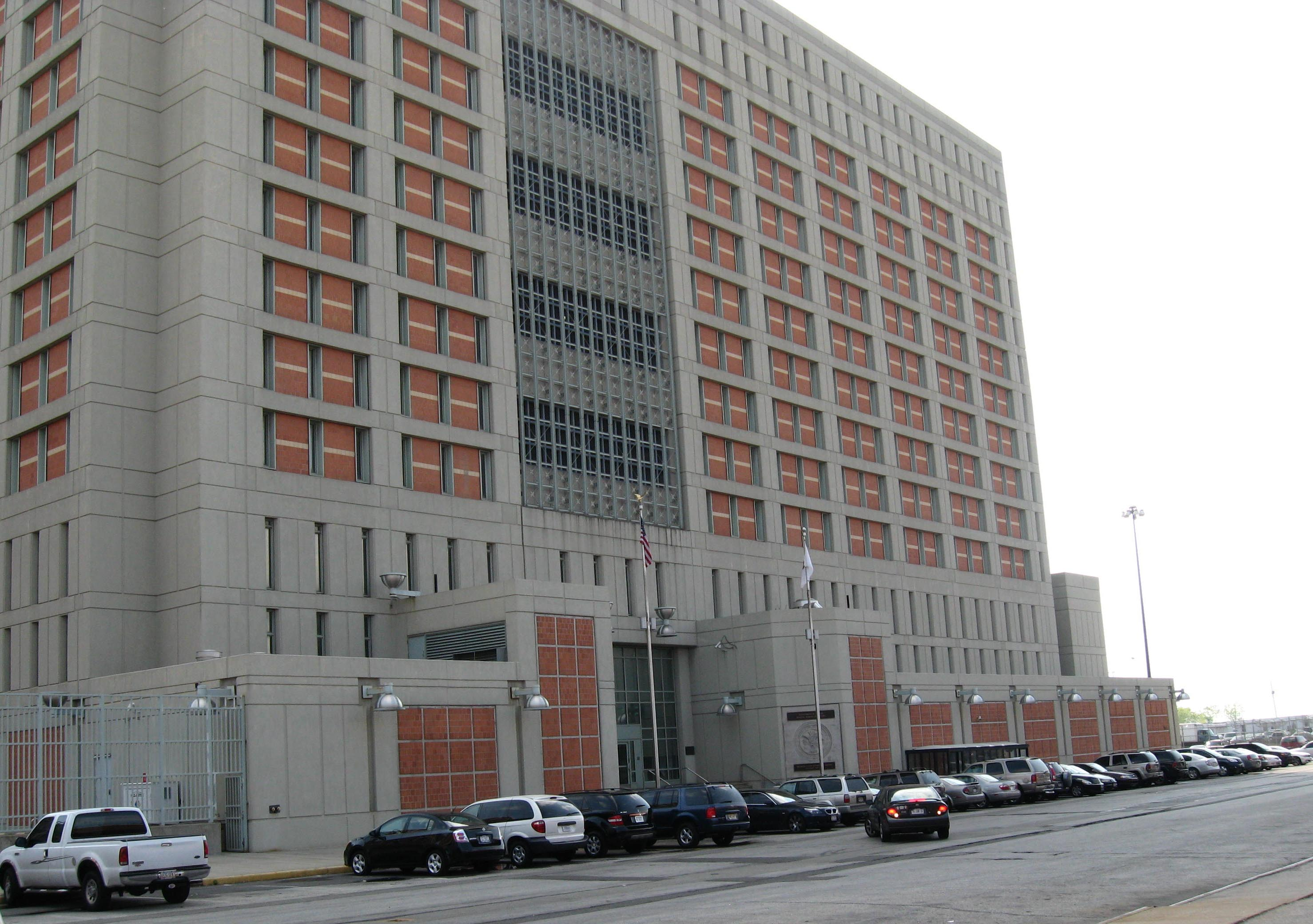
Metropolitan Detention Center, Brooklyn, where Sharpton was imprisoned

In 2001, Sharpton was jailed for 90 days on trespassing charges while protesting against U.S. military target practice exercises in Puerto Rico near a United States Navy bombing site. Sharpton was held in a Puerto Rican lockup for two days and then imprisoned at Metropolitan Detention Center, Brooklyn on May 25, 2001. He went on a 43-day hunger strike to protest the bombing, losing 31 pounds, and was released on August 17, 2001.

=== Ousmane Zongo ===
In 2002, Sharpton was involved in protests following the death of West African immigrant Ousmane Zongo. Zongo, who was unarmed, was shot by an undercover police officer during a raid on a warehouse in the Chelsea neighborhood of Manhattan. Sharpton met with the family and also provided some legal services.

=== Sean Bell ===
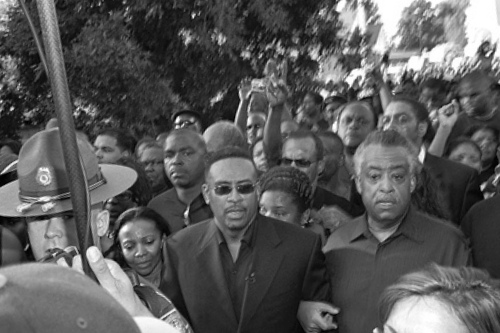
Talk show host Michael Baisden and Al Sharpton, at the front of the September 20, 2007, march in Jena, Louisiana

On November 25, 2006, Sean Bell was shot and killed in the Jamaica section of Queens, New York, by plainclothes detectives from the New York Police Department in a fusillade of 50 bullets. The incident sparked fierce criticism of the police from the public and drew comparisons to the 1999 killing of Amadou Diallo. Three of the five detectives involved in the shooting went to trial in 2008 on charges ranging from manslaughter to reckless endangerment but were found not guilty.

On May 7, 2008, in response to the acquittals of the officers, Sharpton coordinated peaceful protests at major river crossings in New York City, including the Brooklyn Bridge, the Queensboro Bridge, the Triborough Bridge, the Manhattan Bridge, the Holland Tunnel, and the Queens–Midtown Tunnel. Sharpton and about 200 others were arrested for blocking traffic and resisting police orders to disperse.

=== Dunbar Village ===
On March 11, 2008, Sharpton held a press conference to highlight what he said was unequal treatment of four suspected rapists in a high-profile crime in the Dunbar Village Housing Projects in West Palm Beach, Florida. The suspects, who were young black men, were arrested for allegedly raping and beating a black Haitian woman at gunpoint. The crime also involved forcing the woman to perform oral sex on her 12-year-old son.

At his press conference Sharpton said that any violent act toward a woman is inexcusable but he felt that the accused youths were being treated unfairly because they were black. Sharpton contrasted the treatment of the suspects, who were held without bail, with white suspects involved in a gang rape—which he claimed was equivalent to the Dunbar Village attack—who were released after posting bond.

=== Reclaim the Dream commemorative march ===
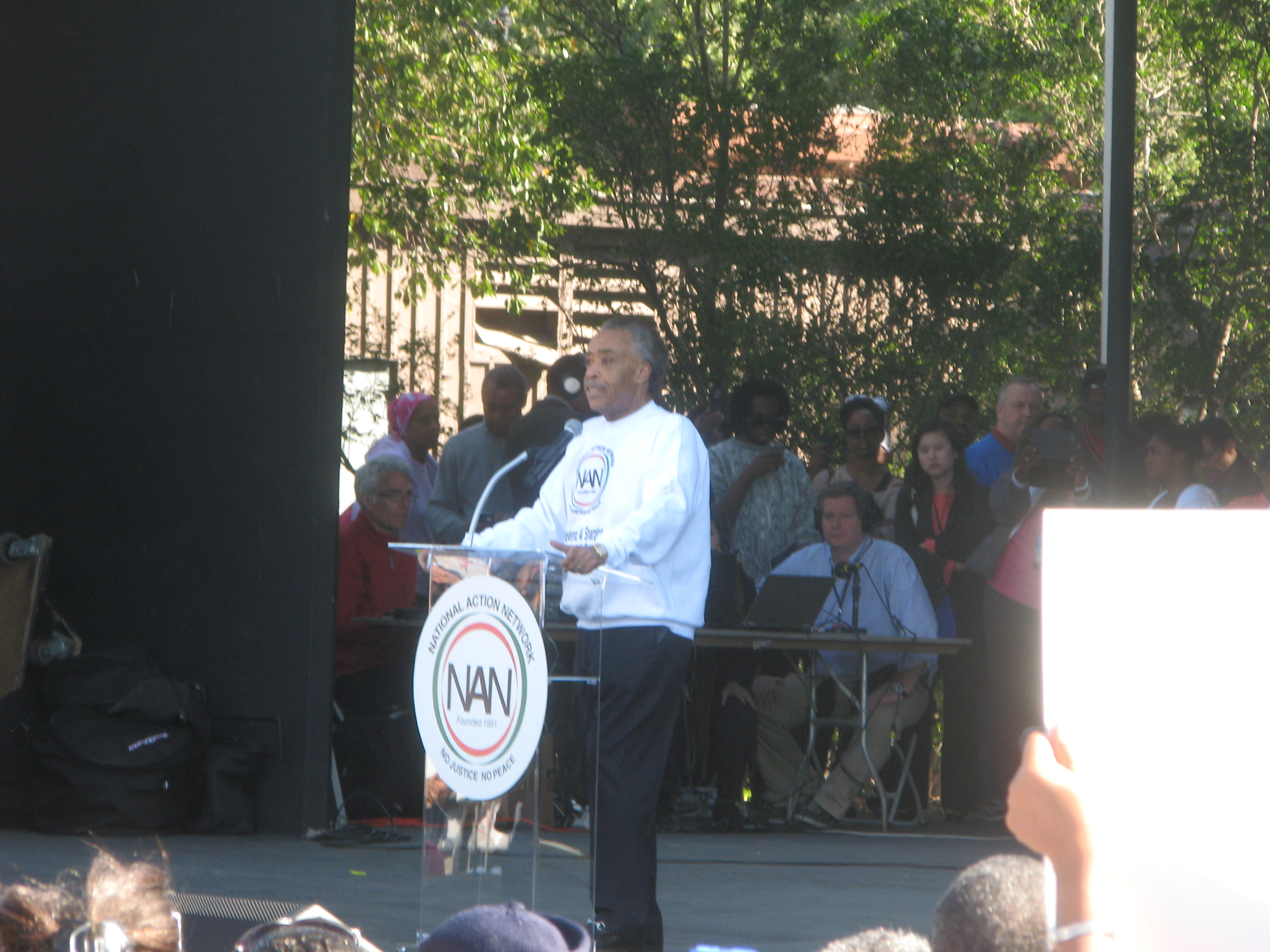
Sharpton speaking at the National Action Network's march in support of the American Jobs Act, October 15, 2011

On August 28, 2010, Sharpton and other civil rights leaders led a march to commemorate the 47th anniversary of the historic March on Washington. After gathering at Dunbar High School in Washington, D.C., thousands of people marched five miles to the National Mall.

=== Tanya McDowell ===
In June 2011, Sharpton spoke at a rally in support of Tanya McDowell, who was arrested and charged with larceny for allegedly registering her son for kindergarten in the wrong public school district using a false address. She claimed to spend time in both a Bridgeport, Connecticut, apartment and a homeless shelter in Norwalk, where her son was registered.

=== George Zimmerman ===
Following the 2012 killing of Trayvon Martin by George Zimmerman, Sharpton led several protests and rallies criticizing the Sanford Police Department over the handling of the shooting and called for Zimmerman's arrest: "Zimmerman should have been arrested that night. You cannot defend yourself against a pack of Skittles and iced tea." Sean Hannity accused Sharpton and MSNBC of "rush[ing] to judgment" in the case. MSNBC issued a statement in which they said Sharpton "repeatedly called for calm" and further investigation. Following the acquittal of Zimmerman, Sharpton called the not guilty verdict an "atrocity" and "a slap in the face to those that believe in justice". Subsequently, Sharpton and his organization, National Action Network, held rallies in several cities denouncing the verdict and called for "Justice for Trayvon".

=== Eric Garner ===
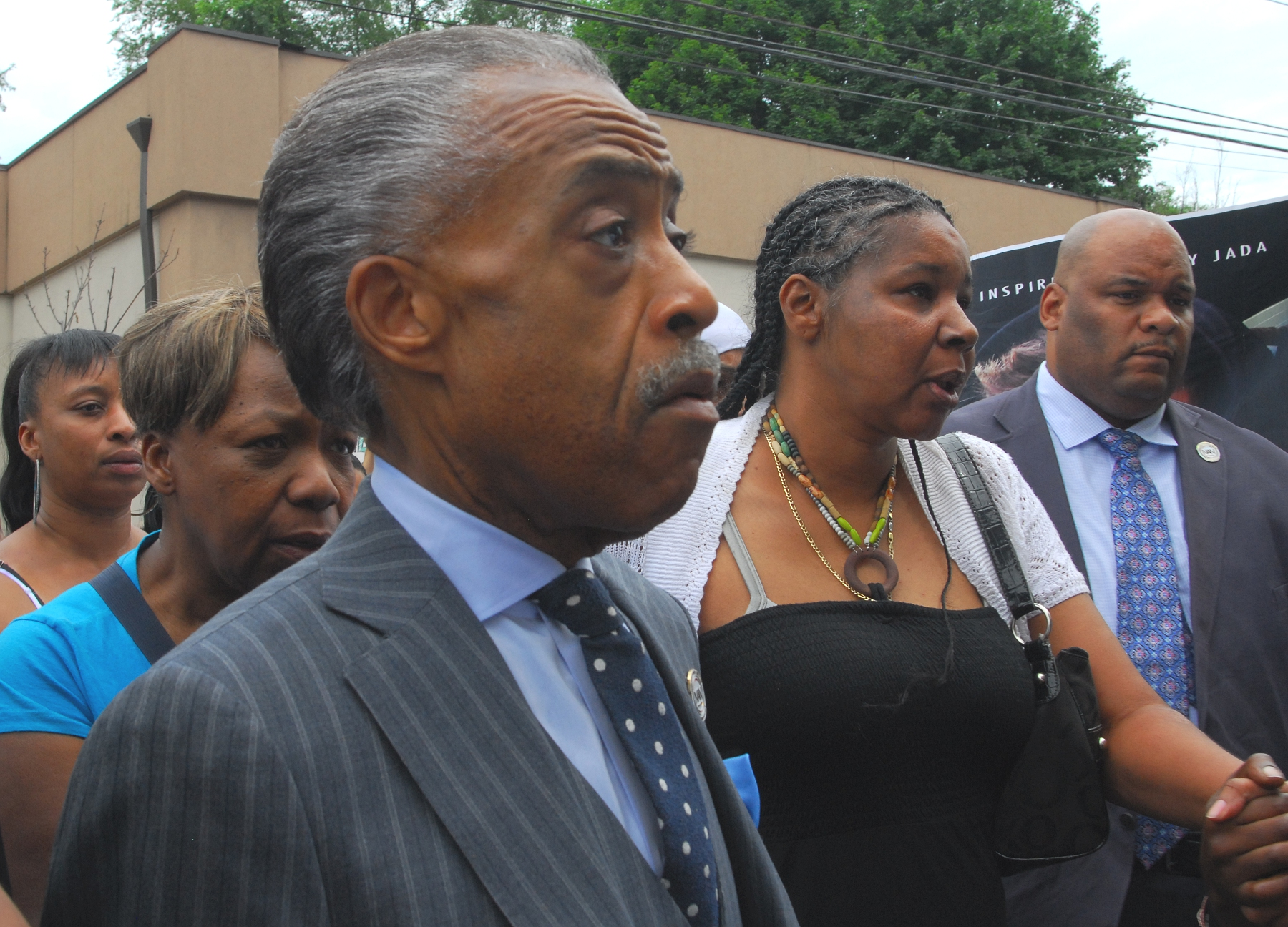
Rev. Sharpton and Eric Garner's widow, Esaw Garner (right) in Staten Island, protesting the killing of Eric Garner, July 19, 2014

After the July 2014 death of Eric Garner on Staten Island, New York, by a New York City Police Department officer, Daniel Pantaleo, Sharpton organized a peaceful protest in Staten Island on the afternoon of July 19, and condemned the police's use of the chokehold on Garner, saying that "there is no justification" for it. Sharpton had also planned to lead a protest on August 23, in which participants would have driven over the Verrazzano–Narrows Bridge, then traveled to the site of the altercation and the office of District Attorney Dan Donovan This idea was scrapped in favor of Sharpton leading a peaceful march along Bay Street in Staten Island, where Garner died; over 5,000 people marched in the demonstration.

=== Barack Obama ===
In 2014, Glenn Thrush of Politico described Sharpton as an "adviser" to President Barack Obama and as Obama's "go-to man" on racial issues.

=== Ministers March for Justice ===
On August 28, 2017, the fifty-fourth anniversary of the March on Washington at which Martin Luther King Jr. gave his "I Have a Dream" speech, Sharpton organized the Ministers March for Justice, promising to bring a thousand members of the clergy to Washington, D.C., to deliver a "unified moral rebuke" to President Donald Trump. Several thousand religious leaders were present, including Christians, Jews, Muslims, and Sikhs. Washington Post columnist Dana Milbank wrote that "President Trump has united us, after all. He brought together the Rev. Al Sharpton and the Jews."

=== George Floyd ===
At the funeral of George Floyd on June 4, 2020, Sharpton delivered a eulogy where he called for the four Minneapolis policemen involved in Floyd's murder to be brought to justice. He also criticized President Donald Trump for his talk about "bringing in the military" when "some kids wrongly start violence that this family doesn't condone" and that Trump has "not said one word about 8 minutes and 46 seconds of police murder of George Floyd". On April 20, 2021, with the conviction of Derek Chauvin for murdering George Floyd, Sharpton led prayer with the Floyd family in Minneapolis.

=== Kwanzaa and Hanukkah ===
In December 2022, taking a stand together against the increasing instances of racism and antisemitism in the United States, Sharpton, New York City Mayor Eric Adams, Vista Equity Partners CEO and Carnegie Hall Chairman Robert F. Smith, Reverend Conrad Tillard, World Values Network founder and CEO Rabbi Shmuley Boteach, and Elisha Wiesel joined to host 15 Days of Light, celebrating Hanukkah and Kwanzaa in a unifying holiday ceremony at Carnegie Hall. Sharpton said: "There is never a time more needed than now for Blacks and Jews to remember the struggle that we've gone through. You can't fight for anybody if you don't fight for everybody. I cannot fight for Black rights if I don't fight for Jewish rights ... because then it becomes a matter of self-aggrandizement rather than fighting for humanity. It's easy for Blacks to stand up for racism. It's easy for Jews to stand up to antisemitism. But if you want to really be a leader, you got to speak as a Black against antisemitism and antisemites, and you got to speak as a Jew against racism."

=== Tyre Nichols ===
At the funeral of Tyre Nichols on February 2, 2023, Sharpton delivered the eulogy for the service. He, alongside vice president Kamala Harris, called on lawmakers to approve the George Floyd Justice in Policing Act and other police reforms.

== Political views ==
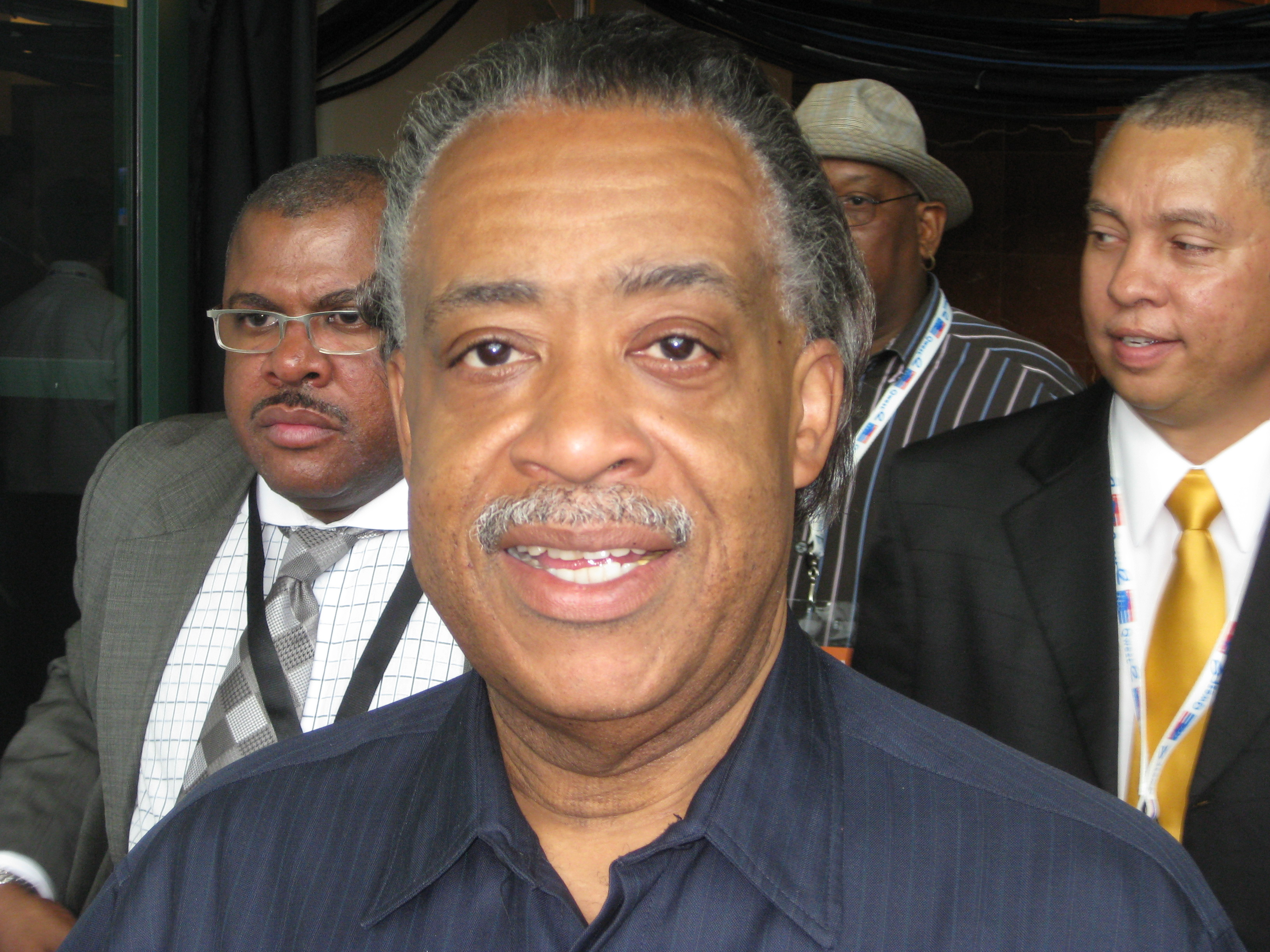
Sharpton attending the 2008 Democratic National Convention

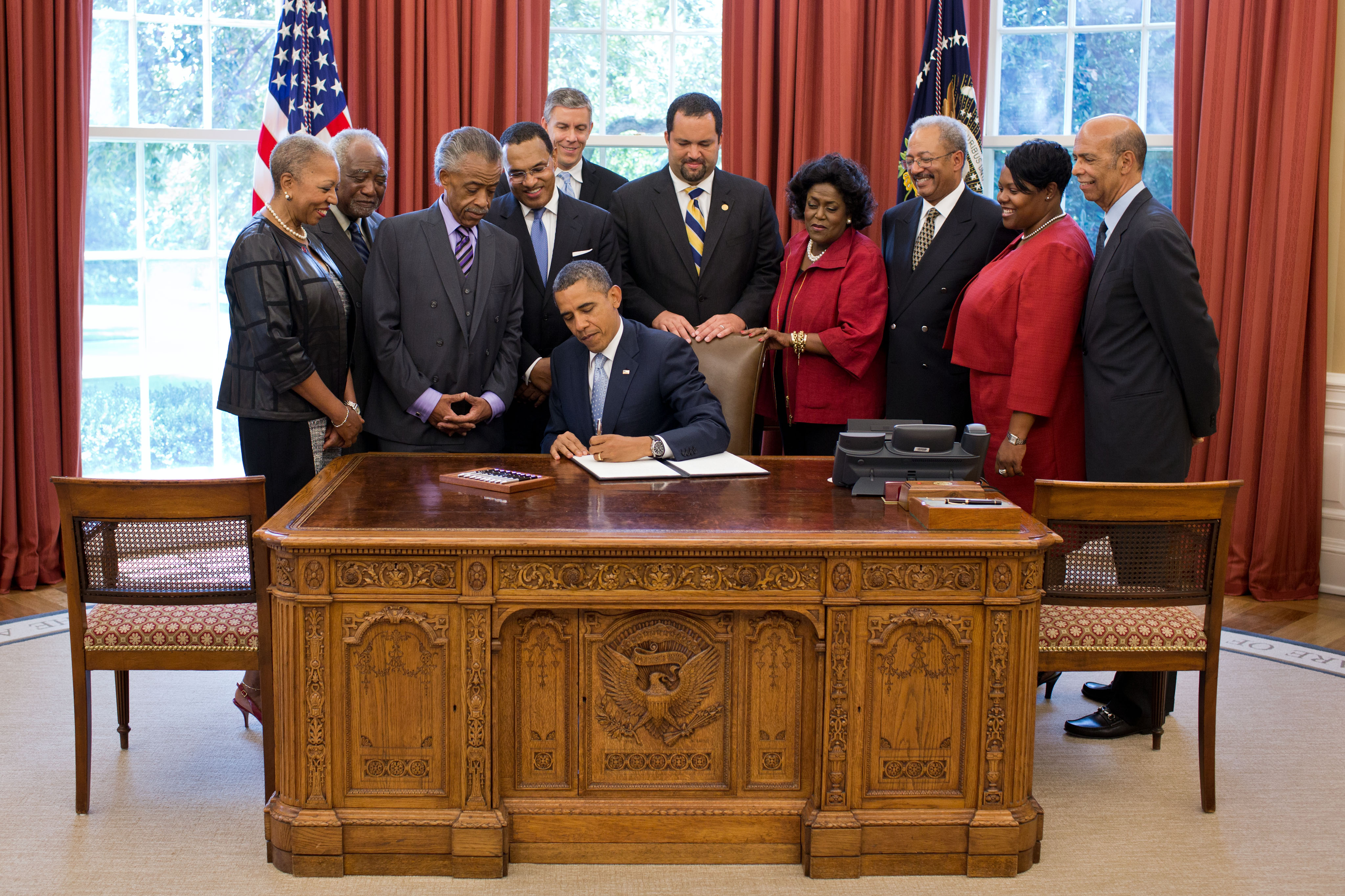
Sharpton watches as President Barack Obama signs an executive order on July 26, 2012.

In September 2007, Sharpton was asked whether he considered it important for the US to have a black president. He responded, "It would be a great moment as long as the black candidate was supporting the interest that would inevitably help our people. A lot of my friends went with Clarence Thomas and regret it to this day. I don't assume that just because somebody's my color, they're my kind. But I'm warming up to Obama, but I'm not there yet."

Sharpton has spoken out against cruelty to animals in a video recorded for People for the Ethical Treatment of Animals.

Sharpton is a supporter of equal rights for gays and lesbians and same-sex marriage. During his 2004 presidential campaign, Sharpton said he thought it was insulting to be asked to discuss the issue of gay marriage. "It's like asking do I support black marriage or white marriage.... The inference of the question is that gays are not like other human beings." Sharpton is leading a grassroots movement to eliminate homophobia within the Black church.

In 2014, Sharpton began a push for criminal justice reform, citing the fact that black people represent a greater proportion of those arrested and incarcerated in America.

In August 2017, Sharpton called for the federal government to stop maintaining the Jefferson Memorial in Washington, D.C., because Thomas Jefferson owned 600 slaves and had a sexually abusive relationship with his slave Sally Hemings. He said taxpayer funds should not be used to care for monuments to slave-owners and that private museums were preferable. He went on to elaborate: "People need to understand that people were enslaved. Our families were victims of this. Public monuments [to people like Jefferson] are supported by public funds. You're asking me to subsidize the insult to my family."

Sharpton is an opponent of the Defund the Police movement, charging that the idea is being pushed by "latte liberals" who were out of touch with the African-American community, and that black and poor neighbourhoods "need proper policing" to protect the inhabitants from higher crime rates.

== Reputation ==
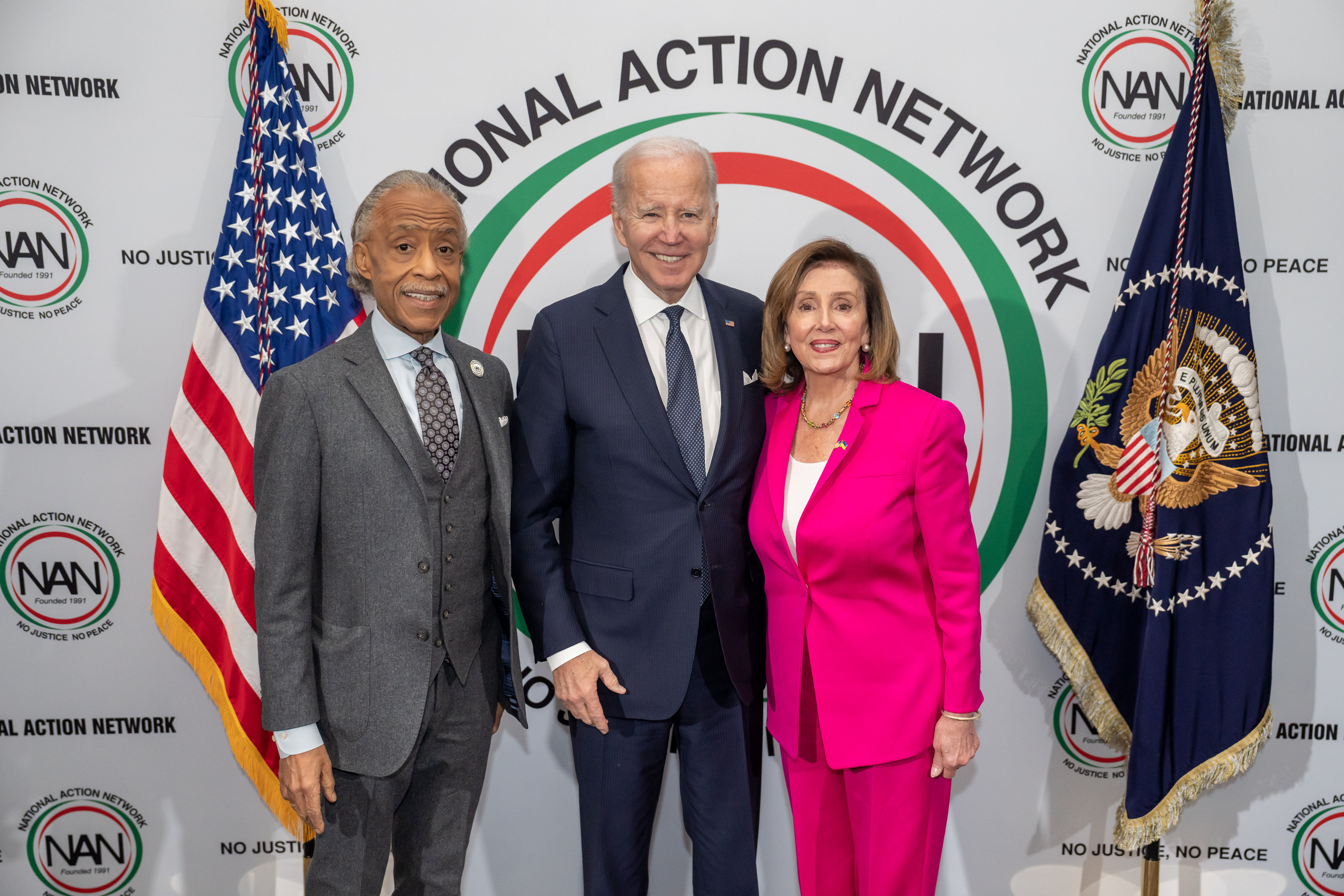
Sharpton with President Joe Biden and Representative Nancy Pelosi in 2023

Sharpton's supporters praise "his ability and willingness to defy the power structure that is seen as the cause of their suffering" and consider him "a man who is willing to tell it like it is". Former Mayor of New York City Ed Koch, one-time foe, said that Sharpton deserves the respect he enjoys among black Americans: "He is willing to go to jail for them, and he is there when they need him." President Barack Obama said that Sharpton is "the voice of the voiceless and a champion for the downtrodden". A 2013 Zogby Analytics poll found that one quarter of African Americans said that Sharpton speaks for them.

His critics describe him as "a political radical who is to blame, in part, for the deterioration of race relations". Sociologist Orlando Patterson has referred to him as a racial arsonist, while liberal columnist Derrick Z. Jackson has called him the black equivalent of Richard Nixon and Pat Buchanan. Sharpton sees much of the criticism as a sign of his effectiveness. "In many ways, what they consider criticism is complimenting my job," he said. "An activist's job is to make public civil rights issues until there can be a climate for change."

== Controversies ==
=== Tobacco industry funding ===
In 2021, Sharpton was criticized for leading a tobacco industry pushback against a proposed ban on the sale of menthol cigarettes using "cynically manipulative" arguments while his National Action Network accepted funding from tobacco companies.

=== Comments on Mormons ===
During 2007, Sharpton was accused of bigotry for comments he made in a debate with Christopher Hitchens on May 7, 2007, concerning presidential candidate Mitt Romney and his religion, Mormonism:

As for the one Mormon running for office, those who really believe in God will defeat him anyways, so don't worry about that; that's a temporary situation.

In response, a representative for Romney told reporters that "bigotry toward anyone because of their beliefs is unacceptable." The Catholic League compared Sharpton to Don Imus, and said that his remarks "should finish his career".

On May 9, during an interview on Paula Zahn NOW, Sharpton said that his views on Mormonism were based on the "Mormon Church's traditionally racist views regarding blacks" and its interpretation of the so-called "Curse of Ham". On May 10, Sharpton called two apostles of The Church of Jesus Christ of Latter-day Saints and apologized to them for his remarks and asked to meet with them. A spokesman for the Church confirmed that Sharpton had called and said that "we appreciate it very much, Rev. Sharpton's call, and we consider the matter closed." He also apologized to "any member of the Mormon church" who was offended by his comments. Later that month, Sharpton went to Salt Lake City, Utah, where he met with Elder M. Russell Ballard, a leader of the Church, and Elder Robert C. Oaks of the Church's Presidency of the Seventy.

=== Racial and homophobic comments ===
On February 13, 1994, Sharpton told a student audience at Kean University in New Jersey: "White folks was in the caves while we was building empires," he said. "We built pyramids before Donald Trump even knew what architecture was. We taught philosophy and astrology and mathematics before Socrates and them Greek homos ever got around to it." Sharpton defended his comments by saying that the term "homo" was not homophobic; however, he added that he no longer uses the term. At the same lecture, he said, "Do some cracker come and tell you, 'Well my mother and father blood go back to the Mayflower,' you better hold your pocket. That ain't nothing to be proud of, that means their forefathers was crooks."

On one occasion in 1992, he derided moderate black politicians close to the Democratic Party as "cocktail sip Negroes" or "yellow niggers".

=== Tawana Brawley rape case ===
Al Sharpton interviewed in 2007 on whether he is tired of hearing about Tawana Brawley 20 years later

On November 28, 1987, Tawana Brawley, a 15-year-old black girl, was found smeared with feces, lying in a garbage bag, her clothing torn and burned and with various slurs and epithets written on her body in charcoal. Brawley claimed she had been assaulted and raped by six white men, some of them police officers, in the town of Wappinger, New York.

Attorneys Alton H. Maddox and C. Vernon Mason joined Sharpton in support of Brawley. A grand jury was convened; after seven months of examining police and medical records, the jury found "overwhelming evidence" that Brawley had fabricated her story. Sharpton, Maddox, and Mason had accused the Dutchess County prosecutor, Steven Pagones, of racism and of being one of the perpetrators of the alleged abduction and rape. The three were successfully sued for defamation, and were ordered to pay $345,000 in damages, with the jury finding Sharpton liable for making seven defamatory statements about Pagones, Maddox for two, and Mason for one. Sharpton refused to pay his share of the damages; it was later paid by a number of black business leaders including Johnnie Cochran.

Sharpton said in 2007 that if he had it to do over again, he might have not attacked Pagones personally, but would otherwise have handled the Brawley case the same way. He added: "I disagreed with the grand jury on Brawley. I believed there was enough evidence to go to trial. Grand jury said there wasn't. Okay, fine. Do I have a right to disagree with the grand jury? Many Americans believe O. J. Simpson was guilty. A jury said he wasn't. So I have as much right to question a jury as they do. Does it make somebody a racist? No! They just disagreed with the jury. So did I."

Michael Hardy, who served as defense lawyer for Sharpton in Pagones' defamation case against him, would becoming a key founding member of National Action Network, serving as Executive Vice President and later also becoming General Counsel in 2008. Hardy served with Sharpton's organization until his death in July 2024.

=== Work as FBI informant ===
Sharpton said in 1988 that he informed for the government in order to stem the flow of crack cocaine into black neighborhoods. He denied informing on civil rights leaders.

In 2002, HBO's Real Sports with Bryant Gumbel aired a 19-year-old FBI videotape of an undercover sting operation showing Sharpton with an undercover FBI agent posing as a Latin American drug lord. During the discussion, the undercover agent offered Sharpton a 10% commission for arranging drug sales. On the videotape, Sharpton mostly nods and allows the FBI agent to do most of the talking. No drug deal was ever consummated, and no charges were brought against Sharpton as a result of the tape.

In April 2014, The Smoking Gun obtained documents indicating that Sharpton became an FBI informant in 1983 following Sharpton's role in a drug sting involving Colombo crime family captain Michael Franzese. Sharpton allegedly recorded incriminating conversations with Genovese and Gambino family mobsters, contributing to the indictments of several underworld figures. Sharpton is referred to in FBI documents as "CI-7".

Summarizing the evidence supporting that Sharpton was an active FBI informant in the 1980s, William Bastone, the Smoking Gun's founder, stated: "If he (Sharpton) didn't think he was an informant, the 'Genovese squad' of the FBI and NYPD officials sure knew him to be an informant. He was paid to be an informant, he carried a briefcase with a recording device in it, and he made surreptitious tape recordings of a Gambino crime family member 10 separate times as an informant. He did it at the direction of the FBI, he was prepped by the FBI, was handed the briefcase by the FBI and was debriefed after the meetings. That's an informant." Sharpton disputes portions of the allegations.

Sharpton is alleged to have secretly recorded conversations with black activists in the 1980s regarding Joanne Chesimard (Assata Shakur) and other underground black militants. Veteran activist Ahmed Obafemi told the New York Daily News that he had long suspected Sharpton of taping him with the bugged briefcase.

=== Tax issues ===
In 1993, Sharpton pleaded guilty to a misdemeanor for failing to file a state income tax return. Later, the authorities discovered that one of Sharpton's for-profit companies, Raw Talent, which he used as a repository for money from speaking engagements, was also not paying taxes, a failure that continued for years.

On May 9, 2008, the Associated Press reported that Sharpton and his businesses owed almost $1.5 million in unpaid taxes and penalties. Sharpton owed $931,000 in federal income tax and $366,000 to New York, and his for-profit company, Rev. Al Communications, owed another $176,000 to the state.

The Internal Revenue Service sent subpoenas to several corporations that had donated to Sharpton's National Action Network. Sharpton countered the investigative actions with a charge that they reflected a political agenda by United States agencies.

On September 29, 2010, Robert Snell of The Detroit News reported that the Internal Revenue Service had filed a notice of federal tax lien against Sharpton in New York City in the amount of over $538,000. Sharpton's lawyer asserts that the notice of federal tax lien relates to Sharpton's year 2009 federal income tax return, the due date of which has been extended to October 15, 2010, according to the lawyer. However, the Snell report states that the lien relates to taxes assessed during 2009.

According to The New York Times, Sharpton and his for-profit businesses owed $4.5 million in state and federal taxes as of November 2014.

== Personal life ==
In 1971 while touring with James Brown, Sharpton met future wife Kathy Jordan, who was a backing singer. Sharpton and Jordan married in 1980. The couple separated in 2004. They have two daughters, Ashley and Dominique. In July 2013, the New York Daily News reported that Sharpton, while still married to his second wife (Kathy Jordan), now had a self-described "girlfriend", Aisha McShaw, aged 35, and that the couple had "been an item for months.... photographed at elegant bashes all over the country". McShaw, the Daily News reported, referred to herself professionally as both a "personal stylist" and "personal banker". More than 16 years after their separation, Sharpton filed for divorce from Kathy Jordan in 2021.

Sharpton is an honorary member of Phi Beta Sigma fraternity.

=== Religion ===
Sharpton was licensed and ordained a Pentecostal minister by Bishop F. D. Washington at the age of nine or ten. After Bishop Washington's death in the late 1980s, Sharpton became a Baptist. He was re-baptized as a member of the Bethany Baptist Church in 1994 by the Reverend William Augustus Jones and became a Baptist minister.

During 2007, Sharpton participated in a public debate with atheist writer Christopher Hitchens, defending his religious faith and his belief in the existence of God.

=== Assassination attempt ===
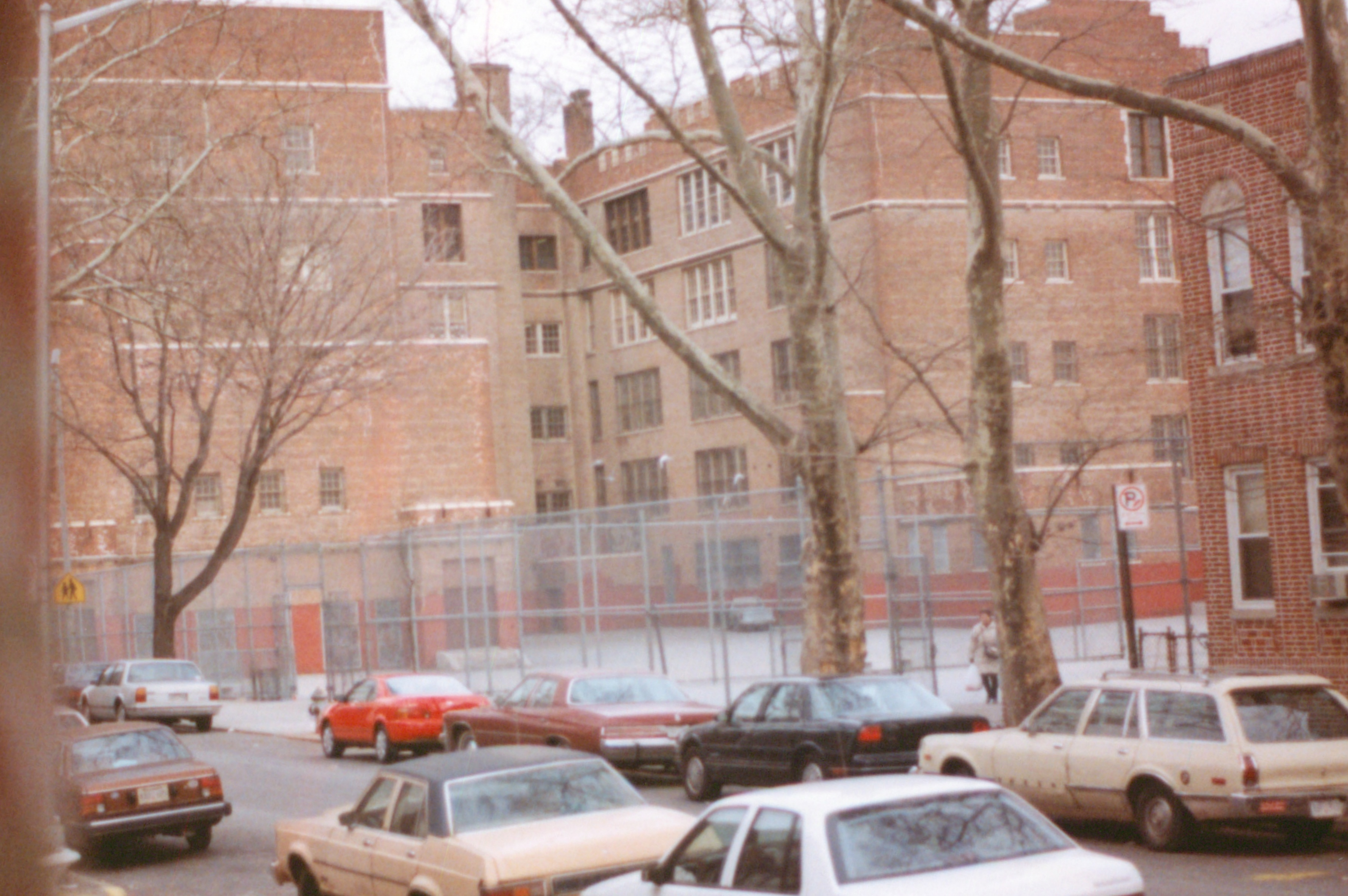
The schoolyard of P.S. 205 in Brooklyn, c. 1991

On January 12, 1991, Sharpton escaped serious injury when he was stabbed in the chest in the schoolyard at P.S. 205 by Michael Riccardi while Sharpton was preparing to lead a protest through Bensonhurst in Brooklyn, New York. The intoxicated attacker was apprehended by Sharpton's aides and handed over to police, who were present for the planned protest.

In 1992, Riccardi was convicted of first-degree assault. Sharpton asked the judge for leniency when sentencing Riccardi. The judge sentenced Riccardi to five to 15 years in jail, and he served ten years in prison being released on parole on January 8, 2001.

Sharpton, although forgiving his attacker and pleading for leniency on his behalf, filed suit against New York City alleging that the many police present had failed to protect him from his attacker. In December 2003, he finally reached a $200,000 settlement with the city just as jury selection was about to start.

=== Indirect connection to Strom Thurmond ===
In February 2007, genealogist Megan Smolenyak discovered that Sharpton's great-grandfather, Coleman Sharpton, was a slave owned by Julia Thurmond, whose grandfather was Strom Thurmond's great-great-grandfather. Coleman Sharpton was later freed.

The Sharpton family name originated with Coleman Sharpton's previous owner, who was named Alexander Sharpton.

== Political campaigns ==
Sharpton has run unsuccessfully for elected office on multiple occasions. Of his unsuccessful runs, he said that winning office may not have been his goal, saying in an interview: "Much of the media criticism of me assumes their goals and they impose them on me. Well, those might not be my goals. So they will say, 'Well, Sharpton has not won a political office.' But that might not be my goal! Maybe I ran for political office to change the debate, or to raise the social justice question." Sharpton ran for a United States Senate seat from New York in 1988, 1992, and 1994. In 1997, he ran for Mayor of New York City. During his 1992 bid, he and his wife lived in a home in Englewood, New Jersey, though he said his residence was an apartment in Brooklyn.

On December 15, 2005, Sharpton agreed to repay $100,000 in public funds he received from the federal government for his 2004 presidential campaign. The repayment was required because Sharpton had exceeded federal limits on personal expenditures for his campaign. At that time, his most recent Federal Election Commission filings (from January 1, 2005) stated that Sharpton's campaign still had debts of $479,050 and owed Sharpton himself $145,146 for an item listed as "Fundraising Letter Preparation — Kinko's".

In 2009, the Federal Election Commission announced it had levied a fine of $285,000 against Sharpton's 2004 presidential campaign team for breaking campaign finance rules during his bid for president.

Sharpton said in 2007 that he would not enter the 2008 presidential race.

=== Electoral history ===
==== U.S. Senate (1992, 1994) ====
1992 U.S. Senate election in New York, Democratic primary
Party	Candidate	Votes	%
	Robert Abrams	426,904	37.02%
	Geraldine Ferraro	415,650	36.04%
	Al Sharpton	166,665	14.45%
	Elizabeth Holtzman	144,026	12.49%
Total votes		1,153,245	100.00%

1994 U.S. Senate election in New York, Democratic primary
Party	Candidate	Votes	%
	Daniel Patrick Moynihan (inc.)	526,766	74.72%
	Al Sharpton	178,231	25.28%
Total votes		704,997	100.00%

==== Mayor of New York City (1997) ====
1997 New York City mayoral election, Democratic primary
Party	Candidate	Votes	%
	Ruth Messinger	165,377	40.19%
	Al Sharpton	131,848	32.04%
	Sal Albanese	86,485	21.02%
	Eric Ruano-Melendez	17,663	4.29%
	Roland Rogers	10,086	2.45%
Total votes		411,459	100.00%

==== President of the United States (2004) ====
2004 Democratic Party presidential primaries
Party	Candidate	Votes	%
	John Kerry	10,045,891	60.75%
	John Edwards	3,207,048	19.39%
	Howard Dean	937,015	5.67%
	Dennis Kucinich	643,067	3.89%
	Wesley Clark	572,207	3.46%
	Al Sharpton	383,683	2.32%
	Uncommitted	155,388	0.94%
	Others	591,524	3.58%
Total votes		16,535,823	100.00%

== Television appearances ==
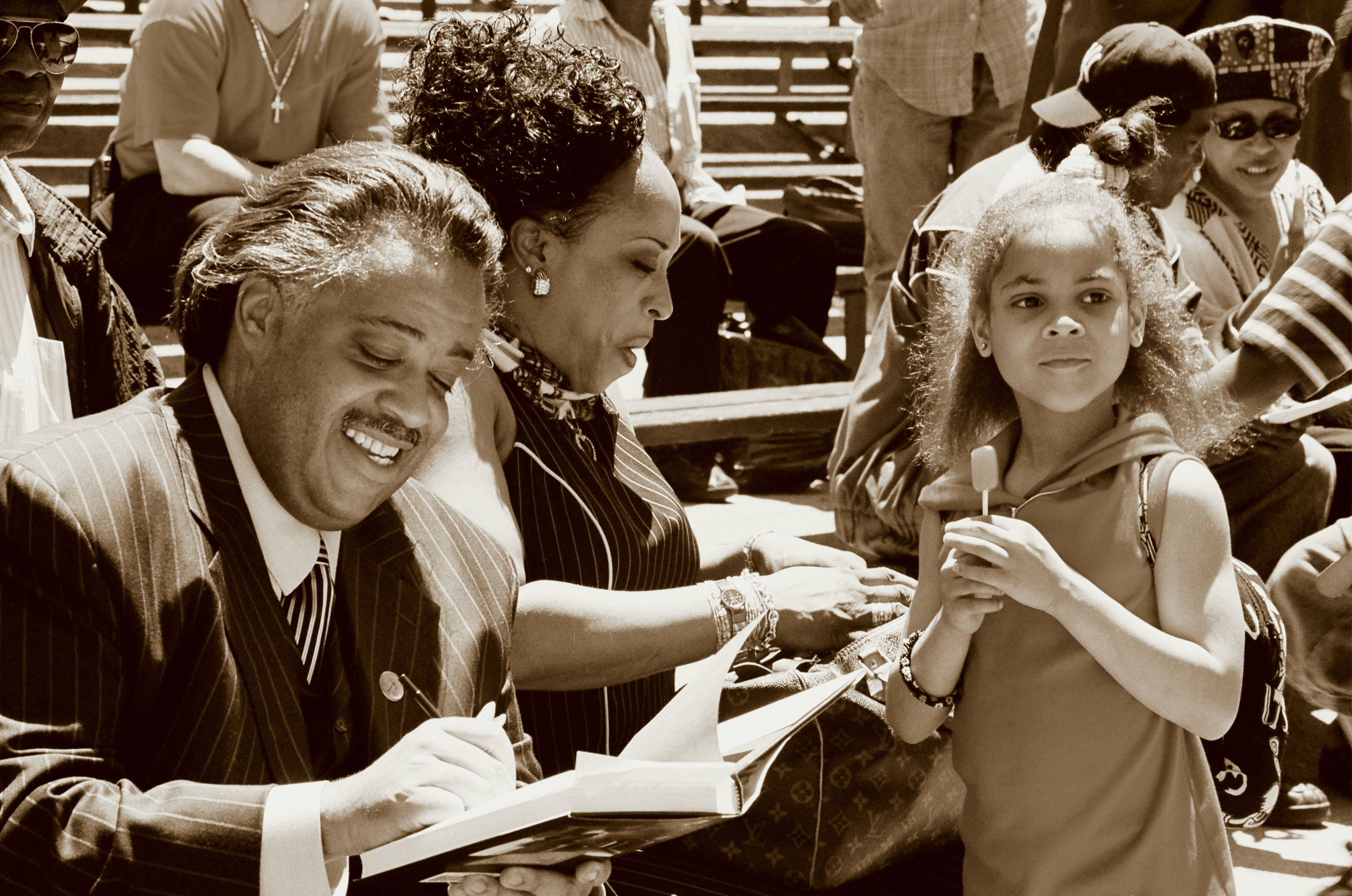
Sharpton at a book-signing in Harlem, 2008

Sharpton has made cameo appearances in the movies Cold Feet, Bamboozled, Mr. Deeds, and Malcolm X. He also has appeared in episodes of the television shows New York Undercover, Law & Order: Special Victims Unit, Girlfriends, My Wife and Kids, Rescue Me, Boston Legal and Empire. He hosted the original Spike TV reality television show I Hate My Job, and an episode of Saturday Night Live. He was a guest on Weekends at the DL on Comedy Central and has been featured in television ads for the Fernando Ferrer campaign for the New York City mayoral election, 2005. He also made a cameo appearance by telephone on the Food Network series, The Secret Life Of . . ., when host Jim O'Connor expressed disbelief that a restaurant owner who'd named a dish after Sharpton actually knew him.

In 1988, during an appearance on The Morton Downey Jr. Show, Sharpton and Congress of Racial Equality National Chairman Roy Innis got into a heated argument about the Tawana Brawley case and Innis shoved Sharpton to the floor.

In 1999, Sharpton appeared in a documentary about black nationalism hosted by Louis Theroux, as part of the "Weird Weekends" series.

During the 2005 Tony Awards, Sharpton appeared in a number put on by the cast of The 25th Annual Putnam County Spelling Bee.

In 2009, Sharpton appeared on an episode of Kathy Griffin: My Life on the D-List where he helped comedian Kathy Griffin prepare for an appearance at the Apollo Theater. He also introduced her stand-up performance there.

=== Broadcast hosting ===
In June 2005, Sharpton signed a contract with Matrix Media to produce and host a live two-hour daily talk program, but it never aired. In November 2005, Sharpton signed with Radio One to host a daily national talk radio program, which began airing on January 30, 2006, entitled Keepin It Real with Al Sharpton.

On August 29, 2011, Sharpton became the host of PoliticsNation, the MSNBC show which originally aired weeknights during the 6:00 p.m. Eastern Time hour. In October 2015 the program was moved to Sunday mornings, one hour per week. He continues to be a regular contributor to Morning Joe.

== Books ==
Sharpton has written or co-written four books, Go and Tell Pharaoh with Anthony Walton, Al on America with Karen Hunter, The Rejected Stone: Al Sharpton and the Path to American Leadership with Nick Chiles, and Rise Up: Confronting a Country at the Crossroads.

- Sharpton, Al; Walton, Anthony (March 1, 1996). Go and Tell Pharaoh: The Autobiography of the Reverend Al Sharpton. New York: Doubleday. ISBN 978-0385475839. OCLC 33948728.
- ——; Hunter, Karen (2002). Al on America. New York: Dafina Books. ISBN 9780758203502. OCLC 50702495.
- ——; Chiles, Nick (October 8, 2013). The Rejected Stone: Al Sharpton and the Path to American Leadership. New York: Cash Money Content. ISBN 9781936399475. OCLC 857568135.
- —— (September 29, 2020). Rise Up: Confronting a Country at the Crossroads. Foreword: Michael Eric Dyson. Toronto: Hanover Square Press. ISBN 9781335966629. OCLC 1196187885.

== See also ==
- Abner Louima
- List of civil rights leaders
