= Keepin' It Real with Al Sharpton =

Talk radio program

Keepin' It Real with Al Sharpton is a daily national talk radio program by New York City area civil rights activist Rev. Al Sharpton.

While his show is based at New York City's WWRL, Keepin It Real with Al Sharpton has also been broadcast on Sirius XM Satellite Radio since August 13, 2007.

The show is broadcast weekday evenings, from 8:00 PM to 10:00 PM in New York City. It also airs in 40 media markets and is syndicated by Reach Media, a subsidiary of Urban One.

In June 2005, Sharpton signed a contract with Matrix Media to produce and host a live two-hour daily talk program, which did not air. In November 2005, Sharpton signed with Radio One to host the program which began airing on January 30, 2006.
