= Henry Hewes (critic) =

American drama critic (1917–2006)

- Born: April 9, 1917; Boston, Massachusetts, U.S.
- Died: July 18, 2006 (aged 89); Manhattan, New York, U.S.
- Education: Columbia University (B.A.)

Henry Hewes (April 9, 1917 – July 18, 2006) was an American theater writer who worked as the drama critic for the Saturday Review weekly literary magazine from 1955 to 1979. He was the first major critic to regularly review regional and international theater. His interest in regional theater led him to found the American Theater Critics Association, the Tony Award for regional theater, and the American Theater Wing's design award, now called the Hewes Award. In 2002, he was inducted into the American Theater Hall of Fame.

== Early life and education ==
Hewes was born in Boston to a socially prominent family, the son of Margaret Gordon (Warman) and Henry Fox Hewes. His mother was a theater producer, and Hewes first became interested in theater at the age of ten. He began studying pre-med at Harvard University, but his studies were interrupted by World War II.

Hewes served in the Army Air Corps during hostilities. After the war, he shifted his focus to theater studies and graduated from Columbia University in 1949.

== Career ==
Hewes' first job in journalism was working as a copy boy at the New York Times. Encouraged by the critic Brooks Atkinson, he began writing arts profiles for the Times' Sunday Magazine.

From the Times, he went to the Saturday Review, a weekly magazine, where he worked as secondary drama critic to John Mason Brown. In 1955, Hewes was made the primary drama critic. He held that position until 1976, and became known for championing new works and playwrights. He was also known for being the first major critic to cover regional and international theater in addition to New York productions. In addition to his drama criticism, Hewes edited the annual Best Plays anthology from 1960 to 1964, bringing greater attention to new works and playwrights.

Hewes was primarily a critic and writer, but also did some theater directing. In 1972, he directed Bernie Kahn's Our Very Own Hole in the Ground at La MaMa Experimental Theatre Club in the East Village, Manhattan.

In 1974, Hewes established the American Theater Critics Association, partially due to his interest in regional theater. He also helped to found the Tony Award for regional theater and the American Theater Wing's design award, which is now called the Henry Hewes Design Award.

== Personal life ==
Hewes married Jane Fowle, with whom he had three sons: Henry, Tucker, and Havelock. Hewes died in Manhattan on July 18, 2006, at the age of 89.

== Legacy and honors ==
- Elected president of the New York Drama Critics' Circle and the Drama Desk
- Inducted into the American Theater Hall of Fame (2002)
