= Theresa Castro =

Theresa Castro (February 15, 1917 – March 2, 2002), was the wife of Bernard Castro, the inventor of the Castro Convertible sofa.

Theresa was born Theresa Barabas on a dairy farm outside McKeesport, Pennsylvania, on February 15, 1917. Her father was Hungarian and her mother Austrian. At the age of 13, Theresa entered a convent to fulfill a promise her mother had made to an order of nuns. She eventually left, promising her mother that she would 'do more good from outside the cloistered walls.' Bernard Castro married Theresa Barabas on Valentine’s Day 1942. Their two children were Bernard Jr. and Bernadette. Bernard Jr. died at the age of 26.

Bernadette became famous in the New York Metropolitan Areas as the 4 year old living trademark of the company. It was Theresa’s idea to use their daughter Bernadette, starting at the age of 4, with her white nightgown and sausage curls, in television commercials for the sofas as the company’s living trademark. The commercial – shown 40,000 times in various forms – was one of the first local advertisements to run on television and was said to be the first to feature a child. Theresa assisted Bernard answering the phones and stuffing cushions in the young company, which eventually became a retailer and manufacturer of fine convertible furniture – Castro Convertibles.

Theresa was an original investor and the first Chairmen of the Board of Gold Coast Magazine in Fort Lauderdale, Florida, which is celebrating its 50th anniversary in 2015. She was also a huge supporter of Ocala Magazine in Ocala, Florida.

Mrs. Castro’s many charitable endeavors included the Florida School for the Deaf and Blind in Saint Augustine, Florida. Theresa was appointed by the Florida state legislature to the Board of The Florida School for the Deaf and the Blind and led the fundraising effort to build the school’s interfaith chapel. The chapel was renamed in her honor on November 15, 1986. Theresa received an Honorary Doctor of Science Degree from the Florida Institute of Technology in 1973. She also served on the board of Embry–Riddle University in Daytona.

Together with her husband, Theresa and Bernard Castro founded the Golden Hills Academy in Ocala, Florida. Theresa loved children and the school provided many opportunities for learning and equestrian activities.

Theresa was so passionate about finding a cure for cancer that she founded the Royal Dames for Cancer Research in Fort Lauderdale, which continues to raise money for Nova Southeastern University’s cancer research lab in Fort Lauderdale. Theresa also founded the Royal Dames chapter in Ocala, Florida raising funds for cancer research at Shands Teaching Hospital at the University of Florida. Theresa also spent much of her time raising money for the American Heart Fund both in Fort Lauderdale and Ocala, Florida.

Theresa was a proud patriot. She and Bernard dedicated a portion of Castro Farms in Ocala for annual practice maneuvers by the Florida National Guard. The National Guard erected a sign on the property calling it “The Castro Drop Zone.” Each year after the helicopter maneuvers, the Guardsmen and their families were all invited to the Castro homestead for a barbecue. As a gesture of appreciation Theresa and Bernard were made Honorary Green Berets.

In October 2014, the city of Ocala named a street between its two medical centers, Honorary Theresa and Bernard Castro Avenue, in honor of the Castro’s philanthropic work in the area.
