= Anthony Walton (poet) =

American poet and writer (born 1960)

Anthony Walton (born 1960) is an African American poet, writer, and anthologist. He is the author of two major works of nonfiction: The End of Respectability (Godine, 2024) and Mississippi: An American Journey (Knopf, 1997). He is also a celebrated poet, with poems in the New Yorker, Poetry Ireland, The Black Scholar, Obsidian, The American Scholar, Kenyon Review, the Academy of American Poets, and the Library of America's anthology African American Poetry: 250 Years of Struggle and Song. His full-length collection, Celestial Mechanics, is forthcoming from Godine in September 2026, and his poems also appear in the chapbooks, The Monk Variations (Lily Poetry Review Books, 2026), 1968 (Staircase Books, 2025), and Cricket Weather (Blackberry Books, 1995). He is coauthor, with Kareem Abdul-Jabbar, of the best-selling Brothers-in-Arms: The Epic Story of the 761st Tank Battalion, (Random House, 2004) and coauthor, with Al Sharpton, of Go and Tell Pharaoh (Doubleday, 1996). He edited, with Michael S. Harper, two major anthologies of African American poetry: Vintage Book of African American Poetry and Every Shut-eye Ain't Asleep: African American Poetry since 1945. He has taught for thirty-two years at Bowdoin College in Brunswick, Maine.

== Early years and education ==
Walton grew up in Aurora and Batavia, Illinois, but both of his parents were born and raised in Jim Crow Mississippi. His parents met and married in Illinois; his father, Claude E. Walton, served with distinction in the U.S. Air Force and worked in the Chicago mills. His mother, Dorothy J. Walton, worked for the Aurora East School District for over 25 years.

Walton studied and earned his B.A. at the University of Notre Dame and received an M.F.A. from Brown University.

While studying at the University of Notre Dame he participated in ROTC, and wrote articles for the school newspaper, The Observer, and the school magazine, The Scholastic, which helped start his writing career. Browsing in the library, he came across the Collected Poems of Wallace Stevens, which heightened his interest in poetry.

Upon graduation, Walton moved to New York where he began writing for magazines such as Seven Days, Harper's, the New York Times Magazine, Oxford American, The Atlantic, and The Utney Reader. Writing for Seven Days, he witnessed the massive, impassioned protest march through the Bensonhurst neighborhood of Brooklyn after the Yusuf Hawkins murder in 1989.

== Career ==
In 1989, Walton wrote an essay for the New York Times Magazine, "Willie Horton and Me," concerning race issues of the time, which brought him national acclaim and spoke to a dawning new reality for African Americans after the Civil Rights Movement. In 1998, Walton won a Whiting Award in nonfiction and poetry.

Walton has taught at Bowdoin College for 32 years and has also taught at the University of Notre Dame and Brown University.

== Works ==
- Celestial Mechanics (Godine, 2026)
- The Monk Variations (Lily Poetry Review Books, 2026)
- 1968 (Staircase Books, 2025)
- The End of Respectability, (Godine, 2024)
- Brothers In Arms: The Epic Story of the 761st Tank Battalion, WWII's Forgotten Heroes with Kareem Abdul-Jabbar, (Random House, 2004)
- The Vintage Book of African American Poetry (Co-editor with Michael S. Harper) (Vintage, Random House, 2002)
- Mississippi: An American Journey (Knopf, 1997)
- Go and Tell Pharaoh with Reverend Al Sharpton, (Doubleday, 1996)
- Cricket Weather (Blackberry Books, 1995)
- Every Shut Eye Ain't Asleep: Anthology Of Poetry by African Americans Since 1945 (Co-editor with Michael S. Harper) (Little Brown, 1994)
