= 1994 United States Senate election in New York =

- November 8, 1994
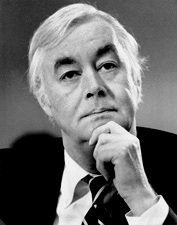

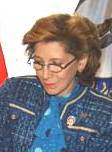
Nominee	Pat Moynihan	Bernadette Castro
Party	Democratic	Republican
Alliance	Liberal	Conservative
Popular vote	2,646,541	1,988,308
Percentage	55.25%	41.51%
- County results Moynihan: 40–50% 50–60% 60–70% 70–80% 80–90% Castro: 40–50% 50–60% 60–70%
U.S. senator before election
Pat Moynihan
Democratic
Elected U.S. Senator
Pat Moynihan
Democratic

The 1994 United States Senate election in New York was held November 8, 1994. Incumbent Democratic U.S. Senator Daniel Patrick Moynihan won re-election to a fourth term. As of 2024, this is the last time a man has won the Class 1 Senate seat from New York.

== Democratic Primary ==
=== Candidates ===
- Daniel Patrick Moynihan, incumbent U.S. Senator
- Al Sharpton, civil rights activist, Baptist minister and talk show host

=== Results ===
Democratic Primary Results by County: Moynihan: 50–60%; 60–70%; 70–80%; 80–90%; 90–100%

Democratic Primary Results
Party	Candidate	Votes	%
Democratic	Daniel Patrick Moynihan (incumbent)	526,766	74.72%
Democratic	Al Sharpton	178,231	25.28%
Total votes		704,997	100.00%

== Conservative Primary ==
=== Candidates ===
- Bernadette Castro, CEO of Castro Convertibles
- Henry Hewes, real estate developer and perennial candidate

=== Results ===
Conservative Primary Results
Party	Candidate	Votes	%
Conservative	Bernadette Castro	12,300	62.91%
Conservative	Henry Hewes	7,251	37.09%
Total votes		19,551	100.00%

== General election ==
=== Candidates ===
- Daniel Patrick Moynihan (D/L), incumbent U.S. Senator
- Bernadette Castro (R/C), CEO of Castro Convertibles

=== Campaign ===
1994 was significant for the Republican Revolution, mostly as a referendum against President Bill Clinton and his health care plan, and was seen as a tough year for Democratic incumbents. Moynihan, however, was New York State's most popular politician at the time, and ran ahead of all other Democrats competing statewide.

Republican Castro was running for office for the first time and had trouble raising funds due to being seen as unlikely to win; at times during the race she trailed by up to 30 percentage points. She portrayed herself as a fiscally conservative, socially moderate Republican in the mold of Governor of New Jersey Christine Todd Whitman, and attempted to portray Moynihan as excessively liberal and prone to government spending. But Moynihan repeated his past strong performance among upstate voters, in addition to the usual Democratic strongholds in New York City.

=== Results ===
General Election Results
Party	Candidate	Votes	%	±%
Democratic	Patrick Moynihan	2,528,387	52.78	
Liberal	Patrick Moynihan	118,154	2.47	
Total	Patrick Moynihan (Incumbent)	2,646,541	55.25	▼11.77
Republican	Bernadette Castro	1,711,760	35.73	
Conservative	Bernadette Castro	276,548	5.77	
Total	Bernadette Castro	1,988,308	41.51	▲10.46
Right to Life	Henry Hewes	95,954	2.00	▲0.93
Independence	Ismael Betancourt, Jr.	26,650	0.56	N/A
Libertarian	Norma Segal	17,991	0.38	▲0.18
Socialist Workers	Naomi Craine	14,892	0.31	▲0.12
Majority		658,233	13.74	−22.16
Total votes		4,790,336	100.00	
Democratic hold				

== See also ==
- 1994 United States Senate elections
