= Bernadette Castro =

American politician

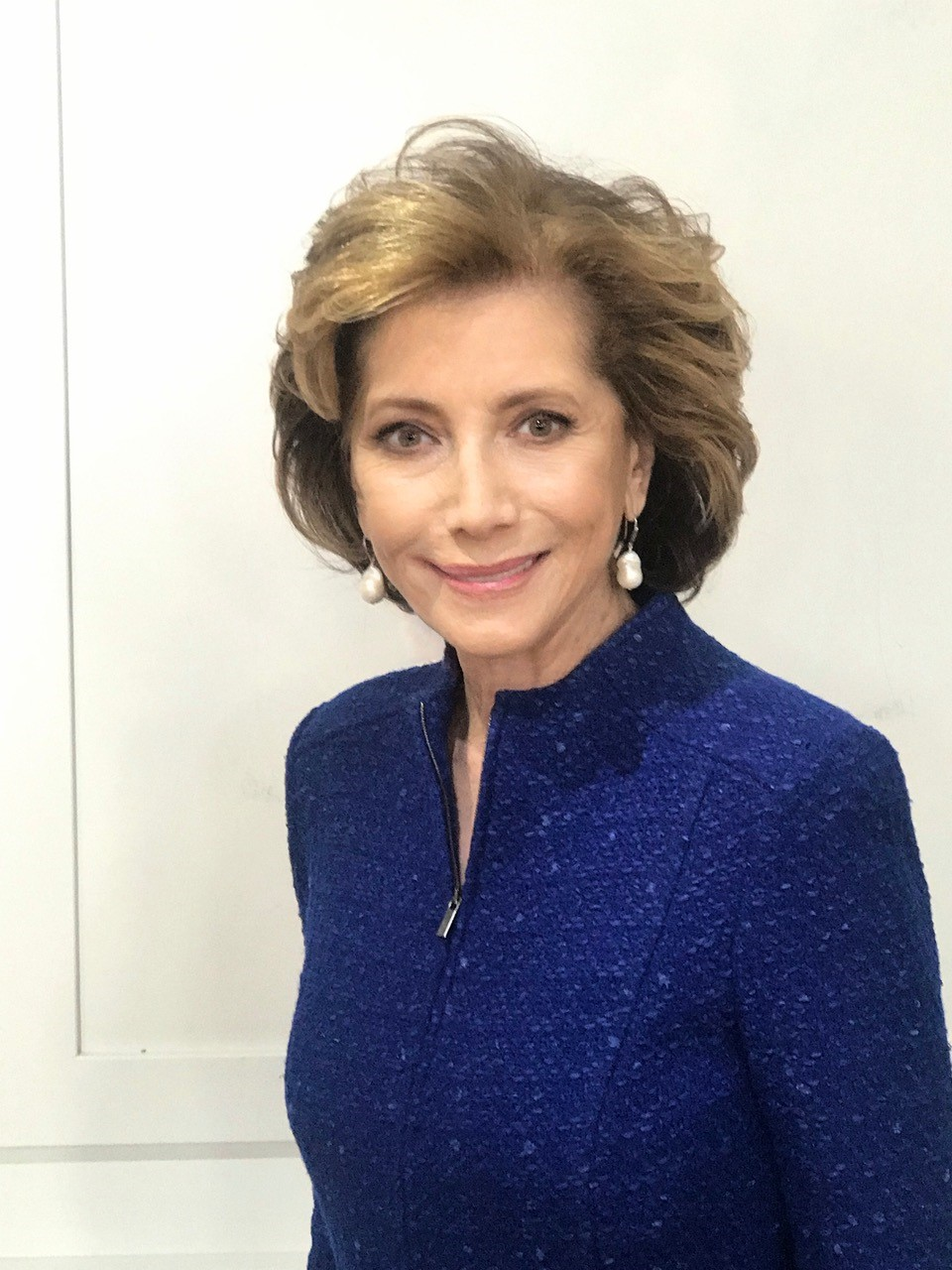
- Castro in 2026

Personal details
- Born: July 10, 1944 (age 82) New York City, U.S.
- Party: Republican
- Spouses: David Austin (m. 1967; div. 1978); Peter Guida (m. 1979–2015)
- Children: 4
- Education: University of Florida (BA, MEd)
- Website: Official website

Bernadette Castro (born July 10, 1944) is an American businesswoman and former New York politician who served in the cabinet of former New York Governor George E. Pataki. She is a partner with her family in Castro Properties.

In the early 1960s, she pursued a singing career with mild success. Castro recorded several singles, with her 1964 single "His Lips Get in the Way" earning a spot on the Billboard Hot 100 chart.

After earning her master's degree at the University of Florida, she became the Head of School for Golden Hills Academy in Ocala Florida. Earlier, upon receiving her undergraduate degree, Bernadette worked in the advertising and promotions department of Castro Convertibles on a limited basis, and later moved into her role as the company's CEO.

== Early life and education ==
Bernadette became involved with the Castro Convertibles business at a very early age. As a 4-year-old child, Castro starred in the brand's iconic television commercials that ran over 40,000 times, earning her the distinction of being the most televised child in America. With these commercials, and subsequent parodies of the commercials on shows such as The Tonight Show Starring Johnny Carson, The Jackie Gleason Show, and Milton Berle's Texaco Star Theatre, Bernadette catapulted her father Bernard's innovative convertible couch to national fame by illustrating how the convertibles were "So easy to open, even a child can do it!" At the age of twelve, Bernadette starred in the first live color television commercial.

Bernadette graduated from Pine Crest, a college preparatory school in Fort Lauderdale, Florida, where she received a special alumni award. She then went on to earn a Bachelors of Science in Broadcast Journalism from the University of Florida in 1966, where was inducted into the College of Journalism's Hall of Fame. In 1978, she graduated with honors with a master's degree in Secondary School Administration from the University of Florida, and became the first woman to receive the University's College of Journalism Distinguished Alumnus award. Castro holds honorary degrees from the following institutions: St. Joseph's College – Honorary Doctor of Law (1993); Dowling College – Honorary Doctor of Law (1996), and Daemon College – Honorary Doctor of Humane Letters (2001).

== Career ==
=== Singing career ===
Bernadette recorded several singles in the 1960s for Columbia Pictures' recording subsidiary Colpix Records, including a girl group–style record, "His Lips Get in the Way" which made the Billboard 100 chart. Bernadette's singles have been compared to top girls groups of the era like the Shangri-Las and The Ronettes. She released additional singles on Colpix including "A Girl In Love Forgives" and "Sports Car Sally," popular among many girl group collectors for its hot-rod theme.

=== Real estate ===
While Bernadette sold the furniture division of the family's company in 1993 to Krause Furniture, her family retained ownership of the brand's real estate and Bernadette remained active in the family's commercial real estate business with properties along the East Coast. Terri Keogh, Bernadette's daughter, is CEO of Castro Properties. Castro Properties' flagship property is The Castro Building, which is located in Manhattan's Flatiron District at 43 West 23rd Street. Bernard Castro, founder of Castro Convertibles, purchased the property in 1972 and all eight floors were the well-known flagship showroom for Castro Convertibles. The building's current tenants include Eately's Corporate Headquarters, Spectum, and Barclay's Bank.

=== New York State Parks Commissioner ===
In 1995, Bernadette was appointed Commissioner of the New York Office of Parks, Recreation and Historic Preservation by Governor George E. Pataki, a cabinet post she held for twelve years. During her tenure from 1995 to 2006, New York State preserved over one million acres of land through acquisition for state parks, donations and conservation easements. Much of this was funded by a $1.75 billion environmental bond, which was authorized in 1996.

Among her many accomplishments as Commissioner, Bernadette worked with Speaker Newt Gingrich and the Trust for Public Land in 1996 to acquire the 18,000 acre Sterling Forest property for $55 million. The property protects approximately 25% of New Jersey's drinking water. Sterling Forest II, an additional 1,065 acres, was purchased later in Castro's term for $8 million. In 2001, President George W. Bush appointed Bernadette the Vice Chair of the Advisory Council on Historic Preservation, as she also served as New York's Historic Preservation Officer.

At the direction of Governor George Pataki, Bernadette and her agency brought the United States Open Golf Championship to Bethpage State Park, the first time the Open was held at a public golf course. In accordance with an agreement that Castro negotiated with the United States Golf Association (USGA) the U.S. Open Championship returned to Bethpage State Park in 2009. Castro was invited to serve on the Advisory Committees for the 2019 PGA Championship and the Ryder Cup in 2025.

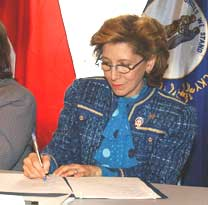
Castro on the Advisory Council on Historic Preservation in 2004

In 2003, the National Recreation and Park Association awarded New York State Parks, the National Gold Medal, designating them as the country's best state parks system. Also in 2003, the agency was recognized for its comprehensive efforts to save Governor's Island in New York City which was transferred from the federal government back to the people of New York.

== United States Senate run ==
In 1994, Bernadette decided to pursue her passion for politics, running for the U.S. Senate and winning 42% of the votes against four-term Senator Daniel Patrick Moynihan.

=== 1994 NYS Republican ticket ===
- Governor: George Pataki
- Lieutenant Governor: Elizabeth McCaughey
- Comptroller: Herbert London
- Attorney General: Dennis Vacco
- U.S. Senate: Bernadette Castro

== Awards ==
Bernadette has been honored with a number of awards for her work in philanthropy, conservation, parks, business including, an induction into the Long Island Hall of Fame in 1990, the Ellis Island Medal of Honor in 1995, the Lifetime Achievement Award from the Advancement of Commerce, Industry and Technology (ACIT) in 2009, the Lifetime Achievement Award from Long Island Business News in 2008, the Service Award for Land and Water Conservation Fund from the National Park Service in 2006, the Governor's Parks & Preservation Award, presented by Governor George Pataki in 2005, the Women in Conservation Award from the National Audubon Society in 2005, the Theodore Roosevelt Medal for Conservation from The History Channel in 2003, the Cornelius Amory Pugsley Award, from the American Academy for Park and Recreation Administration in association with The National Park Foundation in 2002, and the Theodore Roosevelt Legacy of Conservation Award in 2001. In 2017, Bernadette was honored by the Franciscan Friars of the Atonement at their annual Sharing Hope Celebration Dinner with the Graymoor Award. In 2024, she received an award from The Ocala Royal Dames for Cancer Research for her steadfast dedication to the organization; and in 2026, she received the Mary Phipps award from Old Westbury Gardens on Long Island.

== Community and charity work ==
Bernadette offers her support to a number of community organizations and charitable causes. She acts as fundraising auctioneer for two organizations, The INN (Interfaith Nutrition Network), and VOCAL (Voices of Change Animal League), and also serves as the Master of Ceremonies for New York Presbyterian/Weill Cornell Hospital at The M.R. Greenberg Distinguished Service Award Dinner. Additionally, Bernadette lends her support to organizations such as the Ocala Royal Dames for Cancer Research, and the Fort Lauderdale Royal Dames of Cancer Research.

The Ocala Royal Dames for Cancer Research and the Fort Lauderdale Royal Dames of Cancer Research, were both founded by Bernadette's mother, Theresa Castro. She is a yearly contributor to the scholarship funds for The Florida School for the Deaf and the Blind, Mercy College, the Florida Institute of Technology, and the College of Central Florida. Bernadette serves on the Board of the Catholic Faith Network, is a member of the Advisory Boards of the Wildlife Center of Long Island, and The New York Landmarks Conservancy. She is also an active member of the Columbus Citizens Foundation, an organization her father, Bernard Castro, co-founded.

== Personal life ==
Bernadette has four children: Terri Austin Keogh, CEO of Castro Properties who lives on Long Island, New York, David Austin, a former trial lawyer who lives in Jupiter, Florida, Jonathan Austin who works for Castro Properties and lives in Connecticut, and Bernard Austin who is an IAI architect, and lives in Wilmington, North Carolina. She also has nine grandchildren, and two step-grandchildren.

Party political offices
Preceded by Robert McMillan	Republican nominee for U.S. Senator from New York (Class 1); 1994	Succeeded by Rick Lazio
