= Tanya McDowell =

American prisoner

Tanya McDowell is an American woman who served five years in prison after a plea deal related to falsifying her residence to change school districts. McDowell and her six-year-old son were homeless, McDowell didn't have an address to get her son into a good school, so she lied on admission papers to ensure her son could have an education. McDowell has said she was never informed of the zoning rules in place in Norwalk, CT and had no knowledge that this would send her to prison. After the school board found out about the lie, McDowell's son was removed from the school. McDowell was then charged for five years in prison on the accounts or federal larceny as well as other criminal charges. She was also arrested and charged for offering drugs and prostitutes to undercover police officers. McDowell was charged with seven counts in total. McDowell had a previous record of bank robbery and weapons crimes.

McDowell has received national media attention from articles and viral social media posts juxtaposing aspects of her case with Felicity Huffman's 14 day sentence for a federal crime as part of the 2019 college admissions bribery scandal. The misleading nature of some media attention led to a Snopes fact-checking entry which argued the Huffman and McDowell cases were not directly comparable. Felicity Huffman is an actress best known for her role on ABC's "Desperate Housewives." Huffman was charged with fraud and conspiracy to commit mail fraud after she paid Rick Singer $15,000 to raise her daughters SAT scores to admit her to a good university. Huffman pleaded guilty to her counts of fraud, but only set 14 days in prison, also paying a $250,000 fine. McDowell and Huffman's cases are often compared because of the differences in the parties involved and how the two women were charged with different sentences for committing similar crimes under very different circumstances. Articles comparing the two cases have determined that the two cases are too different to truly compare. McDowell was facing other charges along with larceny, which gave her a longer sentence than Huffman who was just sentenced under fraud.

Prosecutors from the U.S. attorney's office in Boston in Operation Varsity Blues cited McDowell's case as well as five others in their arguments for the length of prison time for convictions in the admissions scandal. Her case has also been cited in discussions of possible barriers to legitimate employment, educational zoning, university admission criteria, and increased oversight and scrutiny in public housing.
