= Bernard Castro =

American inventor (1904–1991)

- Born: August 11, 1904; Sicily, Italy
- Died: August 24, 1991 (aged 87)
- Known for: Inventing the modern convertible couch (Castro Convertibles) Founding member of The Columbus Citizens Foundation
- Spouse: Theresa Castro (deceased 2002)
- Children: Bernardo Castro (deceased 1974) Bernadette Castro
- Awards: New York City Liberty Medal (presented by Mayor Ed Koch) Knight’s Cross of the Order of Merit of the Italian Republica Horatio Alger Award (1963)
- Honours: Induction into the Knights of the Holy Sepulcher and the Knights of Malta.
- Website: https://castroproperties.com/

Bernard Castro (August 11, 1904 – August 24, 1991) was the inventor of the modern convertible couch.

Born in Sicily, Castro emigrated to the United States in 1919. He never finished high school, but went to work as an upholsterer's apprentice. In 1931 with $400 in capital he opened his first store, which eventually became a chain. At his death in 1991, he had sold over 5 million of his convertible sofas through 48 retail showrooms in 12 states, becoming a multimillionaire in the process.

Castro married Theresa Barabas on Valentine's Day 1942. Their two children were Bernard Jr. and Bernadette. Bernadette became locally famous in the New York area as the company's official four-year-old spokesperson. Theresa died in March 2002, aged 85. Castro Convertibles was acquired in 1993 by Krause Furniture.

Bernard oversaw all aspects of the company's product development, production, and sales. He is credited with repositioning the sofa bed as a living room furniture piece, drawing on his interior design background to introduce more aesthetics into designs in the convertible furniture category. He employed a multi-platform advertising approach spanning television, radio, and print across all markets where Castro Convertibles maintained showrooms. Among the company's notable products was the "Scotch n Sofa," a sofa that converted into a bar with a built-in turntable. Castro Convertibles became a significant presence in the convertible furniture market under his leadership. Bernard also sought to differentiate the company's showrooms as retail destinations, including the construction of a 35-foot boat within the Fort Lauderdale showroom as a customer attraction.

Bernard donated his time and resources generously to a number of causes throughout the course of his life, including the Columbus Citizens Foundation (Bernard was a founding member of the organization), Boys Town of Italy, the Anti-Defamation League of B'nai B'rith, the American Heart Association, and the Royal Dames for Cancer Research. Bernard was a recipient of the coveted Horatio Alger Award in 1963. The award is given to entrepreneurial and nonprofit leaders who have achieved the American Dream via extraordinary accomplishments. Bernard was also a member of the Knight of Malta and the Knight of Holy Sepulcher. In 2014, Bernard was one of four inductees into The American Furniture Hall of Fame at the Foundation's annual banquet in High Point, North Carolina. Bernard also received a bronze plaque on the Foundation's Walk of Fame and is featured in Foundation's Wall of Fame exhibit, which are both located in Furniture Plaza in High Point. Castro received an Honorary Doctor of Commercial Science Ph.D. from Mercy College in Dobbs Ferry, New York in 1974.

Bernard was a founding member of the Florida Council of 100 and a member of the 23rd Street Association in New York City. Bernard spent many years in Florida and was very active in the Ocala/Marion County Chamber of Commerce and was also a huge supporter of the Florida National Guard. He dedicated several hundred acres of his Ocala land for a Special National Guard Drop Zone and was made an honorary Green Beret and upon his death there was a tribute in the United States Armed Forces publication, Stars and Stripes.

Bernadette Castro managed the sale to Krause but retained the large portfolio of commercial real estate her father had acquired, both retail and industrial. Those properties in New York, Florida, Connecticut, and Virginia put the family in the real estate business. The iconic Castro Convertible brand was retired until 2010, when Bernadette Castro and her children bought back the intellectual property and relaunched the business with one of the most popular original products, the Castro Convertible Ottoman. Rather than retail locations, the new Castro is available online for purchase by both consumers and the lodging and resort industry.
