= National Youth Movement =

National Youth Movement was established in 1971, by Reverend Al Sharpton at the age of 16 years. After Jesse Jackson left the Southern Christian Leadership Conference over his administrative suspension, and Sharpton—who was mentored by Jackson—left the SCLC in protest and formed the National Youth Movement.

The mission of the organization was fighting drugs and raising money for impoverished children in the inner cities.
