= 1982 Nebraska State Treasurer election =

- November 2, 1982
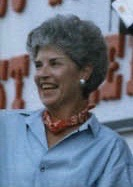

Candidate	Kay Orr	Orval Keyes
Party	Republican	Democratic
Popular vote	312,754	185,503
Percentage	62.75%	37.22%
- County results Orr: 50–60% 60–70% 70–80% 80–90%
State Treasurer before election
Kay Orr
Republican
Elected State Treasurer
Kay Orr
Republican

The 1982 Nebraska State Treasurer election was held on November 2, 1982, to elect the Nebraska State Treasurer. Republican incumbent Kay Orr, who was appointed in 1981 following Frank Marsh's resignation, easily won election to a full term, defeating Democratic former member of the Nebraska Legislature Orval Keyes by twenty-five percentage points and winning every county in the state. With her victory, Orr became the first woman elected to a statewide constitutional office in Nebraska.

== Republican primary ==
=== Candidates ===
- Kay Orr, incumbent Nebraska State Treasurer (1981–1987)
- Shirley Marsh, member of the Nebraska Legislature and wife of former Nebraska State Treasurer Frank Marsh
- Kurt Rasmussen
- Wayne Swanson, former Nebraska State Treasurer (1967–1975)

=== Results ===
Republican primary results
Party	Candidate	Votes	%
Republican	Kay Orr	61,009	39.97%
Republican	Shirley Marsh	53,566	35.10%
Republican	Wayne Swanson	21,068	13.80%
Republican	Kurt Rasmussen	16,946	11.10%
Write-in		45	0.03%
Total votes		152,634	100.00%

== Democratic primary ==
=== Candidates ===
- Orval Keyes, former member of the Nebraska Legislature (1969–1981)

=== Results ===
Democratic primary results
Party	Candidate	Votes	%
Democratic	Orval Keyes	93,535	99.42%
Write-in		547	0.58%
Total votes		94,082	100.00%

== General election ==
=== Results ===
1982 Nebraska State Treasurer results
Party	Candidate	Votes	%	±%
Republican	Kay Orr	312,754	62.75%	−4.91%
Democratic	Orval Keyes	185,503	37.22%	+4.89%
Write-in		185	0.04%	+0.03%
Total votes		452,906	100.00%	
Republican hold				
