= Nebraska Governor's Mansion =

Historic house in Nebraska, United States

- U.S. National Register of Historic Places
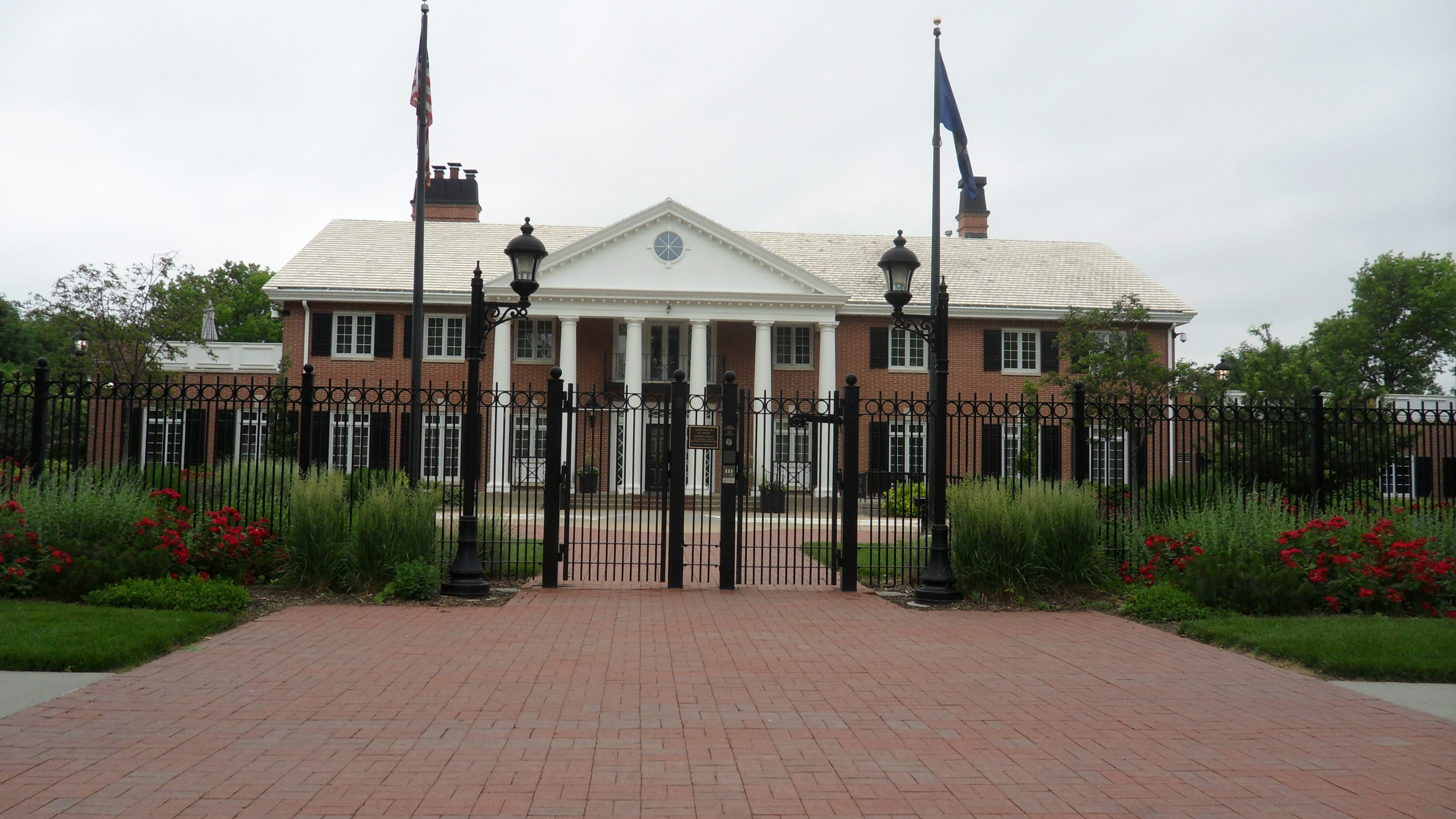

- Location within Nebraska Location within the United States
- Location: 1425 H St., Lincoln, Nebraska
- Coordinates: 40°48′23″N 96°42′1″W
- Built: 1957
- Architect: Solheim, Selmer A.; Broer, W.J., Construction Co.
- Architectural style: Classical Revival
- NRHP reference No.: 08000173
- Added to NRHP: March 12, 2008

The Nebraska Governor's Mansion is the official residence of the governor of Nebraska and his family. Located in Lincoln, Nebraska, it is a modified Georgian Colonial home which began operation as the governor's residence on March 17, 1958.

== Description ==
The Nebraska Governor's Mansion sits on an entire city block, emphasizing the importance of the office and the building. The grounds are landscaped to include large lawns, gardens, walking paths, and a fountain surrounded by an imposing wrought-iron fence which was added in the late 1990s.

The primary entrance to the residence on the north facade is off-center and marked by six white Doric columns which support a two-story dentiled pediment featuring a high roundel window. The twelve-paneled door is flanked by sidelights and a transom window all of which have cross-hatch muntins. The doorknob is from the original governor's mansion which was demolished in the mid-1950s.

The windows on all sides of the rectangular, brick building feature decorative shutters and jack arch lintels. On the west side of the building is a one-story, three-stall garage with flat roof that doubles as a porch for the adjacent second-story guestrooms. A one-story sun room was added to the east side of the building to balance the opposite garage and is similarly by a porch which is also surrounded by white wood panels and brick columns. Windows on the east and west sides of the building are less formally arranged than those on the front of the building, focusing more on privacy and comfort inside the home than appearances outside, with single rather than double windows in bathrooms.

== History ==
=== 1899 to 1955 ===
The original Nebraska Governor's Mansion was a Neoclassical Revival private home built in 1890 for D. E. Thompson. In 1899, the state of Nebraska purchased the property, its furnishings, and the two lots upon which it sat from Thompson for $21,385 ($828,000 in 2025 dollars). However, beginning in the mid-twentieth century, the age and floor plan of the building made it a poor choice for the governor's residence. Portions of the building had been condemned by the fire department and it was felt that the private family areas of the building were too large while the reception areas of the building were too small.

From 1945 to 1953, the Nebraska legislature discussed various solutions to the problem of the governor's residence, including purchasing a different building and accepting the donation of Frank H. Woods' private home as the new residence. In 1953, it was decided that renovating an existing building would be more expensive than building a new structure, and in 1955 the Nebraska legislature allocated $200,000 to purchasing the lots surrounding the existing governor's mansion and constructing a new mansion.

=== Planning of current residence ===
The incumbent governor at the time, Victor Anderson, took an active role in the design process for the mansion, but was careful to distance himself from the image of a man "feathering his own nest" with public money. Anderson requested the plans for the Florida Governor's Mansion and personally visited the Arkansas Governor's Mansion for inspiration. Furthermore, Anderson enlisted the help of the wives of former governors of Nebraska, asking for their input. Mrs. Elizabeth Peterson, wife of former governor Val Peterson, suggested that the first floor of the mansion be reserved for all official, formal, and public functions while the personal residence of the governor's family be separated to the second floor of the mansion. Mrs. Peterson's suggestion was carried through to the final design of the current building.

Besides the efforts of Governor Anderson, three prominent local architects—Frank Latenser, president of the Nebraska State Architects' Association; Edward J. Sessinghaus, former president of the Nebraska State Architects' Association; and Professor Linus Burr Smith, the head of the University of Nebraska School of Architecture—were named to a committee to study the project and select an architect for the project. The State Building Commission selected Lincoln architect Selmer A. Solheim to design the project in January 1956.

Solheim's preliminary designs were conscious of the site's proximity to the State Capitol Building and strove to complement the design of the Capitol with Indiana limestone, however, the Building Commission rejected these proposals due to cost concerns and instead decided that the new mansion would be made of locally sourced and cheaper red brick. Before demolition began on the former Governor's Mansion, Solheim selected several interior furnishings to repurpose in the new construction and an additional 300 items were auctioned to the public, raising an additional $2,416 ($29,000 in 2025 dollars) for the construction of the new mansion.

The plans for the new mansion were published in August 1956 and instantly garnered both praise and criticism. Solheim described the design as "Modified Georgian Revival," which he chose to pay homage to a traditional, American style of architecture. Solheim, who was well known for his innovative designs which embraced contemporary design theory, especially the International Style, defended his decision to create a more traditional building because "the contemporary styles ... might appear quite dated 25 to 30 years from now."

Several local architects criticized the designs, most notably a former architect of the Nebraska State Capitol, Harry F. Cunningham. In an editorial piece, Cunningham explained that despite his "deep personal affection for Selmer Solheim" and his "high regard for [Solheim's] professional attainments," he believed that the new mansion would look like a "lost stray cat in the neighborhood of the distinguished Capitol." Cunningham particularly disparaged the use of "pink brick" alongside the "warm gray stone of the Capitol," which he blamed entirely on the State Building Commission, who he claimed did not possess "any modicum of professional knowledge in building matters or any slightest suspicion of taste in such matters." According to Cunningham, the design itself was perfectly acceptable in a different locale, but lamented its employment in this project, saying, "I am sorry that the distinguished architect, Selmer Solheim, was forced to inflict this sorry anachronism upon the people of Nebraska."

While many architects disparaged the plans, several important local architects defended the design, including Frank Latenser, a member of the committee who had selected Solheim. Cunningham had introduced a resolution at a quarterly meeting of the Nebraska Chapter of the American Institute of Architects to ask Governor Anderson to request that Solheim redesign the building. Latenser and others convinced the AIA not to pass the resolution and personally convinced Cunningham of the merits of the plans, after which Cunningham stated that he was "quite ready to call off the war."

Construction was completed and the mansion was opened to the public for tours in March 1958. An estimated 35,000 citizens from across the state toured the mansion within the first two days of opening. On the day of the mansion's opening, Solheim published a poem to honor the building, the workers who had constructed it, and the taxpayers of Nebraska who had supported the venture;

"All have a share in the beauty,
All have a part in the plan
What does it matter what duty
Falls to the lot of man?
Someone has blended the plaster
And someone has carried the stone:
Neither the man nor the master
Ever has builded alone.
Making a roof from the weather,
Or building a house for the king,
Only by working together
Have men accomplished a thing."

=== Renovation ===
Former Nebraska First Gentleman Bill Orr led efforts to refurbish the mansion during the late 1980s. Orr moved into the mansion with his wife, Governor Kay Orr, in 1987, and described the then interior decor as "early Holiday Inn" noting that "We can do better." Bill Orr authored a cookbook, The First Gentleman's Cookbook, with all proceeds going to a $200,000 fund to renovate and refurbish the mansion. Orr published recipes submitted by Barbara Bush, Nancy Reagan, Warren Buffett, Johnny Carson, Katharine Hepburn, Tom Osborne, and Dick Cavett in his cookbook.

== Bibliography ==
- City of Lincoln, Nebraska Building Permit, #80261.
- Lincoln City Directory, 1938.
- Lincoln Journal and Star, 25 May 1952 – 6 May 1961.
- Lincoln Junior League. An Architectural Album. Lincoln, Nebraska: 1979.
- Lincoln Star, 17 May 1945 – 22 February 1961.
- McAlester, Virginia and Lee McAlester. A Field Guide to American Houses. New York: Alfred A. Knopf, 1997.
- McAlester, Virginia and Lee McAlester. A Field Guide to America's Historic Neighborhoods and Museum Houses: The Western States. New York: Alfred A. Knopf, 1998.
- McKee, James L. Remember When ... Memories of Lincoln. Lincoln, Nebraska: J & L Lee Co., 1998.
- Nebraska State Journal, 20 June 1899.
- Omaha World-Herald, 13 May 1945 – 16 March 1958.
- Poeschl, Peg. "Housing Nebraska's Governors, 1854-1980." Nebraska History, Vol. 61, No. 3, Fall, 1980.
- Solheim, Selmer A. Business Papers, 1956–1967. Library/Archives Manuscript Collections. Nebraska State Historical Society, Lincoln, Nebraska.
