= National primary =

Proposed system for US presidential elections

A national primary is a proposed system for conducting the United States presidential primaries and caucuses, such that all occur on the same day (not currently the case).

== Early attempts ==
The first bill for a national primary was introduced in Congress by Representative Richard Hobson of Alabama in 1911. President Woodrow Wilson endorsed the concept. Since that time 125 similar bills have been introduced. Support was strong in 1913 with the Senate discussing the plan for an hour and deciding that there was general support for President Wilson's reforms. In 1915, Senator Atlee Pomerene of Ohio, chairman of the sub-committee examining President Wilson's plan, came to the conclusion that an amendment to the Constitution was needed before such a national primary could occur.

== Super Tuesday ==
Super Tuesday events—days where large numbers of states hold their primaries—have been scheduled in February or March of elections dating back to 1984. There were three Super Tuesday events in 1984. Nine southern states turned the 1988 event into a major regional contest. Twenty-four states participated in 2008, the most states to have done so in the history of Super Tuesdays.

== Justification ==
The system of staggered primaries means that voters in later primaries may find that the nominee has already been selected before they vote. (For instance, New York, the third-largest state, voted after the nominees had been selected in both parties in both 2000 and 2004.) Disproportionate power is given to the earliest primaries, with candidates who lose them being considered non-viable, even if they may have a lot of support in larger states.

== Criticisms ==
The major flaw in the concept is that it takes the phenomenon of frontloading, which other reform plans seek to alleviate, to its ultimate conclusion. Candidates would need to raise huge sums of money, before the first vote was cast in any state, in order to wage a nationwide campaign. Neither the Republican National Committee's 2000 Advisory Commission on the Presidential Nominating Process nor the Democratic National Committee's 2005 Commission on Presidential Nomination Timing and Scheduling considered a national primary as a reform concept; rather they considered it the consequence of inadequate action to reform the process.

According to Senator Spencer Abraham, "the trend of frontloading, which will, in the not too distant future, produce a single national primary day is a disturbing trend that needs attention. To have the selection process essentially come down to a single day of dozens of primaries ensures little to no deliberation on this extremely important decision. It would result in minimal give-and-take on issues such that the succeeding candidate would not be the product of a thoughtful issue discussion."

Former Oklahoma Governor Frank Keating said, "I also concur fully in the Commission's belief that a national primary would not be a welcome replacement for the current system, since it would create as many problems as it might solve."

According to Terry Shumaker in the Transcript of the Commission on Presidential Nomination Timing and Scheduling, "we need to preserve the possibility for lesser known, lesser funded candidates to compete, and a national primary on February 5th will not do that."

== Link ==
National Presidential Primary Homepage

== See also ==
- United States presidential primary
- United States presidential election
- United States presidential election debates
- American presidential debate
- United States presidential nominating convention
- United States Electoral College

Early Votes

- Ames (Iowa) Straw Poll on a Saturday in August prior to the election year, since 1979
- Iowa caucus first official election year event since 1972
- New Hampshire primary first national primary stop since 1952

Reform Plans

- United States presidential primary reform proposals
- Graduated Random Presidential Primary System
- Delaware Plan
- Rotating Regional Primary System
- Interregional Primary Plan
