= Thomas Gangale =

- Born: May 13, 1954; San Francisco, California
- Occupations: aerospace engineer, political scientist, space jurist
- Known for: Solar quasi-satellite for Mars communications, alliance theory, Darian calendar

Thomas Gangale (born 13 May 1954) is an American aerospace engineer, political scientist, space jurist, space historian, author, and researcher known for his contributions to the conceptualization of a calendar for Mars (the Darian calendar), international space law, proposals for reforming the U.S. presidential nomination process, studies on human Mars mission and communication architectures, human spaceflight scheduling, Martian geography projects, and related interdisciplinary topics.

== Education and Career ==
Thomas Gangale was born on May 13, 1954 in San Francisco, California. He graduated from George Washington High School in 1972. He attended the College of San Mateo from 1972 to 1974 before enlisting in the United States Air Force, where he served as an air traffic controller at England Air Force Base in Alexandria, Louisiana. He separated from active duty in 1975 to attend the University of Southern California (USC), earning a Bachelor of Science degree in aerospace engineering.

Upon graduation from USC, Gangale declined an offer to join the Jet Propulsion Laboratory's Voyager mission control team due to his prior commitment to active duty service in the United States Air Force. During his military career (1970s–1990), he served as a commissioned officer in roles including F-4 Phantom weapon systems officer and historian for the 56th Tactical Fighter Wing. While stationed at Lockheed Missiles and Space Company in Sunnyvale, California (1981--1987), he managed technical and contractual aspects of reconnaissance satellite systems (such as Gambit and Hexagon) and payloads for Space Shuttle missions STS-4 and STS-39. Later, he was assigned to the Boost Surveillance and Tracking System program office at Los Angeles Air Force Base.

After leaving the Air Force in 1990, he worked for several small companies in the San Francisco Bay Area as a systems analyst. He earned a Master of Arts degree in international relations from San Francisco State University in 2006, with a thesis on “International Legal Issues of Sovereignty and Property Rights in Outer Space.”

Gangale completed a Doctor of Juridical Sciences (JSD or SJD) degree in space, cyber, and telecommunications law at the University of Nebraska College of Law (University of Nebraska–Lincoln) in 2017. His dissertation addressed “The Definition and Delimitation of Outer Space and Territorial Airspace in International Law.” Gangale's opinion editorials have appeared in the Philadelphia Inquirer, San Francisco Chronicle, San Francisco Examiner, and Marin Independent Journal. He has presented at conferences including those of the American Institute of Aeronautics and Astronautics (AIAA) and the Society of Automotive Engineers (SAE), and has appeared in media discussions on space and political topics. Gangale is a member of the AIAA. Many of his works were coauthored with Marilyn Dudley-Rowley.

== Darian calendar ==
Gangale developed the Darian calendar in 1985, a proposed calendar system for Mars named after his son Darius. First published in 1986, it divides the Martian solar day (sol) and year into weeks and months adapted to Mars's orbital period of approximately 687 Earth days (668.59 sols per vernal equinox year). Key features include 24 months (mostly 28 sols, with periodic 27-sol months for synchronization), a nominal seven-sol week (with six-sol weeks at month ends to align starts), leap year rules, and intercalation formulas to maintain alignment with the vernal equinox over millennia as the Martian year lengthens slightly.

The calendar's epoch is the Telescopic Epoch, originally proposed by others and adopted by Gangale in 2002, set to the Martian vernal equinox corresponding to March 11, 1609 (Earth Gregorian). This recognizes Johannes Kepler's publication of his first two laws of planetary motion (using Tycho Brahe's Mars observations) and Galileo Galilei's first telescopic observations of Mars in 1609–1610, marking the start of the telescopic era in Mars study. This epoch allows all historical telescopic observations of Mars to be expressed in non-negative Darian dates. Earlier versions used a 1975–1976 epoch tied to the Viking program's successful Mars landings. The calendar has been presented at Mars Society conventions (e.g., 1998 founding) and discussed in contexts of future Mars colonization, with adaptations (e.g., for Galilean moons of Jupiter in 1998) and cultural expansions (including East Asian variants).

== Space exploration and architecture contributions ==
Gangale drew the first computer-aided design drawings for the Flashline Mars Arctic Research Station, a Mars Society project on Devon Island in the Canadian Arctic that served as a prototype for human Mars exploration habitats. He has contributed to concepts for assured communication with Mars, including the MarsSat quasi-satellite architecture for continuous relay links. This design overcomes line-of-sight limitations caused by Mars' orbital geometry and solar conjunctions, when the Sun blocks direct radio communication between Earth and Mars for up to several weeks.

Gangale has also published on modifications to NASA's Mars Design Reference Architecture, including payload trades and options for early crew return. In addition, he has developed "time maps" of human spaceflight—two-dimensional visualizations that extend traditional Gantt charts by incorporating historical and projected timelines. These maps illustrate schedule evolution, credibility, and slippages across programs such as Mercury, Gemini, Apollo, Dyna-Soar, and Manned Orbiting Laboratory, with detailed examples covering periods such as 1956–1967 that reveal broader trends in project management and planning dynamics.

=== Mitigation of the Third Quarter Phenomenon via MarsSat ===
Gangale's MarsSat concept directly addresses a critical psychosocial risk in conjunction-class human missions to Mars. During the midpoint of such missions—roughly the "third quarter" phase identified in research by Marilyn Dudley-Rowley—the crew experiences heightened stress, deviant behavior, and morale decline precisely when solar conjunction severs direct Earth contact for several weeks. By placing relay spacecraft in quasi-satellite solar orbits (co-periodic with Mars but slightly inclined and eccentric), MarsSat maintains continuous line-of-sight communications between Mars and Earth. This provides an unbroken emotional tether to mission control and family, preventing the communication blackout from exacerbating the Third Quarter Phenomenon and thereby enhancing crew health, safety, and performance during the most psychologically fraught segment of the journey.

=== Optimization of Mars mission architecture for reduced IMLEO ===
Gangale's broader Mars mission architecture further improves efficiency by taking maximum advantage of the 15- to 17-year meta-synodic cycle of Earth-Mars alignments. This long-term periodicity allows selection of optimal launch windows that minimize energy requirements for interplanetary transfers. By aligning trajectories with these recurring favorable geometries, the design achieves significant reductions in initial mass in low Earth orbit (IMLEO) compared to standard opposition- or conjunction-class profiles. The approach incorporates payload trades and early-return options, yielding lighter overall mission stacks, lower propellant demands, and greater flexibility for crewed expeditions while remaining compatible with existing launch vehicles and in-situ resource utilization strategies.

== Space law contributions ==
Gangale has contributed to international space law through analyses of orbital regimes, property rights, and governance frameworks for extraterrestrial activities.

=== Geostationary orbit and the Bogotá Declaration ===
In his 2006 article "Who Owns the Geostationary Orbit?", published in the Annals of Air and Space Law (Vol. 31), he critiques claims of national sovereignty over segments of the geostationary orbit (GSO) advanced in the 1976 Bogotá Declaration by equatorial states. Drawing on astrodynamics, analogies to terrestrial sovereignty claims, customary international law, and the language of the 1967 Outer Space Treaty, Gangale argues that the GSO forms part of outer space and is not subject to national appropriation. The paper refutes the Bogotá Declaration's assertion that the GSO is a distinct natural resource outside outer space, emphasizing that no treaty or UN resolution distinguishes the GSO from other orbits. This work has been referenced in subsequent scholarship on orbital governance and the legal status of geosynchronous positions.

=== The Kármán line ===
Gangale's work in space law critiques established concepts and advocates for frameworks supporting space activities. In "The Non Kármán Line: An Urban Legend of the Space Age" (Journal of Space Law, 2015/2016), he debunks the Kármán line—a notional boundary at approximately 100 km altitude often cited as the edge of space—as lacking scientific or legal basis, arguing it is an urban legend perpetuated without formal adoption in international law. This article, drawn from his doctoral research, challenges the arbitrary delimitation of outer space and territorial airspace, proposing alternative approaches based on functional, spatial, temporal, and hybrid criteria.

=== Resource appropriation and utilization ===
On extraterrestrial resource utilization, Gangale defends the legality of mining on the Moon and asteroids for profit under existing treaties. In "The Legality of Mining Celestial Bodies" (Journal of Space Law, Vol. 40, No. 1-2, 2017), he argues there is no moratorium on mining celestial bodies in international law, tracing historical statements and treaty interpretations to support commercial exploitation without national appropriation. He posits that the 1967 Outer Space Treaty allows resource use, including profitable extraction, as is later affirmed in the 2020 Artemis Accords. In publications such as "Myths of the Moon Agreement" (2008) and his book The Development of Outer Space: Sovereignty and Property Rights in International Space Law (2009), he argues for reviving the 1979 Moon Agreement to establish regulated regimes for resource exploitation, countering claims that it prohibits commercial mining. He critiques opposition to the Moon Agreement as rooted in misconceptions. Additional works like "Castles in the Air: Debunking the Space Settlement Prize" (2008) and "A Limited International Agreement on Property Rights" (2007) explore property rights models that enable commercial activities while preserving common heritage principles.

=== Heritage preservation ===
Gangale has proposed a Voluntary Lunar and Martian Heritage Protection Agreement as a practical, consensus-based framework to safeguard humanity's cultural and scientific heritage on the Moon and Mars. Published in 2026, the 28-page paper reviews the evolution of lunar heritage concepts and introduces operational guidelines derived from the Artemis Accords—including descent/landing keep-out zones, graduated surface buffers, and special protections for high-value traces—while fully respecting the Outer Space Treaty's principles of non-appropriation and free access. Designed as a lightweight, voluntary "soft law" instrument, the Agreement aims to address gaps in existing guidelines amid accelerating lunar commercialization and impending human missions to Mars. It emphasizes incremental commitments to build confidence and precedent for future extraterrestrial governance.

=== Martian governance ===
In 2026, Gangale drafted the Charter of the United Martian States, a proposed confederative constitutional framework for future human settlements on Mars. It envisions a voluntary union of sovereign city-states operating in a dispersed, high-risk frontier environment, emphasizing strict limits on central authority, absolute autonomy for member states in internal affairs (including governance, labor relations, and local resources), an unrestricted right of secession, and minimal enumerated Union powers focused on coordination for survival and defense. Grounded in the 1967 Outer Space Treaty, the Universal Declaration of Human Rights, and lessons from Earth's historical confederations and federations, the Charter rejects both unitary planetary government and strong federal models in favor of decentralized structures, including a capped defensive Martian Space Guard, direct democratic mechanisms at the Union level, and strong safeguards against tyranny such as judicial review and a high amendment threshold.

Accompanying the Charter is The Martian Federalist, a multi-series collection of essays by Gangale modeled after the original Federalist Papers. These essays—spanning practical design, theoretical issues, historical precedents, pathways to independence, social control in lethal environments, and moral architecture—explain and defend the Charter's provisions, address ratification challenges, and argue for a resilient political culture suited to Martian conditions.

The documents together propose a post-Westphalian, liberty-oriented governance model for Mars that prioritizes adaptability, voluntary cooperation, and the prevention of coercive centralization.

Gangale explores the philosophical and practical tensions between competing models of human settlement on Mars in his 2026 essay "Libertas and Harmony: A Clash of Anthropologies on the Martian Frontier". The paper contrasts two plausible early permanent outposts projected for the 2040s and 2050s: Libertas, a US-led consortium settlement rooted in the principles of the Charter of the United Martian States and The Martian Federalist series, which prioritizes individual sovereignty, dignity, consent, exit rights, and polycentric governance; and Harmony, a Sino-Russian centralized model that subordinates individual rights to collective mission goals, ideological cohesion, and top-down control. Gangale analyzes how these divergent anthropologies—viewing humans as sovereign moral agents versus mission assets—would shape economics, geopolitics, AI governance, genetic engineering, migration, and long-term societal resilience in Mars' lethal environment. Through parameterized projections to 2100, he argues that Libertas's rights-based, competitive, and open framework is likely to yield superior adaptability, innovation, population growth, and civilizational endurance, while acknowledging environmental and black-swan uncertainties. This work extends Gangale's broader scholarship on Martian governance, using the Red Planet as a "natural laboratory" to test whether liberty constitutes a luxury or a fundamental multiplier for multi-planetary human flourishing.

== Martian geography projects ==
Gangale has initiated comprehensive projects on Martian nomenclature and mapping. The Encyclopedia of Martian Geography is a detailed reference (over 1,100 pages) reviving and cataloging classical albedo features—historical names for Martian surface regions observed telescopically before spacecraft imagery—alongside modern IAU-approved toponyms. It integrates historical, cultural, and scientific contexts for Martian place names, aiming to preserve astronomical heritage while supporting future exploration.

Complementing this is the Atlas of Martian Geography, a high-resolution visual companion providing maps, imagery, and annotations of Martian features. Both projects, developed to bridge classical and contemporary Martian studies, were set for digital launch in early 2026, with initial elements uploaded to platforms like ResearchGate, Academia.edu, and Zenodo. They draw on Gangale's prior work in Martian timekeeping and astrosociology, emphasizing cultural and practical aspects for potential human settlement.

== Electoral reform ==
Gangale authored the American Plan (the name adopted by FairVote, but formally known as the Graduated Random Presidential Primary System), a proposal to reform the U.S. presidential nomination process by addressing front-loading in primaries. It features a semi-randomized schedule starting with smaller states to promote merit-based early competition and broader candidate participation. The plan has received support from the California Democratic Party and recommendations for consideration by the Democratic National Committee. He has written on this in From the Primaries to the Polls: How to Repair America's Broken Presidential Nomination Process (2007).

== International relations theory ==
Gangale has also contributed to realist theories of alliance formation. In his 2003 paper "Alliance Theory: Balancing, Bandwagoning, and Détente" (San Francisco State University), he analyzes Stephen M. Walt's balance-of-threat theory, distinguishing it from Kenneth Waltz's balance-of-power and contrasting it with Randall Schweller's balance-of-interests approach. The work clarifies behavioral distinctions, particularly between bandwagoning (asymmetrical, often coerced alignment) and détente (mutual, voluntary tension reduction). It has been referenced in studies on Persian Gulf alliances, NATO evolution, and threat perception in regional conflicts.

Gangale argues in his 2026 paper "Westphalia's End: The Outer Space Treaty, Non-Territorial Sovereignty, and the Structural Pacification of War in a Multi-Planetary System" that the 1967 Outer Space Treaty fundamentally disrupts traditional Westphalian assumptions of international relations. Drawing on realist theory (Waltz, Mearsheimer), historical institutionalism (Tilly, Spruyt), and democratic peace theory (Doyle), Gangale contends that the Treaty’s prohibition on national appropriation—combined with the lethal, non-contiguous environment of Mars—renders territorial sovereignty impossible and instead selects for non-territorial city-states exercising functional jurisdiction over personnel, objects, and localized operations. Safety and deconfliction zones (as operationalized in the Artemis Accords) serve as lawful, activity-based delimitations rather than territorial claims. These norms evolve into the constitutional framework of the Charter of the United Martian States, institutionalizing enumerated powers, rights protections, and minimal defense structures that suppress the security dilemma through mutual vulnerability, transparency, and legal firewalls. Gangale presents Mars as a “natural laboratory” where outer space law acts as an independent variable, transforming systemic anarchy into a pacified, republican order and compelling terrestrial IR theory to reconsider its Westphalian contingencies. This work builds directly on his ongoing scholarship in The Martian Federalist series and interplanetary federalism.

== Selected works ==
- Gangale, Thomas (2026). "Westphalia's End: The Outer Space Treaty, Non-Territorial Sovereignty, and the Structural Pacification of War in a Multi-Planetary System".
- Gangale, Thomas (2026). "Libertas and Harmony: A Clash of Anthropologies on the Martian Frontier".
- Gangale, Thomas (2026). "The Charter of the United Martian States and The Martian Federalist: A Proposed Constitution for the Future Settlements on Mars".
- Gangale, Thomas (2026). Encyclopedia of Martian Geography, Volume 3.
- Gangale, Thomas (2026). Encyclopedia of Martian Geography, Volume 2.
- Gangale, Thomas (2026). Encyclopedia of Martian Geography, Volume 1.
- Gangale, Thomas (2019). Space Exploration in the United States: A Documentary History. Bloomsbury Publishing USA. ISBN 978-1-4408-7165-8.
- Gangale, Thomas (2017). "The Non Kármán Line: An Urban Legend of the Space Age" (PDF). Journal of Space Law. 41 (2): 151–177.
- Gangale, Thomas (2018). How High the Sky?: The Definition and Delimitation of Outer Space and Territorial Airspace in International Law. Leiden, The Netherlands: Brill Nijhoff.
- Gangale, Thomas (2018). "Mars Design Reference Architecture Modifications: Payload Trades and Early Return Options". Proceedings of the AIAA Space 2018 Conference. Orlando, Florida: American Institute of Aeronautics and Astronautics.
- Gangale, Thomas (2018). Time Maps of Human Spaceflight: 1962-1964. AIAA SPACE and Astronautics Forum (SPACE 2018). Orlando, Florida: American Institute of Aeronautics and Astronautics.
- Gangale, Thomas (2018). Time Maps of Human Spaceflight: 1965-1967. AIAA SPACE and Astronautics Forum (SPACE 2018). Orlando, Florida: American Institute of Aeronautics and Astronautics.
- Gangale, Thomas (2017). "The Legality of Mining Celestial Bodies". Journal of Space Law. 40 (1–2): 187.
- Gangale, Thomas (2009). The Development of Outer Space: Sovereignty and Property Rights in International Space Law. Bloomsbury Publishing USA. ISBN 978-0-313-37824-9.
- Gangale, Thomas (2009). Time Maps of Human Spaceflight: 1956-1958. AIAA SPACE 2009 Conference & Exposition. San Diego, California: American Institute of Aeronautics and Astronautics. doi:10.2514/6.2009-6411.
- Gangale, Thomas (2009). Time Maps of Human Spaceflight: 1959-1961. AIAA SPACE 2009 Conference & Exposition. San Diego, California: American Institute of Aeronautics and Astronautics. doi:10.2514/6.2009-6412.
- Gangale, Thomas (2008). Myths of the Moon Agreement. AIAA SPACE 2008 Conference and Exposition. San Diego, California. doi:10.2514/6.2008-7715.
- Gangale, Thomas (2008). Castles in the Air: Debunking the Space Settlement Prize. 46th AIAA Aerospace Sciences Meeting and Exhibit. Reno, Nevada. doi:10.2514/6.2008-1466.
- Byford, Dorrie; Goppert, James; Gangale, Thomas (2008). "Optimal Location of Relay Satellites for Continuous Communication with Mars". Proceedings of the AIAA Space 2008 Conference. San Diego, California: American Institute of Aeronautics and Astronautics.
- Gangale, Thomas (2007). From the Primaries to the Polls: How to Repair America's Broken Presidential Nomination Process. Bloomsbury Publishing USA. ISBN 978-0-313-34836-5.
- Gangale, Thomas (2007). A Limited International Agreement on Property Rights. AIAA SPACE 2007 Conference & Exposition. Long Beach, California. doi:10.2514/6.2007-6072.
- Gangale, Thomas (2007). The Architecture of Time, Part 3: Project Management in Two-Dimensional Time. AIAA SPACE 2007 Conference & Exposition. Long Beach, California: American Institute of Aeronautics and Astronautics. doi:10.2514/6.2007-6073.
- Gangale, Thomas (2006). The Architecture of Time, Part 2: The Darian System for Mars. San Diego, California: Society of Automotive Engineers.
- Gangale, Thomas (2006). "Who Owns the Geostationary Orbit?" (PDF). Annals of Air and Space Law. 31.
- Gangale, T. (2005). "MarsSat: Assured Communication with Mars". Annals of the New York Academy of Sciences. 1065: 296–310. Bibcode:2005NYASA1065..296G. doi:10.1196/annals.1370.007. PMID 16510416.
- Gangale, Thomas (2003). "Alliance Theory: Balancing, Bandwagoning, and Détente" (Term paper / Unpublished manuscript). San Francisco State University, International Relations 720.
- Gangale, Thomas; Dudley-Rowley, Marilyn (2003). "The Architecture of Time: Design Implications for Extended Space Missions". SAE Transactions: Journal of Aerospace (2004). 113: 1219–1231. JSTOR 44737989.
