= Wayne Swanson =

American politician (1914–2003)

33rd Nebraska State Treasurer
- In office Contested: January 5, 1967 – January 27, 1967; January 5, 1967 – January 9, 1975
- Preceded by: Fred Sorensen
- Succeeded by: Frank Marsh

Member of the Nebraska Railway Commission
- In office January 3, 1957 – January 27, 1967
- Preceded by: Paul Pettygrove
- Succeeded by: Robert T. Marland

Personal details
- Born: December 31, 1914 Omaha, Nebraska
- Died: May 9, 2003 (aged 88) Lincoln, Nebraska
- Party: Republican
- Spouse: Ruth McDonald (m. 1946)
- Children: 2
- Occupation: Businessman

Wayne R. Swanson (December 31, 1914 – May 9, 2003) was a Republican politician from Nebraska who served as Nebraska State Treasurer from 1967 to 1975 and as a member of the Nebraska Railway Commission from 1957 to 1967.

== Early life ==
Swanson was born in Omaha, Nebraska, and was the son of Nebraska Commissioner of Public Lands and Buildings Leo Swanson, the last person elected to the position before it was abolished. Swanson graduated from Omaha Technical High School, and served in World War II. After returning from the war, he earned his plumber's license and worked as a plumber.

== Nebraska Railway Commission ==
In 1956, Swanson ran for the Nebraska Railway Commission, challenging appointed Commissioner Paul Pettygrove in the Republican primary. He was joined in the primary by former State Senator Charles Vogt, Omaha City Commissioner William Milner, and factory representative Fred Sorensen. Despite being referred to as a "political unknown[]" by newspapers, Swanson narrowly won the Republican primary, receiving 27 percent of the vote to Sorensen's 25 percent, while Pettygrove came in fifth place with 13 percent. The Omaha World-Herald attributed Swanson's victory, and Sorensen's strong performance, to the "vote-getting power of Scandinavian names," and several newspaper suggested that, in a low-turnout election, voters may have confused Swanson with former Railway Commissioner Duane T. Swanson. In the general election, Swanson faced Democratic nominee J. C. McReynolds, an attorney and perennial candidate for the commission. Swanson defeated him by a wide margin, winning 59 percent of the vote to McReynolds's 41 percent.

Swanson ran for re-election in 1962. He was challenged in the Republican primary by real estate broker Raymond Lemke, retired railroad superintendent E. E. Cooper, and salesman Waldo Iverson. He won re-election by a wide margin, winning 57 percent of the vote. In the general election, Swanson was challenged by Democratic nominee Fred Sorensen, whom he had narrowly defeated in the 1956 Republican primary. He defeated Sorensen by a narrow margin, winning re-election 53–47 percent.

== Nebraska State Treasurer ==
In 1965, Swanson announced that he would run for State Treasurer in 1966, challenging the Democratic incumbent, Fred Sorensen, for re-election. In the Republican primary, he faced fellow Railway Commissioner Richard H. Larson and retired postal employee Herman C. Christensen. Swanson narrowly won the primary, receiving 43 percent of the vote to Larson's 39 percent, and advanced to the general election against Sorensen. Swanson defeated Sorensen in a landslide, winning 59–41 percent.

Sorensen challenged Swanson's ability to hold the office, however, arguing that Swanson was constitutionally barred from seeking or holding any other constitutional office while he was a member of the Railway Commission. Swanson was sworn into the office on January 5, 1967, but Sorensen declined to vacate the physical office while his contest was pending. Swanson sought a writ of quo warranto from the Supreme Court of Nebraska, seeking to have Sorensen removed from office. The court ultimately ruled in Swanson's favor on January 27, 1967, and Sorensen left the office "under protest," pledging to continue his contest. Swanson subsequently resigned from the Railway Commission.

Swanson ran for re-election in 1970, and was challenged in the Republican primary by Eldred Larson, a member of the Nebraska Republican Party's State Central Committee and a Northwestern Bell employee. The Lincoln Evening Journal endorsed Larson over Swanson, criticizing Swanson for being "a bottleneck in efforts to modernize state accounting and disbursing procedures through the use of computers." Swanson defeated Larson in a landslide, winning renomination with 70 percent of the vote. In the general election, Swanson was challenged by John Kissack, a businessman who owned an office equipment supply company. Kissack argued that Swanson was a "political accident" who was unable to competently run the office. Swanson defeated Kissack in a landslide, winning 57 percent of the vote to Kissack's 43 percent.

== Subsequent campaigns ==
In 1974, Swanson was constitutionally barred from seeking re-election as Treasurer, and instead ran for a seat on the Public Service Commission from the 5th district, challenging incumbent Commissioner John Swanson. However, Swanson lost the Republican primary to former State Senator Jack Romans, winning just 16 percent of the vote to Romans's 30 percent. After leaving office, Swanson resumed working as a plumber, but in 1979, suffered a spinal fracture, and he retired.

Swanson ran for Lancaster County Treasurer in 1978, facing glass cutter Richard Nuernberger, the son of County Engineer Marvin Nuernberger, in the Republican primary. Nuernberger defeated Swanson by a wide margin, receiving 57 percent of the vote to Swanson's 43 percent.

In 1981, Swanson announced that he would run for State Treasurer in 1982. He challenged incumbent Kay A. Orr, who had been appointed to the post by Governor Charles Thone in 1981, in the Republican primary, along with State Senator Shirley Marsh and Kurt Rasmussen. Orr won renomination by a wide margin, receiving 47 percent of the vote to Marsh's 31 percent, Swanson's 12 percent, and Rasmussen's 10 percent.

== Death ==
Swanson died on May 9, 2003, in Lincoln, Nebraska.
