= National Association of Secretaries of State =

U.S. non-partisan professional organization

- Abbreviation: NASS
- Founded: 1904; 122 years ago
- Type: 501(c)(3)
- Tax ID no.: 61-1332655
- Legal status: Professional nonprofit organization
- Headquarters: Washington, D.C., U.S.
- Coordinates: 38.895777°N 77.009186°W
- Executive director: Leslie Reynolds
- President: Tahesha Way
- Revenue: $1,107,581 (2018)
- Expenses: $992,261 (2018)
- Employees: 6 (2017)
- Website: www.nass.org

The National Association of Secretaries of State (NASS), founded in 1904, is the oldest non-partisan professional organization of public officials in the United States, composed of the secretaries of state of U.S. states and territories. Currently, all secretaries of state, including Washington D.C., Puerto Rico, the U.S. Virgin Islands, and Guam are members of NASS.

NASS maintains its office in Washington, D.C., and promotes positions on issues of interest to secretaries of state: voter turnout, voting procedures, business services, electronic government, securities, and government archives.

Pennsylvania secretary of the commonwealth Pedro A. Cortés became the first Puerto Rican president of the organization, and the last one to hold the position for a full one-year term, followed by Maine secretary of state Matthew Dunlap, whose term was cut short by his electoral defeat in the 2010 midterm elections. Minnesota secretary of state Mark Ritchie filled the remainder of Dunlap's term. During the organization's annual summer meeting in San Juan in July 2012, Alabama secretary of state Beth Chapman turned over the presidency to Nevada secretary of state Ross Miller.

== Positions of NASS ==
NASS has taken a stand on the issue of the United States presidential primaries, promoting the Rotating Regional Primary System.

NASS has called on the National Institute of Standards and Technology and the U.S. Election Assistance Commission to publish a plain English guide to the new Voluntary Voting System Guidelines.

NASS has also published a position paper on federal legislation, calling on the Congress to respect states rights.

== NASS presidents ==
- Scott Schwab, Kansas (2023-Present)
- Tahesha Way, New Jersey (2022–2023)
- Maggie Toulouse Oliver, New Mexico (2020–2021)
- Paul Pate, Iowa (2019–2020)
- Jim Condos, Vermont (2018–2019)
- Connie Lawson, Indiana (2017–2018)
- Denise Merrill, Connecticut (2016–2017)
- Elaine Marshall, North Carolina (2015)
- Kate Brown, Oregon (2014–February 2015)
- Tre Hargett, Tennessee (2013–2014)
- Ross Miller, Nevada (2012–2013)
- Beth Chapman, Alabama (2011–2012)
- Mark Ritchie, Minnesota (2011)
- Matthew Dunlap, Maine (2010–January 2011)
- Trey Grayson, Kentucky (2009–2010)
- Pedro Cortés, Pennsylvania (2008–2009)
- Todd Rokita, Indiana (2007–2008)
- Deb Markowitz, Vermont (2006–2007)
- Sam Reed, Washington (August 2005–2006)
- Donetta Davidson, Colorado (July 2005–August 2005)
- Rebecca Vigil-Giron, New Mexico (2004–2005)
- Mary Kiffmeyer, Minnesota (2003–2004)
- Dan Gwadosky, Maine (2002–2003)
- Ron Thornburgh, Kansas (2001–2002)
- Sharon Priest, Arkansas (2000–2001)
- Jim Bennett, Alabama (1999–2000)
- Bill Gardner, New Hampshire (1998–1999)
- Olene Walker, Utah (1997–1998)
- Mike Cooney, Montana (1996–1997)
- Joyce Hazeltine, South Dakota (1995–1996)
- Rufus Edmisten, North Carolina (1994–1995)
- Natalie Meyer, Colorado (1993–1994)
- Gail Shafer, New York (1992–1993)
- Dick Molpus, Mississippi (1991–1992)
- Ralph Munro, Washington (1990–1991)
- Julia Tashjian, Connecticut (1989–1990)
- Jim Edgar, Illinois (1988–1989)
- Jim Waltermire, Montana (1987) (Note: Died in office)
- James H. Douglas, Vermont (1986–1987)
- Jeanette B. Edmondson, Oklahoma (1985–1986)
- Edwin J. Simcox, Indiana (1984–1985)
- Jack H. Brier, Kansas (1983–1984)
- Rose Mofford, Arizona (1982–1983)
- Robert Burns, Rhode Island (1981–1982)
- Gentry Crowell, Tennessee (1980–1981)
- Joan Anderson Growe, Minnesota (1979–1980)
- Alan J. Dixon, Illinois (1978–1979)
- Fred L. Wineland, Maryland (1977–1978)
- Mark White, Texas (1977)
- Allen J. Beermann, Nebraska (1976–1977)
- Elwill Shanahan, Kansas (1975–1976)
- Clyde L. Miller, Utah (1974–1975)
- James C. Kirkpatrick, Missouri (1973–1974)
- Byron A. Anderson, Colorado (1972–1973)
- Kelly Bryant, Arkansas (1971–1972)
- John P. Lomenzo, New York (1970–1971)
- August P. LaFrance, Rhode Island (1969–1970)
- Frank Murray, Montana (1968–1969)
- Joseph Donovan, Minnesota (1967–1968)
- Ben Miller, North Dakota (1966–1967)
- Martha Bell Conway, Virginia (1965–1966)
- Joe C. Carr, Tennessee (1964–1965)
- Lamont F. Toronto, Utah (1963–1964)
- Frank Marsh, Nebraska (1962–1963)
- Ted W. Brown, Ohio (1961–1962)
- Melvin D. Synhorst, Iowa (1960–1961)
- Oscar Frank Thornton, South Carolina (1959–1960)
- Paul R. Shanahan, Kansas (1957–1958)
- John Koontz, Nevada (1958–1959)
- Howard E. Armstrong, Vermont (1956–1957)
- Ben W. Fortson, Jr., Georgia (1954–1955)
- Heber Ladner, Mississippi (1955–1956)
- Earl T. Newbry, Oregon (1953–1954)
- Wesley Bolin, Arizona (1952–1953)
- C.G. Hall, Arkansas (1951–1952)
- Armand H. Cote, Rhode Island (1950–1951)
- Frank Marsh, Nebraska (1949–1950)
- Frank M. Jordan, California (1948–1949)
- Wade O. Martin, Jr., Louisiana (1947–1948)
- Robert S. Farrell, Jr., Oregon (1946–1947)
- Walker Wood, Mississippi (1945–1946)
- Mike Holm, Minnesota (1944–1945)
- Frederic W. Cook, Massachusetts (1943–1944)
- Edward J. Hughes, Illinois (1942–1943)
- Thad Eure, North Carolina (1941–1942)
- E.E. Monson, Utah (1940–1941)
- John B. Wilson, Georgia (1938–1940)
- Dwight H. Brown, Missouri (1937–1938)
- Theodore Dammann, Wisconsin (1936–1937)
- Robert A. Gray, Florida (1935–1936)
- Enoch D. Fuller, New Hampshire (1934–1935)
- Robert Byrne, North Dakota (1933–1934)
- Ernest N. Haston, Tennessee (1931–1933)
- Ernest L. Sprague, Rhode Island (1930–1931)
- W.P. Blackwell, South Carolina (1929–1930)
- Fred E. Lukens, Idaho (1927–1929)
- J. Grant Hinkle, Washington (1926–1927)
- Mike Holm, Minnesota (1924–1926)
- Frederic W. Cook, Massachusetts (1923–1924)
- Louis L. Emmerson, Illinois (1920–1923)
- Albert P. Langtry, Massachusetts (1917–1920)
- Stuart F. Reed, West Virginia (1915–1917)

== Annual summer meetings ==
NASS holds its annual winter meeting in Washington DC, usually during the month of February. Its summer meeting, usually held during the month of July, is rotated throughout the member states and territories. Venues have included the following.

- Anchorage, Alaska – 2013
- San Juan, Puerto Rico – 2012 hosted by Kenneth McClintock
- Daniels, West Virginia – 2011 hosted by Natalie Tennant
- Providence, Rhode Island – 2010 hosted by Ralph Mollis
- Minneapolis, Minnesota – 2009 hosted by Mark Ritchie

== See also ==
- Secretary of State (U.S. state government)
- Rotating Regional Primary System
