= Dawn Rockey =

American politician (born 1961)

Dawn E. Rockey

36th Nebraska State Treasurer
- In office January 9, 1991 – January 5, 1995
- Preceded by: Frank Marsh
- Succeeded by: Dave Heineman

Personal details
- Born: November 12, 1961 (age 64) Des Moines, Iowa
- Party: Democratic
- Spouse: D. Brian Rockey
- Education: University of Nebraska–Lincoln (B.A.)

Dawn E. Rockey (born November 12, 1961) is a Democratic politician from the state of Nebraska who served as the Nebraska State Treasurer from 1991 to 1995. She was elected in 1994, defeating incumbent Treasurer Frank Marsh, and was defeated by Dave Heineman in 1994 when she sought re-election to a second term.

== Early career ==
Rockey was born in Des Moines, Iowa, and graduated from Minden High School in 1980. She attended the University of Nebraska–Lincoln, where she graduated with her bachelor's degree in international relations in 1984. Rockey served in the Governor's Policy Research office as a research analyst, and worked as the legislative aide to State Senator Jerry Miller and as an administrative aide to State Senator Ron Withem.

== Nebraska State Treasurer ==
In 1990, Rockey filed to challenge Republican State Treasurer Frank Marsh for re-election, and won the Democratic nomination unopposed. Marsh started the campaign as the strong favorite, but during the campaign, Rockey uncovered that Marsh had made personal phone calls that were charged to the state, which ultimately totaled $2,000.

On October 22, 1990, several weeks before the election, Marsh was criminally charged with felony theft by deception for the personal phone calls. Rockey ultimately defeated Marsh in a landslide, winning 65 percent of the vote to his 35 percent, becoming the first Democrat to serve as treasurer since 1961, and the youngest statewide elected official since Marsh himself was elected Secretary of State in 1952.

In 1994, Rockey ran for re-election. She was challenged by Fremont City Councilman Dave Heineman, the Republican nominee. During the campaign, Heineman pledged to oppose new taxes and to scrutinize new government spending, and set a fundraising record for a candidate for State Treasurer. Rockey was ultimately defeated by Heineman, winning 46 percent of the vote to Heineman's 54 percent.
