= Interregional Primary Plan =

United States proposed political reform

The Interregional Primary Plan is a proposed reform to the United States primary calendar supported by Representative Sandy Levin and Senator Bill Nelson, both Democrats. The plan would break the country into six regions. From those regions, one subregion - either a single state or a group of smaller states - would vote on each primary date (e.g., all A states,) with the entire country having held its primaries after the sixth set of primaries votes. Each state would vote first once every twenty-four years, with the first set of primaries determined by lottery and cycled thereafter.

Historically, the presidential primary season started slowly, ramping up several weeks after the Iowa caucuses and the New Hampshire primary. In the 2008 Presidential primary season, with competition to increase the relevance of each state's selection process, 34 states (plus the District of Columbia), have scheduled their primary or caucus process to be held in January and February, tripling the number of states voting this early than the count in the 2000 races.

== Proposed dates ==
- 1st Primaries: Second Tuesday in March
- 2nd Primaries: First Tuesday in April
- 3rd Primaries: Fourth Tuesday in April
- 4th Primaries: Second Tuesday in May
- 5th Primaries: Fourth Tuesday in May
- 6th Primaries: Second Tuesday in June

== Proposed Regions ==
Region	Group A	Group B	Group C	Group D	Group E	Group F
1	Maine; New Hampshire; Vermont	Massachusetts	Connecticut; Rhode Island	Delaware; New Jersey	New York	Pennsylvania
2	Maryland	West Virginia	Missouri	Indiana	Kentucky	Tennessee
3	Ohio	Illinois	Michigan	Wisconsin	Iowa	Minnesota
4	Texas	Louisiana	Arkansas; Oklahoma	Colorado	Kansas; Nebraska	Arizona; New Mexico
5	Virginia	North Carolina	South Carolina	Florida	Georgia	Mississippi; Alabama
6	California	Washington	Oregon	Idaho; Nevada; Utah	Montana; North Dakota; South Dakota; Wyoming	Hawaii; Alaska

== Criticisms ==
=== Travel time ===
The interregional plan would prevent any cost savings from travel or common media markets. Each primary date would be national in geographic scope. This is directly counter to the goal of many plans is to allow for entry of less-funded candidates early on.

=== Varying primary size ===
With random assignment to groups within each region, any given primary date could be as small as 29 congressional districts, or as large as 167 (out of 435) districts (if the random draw were to pick CA, TX, NY, FL, IL, and PA together).

With this variation in size comes a variation in importance. If a medium-sized state like Maryland (8 districts) were paired up with California in a 130-district primary, the state would have little importance. If, on the other hand, it were paired up with smaller states in a 45-district primary, Maryland would suddenly be center-stage.

With some rigging, the six primaries can be set to between 70 and 79 districts each, but again whoever gets paired with California is largely ignored.

== See also ==
- United States presidential primary
- United States presidential election
- United States presidential election debates
- American presidential debate
- United States presidential nominating convention
- United States Electoral College

Early Votes

- Ames (Iowa) Straw Poll on a Saturday in August prior to the election year, since 1979
- Iowa caucus first official election year event since 1972
- New Hampshire primary first national primary stop since 1952

Reform Plans

- United States presidential primary reform proposals
- Graduated Random Presidential Primary System
- Rotating Regional Primary System
- Delaware Plan
- National Primary
