= Delaware Plan =

Proposed system for US presidential primary elections

Map of the Delaware Plan: 1st round 2nd round 3rd round 4th round

The Delaware Plan is a proposed system to reorganize the state presidential primary elections amongst the 50 states and the several territories of the United States. In brief, the Plan divides the states and territories into four groups, and has the territories and smallest states voting first and the largest states voting last.

== The plan ==
The Delaware Plan is an attempt to provide states with meaningful input into the electoral process. The states and territories are divided into four groups, by population. The smallest 12 states and all the territories by population would be the first group, or "pod". The smallest thirteen of the remaining states would be the second group, the next thirteen the third group, and the largest twelve states would form the final group.

The first group, consisting of the smallest states, would vote on one day in March. Though small, they would clearly play a major role in providing momentum to successful candidates. And, as small states, a candidate with limited resources might well find it easier to run the type of door-to-door campaign traditionally run in New Hampshire. However, unlike the current system, it would be difficult for a campaign without large resources to run in all states, as these small states are as widely spread (from Delaware to Alaska) as any in the nation.

The second and third groups would vote on a single day in April and May, respectively. The meaningfulness of their role in the process is secured by the fact that no candidate will be able to achieve a majority of delegates even by the end of the third group's vote in May. Every delegate won will be attached to a candidate that is guaranteed to still be "in the running".

The fourth group, that of the largest states, vote on a single day in June. These twelve states, though needing to wait to vote last, will nonetheless determine the winner, as between them they control more than 50% of the delegates to the national conventions. (Thus, even a last minute entry into the campaign could theoretically win the nomination even if they only ran at the end.) By voting together as a bloc, none of the large states is rendered irrelevant (as was the case for California from 1976 to 2000, after which California moved its voting up to an earlier date).

== Origins ==
Since 1952, New Hampshire has held the first state primary election in the presidential process, and since 1972, Iowa has held the first caucuses in the presidential nominating process. Other states followed in nearly random order, as determined by the individual state legislatures. Originally, the New Hampshire primary was held in mid-March of the election year, and the Iowa caucuses a week or two earlier. The final primary elections would typically be held the first or second Tuesday in June, completing the initial stage of the election process about five weeks before the first presidential nominating convention.

For decades, this was considered a desirable system. Having two small states "lead off" the campaign made it easier for candidates—particularly those with limited resources—to get their campaigns started. It was common for candidates to spend many months in New Hampshire in the year prior to the primary, in the hopes of building momentum by winning the first primary.

But many states, particularly larger states, began to desire to play a bigger role in the nominating process, and states began to move their primaries earlier and earlier. By the time of the 2000 campaign, despite the wide open field involving many serious candidates, George W. Bush had secured the nomination by mid-March, many months before the convention. Worse yet, in the eyes of many observers, many voters in large states which would not vote until April (or later) would have no say in the nominating process.

== Opposition and criticism ==
=== Boomerang effect ===
The plan was originally proposed by the Republican National Committee in the spring of 2000, to take effect in the 2004 campaign. However, it was voted down by the general convention that summer. There was some opposition from Iowa delegates, as Iowa would not have been in the first group. More significantly, Republican leaders worried that, if they acted unilaterally, that they would be handing a huge advantage to the Democrats. If the Republicans did indeed use this plan, it would be almost impossible to know who the GOP nominee would be until early or mid-June. But if the Democrats maintained their primary schedule unchanged, then the identity of the Democratic nominee might well be clear in March. This, said some Republican strategists, would provide the Democrats with a three-month "head start" on the general election.

=== Conservative bias ===
Also, there is criticism that the Delaware Plan may be biased against more liberal candidates from either party. Although the first round of the primaries is pretty evenly split between Blue States and Red States, the second round has 2 Blue States to 10 Red, and the third round has 4 Blue States to 9 Red. This could bias both parties toward more conservative candidates within their ranks. For this reason, the Rules and Bylaws Committee of the Democratic National Committee rejected the plan in 2000.

=== Other alternatives ===
Others do not so much oppose the Delaware Plan as support other alternatives to the status quo. For example, many favor a system of regional primaries or a lottery system that allows a mix of large and small population states while preserving the possibility of retail politicking in the early phases of the campaign.

== See also ==
- United States presidential primary
- United States presidential election
- United States presidential election debates
- American presidential debate
- United States presidential nominating convention
- United States Electoral College

Early Votes

- Ames (Iowa) Straw Poll on a Saturday in August prior to the election year, since 1979
- Iowa caucus first official election year event since 1972
- New Hampshire primary first national primary stop since 1952

Reform Plans

- United States presidential primary reform proposals
- Graduated Random Presidential Primary System
- Rotating Regional Primary System
- Interregional Primary Plan
- National Primary
