= Bill Orr (Nebraska first gentleman) =

First Gentleman of Nebraska
- In role January 9, 1987 – January 9, 1991
- Governor: Kay Orr
- Preceded by: Sarah Kerrey
- Succeeded by: Diane Nelson (First Lady)

Personal details
- Born: William Dayton Orr; March 15, 1935 Waukon, Iowa, U.S.
- Died: May 5, 2013 (aged 78) Lincoln, Nebraska, U.S.
- Party: Republican
- Spouse: Kay Stark (m. 1957)
- Children: John; Suzanne
- Parent(s): Lester Duncan (father), Carolyn (Dayton) Orr (mother)

William Dayton Orr (March 15, 1935 – May 5, 2013) was an American insurance executive and author. The husband of former Nebraska Governor Kay A. Orr, he served as the state's first and only First Gentleman to date from 1987 to 1991. Orr's position as a state First Gentleman, an unusual political occupation for a man at the time, earned him national attention. In 1989, Orr published a popular cookbook, the First Gentleman's Cookbook, which sold thousands of copies nationwide. Orr's cookbook included recipes contributed by Nancy Reagan, Warren Buffett, Johnny Carson, and Katharine Hepburn.

== Biography ==
Orr was born in Waukon, Iowa, on March 15, 1935, to Lester Duncan and Carolyn (née Dayton) Orr. His father was a high school coach. He was raised in Columbus Junction, Iowa, just two blocks from his grandparents.

Orr was diagnosed with spinal polio as a child, but made an excellent recovery. He was highly active in school sports, including quarterback of his high school football team, a 440-yard dash runner in track and field, and a basketball player. Bill Orr received a business degree from the University of Iowa.

Bill Orr met his future wife, Kay Stark, at a track meet in 1955. The couple married September 26, 1957, and had two children, Suzanne and John William Orr. The Orrs lived in Illinois until 1963, when the couple moved to Lincoln, Nebraska, so Bill could take a job with Woodman Insurance. Kay Orr became actively involved in state Republican politics as a fundraiser and campaign coordinator. She was elected to her first statewide office, Nebraska State Treasurer, in 1981.

=== Career ===
Orr joined Woodmen Accident and Life Company in 1963, when he first moved to Lincoln. At the time of his wife's election as governor in 1986, Orr was an executive for the Woodmen, where he served as the senior vice president and director of agency and marketing operations. His office overlooked the Nebraska State Capitol. Orr retired in 1997 after a thirty-seven year career with Woodmen.

=== First Gentleman of Nebraska ===
Orr's tenure as First Gentleman began on January 9, 1987, with the inauguration of his wife, Kay A. Orr, as Governor of Nebraska. Kay Orr, a Republican, defeated Democrat Helen Boosalis in the 1986 gubernatorial election to become both the first female Governor of Nebraska and the first female Republican governor of any U.S. state. Bill Orr likewise became the first man to hold the ceremonial position of First Gentleman of Nebraska. Orr remained an insurance executive with Woodmen throughout the duration of his wife's gubernatorial term.

Orr's role as a state First Gentleman was unique for a man in the United States during the 1980s. The nation's only other state First Gentleman at time was Dr. Arthur Kunin, the First Gentleman of Vermont and husband of Governor Madeleine M. Kunin from 1985 to 1991.

Orr conceived the idea of writing a cookbook in December 1985, the one month after his wife's election. He had begun cooking, which he described "as my secret passion," after his wife entered politics, likening the recipes he found to the "Dead Sea Scrolls." In an interview Orr noted, "Recipes were like the Dead Sea Scrolls...Kay's a great cook, but I realized with her involvement in politics that if I was going to have home cooking, I was going to have to do it myself."

In October 1988, Orr publicly announced the upcoming release of his cookbook, which became his first published work. His initial idea for the cookbook had been a one-page sheet, consisting of just nine recipes. Three were recipes for mixed drinks, while the remaining six were for prepared food. The cookbook was expanded to include contributions from other notable Nebraskan men, including Tonight Show host Johnny Carson and football coach Tom Osborne. Ultimately, Orr wrote the cookbook to include recipe submissions from famous men and women with ties to Nebraska or the Orrs. Notable contributors to Orr's cookbook, in addition to Carson and Osborne, included then United States First Lady Barbara Bush, former First Lady Nancy Reagan, Katharine Hepburn, Dick Cavett, and Warren Buffett.

Proceeds from the cookbook, titled "The First Gentleman's Cookbook," were used for a $200,000 fund to renovate and refurbish the Nebraska Governor's Mansion. Bill Orr described the interior design of the mansion, constructed in 1957, as "early Holiday Inn" telling reporters that "We can do better than that." People magazine described Orr as "deploring the decor of the Governor's mansion" prior to the renovation, which was funded by his cookbook.

The First Gentleman's Cookbook, published in 1989, proved very popular, selling thousands of copies nationwide. Readers responded well to Orr's humor and celebrity contributors. Orr's project attracted attention from the national media as well, including People, Fortune, and The New York Times. He appeared as guest on Live with Regis & Kathie Lee and other television shows to promote the book.

Orr jokingly founded the R.G.H., or Republican Governors' Husbands, which he referred to as the most exclusive club in the U.S., since he was the only member. (First Gentleman Kunin of Vermont was a Democrat). He and Kunin often sat together at meetings of governors or governors' spouses. Orr met Denis Thatcher, husband of British Prime Minister Margaret Thatcher, at dinner at the White House, and told him of his admiration for his role in the United Kingdom.

=== Later life ===
Orr retired from Woodmen Accident and Life Co. in 1997 after thirty-seven years with the company. He remained an active member of the Eagle Scouts, the local Rotary Club 14, and an elder with Christ Lutheran Church.

Bill Orr died from a long illness with chronic obstructive pulmonary disease at his home in Lincoln, Nebraska, on May 5, 2013, at the age of 78. He was survived by his wife of 55 years, former Governor Kay Orr; with their two children, John Orr and Suzanne Gage; and seven grandchildren. His funeral was held at Christ Lutheran Church in Lincoln. Tributes for Orr were released by U.S. Senators Mike Johanns and Deb Fischer and U.S. Rep. Jeff Fortenberry.

Honorary titles
Preceded by Vacant (1983-1987)	First Gentleman of Nebraska; 1987–1991	Succeeded by Diane Nelson
