= 1970 Nebraska lieutenant gubernatorial election =

- November 3, 1970

Nominee	Frank Marsh	Ronald E. Reagan
Party	Republican	Democratic
Popular vote	256,487	190,029
Percentage	57.4%	42.6%
- County results Marsh: 50–60% 60–70% 70–80% 80–90% Reagan: 50–60%
Lieutenant Governor before election
John Everroad
Republican
Elected Lieutenant Governor
Frank Marsh
Republican

The 1970 Nebraska lieutenant gubernatorial election was held on November 3, 1970, and featured Nebraska Secretary of State Frank Marsh, a Republican, defeating Democratic nominee Ronald E. Reagan. This was the last Nebraska lieutenant gubernatorial general election where the candidates were elected independently of those in the Nebraska gubernatorial election.

== Democratic primary ==
=== Candidates ===
- Kurt D. Rasmussen
- Ronald E. Reagan, attorney from Bellevue, Nebraska
- James R. Sandstedt

=== Results ===
Democratic primary results
Party	Candidate	Votes	%
Democratic	Ronald E. Reagan	45,411	41.07
Democratic	Kurt D. Rasmussen	36,192	32.73
Democratic	James R. Sandstedt	28,884	26.12
Democratic	Write-in	87	0.08

== Republican primary ==
=== Candidates ===
- Stuart F. Hansen
- Frank Marsh, Secretary of State of Nebraska
- Henry F. Pedersen, Jr., member of the Nebraska Legislature

=== Results ===
Republican primary results
Party	Candidate	Votes	%
Republican	Frank Marsh	109,714	61.74
Republican	Henry F. Pedersen, Jr.	50,652	28.51
Republican	Stuart F. Hansen	17,312	9.74
Republican	Write-in	15	0.01

== General election ==
=== Results ===
Nebraska lieutenant gubernatorial election, 1970
Party	Candidate	Votes	%
Republican	Frank Marsh	256,487	57.44%
Democratic	Ronald E. Reagan	190,029	42.56%
Write-in		23	0.005%
Total votes		446,539	100.00%
Republican hold			

== See also ==
- 1970 Nebraska gubernatorial election
