= Graduated Random Presidential Primary System =

Proposed election reform

The Graduated Random Presidential Primary System, also known as the California Plan or the American Plan, is a proposed system to reform the conduct of United States Presidential primary campaigns. Under this system the campaign period would be broken into ten two-week periods in which an escalating number of electoral votes would be contested. It was developed by aerospace engineer and political scientist Thomas Gangale in 2003 in response to the trend toward front-loading in recent primary campaigns and the influence wielded by Iowa and New Hampshire, which traditionally hold their nominating events before any other state.

== The Plan ==
Under the American Plan, the primary season would be divided into ten two-week periods. In the first period, any combination of randomly selected states (or territories) could vote, as long as their combined number of electoral votes added up to eight. The territories of American Samoa, Guam, Puerto Rico, and the Virgin Islands, which do not hold electoral votes but do send delegates to nominating conventions, are counted as holding one electoral vote each, as would the District of Columbia. (The 23rd Amendment states that the District may send electors to the Electoral College, as long as it does not have more votes than the least populous state.) In each subsequent period, the number of votes contested would increase by eight. As a result, the early campaign would feature contests in several small states or a few larger ones, becoming more and more demanding as time went by. The mathematical expression is:

$\sum_{n=1}^{10} 8n$

Because of the large gap between populations of the most populous states, California - the state with the highest population - could vote no earlier than the seventh period, while the second most populous state, Texas, as well as New York and Florida, the third and fourth largest, could vote in the fourth. California, unlike all other states, would always have to hold its primary toward the end of the campaign. To remedy this, the later stages of the California Plan primary are staggered. The seventh period (8x7) is moved before the fourth (8x4), the eighth (8x8) before the fifth (8x5), and the ninth (8x9) before the sixth (8x6).

Number of electoral votes by period
Period n°	Electoral votes
1	8
2	16
3	24
4	56
5	32
6	64
7	40
8	72
9	48
10	80

== Criticism and support ==
In response to criticism that the random selection system of the American Plan could lead to high travel costs for candidates, John Nichols claims these costs are minimal compared to the costs of running full TV, radio, print and online media campaigns in several states simultaneously, as would happen under the large regional plans. However, such advertising buys would also be necessary under the American Plan in later rounds.

The plan is supported by:

- California Democratic Party
- California Young Democrats
- Connecticut Lieutenant Governor Susan Bysiewicz
- FairVote
- OPS-Alaska
- Young Democrats of America

The American Plan was the only systematic reform cited in the December 2005 Report of the Commission on Presidential Nomination Timing and Scheduling to Democratic National Committee chairman Howard Dean:

"In considering the options for 2012 the Commission encourages the Party to think boldly, including for example, [Rules and Bylaws Committee] consideration of the proposal known as the American Plan which would spread the calendar of contests across ten intervals of time and randomly select the order of the states from one presidential election cycle to the next."

== See also ==
- United States presidential primary
- United States presidential election
- United States presidential election debates
- United States presidential nominating convention
- Electoral College (United States)

Reform plans

- United States presidential primary reform proposals
- Delaware Plan
- Rotating Regional Primary System
- Interregional Primary Plan
- National Primary
