= Rotating Regional Primary System =

Proposed electoral reform in the US

The Rotating Regional Primary System is a proposed system for reform of the United States presidential primary process, in which the country would be divided into four regions for primary elections. The plan has been promoted since 1999 by the National Association of Secretaries of State.

== Details ==
Map of the Rotating Regional Plan. Red is East, Yellow is Midwest, Green is South, and Blue is the West region.

The plan provides that the individual state primaries (or caucuses) would be grouped into four regions, each region voting in a different month—either March, April, May or June. Individual states in a region would vote on or soon after the first Tuesday of their month, though not necessarily on the same day. The first year, the order would be determined by lottery, and subsequently rotate for each election.

To continue traditional early primaries in Iowa and New Hampshire, they would be permitted to hold their primaries or caucus before any of the regions.

Regional Groupings:

- East: Connecticut, Delaware, Maine, Maryland, Massachusetts, New Jersey, New York, Pennsylvania, Rhode Island, Vermont, West Virginia and the District of Columbia.
- South: Alabama, Arkansas, Florida, Georgia, Kentucky, Louisiana, Mississippi, North Carolina, Oklahoma, South Carolina, Tennessee, Texas, Virginia, Puerto Rico and the Virgin Islands.
- Midwest: Illinois, Indiana, Kansas, Michigan, Minnesota, Missouri, Nebraska, North Dakota, Ohio, South Dakota and Wisconsin.
- West: Alaska, Arizona, California, Colorado, Hawaii, Idaho, Montana, Nevada, New Mexico, Oregon, Utah, Washington, Wyoming and Guam.

== Criticism ==
Both the Republican and Democratic parties have been indifferent to the concept. In 2000, the Republican National Committee's Advisory Commission on the Presidential Nominating Process passed over the Rotating Regional plan in favor of the Delaware Plan. In 2005, the Democratic National Committee's Commission on Presidential Nomination Timing and Scheduling ranked it ninth on a list of ten priorities, just above keeping the status quo.

=== Large initial primary size ===
The size of the initial regional primary may be large enough to prevent less-funded candidates from being able to compete.

== Options ==
Map of same-sized politically balanced regions. All four regions voted between 48% and 53% (and between 48% and 59% of electoral votes) for the GOP in the most recent election. Note loss of contiguity in the red and green regions.

=== Lottery system ===
Larry Sabato, Director of the University of Virginia Center for Politics, proposed a lottery system in his book A More Perfect Constitution. This would use the same regions as above, but would wait until about six months before the first primary and then select the order of the primaries. This would stop candidates from "camping out" in early primary states.

This can also be adjusted to prevent a region from being picked twice in a row, or to prevent any region that went first the last two times from going first.

=== Politically balanced regions ===
One criticism of the regional system is that the East is a very liberal region, while the South is very conservative. Given the stability of the voting patterns over the last several elections, regions might be balanced politically, at the possible cost of some contiguity. For example, instead of including Pennsylvania, Maryland and New Jersey in with New York and New England, a balanced region might bounce over to Ohio, Indiana, and Kentucky instead. There would be a loss of regional identity, and non-contiguous regions, but there would be a gain of political balance.

=== Combination of final two regions ===
In a given election, after the first and second regions have held primaries, the remaining two regions can be combined to hold a final primary. This would shorten the primary schedule, and leave no fourth primary likely scheduled after the nominees have been selected.

== See also ==
- United States presidential election
- United States presidential nominating convention
- Electoral College (United States)
- Ames Straw Poll
- Iowa caucus
- New Hampshire primary
- Graduated Random Presidential Primary System
- Delaware Plan
- Interregional Primary Plan
- United States presidential primary § Reform proposals
