= United States presidential primary =

Nominating process of candidates for United States presidential elections

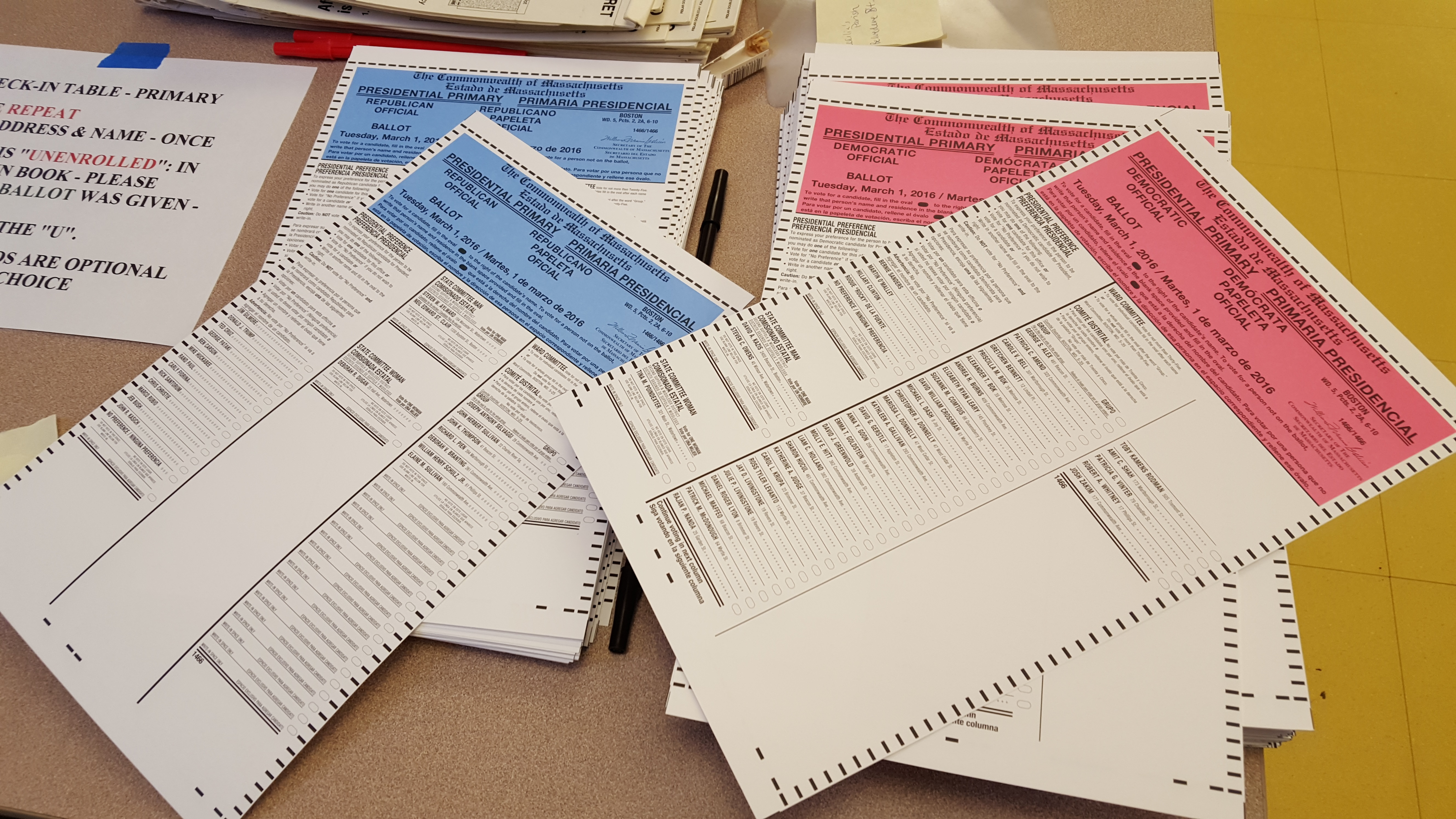
2016 presidential primary election ballots in Massachusetts

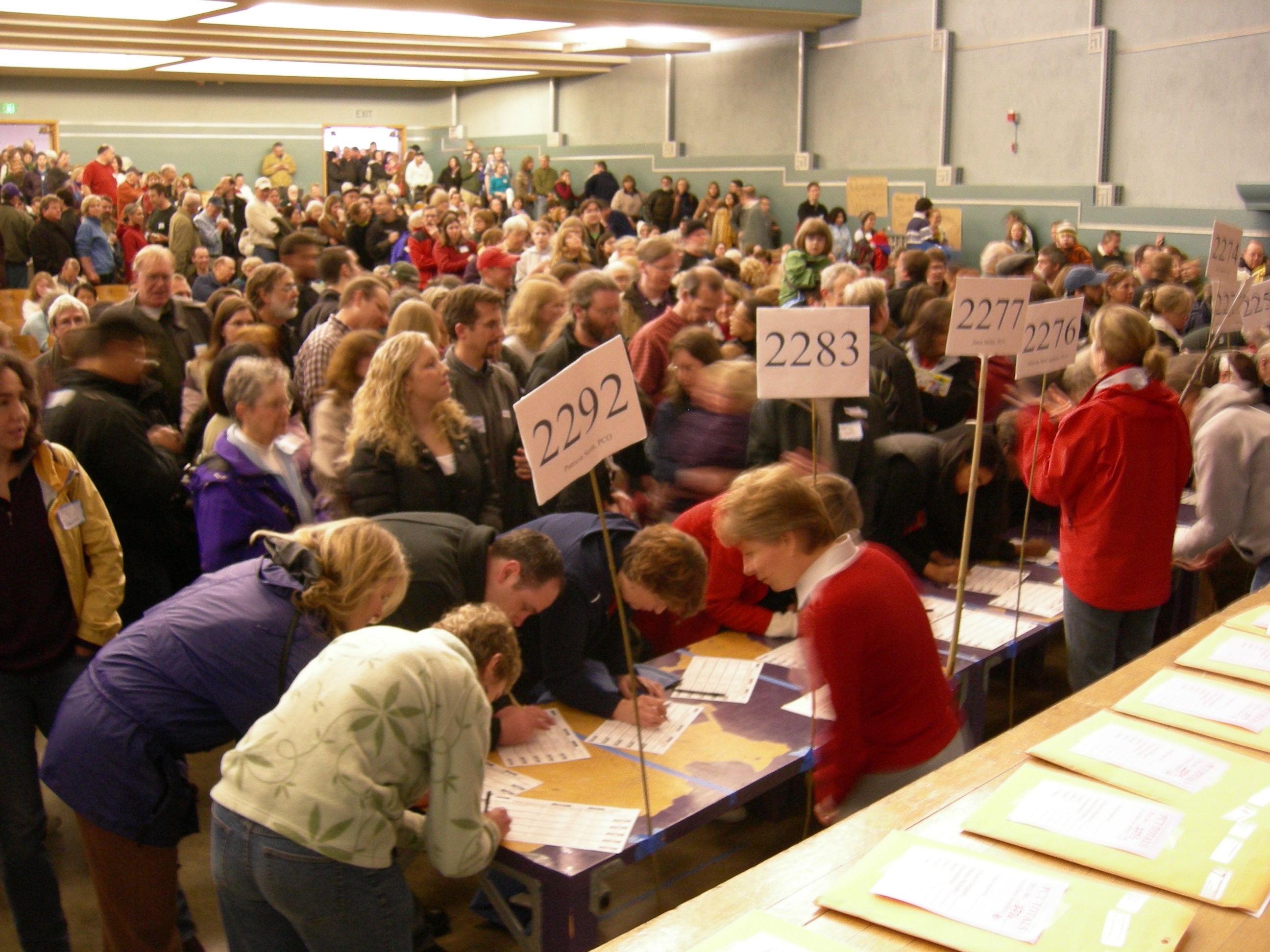
Voters checking in at a 2008 Washington State Democratic caucus held at the Nathan Eckstein Middle School in Seattle

Each of the 50 U.S. states, the District of Columbia, and five territories of the United States hold either primary elections or caucuses to help nominate individual candidates for president of the United States. This process is designed to choose the candidates that will represent their political parties in the general election.

The United States Constitution has never specified this process; political parties have developed their own procedures over time. Some states hold only primary elections, some hold only caucuses, and others use a combination of both. These primaries and caucuses are staggered, generally beginning sometime in January or February, and ending about mid-June before the general election in November. State and local governments run the primary elections, while caucuses are private events that are directly run by the political parties themselves. A state's primary election or caucus is usually an indirect election: instead of voters directly selecting a particular person running for president, they determine the number of delegates a candidate will receive from their respective state for each party's national convention. These delegates then in turn select their party's presidential nominee. The first state in the United States to hold its presidential primary was North Dakota in 1912, following on Oregon's successful implementation of its system in 1910.

Each party determines how many delegates it allocates to each state. Along with those "pledged" delegates chosen during the primaries and caucuses, state delegations to both the Democratic and Republican conventions also include "unpledged" delegates who have a vote. For Republicans, they consist of the three top party officials who serve At Large from each state and territory. Democrats have a more expansive group of unpledged delegates called "superdelegates", who are party leaders and elected officials. If no single candidate has secured an absolute majority of delegates (including both pledged and unpledged), then a "brokered convention" occurs: all pledged delegates are "released" after the first round of voting and are able to switch their allegiance to a different candidate, and then additional rounds take place until there is a winner with an absolute majority.

The staggered nature of the presidential primary season allows candidates to concentrate their resources in each area of the country one at a time instead of campaigning in every state simultaneously. In some of the less populous states, this allows campaigning to take place on a much more personal scale. However, the overall results of the primary season may not be representative of the U.S. electorate as a whole: voters in Iowa, New Hampshire and other less populous states which traditionally hold their primaries and caucuses in late-January/February usually have a major impact on the races, while voters in California and other large states which traditionally hold their primaries in June generally end up having a significantly reduced say because the races are usually over by then. As a result, more states vie for earlier primaries, known as "front-loading", to claim a greater influence in the process. The national parties have used penalties and awarded bonus delegates in efforts to stagger the system over broadly a 90-day window. Where state legislatures set the primary or caucus date, sometimes the out-party in that state has endured penalties in the number of delegates it can send to the national convention.

== History ==
=== Background ===
There is no provision for the role of political parties in the United States Constitution, since the Founding Fathers did not originally intend for American politics to be partisan. In Federalist Papers No. 9 and No. 10, Alexander Hamilton and James Madison, respectively, wrote specifically about the dangers of domestic political factions. Thus in the first two presidential elections, the Electoral College handled the nominations and elections in 1789 and 1792 that selected George Washington. The beginnings of the American two-party system then emerged from Washington's immediate circle of advisors. Hamilton and Madison, who wrote the aforementioned Federalist Papers against political factions, ended up being the core leaders in this partisanship: Hamilton became the leader of Federalist Party while Madison co-helmed the Democratic-Republican Party with Thomas Jefferson.

=== Congressional caucus era (1796–1832) ===
Starting with the 1796 election, congressional party or a state legislature party caucus selected the party's presidential candidates. Before 1820, Democratic-Republican members of Congress would nominate a single candidate from their party. That system collapsed in 1824, and since 1832 the preferred mechanism for nomination has been a national convention.

=== Caucus and convention era (1832–1912) ===
The first national convention to nominate a presidential candidate was called by the Anti-Masonic Party in 1831, as they could not use the caucus system because they had no congressmen. The party leaders instead called for a national meeting of supporters to set the party's candidate. This convention was held in Baltimore, Maryland, on September 26, 1831, which selected William Wirt as their presidential candidate.

Delegates to the national convention were usually selected at state conventions whose own delegates were chosen by district conventions. Sometimes they were dominated by intrigue between political bosses who controlled delegates; the national convention was far from democratic or transparent.

=== Mixed primary and caucus era (1912–68) ===
Progressive Era reformers looked to the primary election as a way to measure popular opinion of candidates, as opposed to the opinion of the bosses. Florida enacted the first presidential primary in 1901. The Wisconsin direct open primary of 1905 was the first to eliminate the caucus and mandate direct selection of national convention delegates. In 1910, Oregon became the first state to establish a presidential preference primary, which requires delegates to the National Convention to support the winner of the primary at the convention. By 1912, twelve states either selected delegates in primaries, used a preferential primary, or both. By 1920 there were 20 states with primaries, but some went back, and from 1936 to 1968, 12 states used them.

The primary received its first major test in the 1912 election pitting incumbent president William Howard Taft against challengers Theodore Roosevelt and Robert La Follette. Roosevelt proved the most popular candidate, but as most primaries were non-binding "preference" shows and held in only fourteen of the-then forty-eight states, the Republican nomination went to Taft, who controlled the convention.

Seeking to boost voter turnout, New Hampshire simplified its ballot access laws in 1949. In the ensuing non-binding "beauty contest" of 1952, Republican Dwight Eisenhower demonstrated his broad voter appeal by out-polling the favored Robert A. Taft, "Mr. Republican." Also, Democrat Estes Kefauver defeated incumbent president Harry S. Truman, leading the latter to decide not to run for another term. The first-in-the-nation New Hampshire primary has since become a widely observed test of candidates' viability.

=== National binding primary era (1972–present) ===
The impetus for national adoption of the binding primary election was the chaotic 1968 Democratic National Convention. Vice President Hubert Humphrey secured the presidential nomination despite not winning a single primary under his own name. After this, a Democratic National Committee-commissioned panel led by Senator George McGovern – the McGovern–Fraser Commission – recommended that states adopt new rules to assure wider participation. A large number of states, faced with the need to conform to more detailed rules for the selection of national delegates, chose a presidential primary as an easier way to come into compliance with the new national Democratic Party rules. The result was that many more future delegates would be selected by a state presidential primary. The Republicans also adopted many more state presidential primaries. By 1992, Democrats had primaries in 40 states and Republicans in 39.

== Procedure ==
Both major political parties of the U.S.—the Democratic Party and the Republican Party—officially nominate their candidate for president at their respective national conventions. Each of these conventions is attended by a number of delegates selected in accordance with the given party's bylaws. The results of the presidential primaries and caucuses bind many of these delegates, known as pledged delegates, to vote for a particular candidate.

Both parties also have a group of unpledged delegates. Republicans have three At-Large delegates selected at the state convention from all the states and territories, 168 in number. These are each states' two national committeepersons and the state chairperson.

In Democratic primaries through 2016, about 85% of delegates to the Democratic National Convention are "pledged delegates" who are apportioned to candidates according to the results of primaries and caucuses. The remaining 15% are unpledged superdelegates (consisting of sitting Democratic governors, sitting Democratic members of Congress [i.e., senators and representatives], former and current Democratic presidents and vice presidents, and a few leaders of Democratic National Committee-affiliated organizations, such as the Young Democrats of America) who can vote for whomever they wish. Some superdelegates are former or current state or federal lobbyists. In 2016, following a push by independent Senator Bernie Sanders, who ran as a Democrat, the party voted in favor of superdelegate reform, such that in future presidential elections most superdelegates will be bound to their state primary results.

=== Types of primaries and caucuses ===
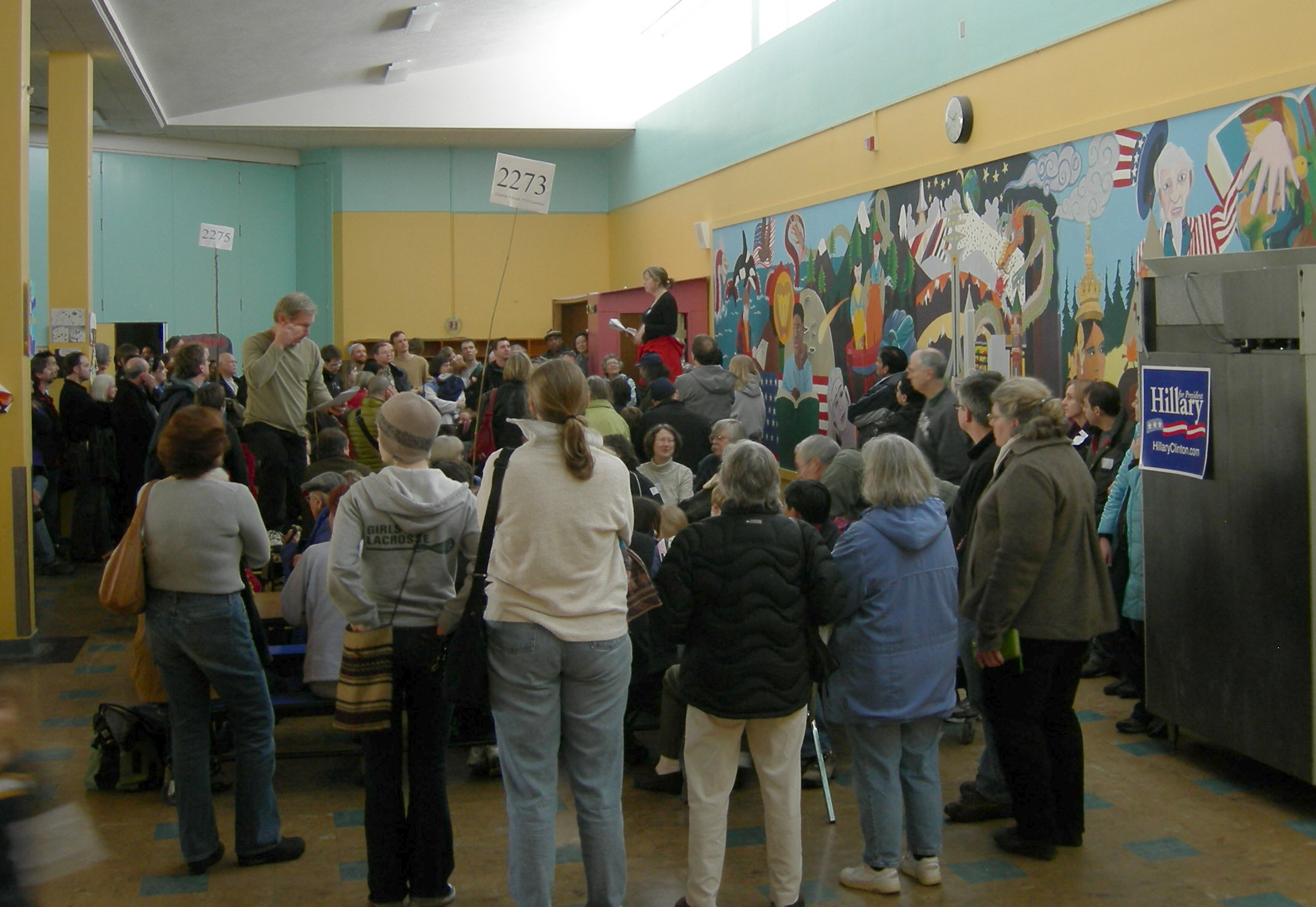
A 2008 Washington state Democratic caucus held in the school lunchroom of Eckstein Middle School in Seattle. In some states like Washington, voters attend local meetings run by the parties instead of polling places to cast their selections.

2024 Republican Party presidential primaries, rules Open primary Semi-closed primary Closed primary Canceled

2024 Democratic Party presidential primaries, rules Open primary Semi-closed primary Closed primary Canceled

Franchise in a primary or caucus is governed by rules established by the state party, although the states may impose other regulations.

While most states hold primary elections, a handful of states hold caucuses. Instead of going to a polling place, voters attend local private events run by the political parties, and cast their selections there. One disadvantage of caucuses is that the state party runs the process directly instead of having the state and local governments run them. Another is that most election laws do not normally apply to caucuses.

Nearly all states have a binding primary or caucus, in which the results of the election depending on state law or party rules legally bind some or all of the delegates to vote for a particular candidate at the national convention, for a certain number of ballots or until the candidate releases the delegates. Some binding primaries are winner-take-all contests, in which all of a state's delegates are required to vote for the same candidate. In a proportional vote, a state's delegation is allocated in proportion to the candidates' percent of the popular vote in a congressional district. In many of those states that have proportional vote primaries, a candidate must meet a certain threshold in the popular vote to be given delegates.

Some states may use a binding walking subcaucus system, where voters may instead be choosing pledged delegates to a local, county or state party convention, which then, in turn, selects pledged delegates to the national convention. A handful of states may also practice non-binding "beauty contests", which are public opinion surveys for use by caucus delegates to select candidates to a state convention, which then in turn selects delegates to the national convention.

In many states, only voters registered with a party may vote in that party's primary, known as a closed primary. In some states, a semi-closed primary is practiced, in which voters unaffiliated with a party (independents) may choose a party primary in which to vote. In an open primary, any voter may vote in any party's primary. A semi-open primary occurs when a voter must choose a party-specific ballot to cast, instead of being provided a single ballot where the voter must choose on the ballot itself which party's primary to vote in. In all of these systems, a voter may participate in only one primary; that is, a voter who casts a vote for a candidate standing for the Republican nomination for president cannot cast a vote for a candidate standing for the Democratic nomination, or vice versa. A few states once staged a blanket primary, in which voters could vote for one candidate in multiple primaries, but the practice was struck down by the U.S. Supreme Court in the 2000 case of California Democratic Party v. Jones as violating the freedom of assembly guaranteed by the First Amendment.

=== Delegate selection rules ===
Both the Democratic Party and the Republican Party usually modify their delegate selection rules between presidential elections, including how delegates are allocated to each state and territory.

Under the current Democratic Party selection rules, adopted in 2006, pledged delegates are selected under proportional representation, which requires a candidate have a minimum of 15% of a state's popular vote to receive delegates. In addition, the Democratic Party may reject any candidate under their bylaws. Each state publishes a Delegate Selection Plan that notes the mechanics of calculating the number of delegates per congressional district, and how votes are transferred from local conventions to the state and national convention. Since the 2012 Democratic primaries, the number of pledged delegates allocated to each of the 50 U.S. states and Washington, D.C., is based on two main factors: (1) the proportion of votes each state gave to the Democratic candidate in the last three presidential elections, and (2) the number of electoral votes each state has in the United States Electoral College. The U.S. Territories of American Samoa, Guam, the Northern Mariana Islands, Puerto Rico, and the US Virgin Islands are instead assigned a fixed number of pledged delegates. States and territories who schedule their primary or caucus later in the primary season may also get additional bonus delegates.

The Republican Party's rules since 2008 leave more discretion to the states in choosing a method of allocating pledged delegates. As a result, states variously applied the statewide winner-take-all method (e.g., New York), district- and state-level winner-take-all (e.g., California), or proportional allocation (e.g., Massachusetts). Changes in the rules before 2012 brought proportional representation to more states. The number of Republican pledged delegates allocated to each of the 50 U.S. states is 10 at-large delegates, plus three district delegates for each congressional district. Washington, D.C., and the five U.S. Territories are instead assigned a fixed number of pledged delegates. States and territories get bonus delegates based on whether it (if applicable) has a Republican governor, it has GOP majorities in one or all chambers of its state legislature, whether one or both of its U.S. senators are Republican, it has a GOP majority in its delegation to the U.S. House of Representatives, and whether its electoral college votes went to the Republican candidate in the last presidential election.

Each party's bylaws also specify which current and former elected officeholders and party leaders qualify as unpledged delegates. Because of possible deaths, resignations, or the results of intervening or special elections, the final number of these superdelegates may not be known until the week of the convention.

=== In U.S. territories ===
The primary and caucus system is the only method in which voters in Puerto Rico, Guam, and other U.S. territories can have a say in the presidential race. Under the U.S. Constitution, U.S. territories are not represented in the Electoral College, and thus voters residing in those areas are basically ineligible to vote in the general election. On the other hand, as stated above, the primaries and caucuses are non-governmental party affairs. Both the Democratic and Republican parties, as well as other third parties, have agreed to let these territories participate in the presidential nomination process. In the two major party's rules, "territories" are referred to as "states", which can be carried over in discussion and media implying there are more than 50 states.

=== Delegate voting at the convention ===
During the convention, there is generally a roll call of the votes. Each delegation announces its vote tallies, usually accompanied with some boosterism of their state or territory. The delegation may pass, nominally to retally their delegates' preferences, but often to allow a different delegation to give the leading candidate the honor of casting the majority-making vote.

If no single candidate has secured a majority of delegates (including both pledged and unpledged) during the first vote, then a "brokered convention" results. All pledged delegates are then "released" and are able to switch their allegiance to a different candidate. Thereafter, the nomination is decided through a process of alternating political horse trading, and additional rounds of re-votes.

A customary ceremonial practice has been for the losing candidate(s) in the primary season to "release" their delegates at the convention and exhort them to vote for the winning nominee as a sign of party unity. Thus, the vote tallied on the convention floor is unanimous or nearly so. For example, during the 2008 Democratic National Convention, Hillary Clinton (who only captured about 22% of delegates compared to Barack Obama's approximate 72%) moved to nominate Obama by acclamation, making it a unanimous vote.

== Calendar ==
Campaigning for president often begins almost a year before the New Hampshire primary, almost two years before the presidential election. This is largely because federal campaign finance laws including the Federal Election Campaign Act state that a candidate who intends to receive contributions aggregating in excess of $5,000 or make expenditures aggregating in excess of $5,000, among others, must first file a Statement of Candidacy with the Federal Election Commission. Thus, presidential candidates officially announce their intentions to run that early so they can start raising or spending the money needed to mount their nationwide campaigns.

During the first six months of the year, primaries and caucuses are separately held in each of the 50 states; the District of Columbia, and each of the five permanently inhabited US territories of American Samoa, Guam, the Northern Mariana Islands, Puerto Rico, and the US Virgin Islands. Each party sets its own calendar and rules, and in some cases actually administers the election. However, to reduce expenses and encourage turnout, the major parties' primaries are usually held the same day and may be consolidated with other state elections. The primary election itself is administered by local governments according to state law. In some cases, state law determines how delegates will be awarded and who may participate in the primary; where it does not, party rules prevail.

Since the 1970s, states have held increasingly early primaries to maximize their leverage (see Front-loading and compression below). In reaction to these moves, both the Democratic and Republican National Committees imposed a timing tier system of scheduling rules, stripping states of delegates if they move their primaries early, such as the case in both the Florida Democratic primary and the Florida Republican primary in 2008.

=== Iowa and New Hampshire ===
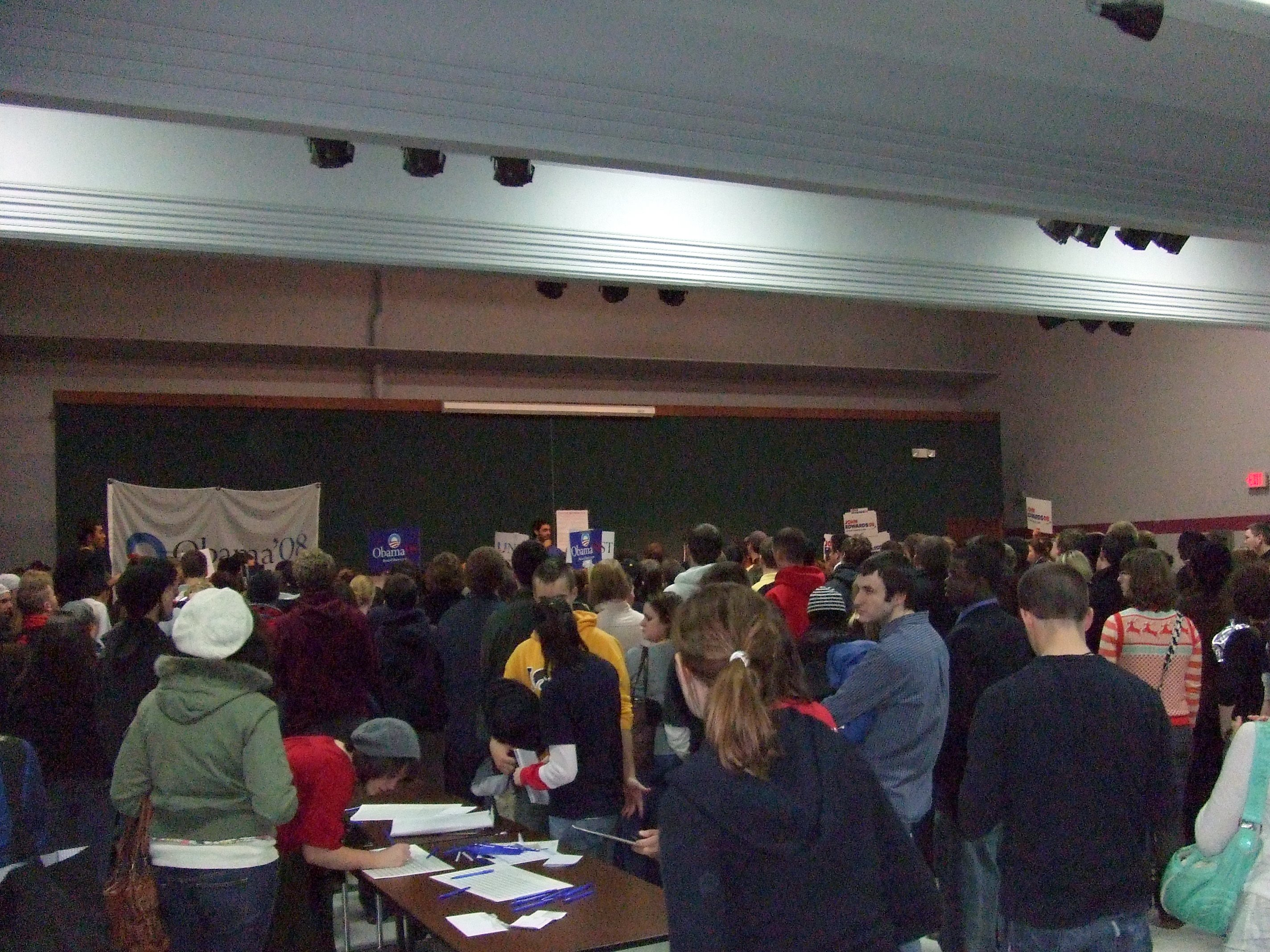
A 2008 Democratic caucus meeting in Iowa City, Iowa. The Iowa caucuses are traditionally the first major electoral event of presidential primaries and caucuses.

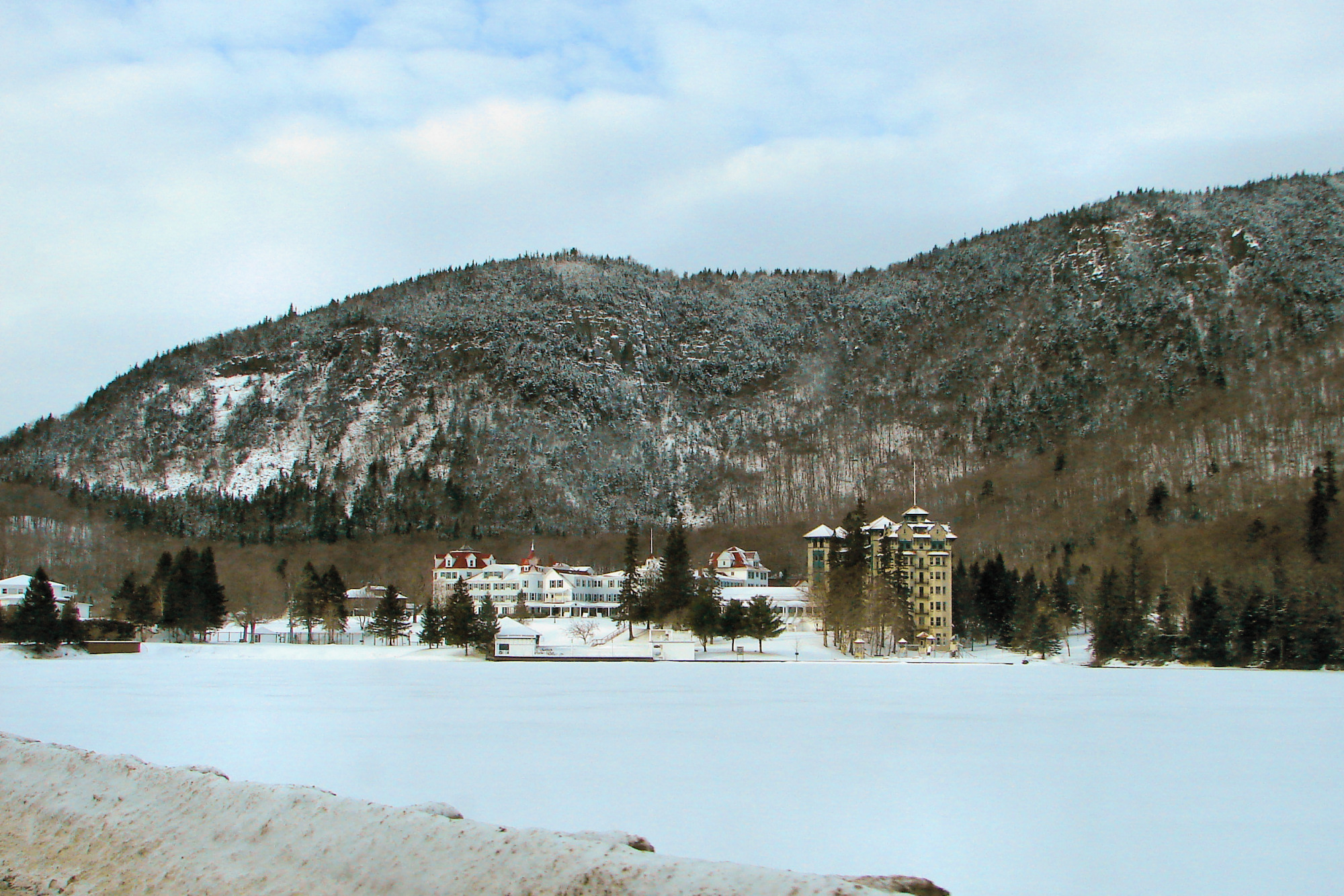
The Balsams Grand Resort Hotel in Dixville Notch, New Hampshire, the site of the first "midnight vote" in the New Hampshire primary.

The first binding event, in which a candidate can secure convention delegates, is traditionally the Iowa caucus, usually held in late January or early February of the presidential election year. It is generally followed by the New Hampshire primary, the first primary by tradition since 1920 and by New Hampshire state law. New Hampshire law states the primary shall be held "on the Tuesday at least seven days immediately preceding the date on which any other state shall hold a similar election." The Iowa caucuses are not considered to be "a similar election" under New Hampshire's law because the former uses caucuses instead of primary elections. Should any other state move its primary too close to New Hampshire's, or before, the New Hampshire secretary of state is required to reschedule the primary accordingly.

In recent elections, the Iowa caucuses and New Hampshire primary have garnered over half the media attention paid to the entire selection process. After Iowa and New Hampshire, the front runners then attempt to solidify their status, while the others fight to become #2.

Because these states are small, campaigning takes place on a much more personal scale. As a result, even a little-known, underfunded candidate can use retail politics to meet intimately with interested voters and perform better than expected. The Iowa caucuses and New Hampshire primary have produced a number of headline-making upsets in history:

- Harry S. Truman ended his presidential re-election bid in 1952 after losing the Democratic Party's New Hampshire primary.
- Lyndon Baines Johnson dropped his 1968 presidential reelection bid after performing far below expectations in the Democratic Party's New Hampshire primary.
- In the 1972 Democratic primaries, George McGovern was initially considered a dark horse but he had better-than-expected second-place finishes in Iowa and New Hampshire and eventually won the nomination; frontrunner Edmund Muskie who won both contests instead lost momentum.
- Jimmy Carter had entered the 1976 presidential race with extremely low name recognition and seemingly little chance against nationally better-known politicians but Carter became the Democratic Party front-runner early on by winning the Iowa caucuses and the New Hampshire primary and he went on to win the nomination.
- George H. W. Bush won the Iowa caucus in 1980, leading him to claim that he had "Big Mo" (momentum) over Republican Party presidential frontrunner Ronald Reagan. However, Reagan won the New Hampshire primary and several others to take the nomination. Eight years later, in the 1988 Republican presidential nomination battle, Bush, serving as Reagan's vice president, unexpectedly finished third in Iowa which Bob Dole won. Dole was also leading in New Hampshire polls but ended up losing that primary as he failed to counterattack ads from Bush. Bush had no serious trouble clinching the nomination afterward.
- Gary Hart was initially not considered a serious contender in 1984, which featured former vice president Walter Mondale as the Democratic Party presidential frontrunner. However, Hart had a respectable showing in Iowa and then stunned Mondale in New Hampshire, the latter where Hart had started campaigning months earlier. This resulted in a long primary battle, with Mondale eventually emerging as the nominee after Super Tuesday III.
- Pat Buchanan's 2nd place showing in the 1992 and win in the 1996 New Hampshire primaries coincided with the weakness of the future Republican Party presidential nominees, incumbent George H. W. Bush, and Senator Bob Dole respectively; Bush and Dole subsequently lost the general election.
- In 1992, then-Governor Bill Clinton's better-than-expected second-place finish in New Hampshire salvaged his campaign and he went on to win the Democratic Party's presidential nomination, following on to be elected president with a 43% plurality.
- Senator John McCain upset George W. Bush in the Republican Party's New Hampshire primary in 2000, Bush's frontrunner campaign had initially not expected serious opposition after other potential candidates like Elizabeth Dole and Dan Quayle decided not to run. McCain's new-found momentum ended after his defeat in the South Carolina primary (see below), and though he pulled out wins in Michigan and his home state of Arizona, his campaign was ended by Super Tuesday.
- In the 2004 primaries, John Kerry, whose campaign had been sagging in prior months, won the Democratic Party's Iowa caucus while John Edwards unexpectedly finished second, over heavily favored Howard Dean and Richard Gephardt (the latter two had been trading negative attacks in the weeks leading up to the vote). Gephardt immediately ended his campaign, while Dean's post-concession speech drew negative attention. Kerry went on to overcome Dean's initial lead in New Hampshire to win that primary, and eventually the Democratic presidential nomination.
- In 2008, Democratic Party presidential frontrunner Hillary Clinton, whose campaign initially banked on a knockout victory in Iowa, unexpectedly finished third in that caucus behind winner Barack Obama and John Edwards. Clinton then pulled off a comeback victory in New Hampshire where Obama had been leading the polls. Although Obama and Clinton were largely well matched in most of the subsequent primaries, Obama's better organization and uncontested caucus victories were crucial to his winning the Democratic nomination.
- In 2008, John McCain, initially struggling among Republican Party contenders in 2007, decided to skip Iowa and concentrate on New Hampshire (the same primary where he had unexpectedly triumphed back in 2000) and McCain's win rejuvenated his presidential campaign and he became the Republican nominee. Rudy Giuliani and Mitt Romney, two candidates who had each led in the polls in 2007, did not perform as expected in Iowa and New Hampshire.
- In 2012, Mitt Romney was initially reported to be the first Republican Party non-incumbent presidential candidate, since the Iowa caucus started in 1976, to win both the Iowa caucus (albeit, by an 8-vote margin over Rick Santorum) and New Hampshire primary. However a final count released by the Iowa state party sixteen days after the caucus contest reported Santorum as the winner by 34 votes over Romney, but by then Romney had already won New Hampshire by a comfortable margin.

=== Nevada ===
In 2008 Nevada was given the official "First in the West" status reflecting the growing importance of the West as well as Nevada's electoral bellwether status. America's increasing ethnic diversity, urbanization, and geographic redistribution made influential political leaders come to the realization that Iowa and New Hampshire were not representative of the rest of the country. Following the 2004 election, then-Senate majority leader Harry Reid began making a case for Nevada as the perfect American microcosm. Since 2012, the Nevada caucuses have been the third race in the process after Iowa and New Hampshire.

=== South Carolina ===
South Carolina is generally the "First in the South" primary. For the Republicans, it is considered a "firewall" to protect establishment favorites and frontrunners in the presidential nomination race, being designed to stop the momentum of insurgent candidates who could have received a boost from strong showings in Iowa and New Hampshire. From its inception in 1980 through the election of 2008, the winner of the South Carolina Republican presidential primary has gone on to win the nomination. In the 2012 Republican primaries, Newt Gingrich initially finished poorly in the early states, but then scored an upset victory in South Carolina over frontrunner Mitt Romney. However, after suffering a decisive defeat to Romney in Florida, Gingrich's campaign was relegated back to third place, leaving Rick Santorum as the main challenger to Romney for the rest of the primaries.

In 2020, a decisive win in the South Carolina primary helped former Vice President Joe Biden win the Democratic presidential primary by eliminating several rivals and triggering strong wins across the country on Super Tuesday. Biden had previously struggled in Iowa and New Hampshire.

=== Super Tuesday ===
The Tuesday in February or March when the greatest number of states hold primary elections and caucuses is known as "Super Tuesday". Because it is held in various states from geographically and socially diverse regions of the country, it typically represents a presidential candidate's first test of national electability. More delegates can be won on Super Tuesday than on any other single day of the primary calendar, thus convincing wins during this day have usually propelled candidates to their party's nomination.

=== Front-loading and coordination ===
With the broadened use of the primary system, states have tried to increase their influence in the nomination process. One tactic has been to create geographic blocs to encourage candidates to spend time in a region. Vermont and Massachusetts attempted to stage a joint New England primary on the first Tuesday of March, but New Hampshire refused to participate so it could retain its traditional place as the first primary. The first regional primary was the Southern Super Tuesday of March 8, 1988, in which nine states united in the idea that a candidate would reflect regional interests. It failed as all but two of the eight major candidates won at least one primary on that day.

Another trend is to stage earlier and earlier primaries, given impetus by Super Tuesday and the mid-1990s move (since repealed) of the California primary and its bloc of votes—the largest in the nation—from June to March. To retain its tradition as the first primary in the country (and adhere to a state law which requires it to be), New Hampshire moved their primary forward, from early March to early January.

A major reason states try to increase their influence, and vie for earlier primaries, is that in recent years the races have usually been decided before the primary season has ended in June. For example, John McCain officially clinched the 2008 Republican presidential nomination in March, while during that same month Barack Obama held a substantial lead in pledged delegates in the Democratic Party primaries. In 2012, Obama faced no major challenger in the Democratic Party primaries since he had the advantage of incumbency (see below), while Mitt Romney gained enough delegates to be declared the presumptive Republican nominee by late April.

In 2012, both the Republicans and the Democrats moved their Florida primary to January 31, which was an earlier date than past election cycles. In response, other states also changed their primary election dates for 2012, in order to claim a greater influence, creating a cascade of changes in other states. This followed what happened in 2008 when Nevada moved its caucuses to January, causing other states to also move their primaries to earlier dates. Senate majority leader and Nevada senator Harry Reid was a major proponent of moving that state's caucuses to January, arguing that Nevada would be the perfect American microcosm: its western location, significant minority population, and strong labor population would be more representative of the country as a whole than Iowa and New Hampshire.

Both parties then enacted stricter timing rules for 2016: primaries and caucuses cannot start until February 1; and only Iowa, New Hampshire, South Carolina and Nevada are entitled to February contests.

== Criticism ==
=== Representativeness ===
Because they are the states that traditionally hold their respective contests first, the Iowa caucuses and the New Hampshire primary usually attract the most media attention; however, critics, such as Mississippi secretary of state Eric Clark and Tennessee senator William Brock, point out that these states are not representative of the United States as a whole: they are more overwhelmingly white, rural, and wealthy than the national average, and neither is in the fast-growing West or South.

Conversely, states that traditionally hold their primaries in June, like California (the most populous state overall) and New Jersey (the most densely populated state), usually end up having no say in who the presidential candidate will be. As stated above, the races were usually over well before June. California and New Jersey moved their primaries to February for the 2008 election, but in 2012 both states ended up moving them back to June. California lawmakers stated that consolidating their presidential and statewide primary election in June saves them about $100 million, and that it is not worth the cost when there is generally no competitive balance between the two political parties within California.

In 2005, the primary commission of the Democratic National Committee began considering removing Iowa and New Hampshire from the top of the calendar, but this proposal never gained approval, so those two states remain as the first two contests. New Hampshire also fought back by obliging candidates who wanted to campaign in the state to pledge to uphold that primary as the first one.

Maps of the Democratic Party (left) and the Republican Party (right) primary and caucus dates, 2016. The staggered nature of the primary and caucus season is source of criticism of the presidential nomination process

=== Front-loading and compression ===
States vie for earlier primaries to claim greater influence in the nomination process, as the early primaries can act as a signal to the nation, showing which candidates are popular and giving those who perform well early on the advantage of the bandwagon effect. Also, candidates can ignore primaries that fall after the nomination has already been secured, and would owe less to those states politically. As a result, rather than stretching from March to July, most primaries take place in a compressed time frame in February and March. National party leaders also have an interest in compressing the primary calendar, as it enables the party to reduce the chance of a bruising internecine battle and to preserve resources for the general campaign.

In such a primary season, however, many primaries will fall on the same day, forcing candidates to choose where to spend their time and resources. Indeed, Super Tuesday was created deliberately to increase the influence of the South. When states cannot agree to coordinate primaries, however, attention flows to larger states with large numbers of delegates at the expense of smaller ones. Because the candidate's time is limited, paid advertising may play a greater role. Moreover, a compressed calendar limits the ability of lesser-known candidates to corral resources and raise their visibility among voters, especially when a better-known candidate enjoys the financial and institutional backing of the party establishment.

In an article from Detroit News, Tennessee Senator William (Bill) Brock said about front-loading, "Today, too many people in too many states have no voice in the election of our major party nominees. For them, the nominations are over before they have begun."

=== Role of superdelegates ===
The term "superdelegate" itself was used originally as a criticism of unpledged delegates. Superdelegates are only used by the Democratic Party. Political commentator Susan Estrich argued in 1981 that these delegates, who at the time were predominantly white and male, had more power than other delegates because of their greater freedom to vote as they wish. The Democratic Party in particular has faced accusations that it conducts its nominating process in an undemocratic way, because superdelegates are generally chosen without regard to their preferences in the presidential race and are not obligated to support the candidate chosen by the voters.

=== Advantage of incumbency ===
An incumbent president seeking re-election usually faces no opposition during their respective party's primaries, especially if they are still popular. For presidents Ronald Reagan, Bill Clinton, George W. Bush, Barack Obama and Donald Trump, for example, their respective paths to nomination became uneventful and the races become merely pro forma. With the lack of serious competition, the incumbent president's party may also cancel several state primaries/caucuses to both save money and to show undivided support for the incumbent's candidacy. Furthermore, no incumbent president has participated in a primary debate since Gerald Ford in 1976.

Serious challenges are rare, but then generally presage failure to win the general election in the fall. During the 1976 Republican Party primaries, then-former California governor Reagan carried 23 states while running against incumbent president Gerald Ford; Ford then went on to lose the presidential election to Jimmy Carter. Senator Ted Kennedy then carried 12 states while running against Carter during the 1980 Democratic Party primaries; Reagan then defeated Carter in the fall. Pat Buchanan captured a decent percentage of a protest vote against George H.W. Bush during the 1992 Republican primaries, but only received a handful of delegates; Bush too subsequently went on to lose in the general election to Clinton.

== Reform proposals ==
There are several proposals for reforming the primary system. Some have called for a single nationwide primary to be held on one day. Others point out that requiring candidates to campaign in every state simultaneously would exacerbate the purported problem of campaigns being dominated by the candidates who raise the most money. The following proposals attempt to return the primary system to a more relaxed schedule, and would help less-funded candidates by lowering the cost of entry.

=== California Plan (American Plan) ===
One reform concept is the graduated random presidential primary system, variations of which have been referred to as the American Plan or the California Plan. This plan starts with small primaries, and gradually moves up to larger ones, in 10 steps, with states chosen at random. The idea is that fewer initial primaries, typically in smaller states, would allow grassroots campaigns to score early successes and pick up steam. However, since states are chosen at random, travel costs may still be significant.

=== Delaware Plan (Fourfold Round Plan) ===
A commission empaneled by the Republican National Committee recommended the Delaware Plan in 2000. This plan had states grouped by size into four groups, with the smallest primaries first, then the next-smallest, and so on. Populous states objected to the plan, however, because it would have always scheduled their primaries at the end of the season. Other criticisms included the wide geographic range of the states, necessitating high travel costs. The Delaware Plan was put to vote at Republican National Convention of 2000 and rejected.

=== Rotating regional primary system ===
The National Association of Secretaries of State has endorsed a rotating regional primary system, with the country split into four regions: the West, the Midwest, the South, and the Northeast. Unlike the Delaware Plan and the American Plan, the Rotating Regional Primary System would lower campaigning costs by restricting groups of primaries to single, contiguous regions.

Author and political scientist Larry J. Sabato is also a proponent of this plan, but his proposal would have the order of regional primaries determined by lottery on January 1 of each presidential election year instead of on a rotating basis. In addition, his plan would allow for a few small population states, such as Iowa and New Hampshire, to hold their primaries in advance of the first region.

Criticisms of the regional plan include the higher entry costs than the other plans (since 1/4 of the country would vote in the first regional), and the political bias of certain regions (the South or the Northeast) unduly influencing the selection of a nominee.

=== Interregional primary plan ===
In the interregional primary plan, the country is divided into geographical regions. On each primary date from March to June, one state from each of six regions votes. Each election date would contain a wide variety of perspectives. The order of the states in each region is set by a lottery. In a 24-year cycle, every state would have a chance to be among the first primary states. The primary criticism of this plan is that travel costs would be quite high: in each round, candidates would essentially have to cover the entire country to campaign effectively. Contrary to most reform plans, this would reduce the ability of lesser-funded candidates to build up from small contests to large ones.

=== Timing adjustment ===
In the 2008 Republican primary, states that ran early primaries were punished by a reduction of 50% in the number of delegates they could send to the national convention. Extension of this idea would set timing tiers, under which states that ran earlier primaries would send proportionally fewer delegates to the national convention, and states that waited would get a higher proportional number of delegates to the convention. For example, the party allowed primaries before March 1 to send 40% of delegates; those during March could send 60%; those during April could send 80%; those during May could send 100%; and those during June could send 120%.

The effect of such a plan would be clumping of primaries at the beginning of each month. It would still allow states to determine the timing of their own primaries, while giving them some incentive to hold primaries later. The disadvantage of the timing adjustment method is that it does not reduce travel time as the regional plans do, although it does permit regional groups of states to voluntarily clump together in a single superprimary as they have done in the past.

In practice, however, this timing tier system did not prevent states from moving their primaries in 2008 and 2012. For example, during the 2012 Republican primary, Florida and several other states still moved their primaries to earlier dates despite being penalized delegates.

Both parties then enacted more severe penalties in 2016 for violating their timing rules. For Republicans, states with more than 30 delegates that violate the timing rules will be deprived of all their delegates but nine; states with less than 30 will be reduced to six. For Democrats, states violating these rules will be penalized half of their pledged delegates and all of their unpledged delegates.

== See also ==
- White primary

Lists of primaries by party

- Democratic Party presidential primaries
- Republican Party presidential primaries

Related topics

- Ames (Iowa) Straw Poll on a Saturday in August prior to the election year, from 1979 to 2011
- List of United States presidential candidates by number of primary votes received

== References and further reading ==
- Brereton Charles. First in the Nation: New Hampshire and the Premier Presidential Primary. Portsmouth, NH: Peter E. Randall Publishers, 1987.
- Cowan, Geoffrey. Let the People Rule: Theodore Roosevelt and the Birth of the Presidential Primary (WW Norton, 2016) on 1912
- Jeremias, Ralf. "Primary Elections in the USA: Between Republicanism and Democracy". Topos. Journal for Philosophy and Cultural Studies, 1/2021, pp. 55-72.
- Kendall, Kathleen E. Communication in the Presidential Primaries: Candidates and the Media, 1912–2000 (2000)
- Hugh, Gregg. "First-In-The-Nation Presidential Primary", State of New Hampshire Manual for the General Court, (Department of State) No.55, 1997.
- Palmer, Niall A. The New Hampshire Primary and the American Electoral Process (1997)
- "Reid, labor aided Nevada with Demos", Arizona Daily Star, July 24, 2006.
- Sabato, Larry, Politics: America's Missing Constitutional Link, Virginia Quarterly Review, Summer 2006, 149–61.
- Scala, Dante J. Stormy Weather: The New Hampshire Primary and Presidential Politics (2003)
- Ware, Alan. The American Direct Primary: Party Institutionalization and Transformation in the North (2002), a British perspective
