= Kay Orr =

American politician (born 1939)

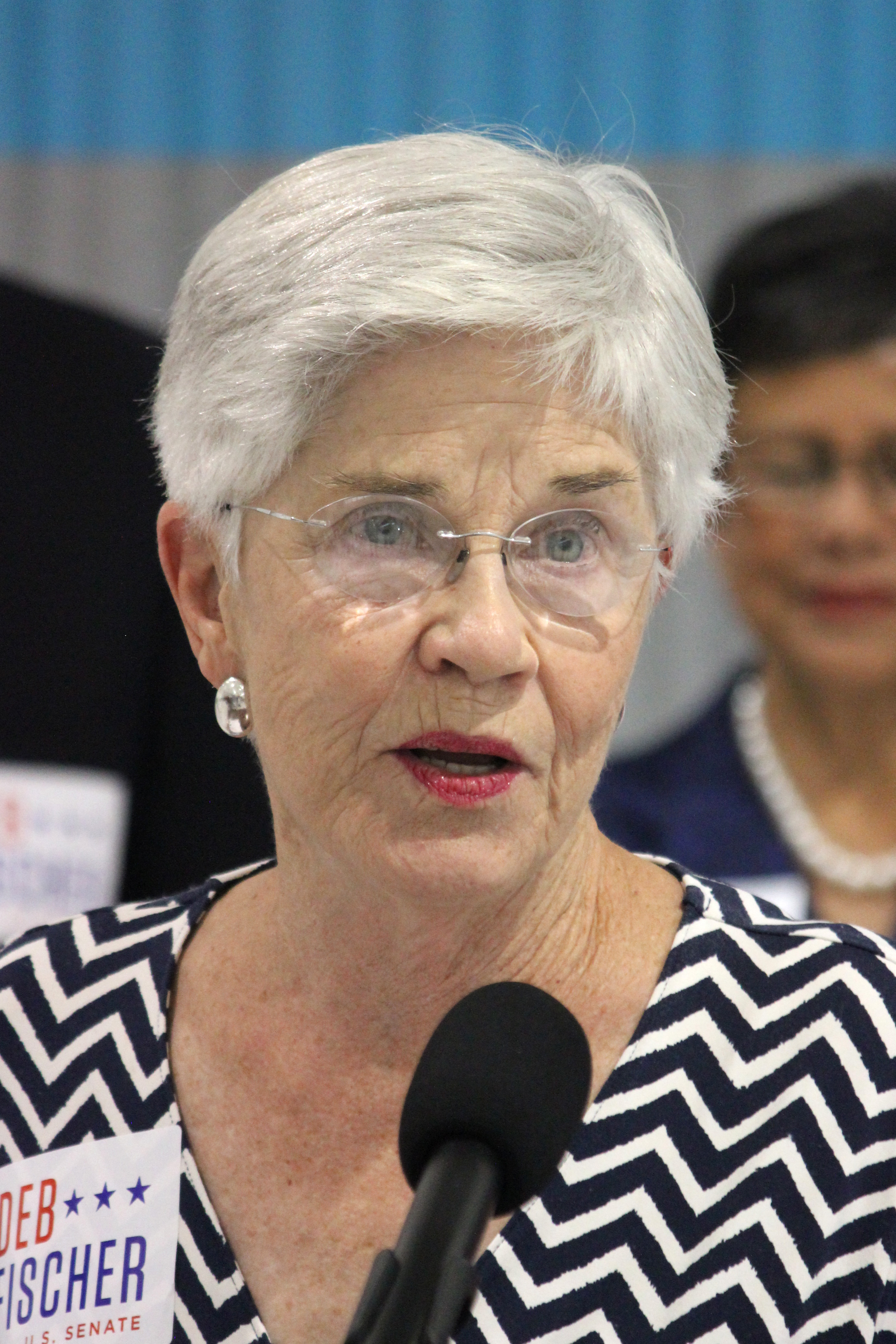
- Orr in 2017

36th Governor of Nebraska
- In office January 9, 1987 – January 9, 1991
- Lieutenant: William E. Nichol
- Preceded by: Bob Kerrey
- Succeeded by: Ben Nelson

35th Treasurer of Nebraska
- In office June 15, 1981 – January 9, 1987
- Governor: Charles Thone; Bob Kerrey
- Preceded by: Frank Marsh
- Succeeded by: Frank Marsh

Personal details
- Born: Kay Avonne Stark; January 2, 1939 (age 87) Burlington, Iowa, U.S.
- Party: Republican
- Spouse: Bill Orr (m. 1957; died 2013)
- Children: 2
- Education: University of Iowa (attended)

Kay Avonne Orr (née Stark; born January 2, 1939) is an American politician who served as the 36th governor of Nebraska from 1987 to 1991. A member of the Republican Party, she was the state's first and, as of 2026, only female governor.

== Early life and education ==
Orr was born Kay Avonne Stark in Burlington, Iowa. Her mother, Sadie, was active in local politics, while her father, Ralph, was a Burlington city council member and farm-implement dealer. She attended the University of Iowa from 1956 to 1957.

== Career ==
In 1963, after moving to Lincoln, Nebraska, Orr began volunteering for the Republican Party. She supported such politicians as President Richard Nixon and Senators Carl Curtis and Roman Hruska, and was named Nebraska's Outstanding Young Republican Woman in 1969.

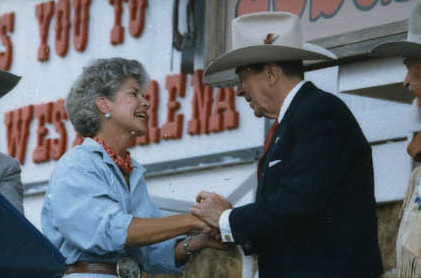
Orr greeting President Ronald Reagan in 1987

Orr was appointed as Nebraska State Treasurer following the midterm resignation of Frank Marsh in 1981. She was subsequently elected to that post in 1982, becoming the first woman ever to be elected to a statewide constitutional office in Nebraska. She held that office until 1987.

=== Governor of Nebraska ===
In the 1986 election, Orr secured the Republican nomination for Nebraska governor after winning an eight-way primary, carrying 81 of Nebraska's 93 counties including Douglas and Lancaster, Kermit Brashear carried 9 counties, and Nancy Hoch carried 2 counties.

In the 1986 general election, she defeated former Lincoln Mayor Helen Boosalis in the first U.S. gubernatorial election in which both major-party candidates were women, winning by a 53% to 47% margin. Orr was the first Republican woman elected governor in the United States, and the second Republican woman governor after Vesta M. Roy, who served as the unelected acting governor of New Hampshire from December 1982 to January 1983.

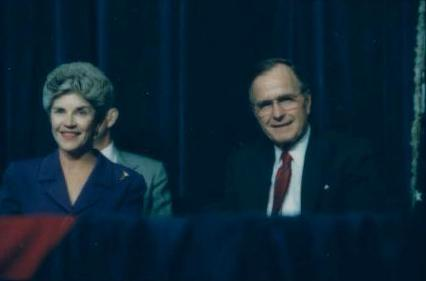
Orr with President George H. W. Bush in 1990

In the 1990 gubernatorial election, Orr was narrowly defeated by Democrat Ben Nelson. Nelson's two main attacks on her gubernatorial record were her support of a proposed low-level nuclear waste dump, and a tax increase which was passed over her veto.

==== Politics ====
As governor, Orr was against tax increases, against the Equal Rights Amendment, and opposed abortions in all cases.

=== Later career ===
Orr co-chaired a coalition seeking to prohibit gay marriage in the state constitution via Initiative 416. The effort was successful, and gay marriage was banned in 2000. In 2015, the Obergefell v. Hodges Supreme Court ruling rendered the ban unenforceable.

Orr served twice as a presidential elector for the state of Nebraska, casting one of the state's five electoral votes. In the 2004 presidential election, she voted for George W. Bush, and in the 2012 election, for Mitt Romney.

== Personal life ==
She married Bill Orr on September 26, 1957, and they had two children, John William and Suzanne. Bill Orr died from complications of COPD on May 5, 2013.

== See also ==
- List of female governors in the United States

Party political offices
Preceded by Frank Marsh	Republican nominee for Treasurer of Nebraska; 1982	Succeeded by Frank Marsh
Preceded by Charles Thone	Republican nominee for Governor of Nebraska; 1986, 1990	Succeeded by Gene Spence
Political offices
Preceded by Frank Marsh	Treasurer of Nebraska; 1981–1987	Succeeded by Frank Marsh
Preceded by Bob Kerrey	Governor of Nebraska; 1987–1991	Succeeded by Ben Nelson
U.S. order of precedence (ceremonial)
Preceded by Martha McSally as Former U.S. Senator	Order of precedence of the United States; Within Nebraska	Succeeded by Dave Heineman as Former Governor
Preceded by Steve Sisolak as Former Governor	Order of precedence of the United States; Outside Nebraska	Succeeded by Dave Heineman as Former Governor
