= Frank Marsh (politician) =

29th Lieutenant Governor of Nebraska

34th Treasurer of Nebraska
- In office January 9, 1987 – January 9, 1991
- Governor: Kay Orr
- Preceded by: Kay Orr
- Succeeded by: Dawn Rockey
- In office January 9, 1975 – 1981
- Governor: J. James Exon; Charles Thone
- Preceded by: Wayne Swanson
- Succeeded by: Kay Orr

29th Lieutenant Governor of Nebraska
- In office January 7, 1971 – January 9, 1975
- Governor: J. James Exon
- Preceded by: John Everroad
- Succeeded by: Gerald Whelan

23rd Secretary of State of Nebraska
- In office January 8, 1953 – January 7, 1971
- Governor: Robert B. Crosby; Victor Anderson; Ralph G. Brooks; Dwight Burney; Frank B. Morrison; Norbert Tiemann
- Preceded by: James S. Pittenger
- Succeeded by: Allen Beermann

Personal details
- Born: April 27, 1924 Norfolk, Nebraska, U.S.
- Died: March 10, 2001 (aged 76) Lincoln, Nebraska, U.S.
- Party: Republican
- Spouse: Shirley McVicker Marsh
- Parent: Frank Marsh Sr. (father)

Frank Marsh (April 27, 1924 – March 10, 2001) was an American politician who served as the 29th lieutenant governor of Nebraska from 1971 to 1975. A member of the Republican Party, he also held the offices of Nebraska Secretary of State and Nebraska State Treasurer.

== Biography ==
Frank Marsh in 1952 after being elected Secretary of State

Frank Marsh was born in Norfolk, Nebraska on April 27, 1924. He served in the United States Army in World War II. Marsh received his bachelor's degree from University of Nebraska and was a contractor who also taught in the Lincoln Public School system.

Marsh's father, Frank Marsh Sr. (1881–1951), served twice as Secretary of State of Nebraska (1927–1933; 1941–1951). The younger Marsh was elected to the same office in late 1952 and served in that position for eighteen years. In November 1970, Marsh was elected Lieutenant Governor of Nebraska, taking office in 1971 and serving until 1975 under Democratic Governor J. James Exon. Afterwards, he served twice as Nebraska State Treasurer: from 1975 until his resignation in 1981 (to become state director of the U.S. Farmers Home Administration) and again from 1987 to 1991.

In 1991, Marsh was convicted of misdemeanor charges for making personal, long-distance telephone calls with government phones. In 1990, he was defeated by Dawn Rockey.

He married Shirley McVicker in 1943, who served in the Nebraska Legislature. Marsh died in Lincoln on March 10, 2001. Frank Marsh had six children and nine grandchildren.

Party political offices
Preceded by Frank Marsh Sr	Republican nominee for Secretary of State of Nebraska; 1952, 1954, 1956, 1958, 1960, 1962, 1964, 1966	Succeeded by Allen Beermann
Preceded by John Everroad	Republican nominee for Lieutenant Governor of Nebraska; 1970	Succeeded by Anne Stuart Batchelder
Preceded by Wayne Swanson	Republican nominee for Nebraska State Treasurer; 1974, 1978	Succeeded by Kay Orr
Preceded by Kay Orr	Republican nominee for Nebraska State Treasurer; 1986, 1990	Succeeded by Dave Heineman
Political offices
Preceded by James S. Pittenger	Secretary of State of Nebraska; 1953–1971	Succeeded by Allen Beermann
Preceded by John Everroad	Lieutenant Governor of Nebraska; 1971–1975	Succeeded by Gerald Whelan
Preceded by Wayne Swanson; Kay Orr	Treasurer of Nebraska; 1975–1981; 1987–1991	Succeeded by Kay Orr; Dawn Rockey
