= Shirley Marsh =

American politician

Shirley Mac McVicker Marsh

Member of the Nebraska Legislature from the district
- In office 1973–1989

Personal details
- Born: June 22, 1925 Benton, Illinois, U.S.
- Died: June 8, 2014 (aged 88) Lincoln, Nebraska, U.S
- Children: 6
- Occupation: member of the Nebraska State Legislature

Shirley Mac McVicker Marsh (June 22, 1925 – June 8, 2014) was an American politician and social worker.

== Biography ==
Born in Benton, Illinois, Marsh received her bachelor's and master's degrees from University of Nebraska in social welfare. Her husband was Frank Marsh who served as Lieutenant Governor of Nebraska from 1971 to 1975 and lived in Lincoln, Nebraska where she had graduated from Lincoln High School. She was a member of the Republican Party and was elected to the Nebraska State Legislature in 1973. Marsh died in Lincoln, Nebraska.
