= 1852 United States presidential election in New Hampshire =

- November 2, 1852

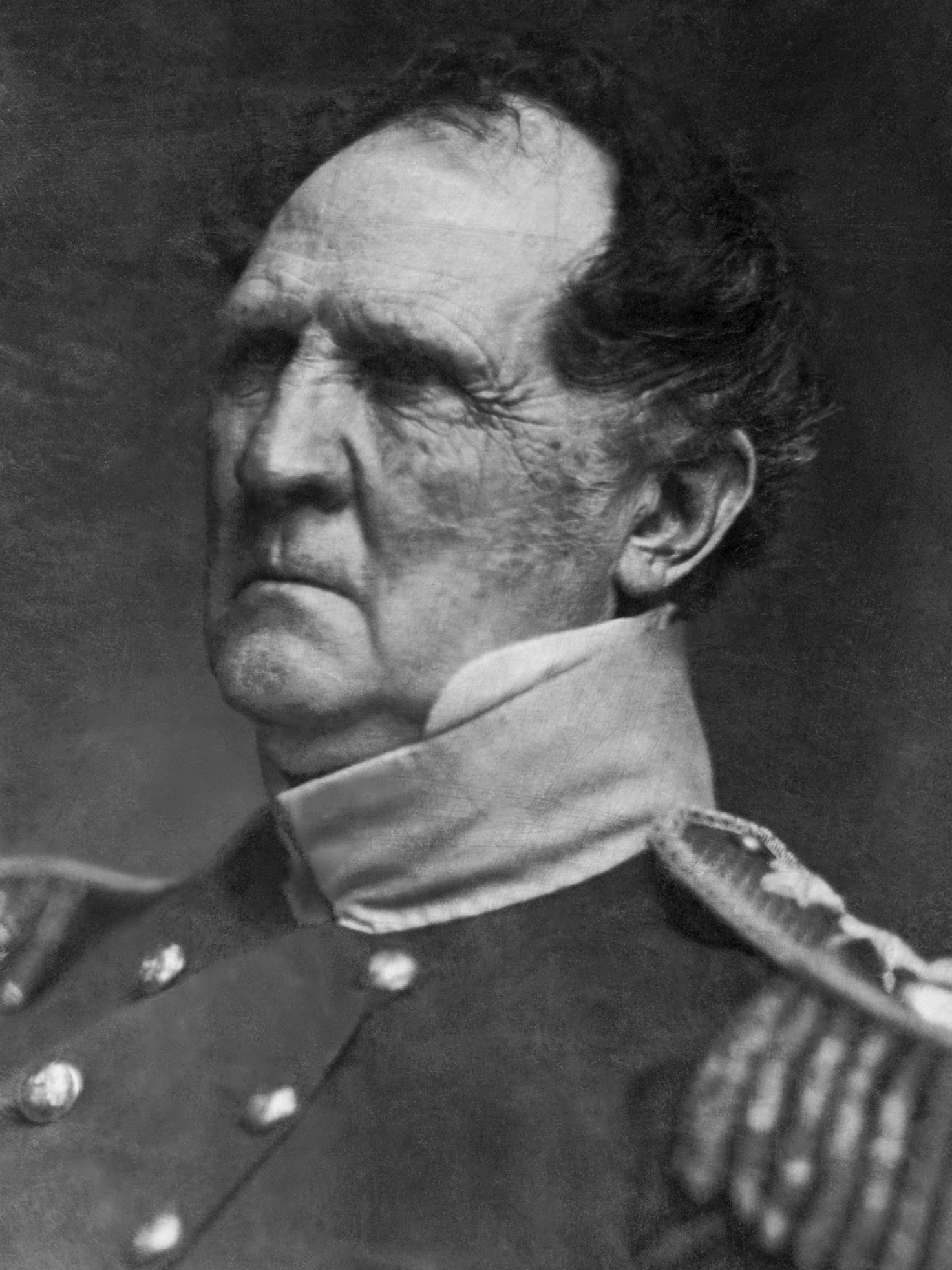

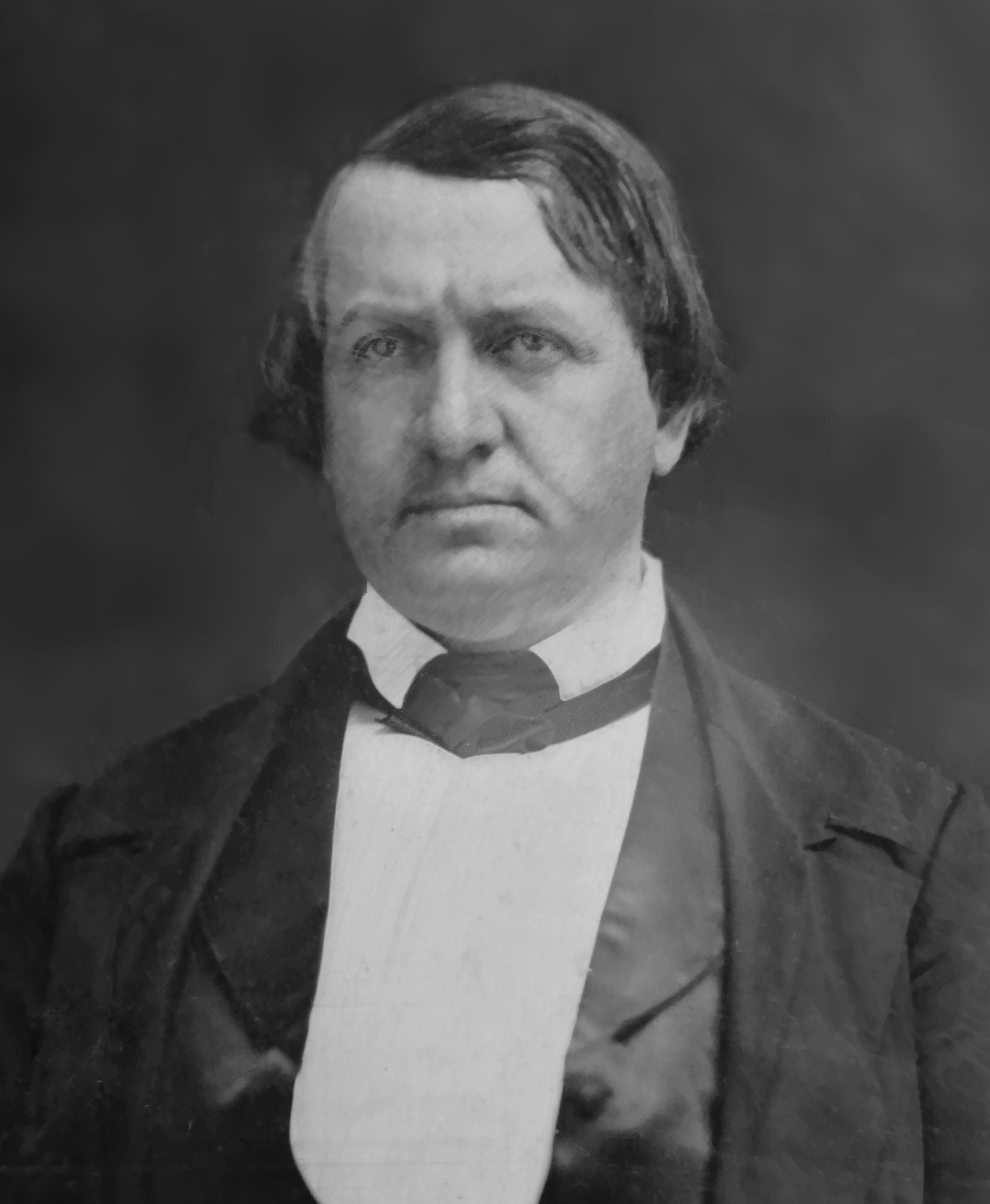
Nominee	Franklin Pierce	Winfield Scott	John P. Hale
Party	Democratic	Whig	Free Soil
Home state	New Hampshire	New Jersey	New Hampshire
Running mate	William R. King	William Alexander Graham	George W. Julian
Electoral vote	5	0	0
Popular vote	28,503	15,486	6,546
Percentage	56.40%	30.64%	12.95%
County results
Pierce
40–50%
50–60%
60–70%
President before election
Millard Fillmore
Whig
Elected President
Franklin Pierce
Democratic

The 1852 United States presidential election in New Hampshire took place on November 2, 1852, as part of the 1852 United States presidential election. Voters chose five representatives, or electors to the Electoral College, who voted for President and Vice President.

New Hampshire voted for the Democratic candidate, Franklin Pierce, over the Whig Party candidate, Winfield Scott. Pierce won his home state by a margin of 25.76%. His margin of victory in New Hampshire is the second largest for a Democrat, surpassed only by Lyndon B. Johnson's 27.78% in 1964.

Both Pierce and Free Soil Party candidate John P. Hale were from New Hampshire. Pierce had been born in Hillsborough while Hale was born in Rochester.

This would be the last election when New Hampshire voted for the Democratic Party until Woodrow Wilson won it in 1912 with a narrow plurality, as the anti-slavery Republican Party would monopolize the state at a presidential level between 1856 and 1908. It was to also be the last election that a Democrat won a majority of the vote in the state until Franklin D. Roosevelt in 1940.

This would also be the last time a Democrat would carry every single county until Barack Obama in 2008, and the second to last time overall.

== Results ==
1852 United States presidential election in New Hampshire
Party	Candidate	Votes	Percentage	Electoral votes
Democratic	Franklin Pierce	28,503	56.40%	5
Whig	Winfield Scott	15,486	30.64%	0
Free Soil	John P. Hale	6,546	12.95%	0
Totals		50,535	100%	5

== See also ==
- United States presidential elections in New Hampshire
