= 1940 United States presidential election in New Hampshire =

- November 5, 1940

Nominee	Franklin D. Roosevelt	Wendell Willkie
Party	Democratic	Republican
Home state	New York	New York
Running mate	Henry A. Wallace	Charles L. McNary
Electoral vote	4	0
Popular vote	125,292	110,127
Percentage	53.22%	46.78%

Roosevelt
50–60%
60–70%
70–80%
80–90%
Willkie
50–60%
60–70%
70–80%
80–90%
90–100%
Tie
50%
President before election
Franklin D. Roosevelt
Democratic
Elected President
Franklin D. Roosevelt
Democratic

The 1940 United States presidential election in New Hampshire took place on November 5, 1940. All contemporary 48 states were part of the 1940 United States presidential election. State voters chose four electors to the Electoral College, which selected the president and vice president.

New Hampshire was won by incumbent Democratic President Franklin D. Roosevelt of New York, who was running against Republican businessman Wendell Willkie of New York. Roosevelt ran with Henry A. Wallace of Iowa as his running mate, and Willkie ran with Senator Charles L. McNary of Oregon.

Roosevelt won New Hampshire by 6.44%, at the time the best performance by a Democratic presidential candidate in this traditionally Republican state since the latter party was founded and the first time since Franklin Pierce in 1852 that a Democrat won the state with an absolute majority of the vote. It had previously been won with a plurality by Roosevelt four years earlier and by Woodrow Wilson in 1912 and 1916.

Roosevelt's gain in New Hampshire and other New England states, in an election when Willkie carried almost 700 counties that the President had won during his landslide four years beforehand, was due to support in the region for helping Britain and France during World War II. New Hampshire was one of five states that shifted left from 1936, alongside Maine, North Carolina, Rhode Island, and Vermont.

== Results ==
1940 United States presidential election in New Hampshire
Party	Candidate	Running mate	Popular vote		Electoral vote	
Party	Candidate	Running mate	Count	%	Count	%
Democratic	Franklin Delano Roosevelt of New York	Henry Agard Wallace of Iowa	125,292	53.22%	4	100.00%
Republican	Wendell Willkie of New York	Charles Linza McNary of Oregon	110,127	46.78%	0	0.00%
Total			235,419	100.00%	4	100.00%

=== Results by county ===
County	Franklin Delano Roosevelt Democratic		Wendell Lewis Willkie Republican		Margin		Total votes cast
County	#	%	#	%	#	%	Total votes cast
Belknap	5,653	48.04%	6,115	51.96%	-462	-3.93%	11,768
Carroll	2,870	33.66%	5,656	66.34%	-2,786	-32.68%	8,526
Cheshire	6,916	45.45%	8,302	54.55%	-1,386	-9.11%	15,218
Coös	10,100	60.30%	6,650	39.70%	3,450	20.60%	16,750
Grafton	9,761	45.96%	11,478	54.04%	-1,717	-8.08%	21,239
Hillsborough	42,580	61.91%	26,201	38.09%	16,379	23.81%	68,781
Merrimack	14,692	49.61%	14,923	50.39%	-231	-0.78%	29,615
Rockingham	14,001	46.32%	16,223	53.68%	-2,222	-7.35%	30,224
Strafford	12,847	58.82%	8,996	41.18%	3,851	17.63%	21,843
Sullivan	5,872	51.26%	5,583	48.74%	289	2.52%	11,455
Totals	125,292	53.22%	110,127	46.78%	15,165	6.44%	235,419

==== Counties that flipped from Republican to Democratic ====
- Sullivan

== See also ==
- United States presidential elections in New Hampshire
