= 1840 United States presidential election in New Hampshire =

- November 2, 1840
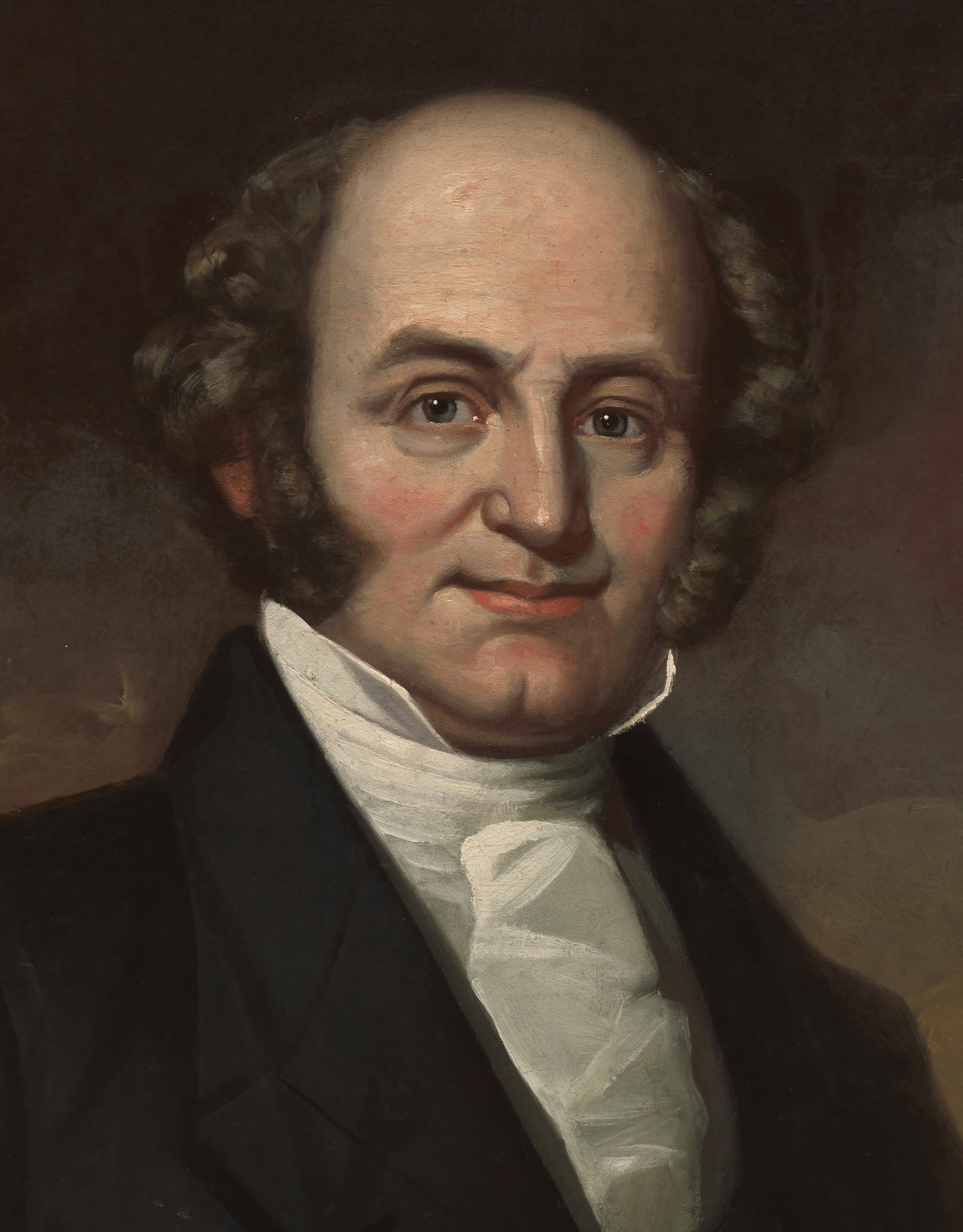

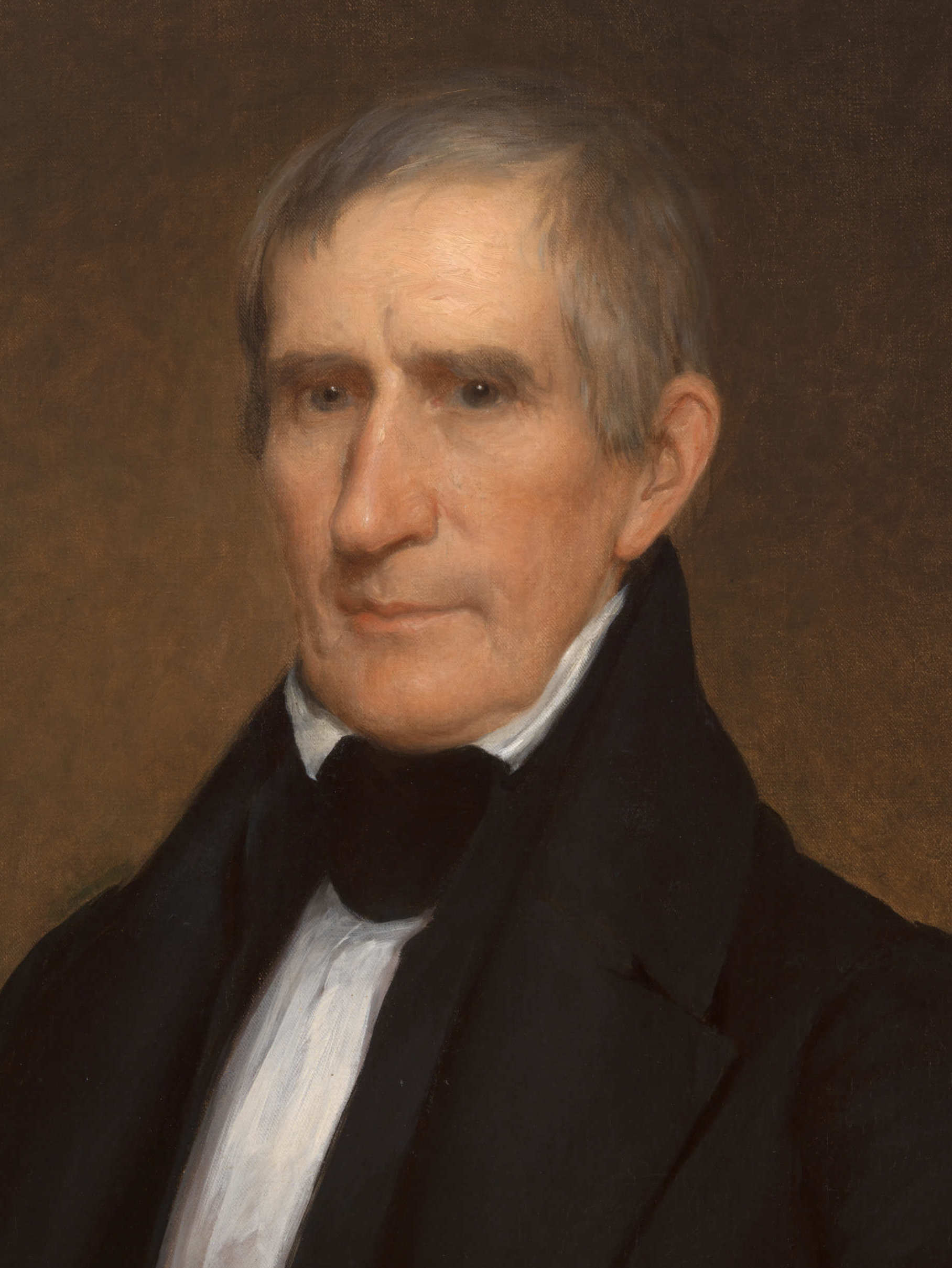
| Nominee | Martin Van Buren | William Henry Harrison |
| Party | Democratic | Whig |
| Home state | New York | Ohio |
| Running mate | none | John Tyler |
| Electoral vote | 7 | 0 |
| Popular vote | 32,774 | 26,310 |
| Percentage | 54.66% | 43.88% |
County results
Van Buren
50–60%
60–70%
70–80%
Harrison
50–60%
60–70%
President before election
Martin Van Buren
Democratic
Elected President
William Henry Harrison
Whig

A presidential election was held in New Hampshire on November 2, 1840 as part of the 1840 United States presidential election. Voters chose seven representatives, or electors to the Electoral College, who voted for President and Vice President.

New Hampshire voted for the Democratic candidate, Martin Van Buren, over Whig candidate William Henry Harrison. Van Buren won New Hampshire by a margin of 10.78%.

== Results ==
1840 United States presidential election in New Hampshire
| Party | Candidate | Running mate | Popular vote | | Electoral vote | |
| Party | Candidate | Running mate | Count | % | Count | % |
|---|---|---|---|---|---|---|
| Democratic | Martin Van Buren of New York | Richard Mentor Johnson of Kentucky | 32,774 | 54.66% | 7 | 100.00% |
| Whig | William Henry Harrison of Ohio | John Tyler of Virginia | 26,310 | 43.88% | 0 | 0.00% |
| Liberty | James G. Birney of New York | Thomas Earle of Pennsylvania | 872 | 1.45% | 0 | 0.00% |
| Total | | | 59,956 | 100.00% | 7 | 100.00% |

== See also ==
- United States presidential elections in New Hampshire
