= 1844 United States presidential election in New Hampshire =

- November 4, 1844

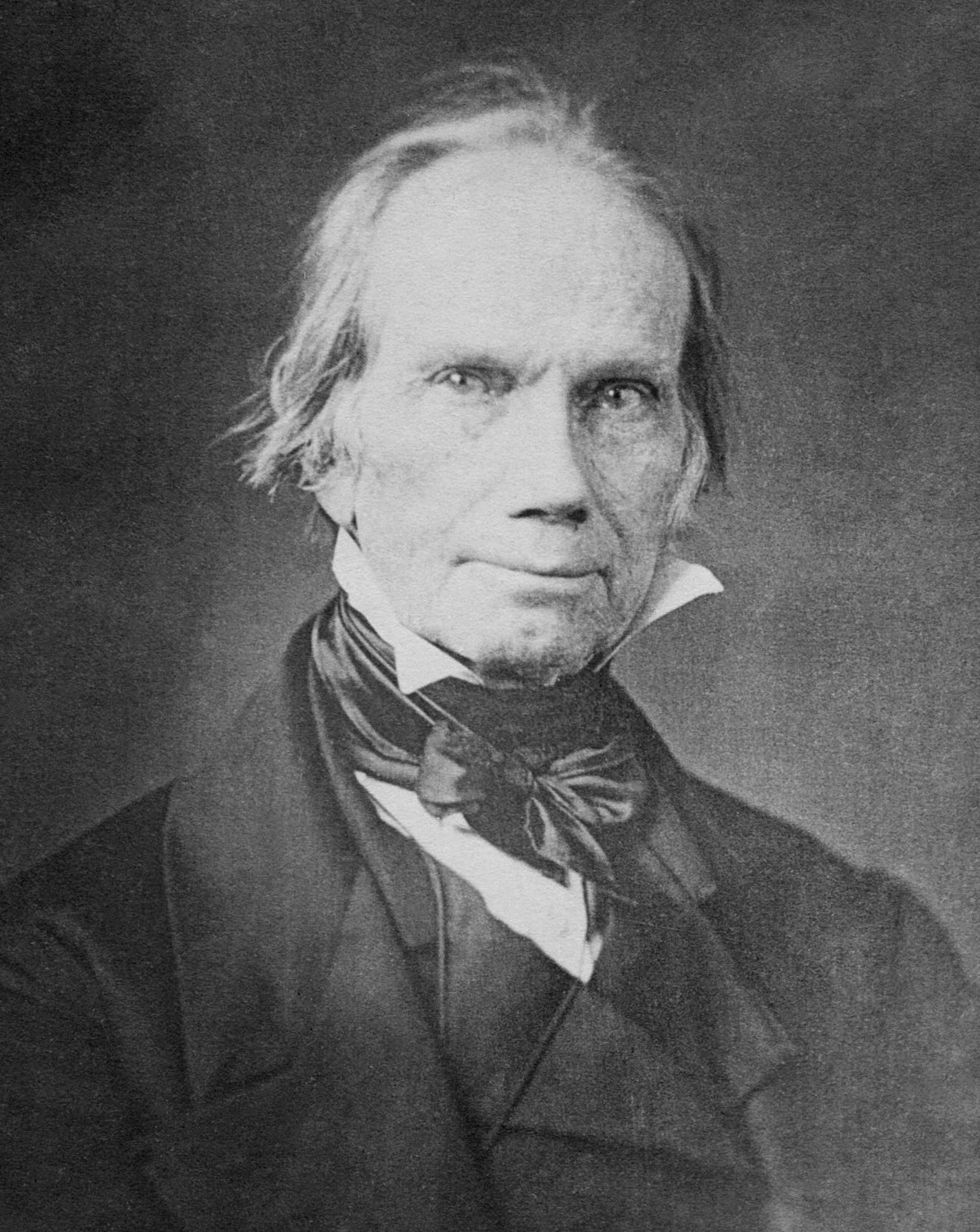

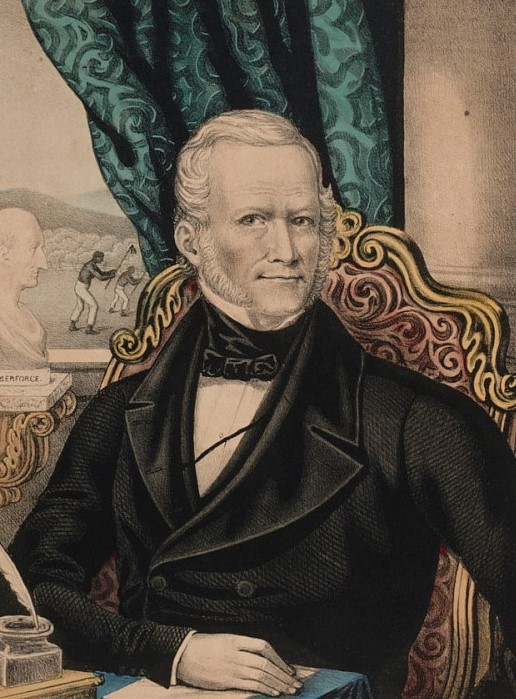
Nominee	James K. Polk	Henry Clay	James G. Birney
Party	Democratic	Whig	Liberty
Home state	Tennessee	Kentucky	Michigan
Running mate	George M. Dallas	Theodore Frelinghuysen	Thomas Morris
Electoral vote	6	0	0
Popular vote	27,160	17,866	4,161
Percentage	55.22%	36.32%	8.46%
County results
Polk
50–60%
60–70%
70–80%
80–90%
Clay
40–50%
President before election
John Tyler
Independent
Elected President
James K. Polk
Democratic

A presidential election was held in New Hampshire on November 4, 1844 as part of the 1844 United States presidential election. Voters chose six representatives, or electors to the Electoral College, who voted for President and Vice President.

New Hampshire voted for the Democratic candidate, James K. Polk, over Whig candidate Henry Clay and Liberty candidate James G. Birney. Polk won New Hampshire by a margin of 18.9%.

With 8.46% of the popular vote, New Hampshire would prove to be James G. Birney's strongest state.

== Results ==
1844 United States presidential election in New Hampshire
Party	Candidate	Running mate	Popular vote		Electoral vote	
Party	Candidate	Running mate	Count	%	Count	%
Democratic	James K. Polk of Tennessee	George M. Dallas of Pennsylvania	27,160	55.22%	6	100.00%
Whig	Henry Clay of Kentucky	Theodore Frelinghuysen of New York	17,866	36.32%	0	0.00%
Liberty	James G. Birney of Michigan	Thomas Morris of Ohio	4,161	8.46%	0	0.00%
Total			49,187	100.00%	6	100.00%

== See also ==
- United States presidential elections in New Hampshire
