= 1940 United States presidential election in Rhode Island =

- November 5, 1940

Nominee	Franklin D. Roosevelt	Wendell Willkie
Party	Democratic	Republican
Home state	New York	New York
Running mate	Henry A. Wallace	Charles L. McNary
Electoral vote	4	0
Popular vote	182,182	138,653
Percentage	56.73%	43.17%

Roosevelt
50–60%
60–70%
70–80%
Willkie
50–60%
60–70%
70–80%
80–90%
President before election
Franklin D. Roosevelt
Democratic
Elected President
Franklin D. Roosevelt
Democratic

The 1940 United States presidential election in Rhode Island took place on November 5, 1940. All contemporary 48 states were part of the 1940 United States presidential election. State voters chose four electors to the Electoral College, which selected the president and vice president.

Rhode Island was won by incumbent Democratic President Franklin D. Roosevelt of New York, who was running against Republican businessman Wendell Willkie of New York. Roosevelt ran with former Secretary of Agriculture Henry A. Wallace of Iowa as his running mate, and Willkie ran with Senator Charles L. McNary of Oregon.

Roosevelt won Rhode Island by a margin of 13.56%. The state became one of five that shifted left from 1936, alongside Maine, New Hampshire, North Carolina, and Vermont.

== Results ==
1940 United States presidential election in Rhode Island
Party	Candidate	Running mate	Popular vote		Electoral vote	
Party	Candidate	Running mate	Count	%	Count	%
Democratic	Franklin Delano Roosevelt of New York	Henry Agard Wallace of Iowa	182,182	56.73%	4	100.00%
Republican	Wendell Willkie of New York	Charles Linza McNary of Oregon	138,653	43.27%	0	0.00%
Communist	Earl Russell Browder of Kansas	James W. Ford of New York	239	0.07%	0	0.00%
Prohibition	Roger Ward Babson of Massachusetts	Edgar Moorman of Illinois	74	0.02%	0	0.00%
Total			321,148	100.00%	4	100.00%

=== By county ===
1940 United States presidential election in Rhode Island (by county)
County	Franklin D. Roosevelt Democratic		Wendell Willkie Republican		Other candidates Various parties		Margin		Total
County	%	#	%	#	%	#	%	#	#
Bristol	52.9%	5,967	47.1%	5,314	0.03%	3	5.8%	653	11,284
Kent	49.2%	14,333	50.7%	14,790	0.1%	28	-1.5%	-457	29,151
Newport	51.8%	10,645	48.1%	9,882	0.1%	14	3.7%	763	20,541
Providence	59.3%	145,236	40.6%	99,434	0.1%	251	18.7%	45,802	244,921
Washington	39.3%	6,001	60.5%	9,233	0.1%	17	-21.2%	-3,232	15,251

== See also ==
- United States presidential elections in Rhode Island
