= 1836 United States presidential election in New Hampshire =

- November 7, 1836
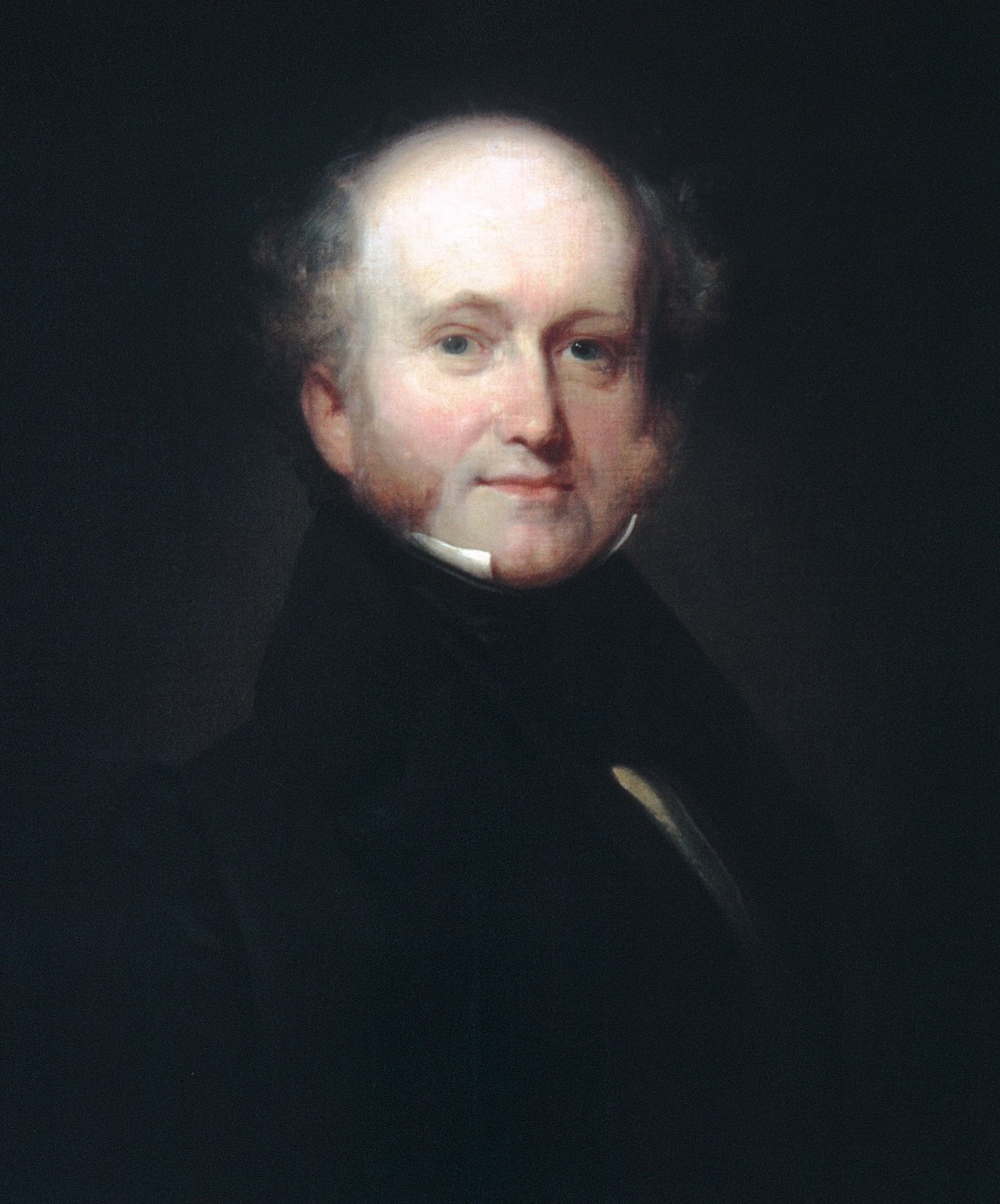

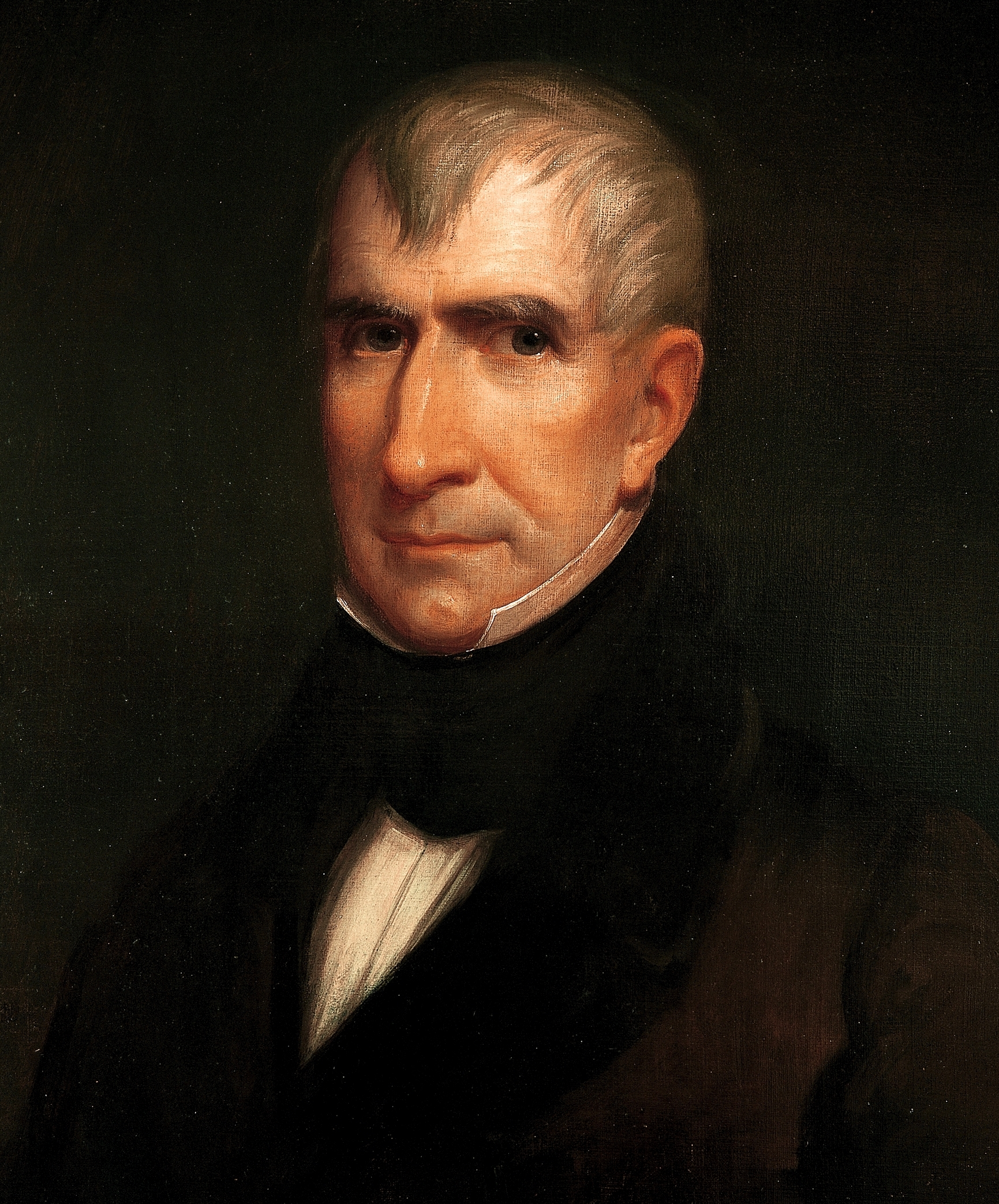
Nominee	Martin Van Buren	William Henry Harrison
Party	Democratic	Whig
Home state	New York	Ohio
Running mate	Richard Mentor Johnson	Francis Granger
Electoral vote	7	0
Popular vote	18,697	6,228
Percentage	75.01%	24.99%
County results
Van Buren
50–60%
60–70%
70–80%
80–90%
President before election
Andrew Jackson
Democratic
Elected President
Martin Van Buren
Democratic

A presidential election was held in New Hampshire on November 7, 1836 as part of the 1836 United States presidential election. Voters chose seven representatives, or electors to the Electoral College, who voted for President and Vice President.

New Hampshire voted for the Democratic candidate, Martin Van Buren, over Whig candidate William Henry Harrison. Van Buren won New Hampshire by a margin of 50.02%. As of 2025, this remains the strongest ever performance by any presidential candidate in New Hampshire since the creation of the modern Democratic party in 1828.

== Results ==
1836 United States presidential election in New Hampshire
Party	Candidate	Running mate	Popular vote		Electoral vote	
Party	Candidate	Running mate	Count	%	Count	%
Democratic	Martin Van Buren of New York	Richard Mentor Johnson of Kentucky	18,697	75.01%	7	100.00%
Whig	William Henry Harrison of Ohio	Francis Granger of New York	6,228	24.99%	0	0.00%
Total			24,925	100.00%	7	100.00%

== See also ==
- United States presidential elections in New Hampshire
