= 1892 United States presidential election in New Hampshire =

- November 8, 1892
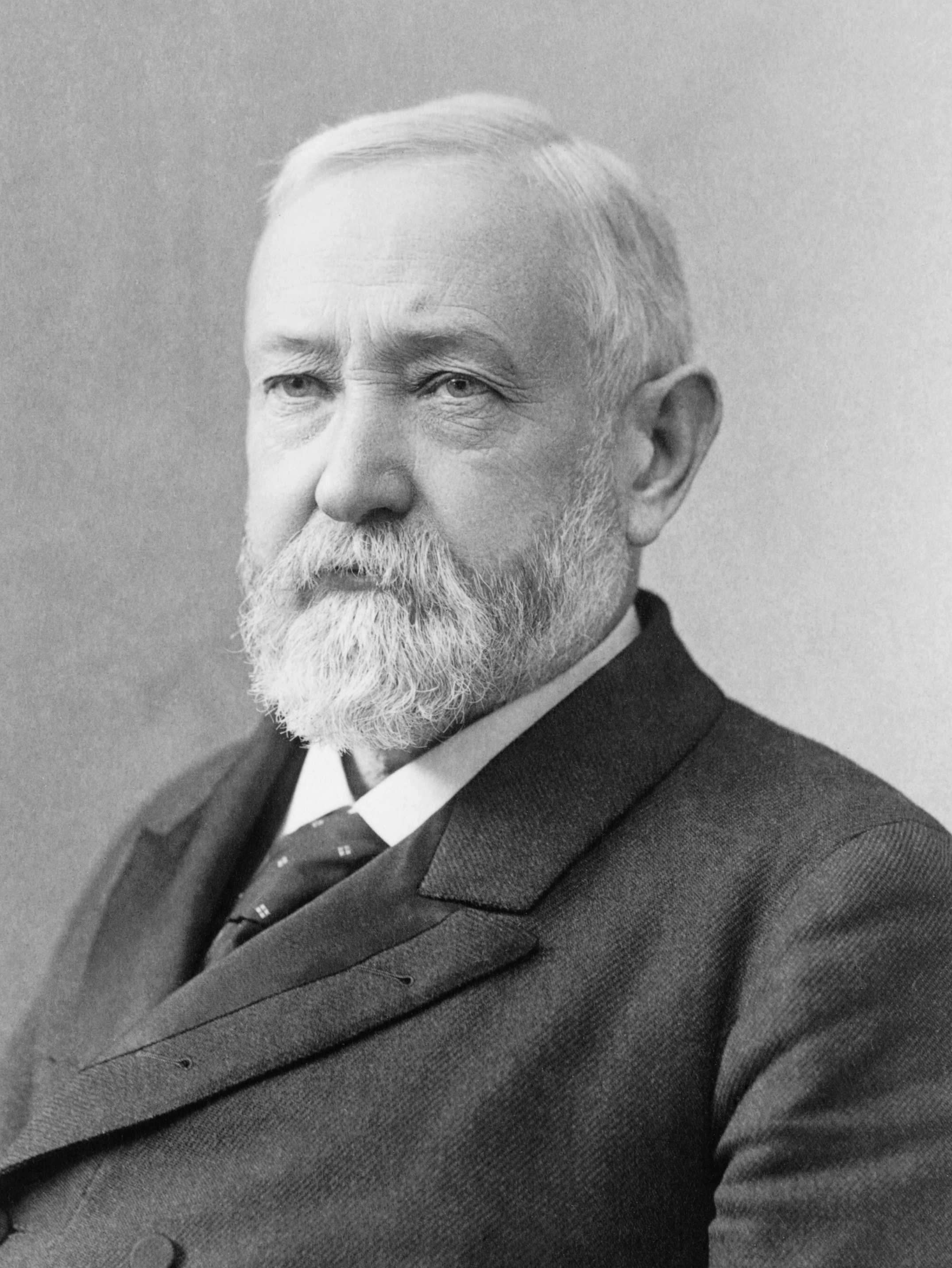

Nominee	Benjamin Harrison	Grover Cleveland
Party	Republican	Democratic
Home state	Indiana	New York
Running mate	Whitelaw Reid	Adlai Stevenson I
Electoral vote	4	0
Popular vote	45,658	42,081
Percentage	51.11%	47.11%

Harrison
40–50%
50–60%
60–70%
70–80%
80–90%
Cleveland
40–50%
50–60%
60–70%
70–80%
80–90%
President before election
Benjamin Harrison
Republican
Elected President
Grover Cleveland
Democratic

The 1892 United States presidential election in New Hampshire took place on November 8, 1892, as part of the 1892 United States presidential election. Voters chose four representatives, or electors to the Electoral College, who voted for president and vice president.

New Hampshire voted for the Republican nominee, incumbent President Benjamin Harrison, over the Democratic nominee, former President Grover Cleveland, who was running for a second, non-consecutive term. Harrison won New Hampshire by a narrow margin of exactly 4%. This would be typical of the 1876 to 1892 period, but the state would turn much more Republican in subsequent elections: Cleveland's victories in Carroll and Coös Counties would be the last time a Democrat won those two or any county in the state until 1912.

With 51.11% of the popular vote, New Hampshire would prove to be Harrison's fifth strongest victory in terms of percentage in the popular vote after neighboring Vermont, Maine, Massachusetts and Pennsylvania. New Hampshire would also be one of four states which Harrison improved in from 1888, the others were Delaware, Georgia and, South Carolina.

This would prove one of only two times in its history that a president was elected to a second full term without carrying New Hampshire either time (the other being James Madison in 1812 after also losing the state in 1808).

== Results ==
1892 United States presidential election in New Hampshire
Party	Candidate	Running mate	Popular vote		Electoral vote	
Party	Candidate	Running mate	Count	%	Count	%
Republican	Benjamin Harrison of Indiana (incumbent)	Whitelaw Reid of New York	45,658	51.11%	4	100.00%
Democratic	Grover Cleveland of New York	Adlai Stevenson I of Illinois	42,081	47.11%	0	0.00%
Prohibition	John Bidwell of California	James B. Cranfill of Texas	1,297	1.45%	0	0.00%
Populist	James B. Weaver of Iowa	James G. Field of Virginia	293	0.33%	0	0.00%
Total			89,325	100.00%	4	100.00%

=== Results by county ===
County	Benjamin Harrison Republican		Grover Cleveland Democratic		John Bidwell Prohibition		James B. Weaver People's		Total votes cast
County	#	%	#	%	#	%	#	%	Total votes cast
Belknap	2,663	50.56%	2,472	46.93%	123	2.34%	9	0.17%	5,267
Carroll	2,253	48.82%	2,267	49.12%	89	1.93%	6	0.13%	4,615
Cheshire	4,024	56.34%	2,994	41.92%	100	1.40%	24	0.34%	7,142
Coös	2,419	47.36%	2,639	51.66%	30	0.59%	20	0.39%	5,108
Grafton	4,828	49.25%	4,794	48.90%	155	1.58%	27	0.28%	9,804
Hillsborough	9,875	52.08%	8,785	46.33%	215	1.13%	88	0.46%	18,963
Merrimack	6,116	49.69%	5,919	48.09%	251	2.04%	23	0.19%	12,309
Rockingham	6,380	50.75%	5,961	47.42%	168	1.34%	62	0.49%	12,571
Strafford	4,666	51.68%	4,229	46.84%	108	1.20%	26	0.29%	9,029
Sullivan	2,434	53.84%	2,021	44.70%	58	1.28%	8	0.18%	4,521
Totals	45,658	51.11%	42,081	47.11%	1,297	1.45%	293	0.33%	89,329

== See also ==
- United States presidential elections in New Hampshire
