= 1828 United States presidential election in New Hampshire =

- October 31 – December 2, 1828
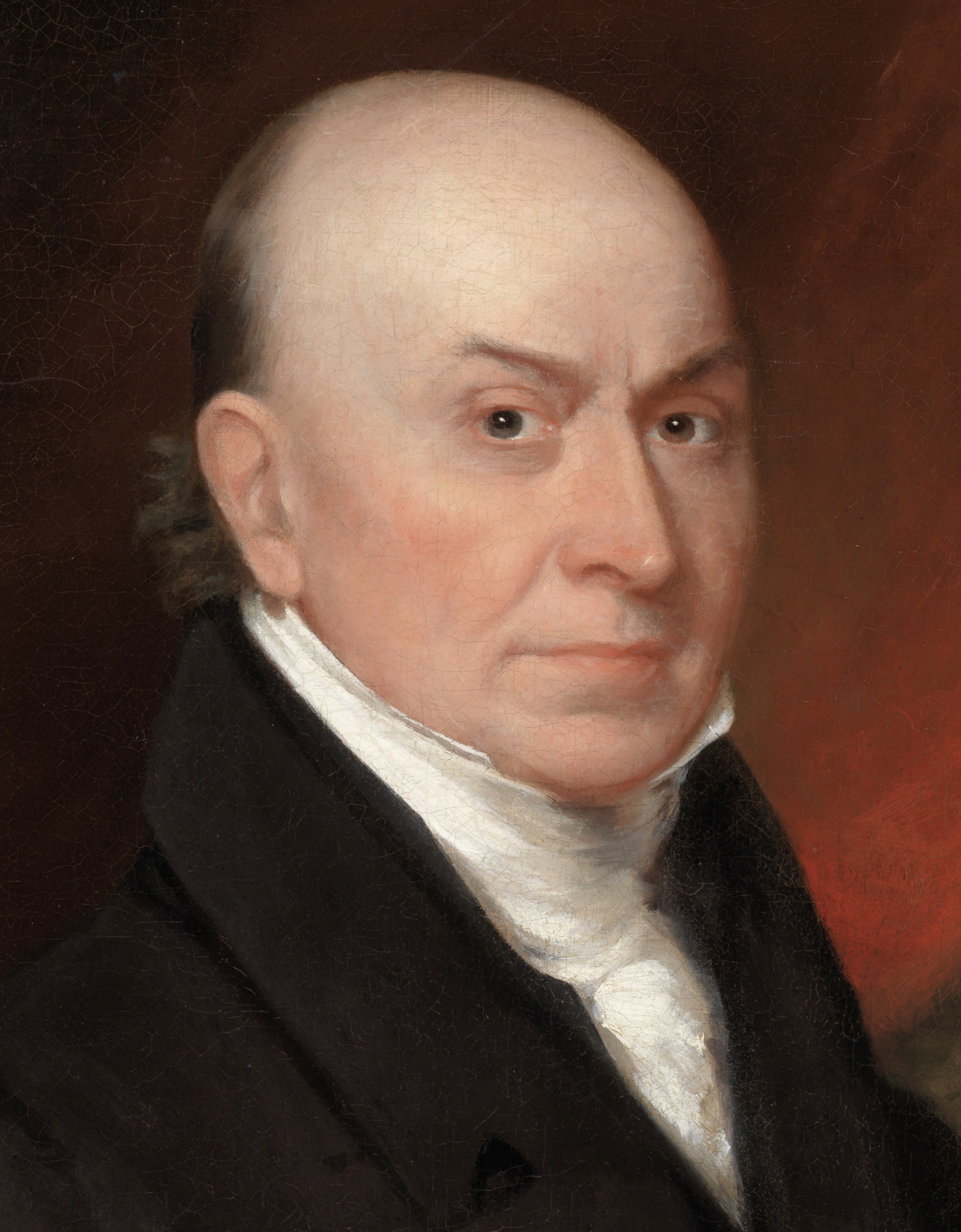

Nominee	John Quincy Adams	Andrew Jackson
Party	National Republican	Democratic
Home state	Massachusetts	Tennessee
Running mate	Richard Rush	John C. Calhoun
Electoral vote	8	0
Popular vote	23,823	20,212
Percentage	54.10%	45.90%
County results
Adams
50–60%
60–70%
Jackson
50–60%
60–70%
No Data/Vote

The 1828 United States presidential election in New Hampshire took place between October 31 and December 2, 1828, as part of the 1828 United States presidential election. Voters chose eight representatives, or electors to the Electoral College, who voted for President and Vice President.

New Hampshire voted for the National Republican candidate, John Quincy Adams, over the Democratic candidate, Andrew Jackson. Adams won New Hampshire by a margin of 8.2%.

== Results ==
1828 United States presidential election in New Hampshire
Party	Candidate	Votes	Percentage	Electoral votes
National Republican	John Quincy Adams (incumbent)	23,823	54.10%	8
Democratic	Andrew Jackson	20,212	45.90%	0
Totals		44,035	100.0%	8

== See also ==
- United States presidential elections in New Hampshire
