= 1864 United States presidential election in New Hampshire =

- November 8, 1864

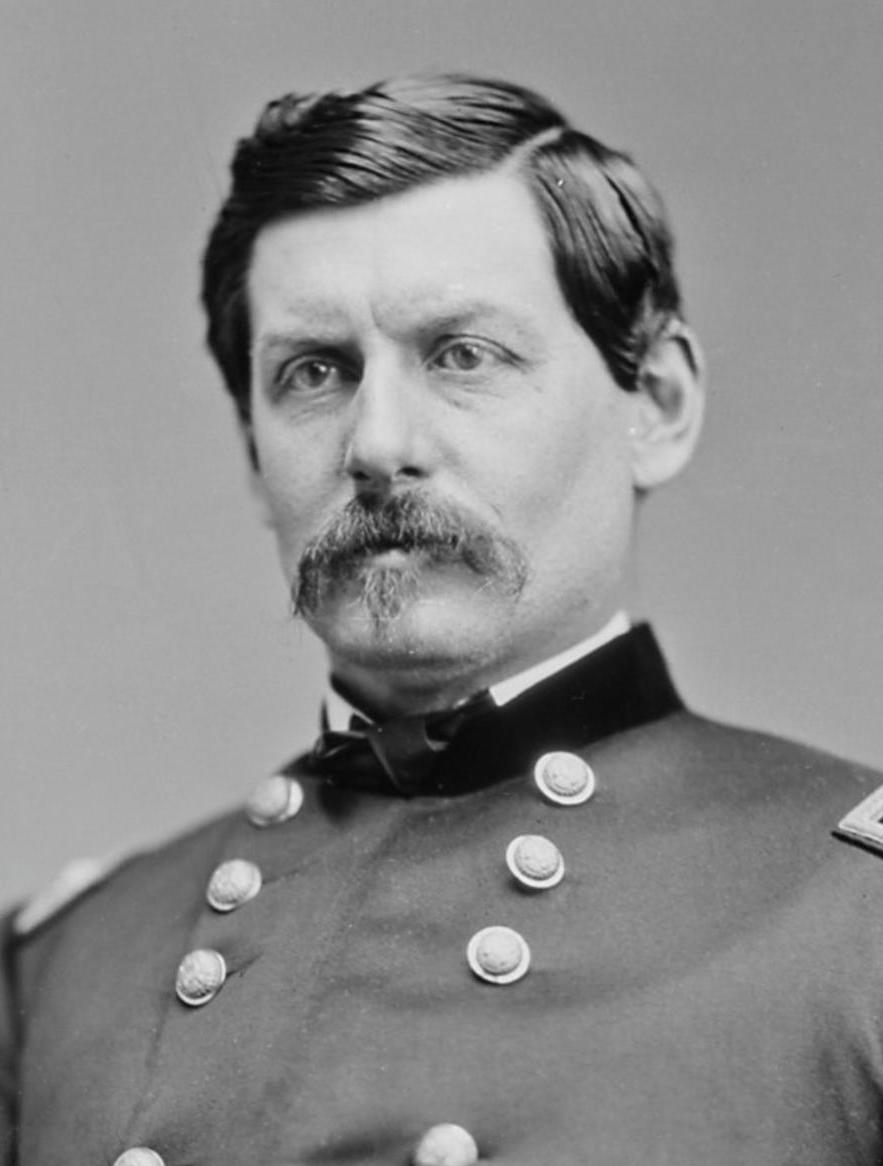
Nominee	Abraham Lincoln	George B. McClellan
Party	National Union	Democratic
Home state	Illinois	New Jersey
Running mate	Andrew Johnson	George H. Pendleton
Electoral vote	5	0
Popular vote	36,596	33,034
Percentage	52.56%	47.44%
County results
Lincoln
50–60%
McClellan
50–60%
President before election
Abraham Lincoln
Republican
Elected President
Abraham Lincoln
National Union

The 1864 United States presidential election in New Hampshire took place on November 8, 1864, as part of the 1864 United States presidential election. Voters chose five representatives or electors to the Electoral College, who voted for president and vice president.

New Hampshire voted for the National Union candidate, incumbent president Abraham Lincoln and his running mate Andrew Johnson. They defeated the Democratic candidate, George B. McClellan and his running mate George H. Pendleton. Lincoln won the state by a margin of 5.12%.

== Results ==
1864 United States presidential election in New Hampshire
Party	Candidate	Votes	Percentage	Electoral votes
National Union	Abraham Lincoln (incumbent)	36,596	52.56%	5
Democratic	George B. McClellan	33,034	47.44%	0
Totals		69,630	100.0%	5

== See also ==
- United States presidential elections in New Hampshire
