= 1940 United States presidential election in Maine =

- November 5, 1940

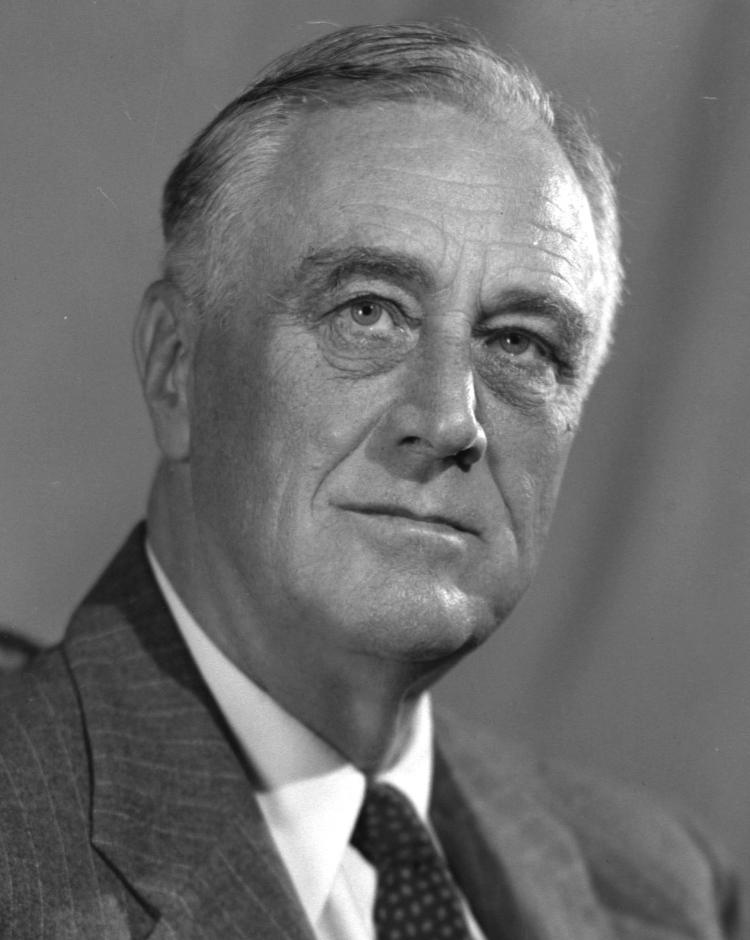
Nominee	Wendell Willkie	Franklin D. Roosevelt
Party	Republican	Democratic
Home state	New York	New York
Running mate	Charles L. McNary	Henry A. Wallace
Electoral vote	5	0
Popular vote	163,951	156,478
Percentage	51.10%	48.77%
County results
Willkie
50–60%
60–70%
Roosevelt
50–60%
60–70%
President before election
Franklin D. Roosevelt
Democratic
Elected President
Franklin D. Roosevelt
Democratic

The 1940 United States presidential election in Maine took place on November 5, 1940. All contemporary 48 states were part of the 1940 United States presidential election. State voters chose five electors to the Electoral College, which selected the president and vice president. Maine was won by Republican businessman Wendell Willkie of New York, who was running against incumbent Democratic President Franklin D. Roosevelt of New York. Willkie ran with Senator Charles L. McNary of Oregon while Roosevelt ran with Henry A. Wallace of Iowa.

Willkie won Maine by a narrow margin of 2.33%. This represented a swing of 11.66% to Roosevelt during an election where he lost eight states and almost 700 counties that had supported him four years earlier, mostly because of Midwestern German-American opposition to increasing tension with Nazi Germany. However, the Atlanticist tendencies of Yankee and French-Canadian Maine and support for aid to the United Kingdom and France in World War II led to substantial gains for Roosevelt in the state. Maine ultimately became one of five states that shifted left from 1936, alongside New Hampshire, North Carolina, Rhode Island, and Vermont. Of these five, however, Maine's 11.66% swing was the strongest by far, almost three times the amount neighboring New Hampshire swung by.

This was the first time that Kennebec County, home of state capital Augusta, had ever voted for a Democratic presidential candidate.

== Results ==
1940 United States presidential election in Maine
Party	Candidate	Running mate	Popular vote		Electoral vote	
Party	Candidate	Running mate	Count	%	Count	%
Republican	Wendell Willkie of New York	Charles Linza McNary of Oregon	163,951	51.10%	5	100.00%
Democratic	Franklin Delano Roosevelt of New York	Henry Agard Wallace of Iowa	156,478	48.77%	0	0.00%
Communist	Earl Russell Browder of Kansas	James W. Ford of New York	411	0.13%	0	0.00%
Total			320,840	100.00%	5	100.00%

=== Results by county ===
County	Wendell Lewis Willkie Republican		Franklin Delano Roosevelt Democratic		Earl Russell Browder Communist		Margin		Total votes cast
County	#	%	#	%	#	%	#	%	Total votes cast
Androscoggin	10,394	34.99%	19,273	64.88%	40	0.13%	-8,879	-29.89%	29,707
Aroostook	13,888	58.34%	9,877	41.49%	39	0.16%	4,011	16.85%	23,804
Cumberland	29,795	52.47%	26,911	47.39%	76	0.13%	2,884	5.08%	56,782
Franklin	4,548	58.47%	3,224	41.44%	7	0.09%	1,324	17.02%	7,779
Hancock	8,539	66.36%	4,315	33.54%	13	0.10%	4,224	32.83%	12,867
Kennebec	14,877	48.36%	15,861	51.56%	27	0.09%	-984	-3.20%	30,765
Knox	6,530	60.76%	4,197	39.05%	20	0.19%	2,333	21.71%	10,747
Lincoln	5,244	68.42%	2,415	31.51%	5	0.07%	2,829	36.91%	7,664
Oxford	8,656	53.49%	7,502	46.36%	25	0.15%	1,154	7.13%	16,183
Penobscot	18,674	55.79%	14,757	44.09%	40	0.12%	3,917	11.70%	33,471
Piscataquis	3,806	52.05%	3,499	47.85%	7	0.10%	307	4.20%	7,312
Sagadahoc	3,504	43.30%	4,575	56.54%	13	0.16%	-1,071	-13.24%	8,092
Somerset	7,526	53.42%	6,534	46.38%	28	0.20%	992	7.04%	14,088
Waldo	5,170	61.56%	3,214	38.27%	14	0.17%	1,956	23.29%	8,398
Washington	6,253	43.65%	8,048	56.18%	25	0.17%	-1,795	-12.53%	14,326
York	16,547	42.59%	22,276	57.33%	32	0.08%	-5,729	-14.74%	38,855
Totals	163,951	51.10%	156,478	48.77%	411	0.13%	7,473	2.33%	320,840

==== Counties that flipped from Republican to Democratic ====
- Kennebec
- Sagadahoc

== See also ==
- United States presidential elections in Maine
