= 1856 United States presidential election in New Hampshire =

- November 4, 1856
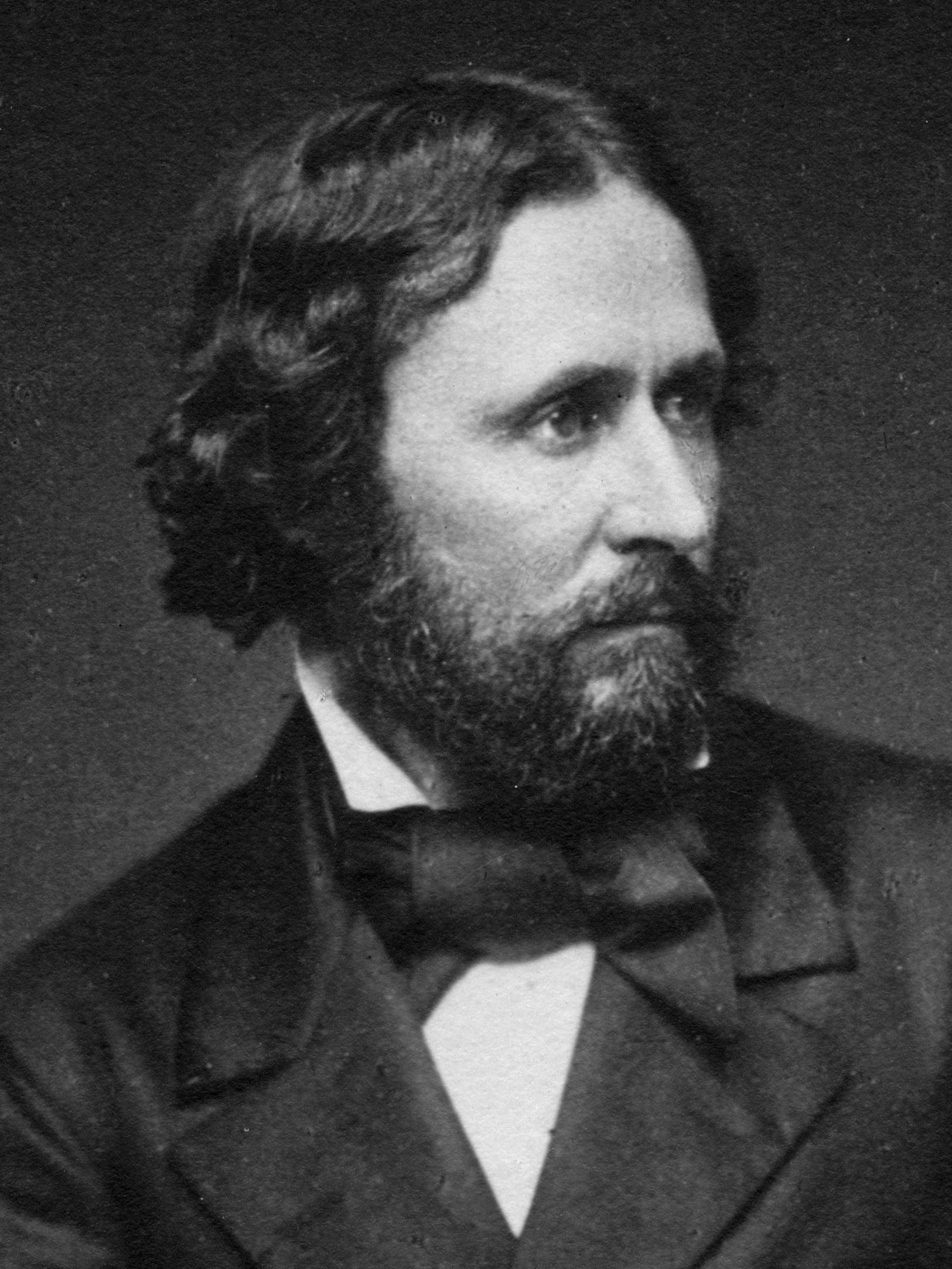

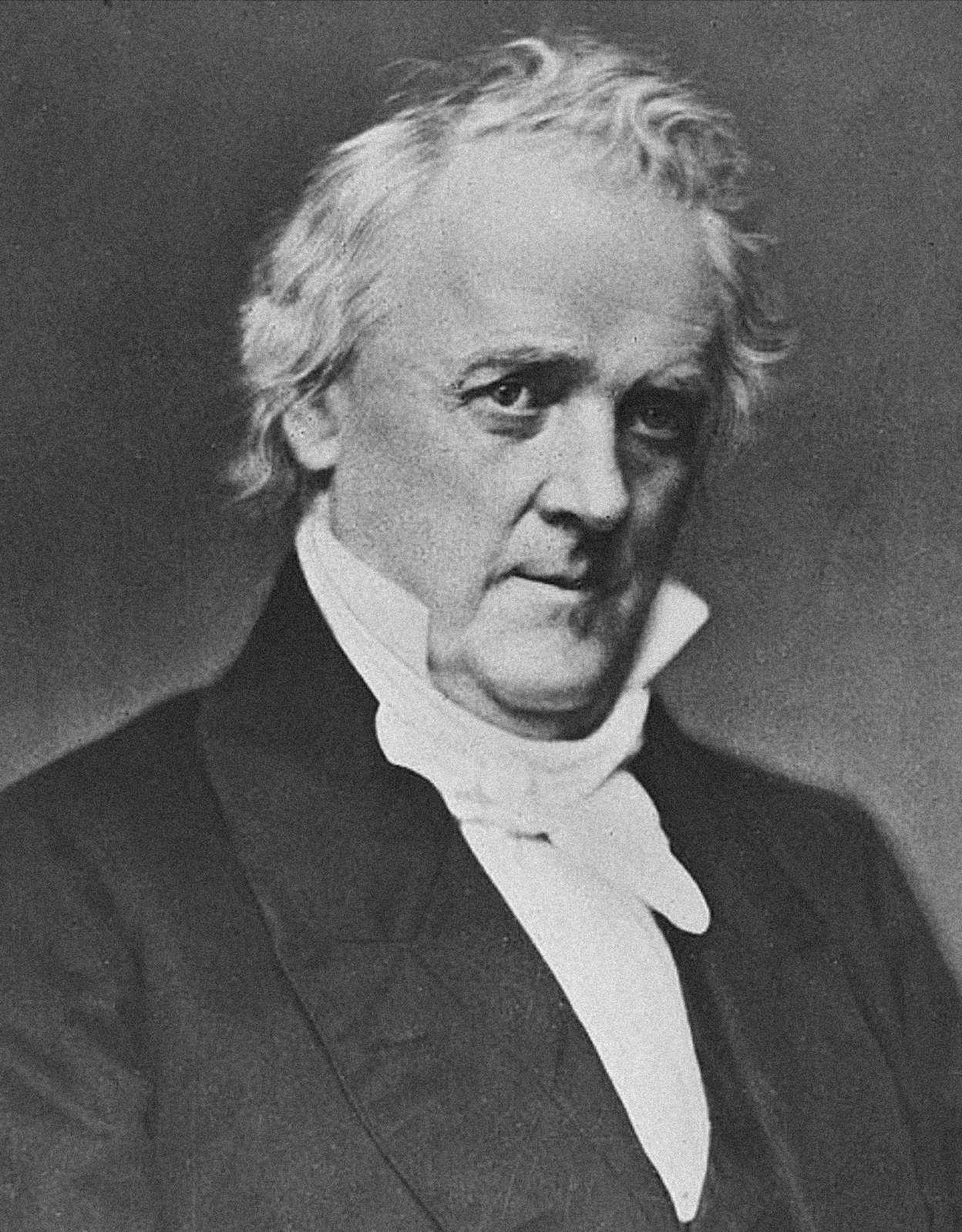
Nominee	John C. Frémont	James Buchanan
Party	Republican	Democratic
Home state	California	Pennsylvania
Running mate	William L. Dayton	John C. Breckinridge
Electoral vote	5	0
Popular vote	37,473	31,891
Percentage	53.71%	45.71%
County results
Frémont
50–60%
60–70%
Buchanan
50–60%
President before election
Franklin Pierce
Democratic
Elected President
James Buchanan
Democratic

The 1856 United States presidential election in New Hampshire took place on November 4, 1856, as part of the 1856 United States presidential election. Voters chose five representatives, or electors to the Electoral College, who voted for President and Vice President.

New Hampshire was won by Republican Party candidate, former California Senator John C. Frémont, who won the state by a narrow vote margin of less than 6,000 votes. He then lost nationally to Democratic Party candidate former United States Minister to the United Kingdom James Buchanan.

This was a realigning election for New Hampshire, which had been a Democrat-dominated state since the Jackson Administration. The new Republican Party quickly established itself and the Granite State would not be carried by a Democratic presidential candidate again until Woodrow Wilson won it in 1912. New Hampshire was the home state of then-President Franklin Pierce, who supported James Buchanan in this election.

== Results ==
1856 United States presidential election in New Hampshire
Party	Candidate	Votes	%
Republican	John C. Frémont	37,473	53.71%
Democratic	James Buchanan	31,891	45.71%
Know Nothing	Millard Fillmore	410	0.59%
Total votes		69,774	100.00%

=== Results by County ===
1856 United States Presidential Election in New Hampshire (By County)
County	John C. Frémont Republican		James Buchanan Democratic		Millard Fillmore Know Nothing		Total
County	#	%	#	%	#	%	Total
Belknap	2,062	47.92%	2,220	51.59%	21	0.49%	4,303
Carroll	2,185	46.36%	2,511	53.28%	17	0.36%	4,713
Cheshire	3,910	62.71%	2,269	36.39%	56	0.90%	6,235
Coos	1,200	44.26%	1,509	55.66%	2	0.07%	2,711
Grafton	5,029	51.91%	4,619	47.68%	39	0.40%	9,687
Hillsborough	7,081	56.68%	5,326	42.64%	85	0.68%	12,492
Merrimack	4,949	50.91%	4,730	48.65%	43	0.44%	9,722
Rockingham	5,914	54.06%	4,915	44.93%	111	1.01%	10,940
Strafford	3,566	56.88%	2,683	42.80%	20	0.32%	6,269
Sullivan	2,449	54.62%	2,007	44.76%	28	0.62%	4,484
Totals	37,473	53.71%	31,891	45.71%	410	0.59%	69,774

== See also ==
- United States presidential elections in New Hampshire
