= 1832 United States presidential election in New Hampshire =

- November 2 – December 5, 1832
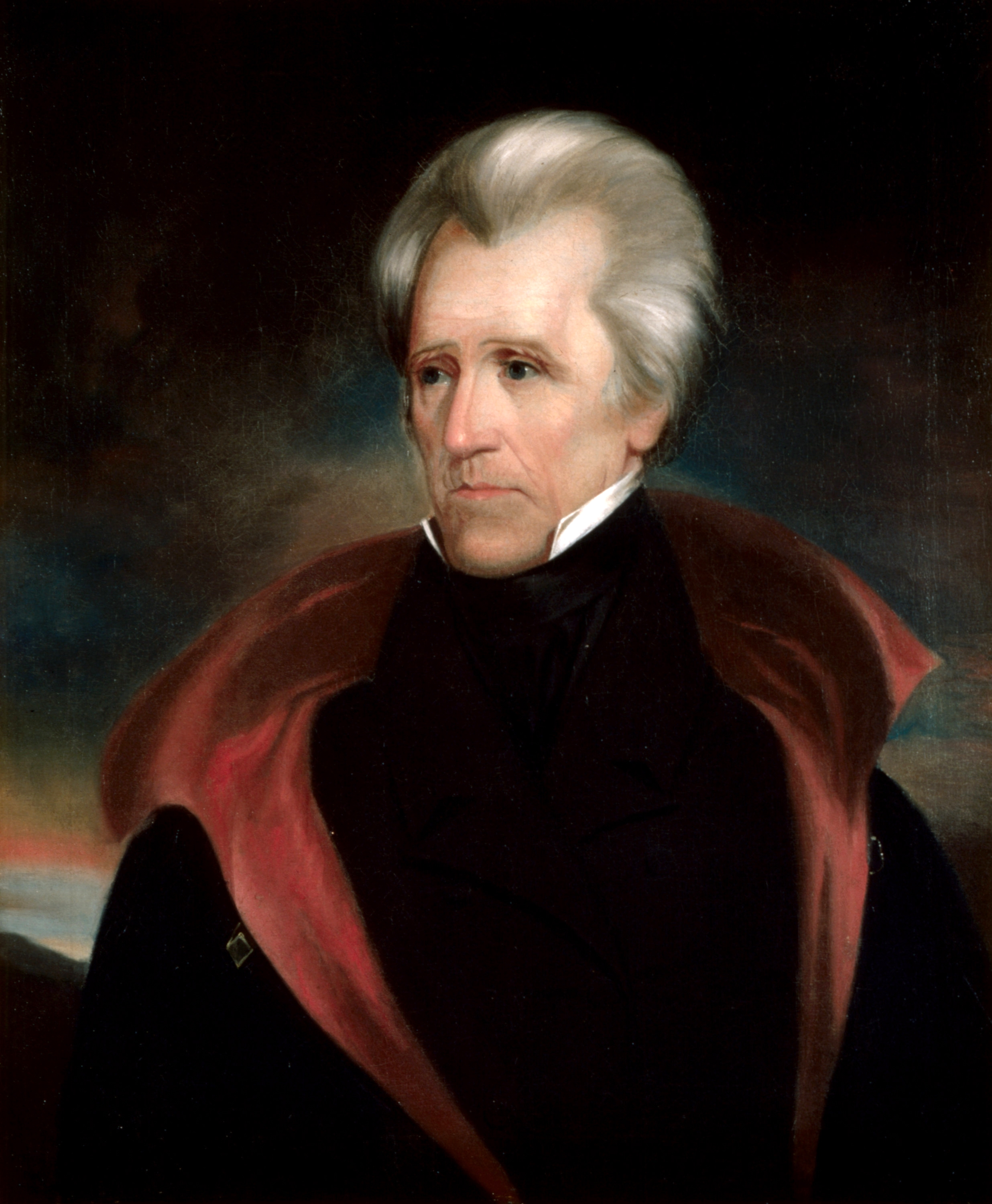

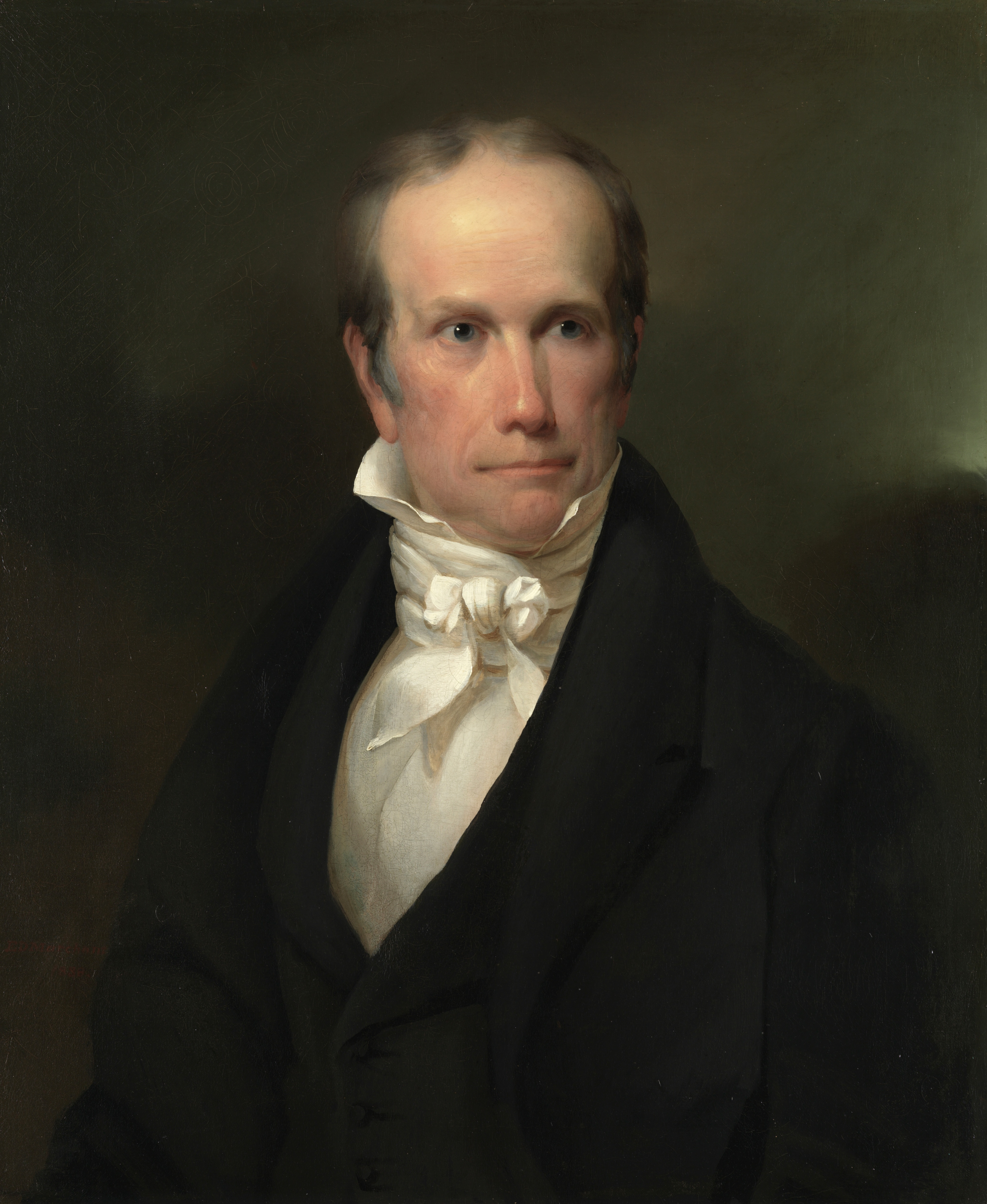
Nominee	Andrew Jackson	Henry Clay
Party	Democratic	National Republican
Home state	Tennessee	Kentucky
Running mate	Martin Van Buren	John Sergeant
Electoral vote	7	0
Popular vote	24,855	18,938
Percentage	56.76%	43.24%
County results
Jackson
50–60%
60–70%
70–80%
Clay
60–70%

The 1832 United States presidential election in New Hampshire took place between November 2 and December 5, 1832, as part of the 1832 United States presidential election. Voters chose seven representatives, or electors to the Electoral College, who voted for President and Vice President.

New Hampshire voted for the Democratic Party candidate, Andrew Jackson, over the National Republican candidate, Henry Clay. Jackson won New Hampshire by a margin of 13.52%.

== Results ==
1832 United States presidential election in New Hampshire
Party	Candidate	Votes	Percentage	Electoral votes
Democratic	Andrew Jackson (incumbent)	24,855	56.76%	7
National Republican	Henry Clay	18,938	43.24%	0
Totals		43,793	100.0%	7

== See also ==
- United States presidential elections in New Hampshire
