= 1940 United States presidential election in North Carolina =

- November 5, 1940

All 13 North Carolina votes to the Electoral College

Nominee	Franklin D. Roosevelt	Wendell Willkie
Party	Democratic	Republican
Home state	New York	New York
Running mate	Henry A. Wallace	Charles L. McNary
Electoral vote	13	0
Popular vote	609,015	213,633
Percentage	74.03%	25.97%
County results
Roosevelt
50–60%
60–70%
70–80%
80–90%
90–100%
Willkie
50–60%
60–70%
70–80%
President before election
Franklin D. Roosevelt
Democratic
Elected President
Franklin D. Roosevelt
Democratic

The 1940 United States presidential election in North Carolina took place on November 5, 1940, as part of the 1940 United States presidential election. North Carolina voters chose 13 representatives, or electors, to the Electoral College, who voted for president and vice president.

As a former Confederate state, North Carolina had a history of Jim Crow laws, disfranchisement of its African-American population and dominance of the Democratic Party in state politics. However, unlike the Deep South, the Republican Party had sufficient historic Unionist white support from the mountains and northwestern Piedmont to gain one-third of the statewide vote total in most general elections, where turnout was higher than elsewhere in the former Confederacy due substantially to the state's early abolition of the poll tax in 1920. Like Virginia, Tennessee and Oklahoma, the relative strength of Republican opposition meant that North Carolina did not have statewide white primaries, although certain counties did use the white primary. North Carolina was one of five states that shifted left from 1936, alongside Maine, New Hampshire, Rhode Island, and Vermont.

In 1928, anti-Catholicism in the Outer Banks and growing middle-class urban Republicanism in Piedmont cities caused North Carolina to turn to GOP nominee Herbert Hoover, but this was reversed in the following decade beginning with Hoover's failed nomination of John Johnston Parker to the Supreme Court. With the South having the highest unemployment in the nation and blaming the North and Wall Street, exceptionally heavy support was given to Roosevelt in 1932 and 1936 everywhere except in a few rock-ribbed Republican mountain bastions. Nevertheless, there was virtually no change to the state's social structure during the New Deal, and the conservative "Shelby Dynasty" was strong enough to prevent any populist challenge so much as developing. After the 1936 Democratic landslide and Roosevelt's failed "court-packing" plan, the state's leading federal officeholders came to increasingly oppose Roosevelt's policies.

Although the state's relatively numerous Republicans were highly active in support of nominees Wendell Willkie and Senate Minority Leader Charles L. McNary, early analysts said Roosevelt remained so popular with the state's voters that there was no chance of the incumbent losing. A poll in mid-October had Roosevelt carrying the state by a three-to-one margin after having given the incumbent 72 percent during the third week of September.

== Results ==
1940 United States presidential election in North Carolina
Party	Candidate	Votes	%
Democratic	Franklin D. Roosevelt (inc.)	609,015	74.03%
Republican	Wendell Willkie	213,633	25.97%
Total votes		822,648	100%

=== Results by county ===
1940 United States presidential election in North Carolina by county
County	Franklin Delano Roosevelt Democratic		Wendell Lewis Willkie Republican		Margin	
County	%	#	%	#	%	#
Martin	97.76%	4,628	2.24%	106	95.52%	4,522
Northampton	97.33%	3,826	2.67%	105	94.66%	3,721
Bertie	97.10%	3,287	2.90%	98	94.21%	3,189
Greene	96.64%	2,990	3.36%	104	93.28%	2,886
Pitt	96.46%	10,067	3.54%	369	92.93%	9,698
Hertford	96.40%	2,464	3.60%	92	92.80%	2,372
Edgecombe	95.97%	7,516	4.03%	316	91.93%	7,200
Halifax	95.67%	7,982	4.33%	361	91.35%	7,621
Franklin	95.42%	4,724	4.58%	227	90.83%	4,497
Granville	94.85%	3,924	5.15%	213	89.70%	3,711
Chowan	94.68%	1,547	5.32%	87	89.35%	1,460
Hoke	94.21%	1,904	5.79%	117	88.42%	1,787
Currituck	93.76%	1,532	6.24%	102	87.52%	1,430
Lenoir	93.42%	6,247	6.58%	440	86.84%	5,807
Nash	93.24%	8,456	6.76%	613	86.48%	7,843
Wilson	93.13%	7,912	6.87%	584	86.25%	7,328
Gates	92.78%	1,388	7.22%	108	85.56%	1,280
Anson	92.46%	4,552	7.54%	371	84.93%	4,181
Scotland	92.26%	2,981	7.74%	250	84.52%	2,731
Union	91.89%	7,179	8.11%	634	83.77%	6,545
Vance	91.80%	4,252	8.20%	380	83.59%	3,872
Warren	91.55%	2,676	8.45%	247	83.10%	2,429
Robeson	90.86%	9,251	9.14%	931	81.71%	8,320
Onslow	89.79%	2,383	10.21%	271	79.58%	2,112
Richmond	89.34%	6,530	10.66%	779	78.68%	5,751
Craven	88.70%	4,916	11.30%	626	77.41%	4,290
Person	88.23%	3,239	11.77%	432	76.46%	2,807
Pender	88.06%	2,249	11.94%	305	76.12%	1,944
Camden	87.76%	961	12.24%	134	75.53%	827
Lee	87.48%	3,682	12.52%	527	74.96%	3,155
Wake	87.16%	18,083	12.84%	2,665	74.31%	15,418
Caswell	86.93%	2,335	13.07%	351	73.86%	1,984
Pasquotank	86.75%	3,314	13.25%	506	73.51%	2,808
Columbus	86.33%	5,900	13.67%	934	72.67%	4,966
Durham	85.60%	14,810	14.40%	2,491	71.20%	12,319
Beaufort	85.52%	5,528	14.48%	936	71.04%	4,592
Jones	85.47%	1,371	14.53%	233	70.95%	1,138
Cumberland	84.40%	6,050	15.60%	1,118	68.81%	4,932
Bladen	84.34%	2,925	15.66%	543	68.69%	2,382
New Hanover	84.03%	8,600	15.97%	1,635	68.05%	6,965
Perquimans	83.76%	1,176	16.24%	228	67.52%	948
Washington	82.65%	1,724	17.35%	362	65.29%	1,362
Cleveland	82.59%	9,346	17.41%	1,970	65.18%	7,376
Rockingham	82.51%	11,315	17.49%	2,398	65.03%	8,917
Cabarrus	82.03%	11,776	17.97%	2,579	64.07%	9,197
Wayne	81.41%	7,222	18.59%	1,649	62.82%	5,573
Duplin	81.06%	5,394	18.94%	1,260	62.13%	4,134
Mecklenburg	80.40%	28,768	19.60%	7,013	60.80%	21,755
Gaston	80.08%	17,262	19.92%	4,294	60.16%	12,968
Hyde	79.55%	1,202	20.45%	309	59.10%	893
Dare	79.40%	1,214	20.60%	315	58.80%	899
Haywood	78.55%	8,631	21.45%	2,357	57.10%	6,274
Alamance	77.17%	11,429	22.83%	3,382	54.33%	8,047
Orange	76.95%	3,673	23.05%	1,100	53.91%	2,573
Rowan	76.24%	13,023	23.76%	4,059	52.48%	8,964
Forsyth	74.36%	20,664	25.64%	7,125	48.72%	13,539
Harnett	74.33%	6,602	25.67%	2,280	48.66%	4,322
Buncombe	74.04%	24,878	25.96%	8,723	48.08%	16,155
Tyrrell	73.31%	1,140	26.69%	415	46.62%	725
Guilford	73.11%	26,565	26.89%	9,770	46.22%	16,795
Iredell	73.00%	10,328	27.00%	3,820	46.00%	6,508
McDowell	70.48%	5,290	29.52%	2,216	40.95%	3,074
Johnston	70.41%	9,976	29.59%	4,192	40.82%	5,784
Chatham	68.76%	4,025	31.24%	1,829	37.51%	2,196
Carteret	68.53%	3,896	31.47%	1,789	37.06%	2,107
Surry	67.98%	8,871	32.02%	4,178	35.96%	4,693
Rutherford	67.84%	8,869	32.16%	4,204	35.68%	4,665
Caldwell	67.82%	6,334	32.18%	3,005	35.65%	3,329
Catawba	66.51%	11,233	33.49%	5,656	33.02%	5,577
Pamlico	66.48%	1,448	33.52%	730	32.97%	718
Jackson	65.44%	4,563	34.56%	2,410	30.88%	2,153
Brunswick	64.10%	2,717	35.90%	1,522	28.19%	1,195
Henderson	63.06%	6,336	36.94%	3,712	26.11%	2,624
Swain	62.96%	2,422	37.04%	1,425	25.92%	997
Montgomery	62.70%	3,007	37.30%	1,789	25.40%	1,218
Moore	62.60%	4,330	37.40%	2,587	25.20%	1,743
Transylvania	62.13%	3,312	37.87%	2,019	24.25%	1,293
Polk	61.63%	2,454	38.37%	1,528	23.25%	926
Alleghany	61.60%	1,952	38.40%	1,217	23.19%	735
Davidson	61.37%	11,084	38.63%	6,978	22.73%	4,106
Lincoln	61.26%	4,901	38.74%	3,099	22.53%	1,802
Stokes	61.18%	4,274	38.82%	2,712	22.36%	1,562
Burke	59.70%	7,242	40.30%	4,889	19.40%	2,353
Yancey	58.10%	3,489	41.90%	2,516	16.20%	973
Stanly	58.04%	6,321	41.96%	4,569	16.09%	1,752
Graham	56.32%	1,404	43.68%	1,089	12.64%	315
Macon	55.99%	2,941	44.01%	2,312	11.97%	629
Alexander	55.27%	2,739	44.73%	2,217	10.53%	522
Randolph	54.51%	8,455	45.49%	7,056	9.02%	1,399
Cherokee	54.32%	3,180	45.68%	2,674	8.64%	506
Clay	53.43%	1,349	46.57%	1,176	6.85%	173
Davie	53.35%	2,896	46.65%	2,532	6.71%	364
Ashe	53.04%	4,716	46.96%	4,175	6.08%	541
Watauga	49.16%	3,615	50.84%	3,739	-1.69%	-124
Yadkin	47.31%	3,660	52.69%	4,077	-5.39%	-417
Sampson	46.96%	5,107	53.04%	5,769	-6.09%	-662
Wilkes	46.36%	7,299	53.64%	8,446	-7.28%	-1,147
Madison	40.72%	3,171	59.28%	4,617	-18.57%	-1,446
Mitchell	30.59%	1,450	69.41%	3,290	-38.82%	-1,840
Avery	28.85%	1,194	71.15%	2,944	-42.29%	-1,750

==== Counties that flipped from Republican to Democratic ====
- Clay
- Davie

==== Counties that flipped from Democratic to Republican ====
- Sampson
- Watauga

== Analysis ==
Large portions of the interior of the United States – heavily populated by German Americans – opposed increasing "tension" with Nazi dictator Adolf Hitler and would switch support to Willkie. North Carolina, however, was historically one of the least isolationist states, and its almost entirely English and Scotch-Irish descended electorate strongly favored as much aid to Britain's World War II effort as possible. Thus, North Carolina's electorate did not merely resist the GOP shift in the heartland – in many Appalachian counties with normally substantial Republican support, FDR gained on what he had achieved in his 1932 and 1936 national landslides.

North Carolina was thus won in a landslide by incumbent President Roosevelt and running mate Agriculture Secretary Henry A. Wallace, with 74.03 percent of the popular vote, against Willkie's 25.97 percent.

As of the 2020 presidential election, this is the last election in which Davie County and Randolph County voted for a Democratic presidential candidate. This is also the best Democratic performance in the state since Andrew Jackson in 1832.
