= 1872 United States presidential election in New Hampshire =

- November 5, 1872
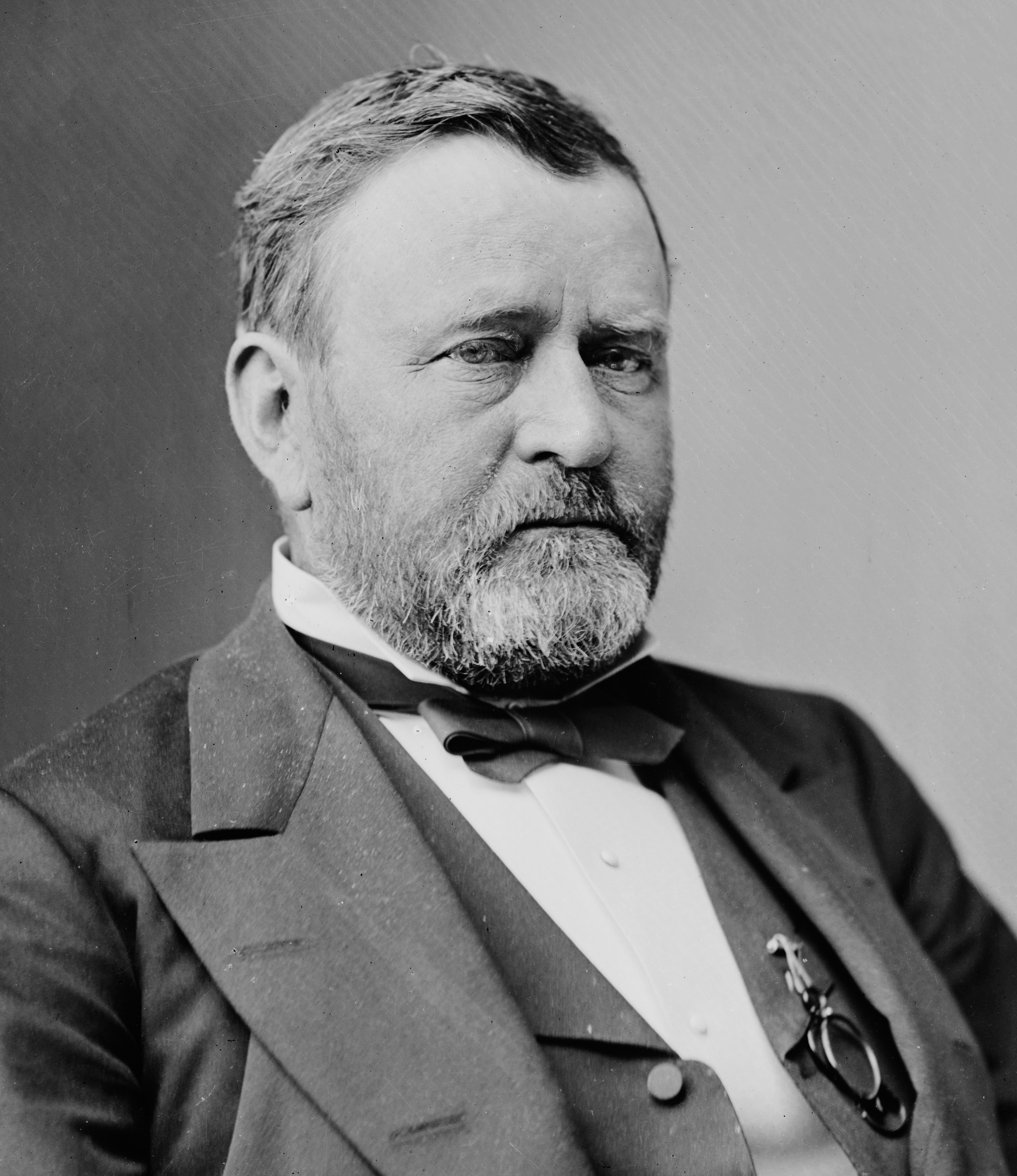

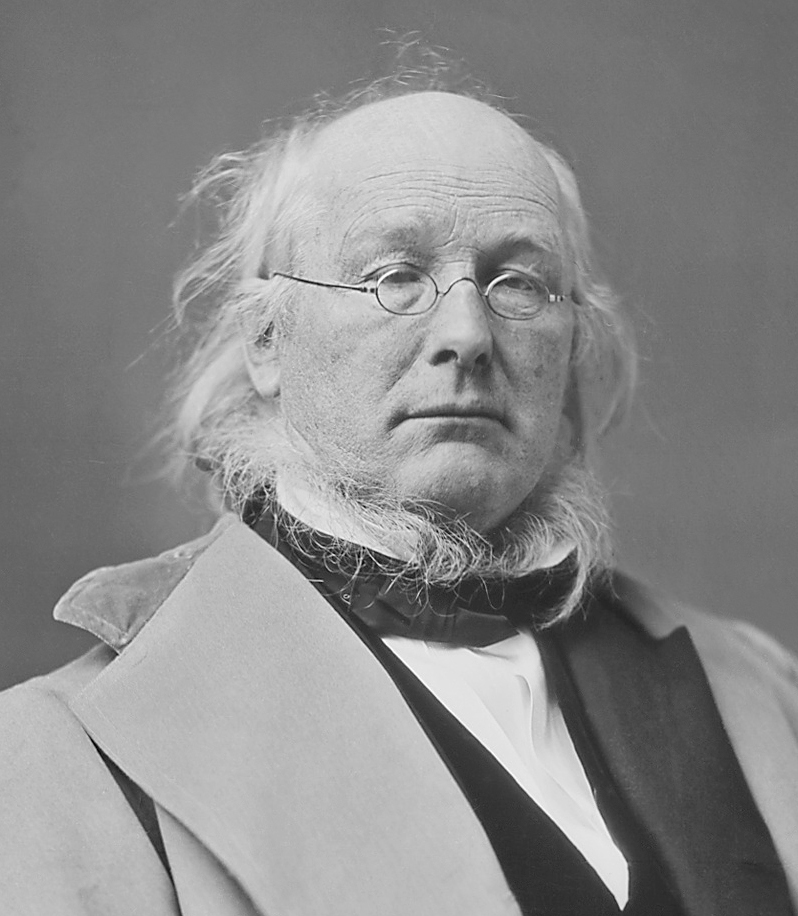
Nominee	Ulysses S. Grant	Horace Greeley
Party	Republican	Liberal Republican
Home state	Illinois	New York
Running mate	Henry Wilson	B. Gratz Brown
Electoral vote	5	0
Popular vote	37,168	31,425
Percentage	53.94%	45.61%
County results
Grant
40–50%
50–60%
60–70%
Greeley
50–60%
President before election
Ulysses S. Grant
Republican
Elected President
Ulysses S. Grant
Republican

The 1872 United States presidential election in New Hampshire took place on November 5, 1872. All contemporary 37 states were part of the 1872 United States presidential election. The state voters chose five electors to the Electoral College, which selected the president and vice president.

New Hampshire was won by the Republican nominees, incumbent President Ulysses S. Grant of Illinois and his running mate Senator Henry Wilson of Massachusetts. Grant and Wilson defeated the Liberal Republican and Democratic nominees, former Congressman Horace Greeley of New York and his running mate former Senator and Governor Benjamin Gratz Brown of Missouri by a margin of 8.33%.

Horace Greeley was born in Amherst, New Hampshire.

== Results ==
1872 United States presidential election in New Hampshire
Party	Candidate	Running mate	Popular vote		Electoral vote	
Party	Candidate	Running mate	Count	%	Count	%
Republican	Ulysses S. Grant of Illinois	Henry Wilson of Massachusetts	37,168	53.94%	5	100.00%
Liberal Republican	Horace Greeley of New York	Benjamin Gratz Brown of Missouri	31,425	45.61%	0	0.00%
Prohibition	James Black of Pennsylvania	John Russell of Michigan	200	0.29%	0	0.00%
Bourbon Democrat	Charles O’Conor of New York	John Quincy Adams II of Massachusetts	113	0.16%	0	0.00%
Total			68,906	100.00%	5	100.00%

== See also ==
- United States presidential elections in New Hampshire
