= 1868 United States presidential election in New Hampshire =

- November 3, 1868
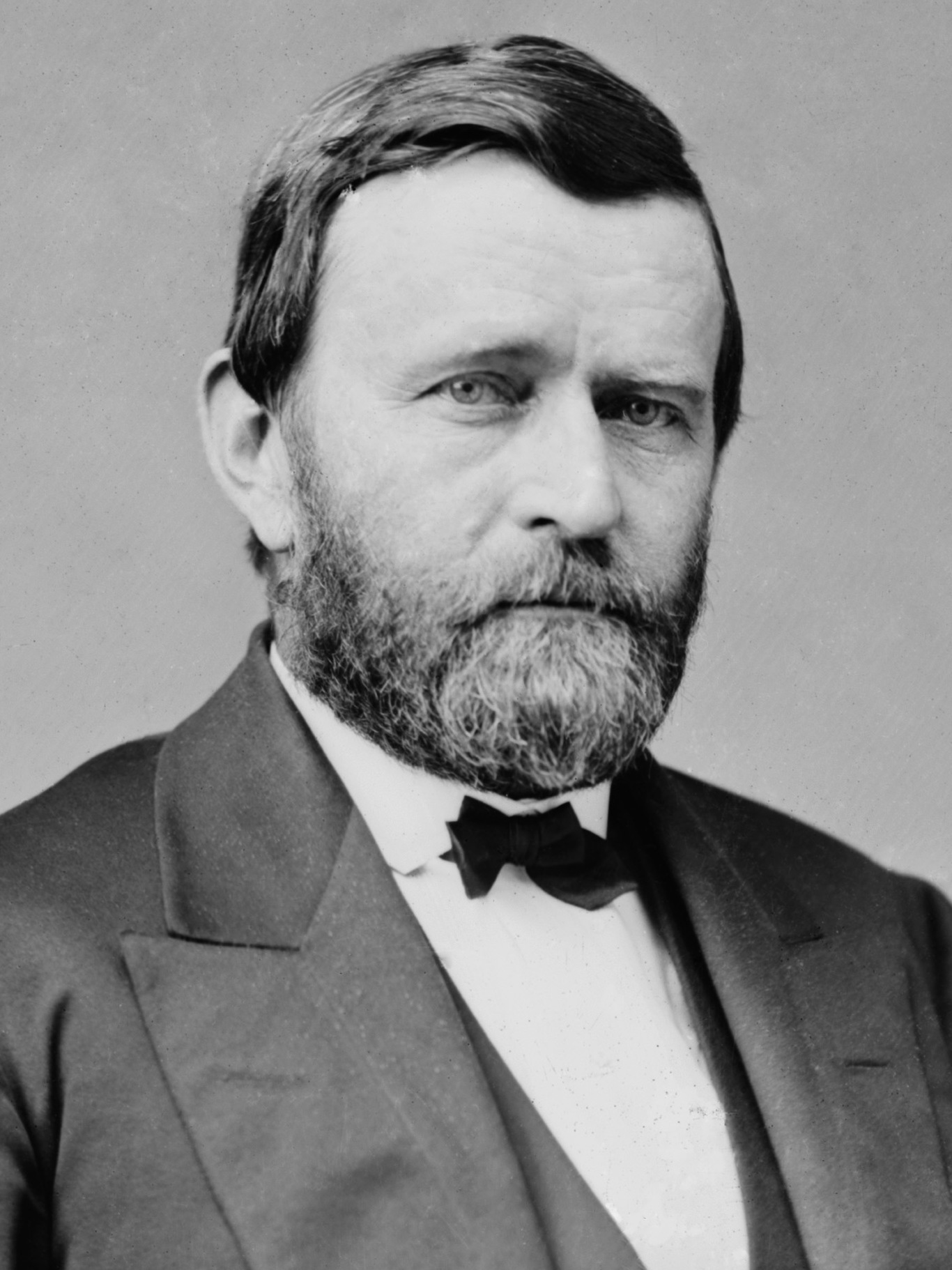

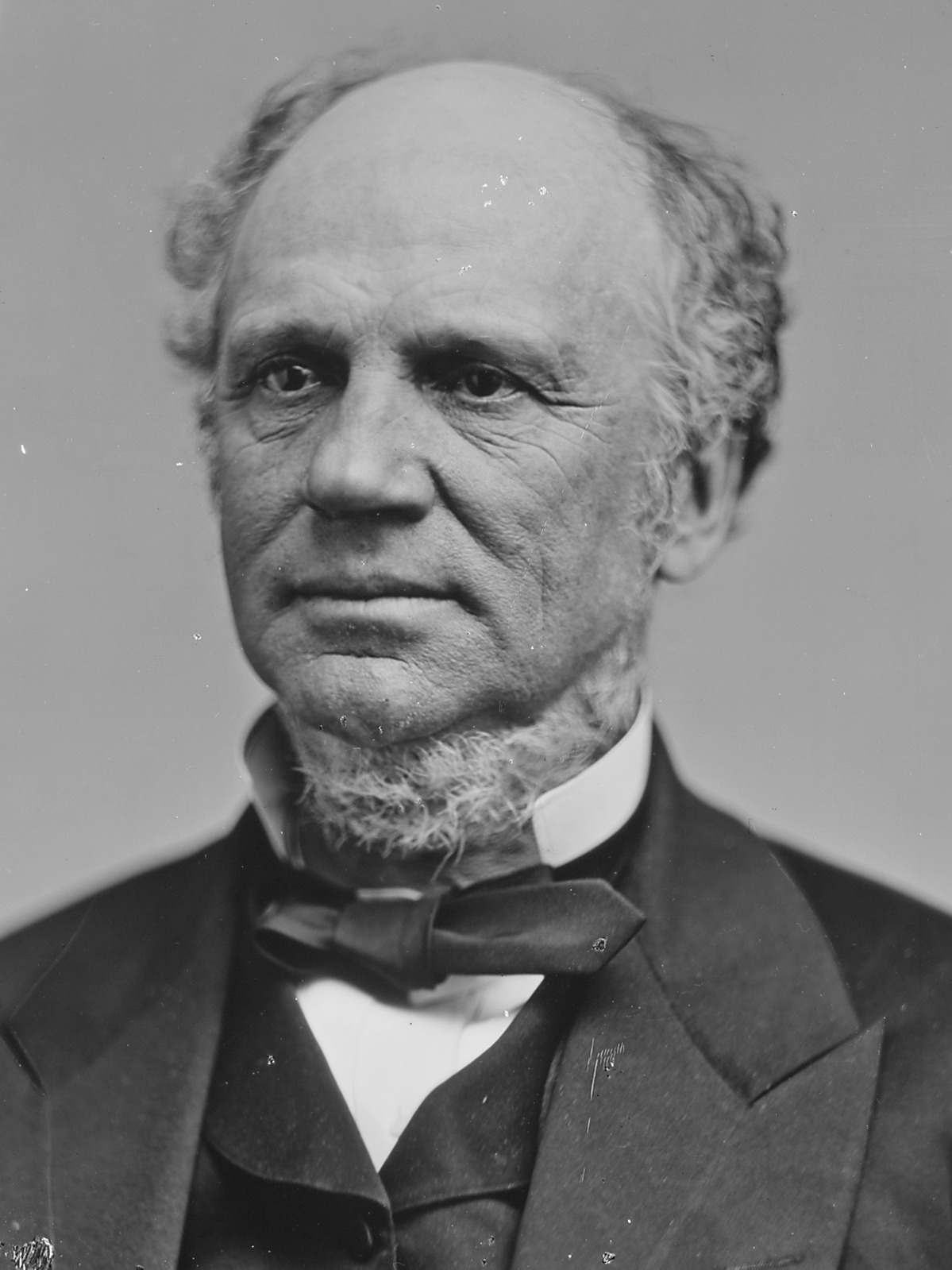
Nominee	Ulysses S. Grant	Horatio Seymour
Party	Republican	Democratic
Home state	Illinois	New York
Running mate	Schuyler Colfax	Francis Preston Blair Jr.
Electoral vote	5	0
Popular vote	37,718	12,045
Percentage	55.22%	44.76%
County results
Grant
50–60%
60–70%
Seymour
50–60%
President before election
Andrew Johnson
Democratic
Elected President
Ulysses S. Grant
Republican

The 1868 United States presidential election in New Hampshire took place on November 3, 1868, as part of the 1868 United States presidential election. Voters chose five representatives, or electors to the Electoral College, who voted for president and vice president.

New Hampshire voted for the Republican nominee, Ulysses S. Grant, over the Democratic nominee, Horatio Seymour. Grant won the state by a margin of 10.46%.

== Results ==
1868 United States presidential election in New Hampshire
Party	Candidate	Running mate	Popular vote		Electoral vote	
Party	Candidate	Running mate	Count	%	Count	%
Republican	Ulysses S. Grant of Illinois	Schuyler Colfax of Indiana	37,718	55.22%	5	100.00%
Democratic	Horatio Seymour of New York	Francis Preston Blair Jr. of Missouri	30,575	44.76%	0	0.00%
N/A	Others	Others	11	0.02%	0	0.00%
Total			68,304	100.00%	5	100.00%

== See also ==
- United States presidential elections in New Hampshire
