= 1860 United States presidential election in New Hampshire =

- November 2, 1860
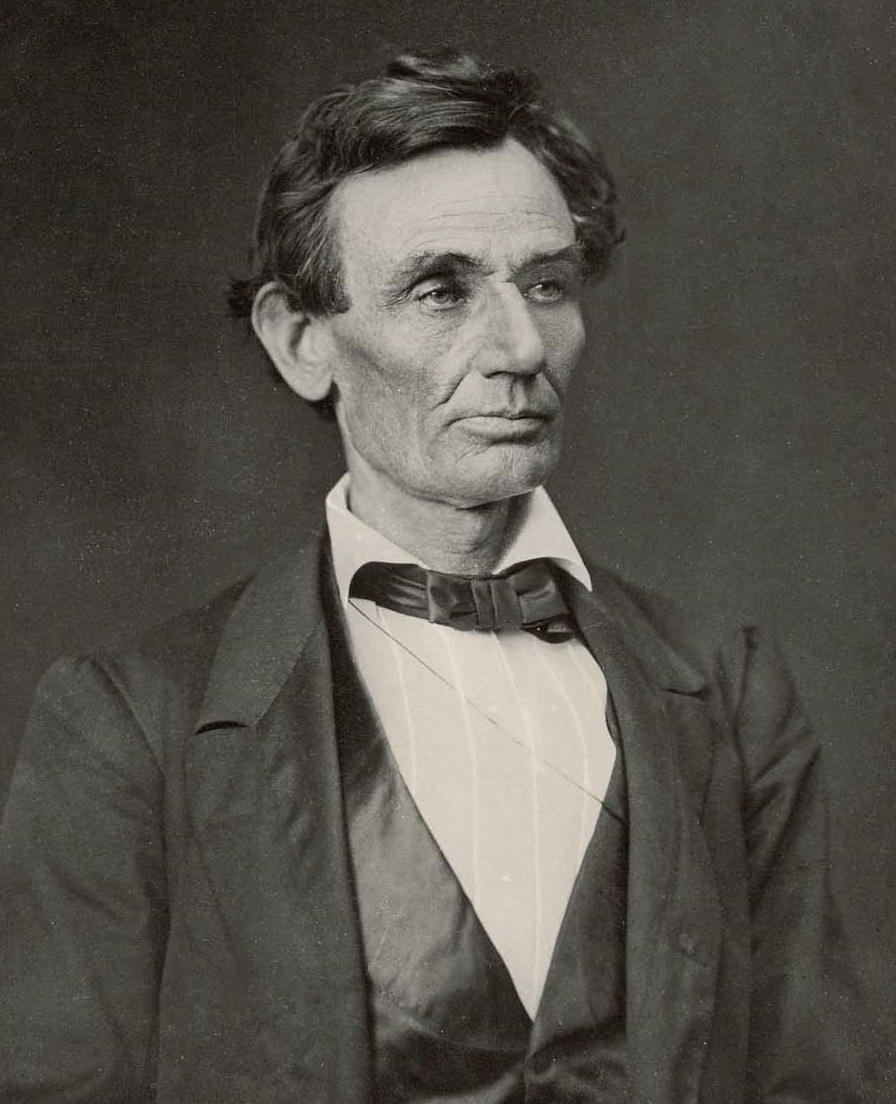

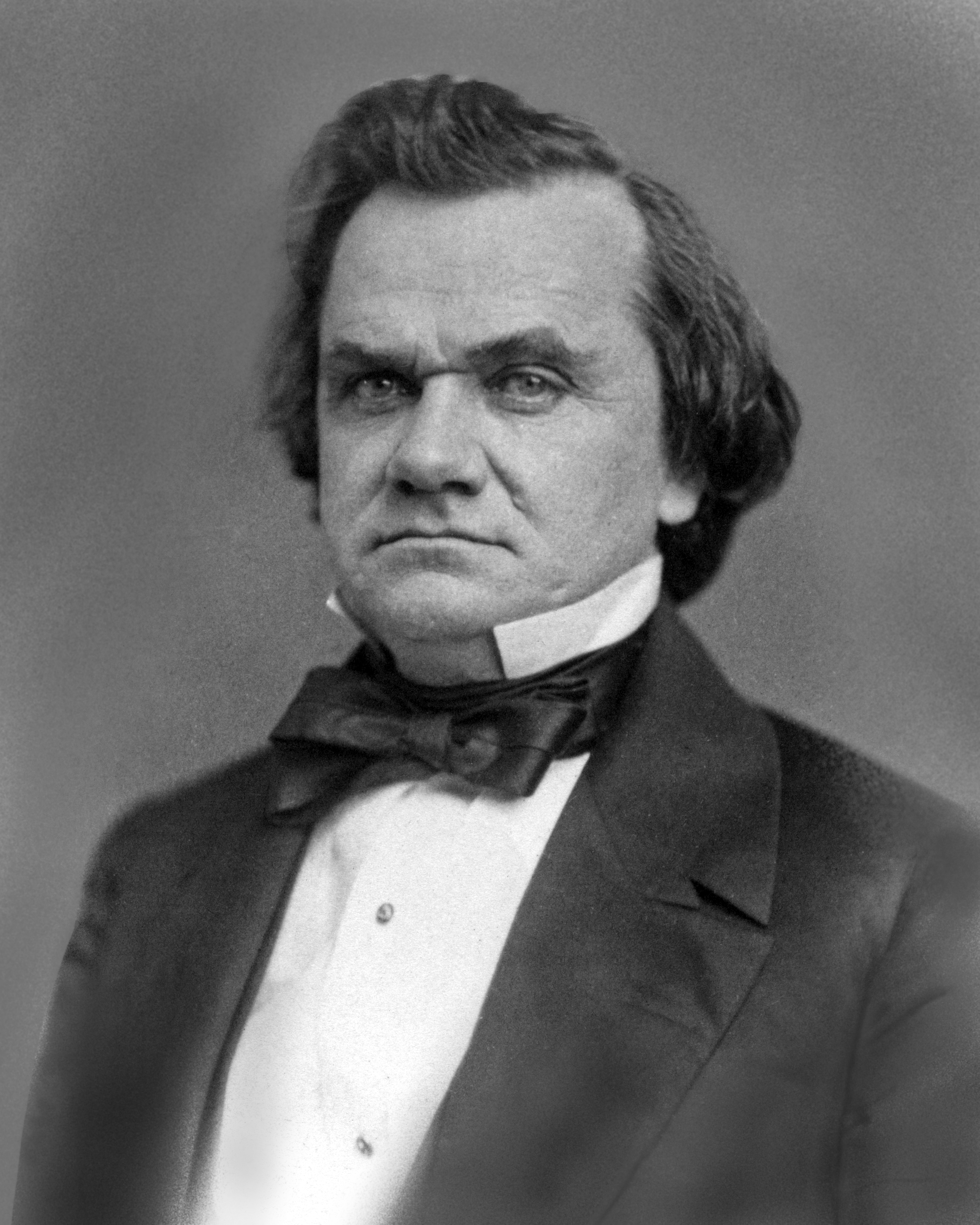
Nominee	Abraham Lincoln	Stephen A. Douglas
Party	Republican	Democratic
Home state	Illinois	Illinois
Running mate	Hannibal Hamlin	Herschel V. Johnson
Electoral vote	5	0
Popular vote	37,519	25,887
Percentage	56.90%	39.26%
County results
Lincoln
40–50%
50–60%
60–70%
President before election
James Buchanan
Democratic
Elected President
Abraham Lincoln
Republican

The 1860 United States presidential election in New Hampshire took place on November 2, 1860, as part of the 1860 United States presidential election. Voters chose five electors of the Electoral College, who voted for president and vice president.

New Hampshire was won by Republican candidate Abraham Lincoln, who won the state by 17.64%.

== Results ==
1860 United States presidential election in New Hampshire
Party	Candidate	Running mate	Popular vote		Electoral vote	
Party	Candidate	Running mate	Count	%	Count	%
Republican	Abraham Lincoln of Illinois	Hannibal Hamlin of Maine	37,519	56.90%	5	100.00%
Democratic	Stephen A. Douglas of Illinois	Herschel V. Johnson of Georgia	25,887	39.26%	0	0.00%
Southern Democratic	John C. Breckinridge of Kentucky	Joseph Lane of Oregon	2,125	3.22%	0	0.00%
Constitutional Union	John Bell of Tennessee	Edward Everett of Massachusetts	412	0.62%	0	0.00%
Total			65,943	100.00%	5	100.00%

=== Results by county ===
1860 United States presidential election in New Hampshire (by county)
County	Abraham Lincoln Republican		Stephen A. Douglas Democratic		John C. Breckinridge Southern Democratic		John Bell Constitutional Union		Total votes cast
County	#	%	#	%	#	%	#	%	Total votes cast
Belknap	1,981	51.86%	1,786	46.75%	48	1.26%	5	0.13%	3,820
Carroll	2,148	51.25%	1,993	47.55%	42	1.00%	8	0.19%	4,191
Cheshire	3,843	64.68%	1,912	32.18%	166	2.79%	21	0.35%	5,942
Coös	1,349	49.52%	1,330	48.83%	43	1.58%	2	0.07%	2,724
Grafton	4,823	55.36%	3,504	40.22%	343	3.94%	42	0.48%	8,712
Hillsborough	6,888	58.60%	4,557	38.77%	221	1.88%	88	0.75%	11,754
Merrimack	4,794	53.63%	3,813	42.66%	276	3.09%	56	0.63%	8,939
Rockingham	5,720	59.08%	3,228	33.34%	618	6.38%	116	1.20%	9,682
Strafford	3,536	60.63%	1,995	34.21%	258	4.42%	43	0.74%	5,832
Sullivan	2,437	56.32%	1,763	40.74%	97	2.24%	30	0.69%	4,327
Total	37,519	56.90%	25,887	39.26%	2,112	3.22%	411	0.62%	65,929

==== Counties that flipped from Democratic to Republican ====
- Belknap
- Carroll
- Coös

== See also ==
- United States presidential elections in New Hampshire
