= 1824 United States presidential election in New Hampshire =

- October 26 – December 2, 1824
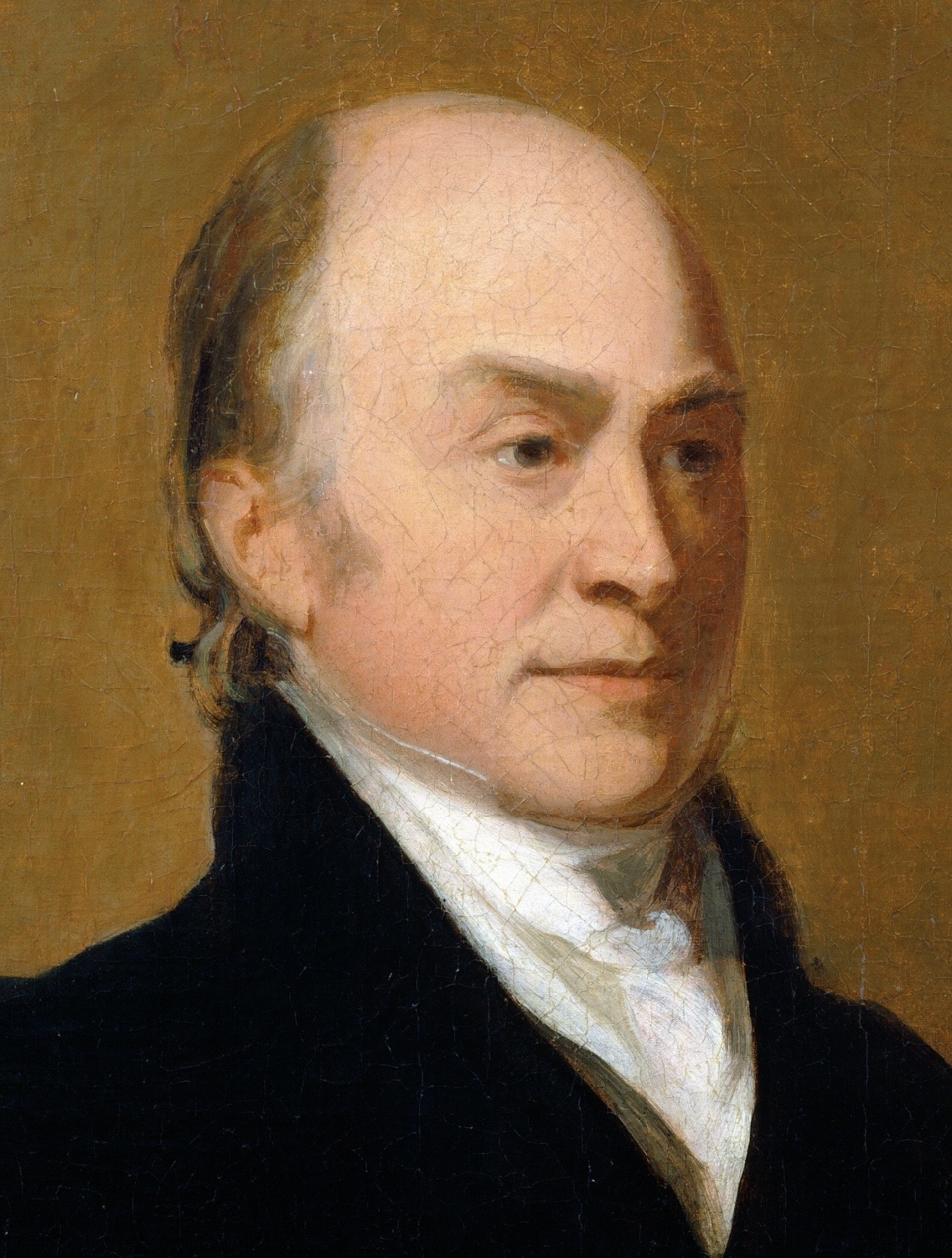

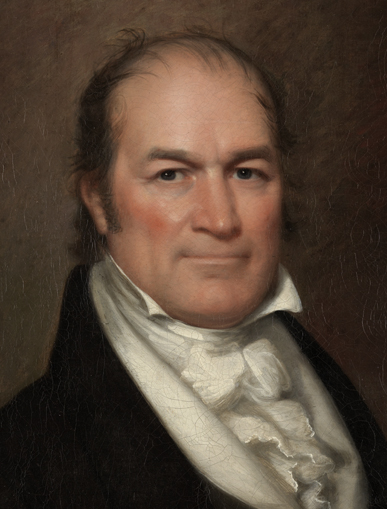
Nominee	John Quincy Adams	William H. Crawford
Party	Democratic-Republican	Democratic-Republican
Alliance	Adams-Clay Republican	Old Republican
Home state	Massachusetts	Georgia
Running mate	John C. Calhoun	Nathaniel Macon
Electoral vote	8	0
Popular vote	9,389	643
Percentage	93.59%	6.41%
County results
Adams
90–100%
President before election
James Monroe
Democratic-Republican
Elected President
John Quincy Adams
Democratic-Republican

The 1824 United States presidential election in New Hampshire took place between October 26 and December 2, 1824, as part of the 1824 United States presidential election. Voters chose eight representatives, or electors, to the Electoral College, who voted for president and vice president.

During this election, the Democratic-Republican Party was the only major national party, and four different candidates from this party sought the presidency. New Hampshire voted for John Quincy Adams over William H. Crawford, Andrew Jackson, and Henry Clay. Adams won New Hampshire by a margin of 87.18%.

== Results ==
1824 United States presidential election in New Hampshire
Party	Candidate	Votes	Percentage	Electoral votes
Democratic-Republican	John Quincy Adams	9,389	93.59%	8
Democratic-Republican	William H. Crawford	643	6.41%	0
Totals		10,032	100.0%	8

== See also ==
- United States presidential elections in New Hampshire
