= 1912 United States presidential election in New Hampshire =

- November 5, 1912

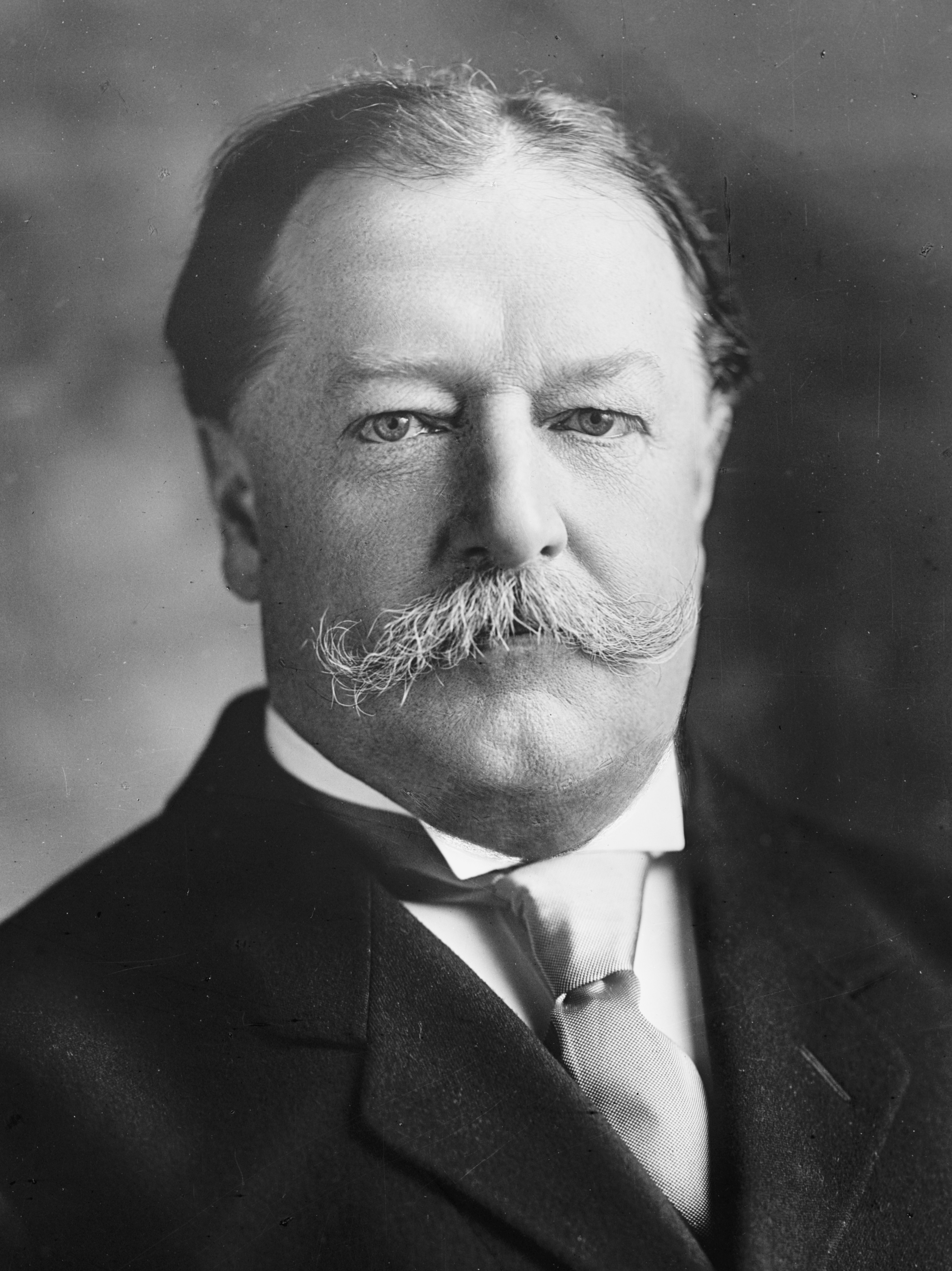

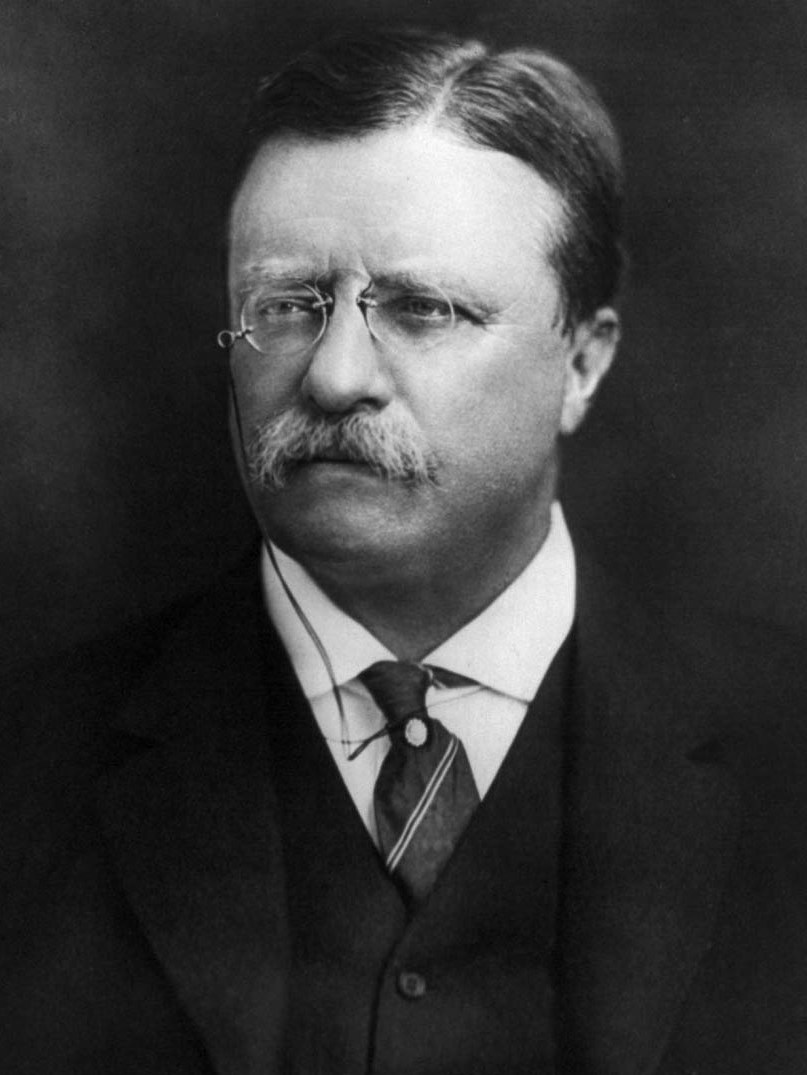
Nominee	Woodrow Wilson	William Howard Taft	Theodore Roosevelt
Party	Democratic	Republican	Progressive
Home state	New Jersey	Ohio	New York
Running mate	Thomas R. Marshall	Nicholas Murray Butler	Hiram Johnson
Electoral vote	4	0	0
Popular vote	34,724	32,927	17,794
Percentage	39.48%	37.43%	20.23%

Wilson
30–40%
40–50%
50–60%
60–70%
70–80%
Taft
30–40%
40–50%
50–60%
60–70%
70–80%
Roosevelt
30–40%
40–50%
60–70%
70–80%
Tie
30–40%
40–50%
President before election
William Howard Taft
Republican
Elected President
Woodrow Wilson
Democratic

The 1912 United States presidential election in New Hampshire took place on November 5, 1912, as part of the 1912 United States presidential election which was held throughout all contemporary 48 states. Voters chose four representatives, or electors to the Electoral College, who voted for president and vice president.

New Hampshire was won by the Democratic nominees, New Jersey Governor Woodrow Wilson and Indiana Governor Thomas R. Marshall. Wilson and Marshall defeated incumbent President William Howard Taft, and his running mate Vice President James S. Sherman and Progressive Party candidates, former President Theodore Roosevelt and his running mate California Governor Hiram Johnson.

Wilson won New Hampshire by a narrow margin of 2.05 points, becoming the first Democratic presidential candidate since New Hampshire native Franklin Pierce in 1852 to win the state or populous Hillsborough and Strafford Counties. He was the first Democrat since Grover Cleveland in 1892 to carry any of New Hampshire's counties, the first since Cleveland in 1888 to carry Merrimack and Rockingham Counties, the first to win Belknap County since Cleveland in 1884, and the first to win Grafton County since Winfield S. Hancock in 1880.

Although Taft ended up losing the state, New Hampshire would prove to be his second strongest state with 37.43 percent of the vote after Utah (Taft's sole other win beside neighboring Vermont).

This was the last time until 2008 that a Democratic presidential nominee would carry Carroll County. Belknap, Grafton, Merrimack and Rockingham Counties would not vote Democratic until 1964.

== Results ==
1912 United States presidential election in New Hampshire
Party	Candidate	Running mate	Popular vote		Electoral vote	
Party	Candidate	Running mate	Count	%	Count	%
Democratic	Woodrow Wilson of New Jersey	Thomas Riley Marshall of Indiana	34,724	39.48%	4	100.00%
Republican	William Howard Taft of Ohio (incumbent)	Nicholas Murray Butler of New York	32,927	37.43%	0	0.00%
Progressive	Theodore Roosevelt of New York	Hiram Warren Johnson of California	17,794	20.23%	0	0.00%
Socialist	Eugene Victor Debs of Indiana	Emil Seidel of Wisconsin	1,981	2.25%	0	0.00%
Prohibition	Eugene Wilder Chafin of Illinois	Aaron Sherman Watkins of Ohio	535	0.61%	0	0.00%
Total			87,961	100.00%	4	100.00%

=== Results by county ===
County	Thomas Woodrow Wilson Democratic		William Howard Taft Republican		Theodore Roosevelt Progressive "Bull Moose"		Eugene Victor Debs Socialist		Eugene Wilder Chafin Prohibition		Margin		Total votes cast
County	#	%	#	%	#	%	#	%	#	%	#	%	Total votes cast
Belknap	1,862	39.38%	1,741	36.82%	944	19.97%	103	2.18%	78	1.65%	121	2.56%	4,728
Carroll	1,820	43.12%	1,454	34.45%	881	20.87%	41	0.97%	25	0.59%	366	8.67%	4,221
Cheshire	2,114	33.44%	2,765	43.74%	1,252	19.81%	156	2.47%	34	0.54%	-651	-10.30%	6,321
Coös	2,229	40.52%	1,938	35.23%	1,103	20.05%	189	3.44%	42	0.76%	291	5.29%	5,501
Grafton	3,752	39.12%	3,520	36.70%	2,165	22.58%	93	0.97%	60	0.63%	232	2.42%	9,590
Hillsborough	8,909	39.96%	8,007	35.92%	4,586	20.57%	699	3.14%	93	0.42%	902	4.05%	22,294
Merrimack	4,741	40.00%	4,632	39.08%	2,119	17.88%	269	2.27%	92	0.78%	109	0.92%	11,853
Rockingham	4,306	38.21%	4,231	37.54%	2,465	21.87%	207	1.84%	61	0.54%	75	0.67%	11,270
Strafford	3,468	44.09%	2,962	37.66%	1,265	16.08%	140	1.95%	31	0.39%	506	6.43%	7,866
Sullivan	1,523	35.28%	1,677	38.85%	1,014	23.49%	84	1.95%	19	0.44%	-154	-3.57%	4,317
Totals	34,724	39.48%	32,927	37.43%	17,794	20.23%	1,981	2.25%	535	0.61%	1,797	2.04%	87,961

== See also ==
- United States presidential elections in New Hampshire
