= List of United States political families (I) =

The following is an alphabetical list of political families in the United States whose last name begins with I.

== The Ickes ==
- John Cudahy (1887–1943), candidate for Lieutenant Governor Wisconsin 1916, U.S. Ambassador to Poland 1933–37, U.S. Minister to Ireland 1937–40, U.S. Ambassador to Belgium 1940, U.S. Minister to Luxembourg 1940. Uncle by marriage of Harold L. Ickes.
  - Harold L. Ickes (1874–1952), delegate to the Republican National Convention 1920, U.S. Secretary of the Interior 1933–46, delegate to the Democratic National Convention 1936 1940 1944. Nephew by marriage of John Cudahy.
  - Anna Wilmarth Ickes (1873–1935), member of the Illinois House of Representatives 1929–1935. Wife of Harold L. Ickes.
    - Harold M. Ickes (born 1939), Deputy White House Chief of Staff 1994–97, candidate for Chairman of the Democratic National Committee 2005. Son of Harold L. Ickes.

== The Ingersolls of Illinois ==
- Ebon C. Ingersoll (1831–1879), Illinois State Representative 1856, U.S. Representative from Illinois 1864–71. Brother of Robert G. Ingersoll.
- Robert G. Ingersoll (1833–1899), Illinois State Representative 1860, Attorney General of Illinois 1867–69, delegate to the Republican National Convention 1876. Brother of Ebon C. Ingersoll.
  - John C. Ingersoll (1860–1903), U.S. Consul in Cartagena, Colombia 1902. Son of Ebon C. Ingersoll.

== The Ingersolls of Pennsylvania and Connecticut ==
- Jonathan Ingersoll (1747–1823), Superior Court Judge in Connecticut 1798–1801 1811–16, Lieutenant Governor of Connecticut 1816–23. First cousin of Jared Ingersoll.
- Jared Ingersoll (1749–1822), Delegate to the Continental Congress from Pennsylvania 1780, Attorney General of Pennsylvania 1791–1800 1811–16, U.S. Attorney of Pennsylvania 1800–01. First cousin of Jonathan Ingersoll.
  - Charles Jared Ingersoll (1782–1862), U.S. Representative from Pennsylvania 1813–15 1841–49, U.S. District Attorney of Pennsylvania 1815–29, Pennsylvania State Representative 1830, delegate to the Pennsylvania Constitutional Convention 1837. Son of Jared Ingersoll.
  - Joseph Reed Ingersoll (1786–1868), U.S. Representative from Pennsylvania 1835–37 1841–49, U.S. Minister to Britain 1852–53. Son of Jared Ingersoll.
  - Ralph Isaacs Ingersoll (1789–1872), Connecticut State Representative 1820–25, U.S. Representative from Connecticut 1825–33, State Attorney of New Haven County, Connecticut; U.S. Minister to Russia 1846–48, Mayor of New Haven, Connecticut 1851. Son of Jonathan Ingersoll.
  - Charles Anthony Ingersoll (1798–1860), U.S. District Court Judge of Connecticut 1853–60. Son of Jonathan Ingersoll.
    - Laman Ingersoll (1805–1863), New York Assemblyman 1851. Second cousin twice removed of Jonathan Ingersoll and Jared Ingersoll.
    - Colin M. Ingersoll (1819–1903), acting U.S. Charge D'Affaires in Russia 1848, U.S. Representative from Connecticut 1851–55, Adjutant General of Connecticut 1867–71. Son of Ralph Isaacs Ingersoll.
    - Charles R. Ingersoll (1821–1903), delegate to the Democratic National Convention 1864, Governor of Connecticut 1873–77. Son of Ralph Isaacs Ingersoll.
      - Charles Edward Ingersoll (1860–1932), delegate to the Democratic National Convention 1896, candidate for U.S. Representative from Pennsylvania 1902. Grandson of Charles Jared Ingersoll.
      - George Pratt Ingersoll (1861–1927), candidate for U.S. Representative from Connecticut 1910, U.S. Minister to Siam 1917–18. Son of Colin M. Ingersoll.

== The Irvings ==
- William Irving (1766–1821), U.S. Representative from New York 1814–19. Brother of Peter Irving, John T. Irving and Washington Irving.
- Peter Irving (1771–1838), New York Assemblyman 1802–03. Brother of William Irving, John T. Irving and Washington Irving.
- John T. Irving (1778–1838), New York Assemblyman 1816–17 1818–20, Judge of the New York Court of Common Pleas 1821–38. Brother of William Irving, Peter Irving and Washington Irving.
- Washington Irving (1783–1859), U.S. Minister to Spain 1842–46. Brother of William Irving, Peter Irving and John T. Irving.

NOTE: William Irving was also brother-in-law of U.S. Secretary of the Navy James Kirke Paulding.

== The Ives and Swifts ==
- Henry Adoniram Swift (1823–1869), candidate for U.S. Representative from Minnesota 1857, Minnesota State Senator 1862–65, Lieutenant Governor of Minnesota 1863, Governor of Minnesota 1863–64. Father-in-law of Gideon S. Ives.
  - Gideon S. Ives (1846–1927), Lieutenant Governor of Minnesota 1891–93. Son-in-law of Henry Adoniram Swift.

== The Iveys ==
- Glenn Ivey (born 1961), U.S. Representative from Maryland's 4th congressional district 2023–present; State's Attorney of Prince George's County, Maryland 2003–11.
- Jolene Ivey (born 1961), Prince George's County Councilmember 2018–present; candidate for Lieutenant Governor of Maryland 2014; Maryland House Delegate 2007–15. Wife of Glenn Ivey.
  - Julian Ivey (born 1995), Maryland House Delegate 2019–present. Son of Glenn and Jolene Ivey.

== The Izards and Campbells ==
- Ralph Izard (1742–1804), Delegate to the Continental Congress from South Carolina 1782–83, U.S. Senator from South Carolina 1789–95. Father of George Izard.
  - William Campbell (1731–1778), Governor of South Carolina Colony 1775. Brother-in-law of Ralph Izard.
  - George Izard (1776–1828), Governor of Arkansas Territory 1825–28. Son of Ralph Izard.

NOTE: Ralph Izard's daughter was also daughter-in-law of South Carolina Assemblyman Benjamin Smith and sister-in-law of Continental Congressional Delegate Isaac Motte, Izard's nieces were daughters-in-law of Georgia Colony Governor James Wright and U.S. Representative Thomas Pinckney.
