= 1815 in the United States =

- Decades: 1790s; 1800s; 1810s; 1820s; 1830s
- See also: History of the United States (1789–1849); Timeline of United States history (1790–1819); List of years in the United States

Events from the year 1815 in the United States. As news slowly spread of the Treaty of Ghent (1814) ending the War of 1812, battles between American and British forces continued in the early months of the year.

== Incumbents ==
=== Federal government ===
- President: James Madison (DR-Virginia)
- Vice President: vacant
- Chief Justice: John Marshall (Virginia)
- Speaker of the House of Representatives:

Langdon Cheves (DR-South Carolina) (until March 4)
Henry Clay (DR-Kentucky) (starting December 4)

- Congress: 13th (until March 4), 14th (starting March 4)

==== State governments ====
Governors and lieutenant governors

=== Governors ===
- Governor of Connecticut: John Cotton Smith (Federalist)
- Governor of Delaware: Daniel Rodney (Federalist)
- Governor of Georgia: Peter Early (Democratic-Republican) (until November 20), David Brydie Mitchell (Democratic-Republican) (starting November 20)
- Governor of Kentucky: Isaac Shelby (Democratic-Republican)
- Governor of Louisiana: William C. C. Claiborne (Democratic-Republican)
- Governor of Maryland: Levin Winder (Federalist)
- Governor of Massachusetts: Caleb Strong (Federalist)
- Governor of New Hampshire: John Taylor Gilman (Federalist)
- Governor of New Jersey:
  - until June 19: William Sanford Pennington (Democratic-Republican)
  - June 19-October 26: William Kennedy (Democratic-Republican)
  - starting October 26: Mahlon Dickerson (Democratic-Republican)
- Governor of New York: Daniel D. Tompkins (Democratic-Republican)
- Governor of North Carolina: William Miller (North Carolina politician) (Democratic-Republican)
- Governor of Ohio: Thomas Worthington (Democratic-Republican)
- Governor of Pennsylvania: Simon Snyder (Democratic-Republican)
- Governor of Rhode Island: William Jones (Federalist)
- Governor of South Carolina: David Rogerson Williams (Democratic-Republican)
- Governor of Tennessee: Willie Blount (Democratic-Republican) (until September 27), Joseph McMinn (Democratic-Republican) (starting September 27)
- Governor of Vermont: Martin Chittenden (Federalist) (until October 23), Jonas Galusha (Democratic-Republican) (starting October 23)
- Governor of Virginia: Wilson Cary Nicholas (Democratic-Republican)

=== Lieutenant governors ===
- Lieutenant Governor of Connecticut: Chauncey Goodrich (Federalist) (until month and day unknown), vacant (starting month and day unknown)
- Lieutenant Governor of Kentucky: Richard Hickman (political party unknown)
- Lieutenant Governor of Massachusetts: William Phillips, Jr. (political party unknown)
- Lieutenant Governor of New York: DeWitt Clinton (Democratic-Republican) (until month and day unknown), John Tayler (Democratic-Republican) (starting month and day unknown)
- Lieutenant Governor of Rhode Island: Simeon Martin (political party unknown)
- Lieutenant Governor of South Carolina: Robert Creswell (Democratic-Republican)
- Lieutenant Governor of Vermont: William Chamberlain (Federalist) (until October 14), Paul Brigham (Democratic-Republican) (starting October 14)

== Events ==
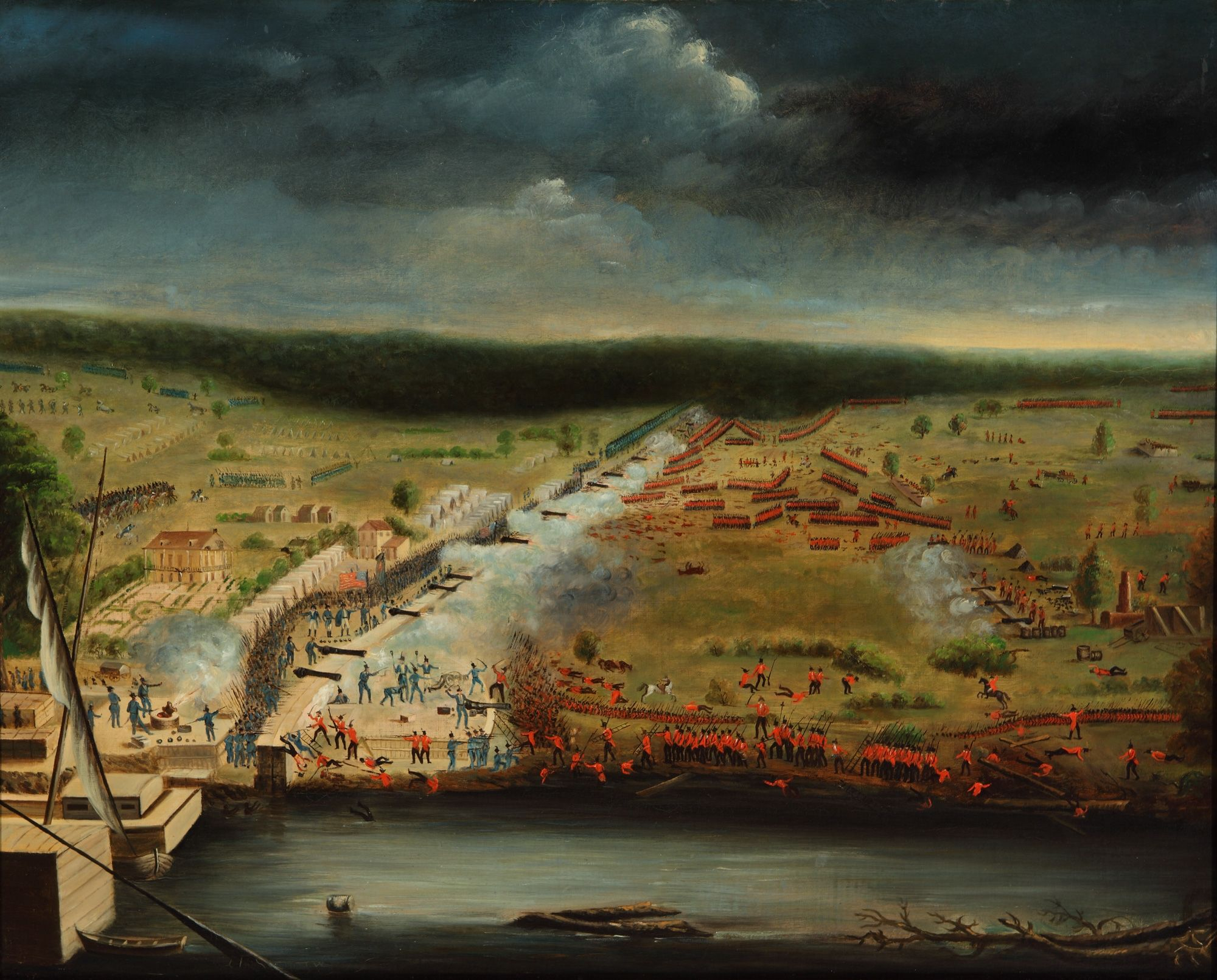
Battle of New Orleans by Jean Hyacinthe de Laclotte

- January 8 – War of 1812 – Battle of New Orleans: American forces under Andrew Jackson, John Coffee, and William Carroll, and John Adair defeat an invading British force.
- February – The Hartford Convention arrives in Washington, D.C.
- February 6 – New Jersey grants the first American railroad charter to a John Stevens.
- February 7–12 – War of 1812 – Second Battle of Fort Bowyer: British forces capture Fort Bowyer near Mobile, Alabama in what will be the last land battle between the Americans and British in the War of 1812. The British halt their advance two days later when informed of the Treaty of Ghent.
- February 15 – War of 1812 – The United States Senate ratifies the Treaty of Ghent.
- February 17 – War of 1812 ends.
- September 23 – The Great September Gale of 1815 is the first hurricane to strike New England in 180 years.
- December 25 – The Handel and Haydn Society, the oldest continuously performing arts organization in the U.S., gives its first performance, at the King's Chapel in Boston.

=== Undated ===
- The second wave of Amish immigration to North America begins.

=== Ongoing ===
- War of 1812 (1812–1815)

== Births ==
- January 10 John J. McRae, U.S. Senator from Mississippi from 1851 to 1852 (died 1868)
- January 16
  - Lemuel J. Bowden, U.S. Senator from Virginia from 1863 to 1864 (died 1864)
  - Henry Halleck, general (died 1872)
- January 18
  - Henry P. Haun, U.S. Senator from California from 1859 to 1860 (died 1860)
  - Richard Yates, U.S. Senator from Illinois from 1865 to 1871 (died 1873)
- January 21 – Horace Wells, dentist; anesthesia pioneer (died 1848)
- February 3 – Edward James Roye, 5th president of Liberia (d. 1872 in Liberia)
- March 9 – David Davis, U.S. Senator from Illinois from 1877 to 1883 (died 1886)
- April 1 – Henry B. Anthony, U.S. Senator from Rhode Island from 1859 to 1884 (died 1884)
- May 3 – Drusilla Wilson, American temperance leader and Quaker pastor (died 1908)
- May 10 – Henry Bibb, author and abolitionist who was born a slave (died 1854)
- May 18 – Thomas S. Bocock, United States Congressman, Speaker of the Confederate States House of Representatives (died 1891)
- June 1 – Philip Kearny, United States Army officer (died 1862)
- July 13 – James Seddon, 4th Confederate States Secretary of War (died 1880)
- September 1 – Emma Stebbins, sculptor (died 1882)
- September 7 – Howell Cobb, President of the C.S. Provisional Congress (died 1868)
- September 8 – Alexander Ramsey, 2nd governor of Minnesota from 1860 to 1863 and U.S. Senator from Minnesota from 1863 to 1875 (died 1903)
- September 12 – Richard S. Rust, abolitionist (died 1906)
- September 19 – Charles B. Mitchel, U.S. Senator from Arkansas from 1862 to 1864 (died 1864)
- October 29 – Dan Emmett, songwriter (died 1904)
- November 1 – Crawford Long, American surgeon and pharmacist (died 1878)
- November 12 – Elizabeth Cady Stanton, suffragist (died 1902)
- November 15 – John Banvard, panorama painter (died 1891)
- November 17 – Eliza Farnham, novelist and reformer (died 1864)
- December 31 – George Meade, general (died 1872)

== Deaths ==
- February 24 – Robert Fulton, inventor (born 1765)
- April 21 – Joseph Winston, patriot and Congressman from North Carolina (born 1746)
- May 8 – David Ramsay, Member of the United States Continental Congress from South Carolina (born 1749)
- September 9 – John Singleton Copley, painter (born 1738; died in London)
- September 24 – John Sevier, soldier, frontiersman, politician, and one of the founding fathers of the State of Tennessee (born 1745)
- October 21 – Stephen A. Hopkins, past speaker of the Louisiana House, shot and killed by an opponent in a lawsuit
- December 3 – John Carroll, first American Roman Catholic Archbishop (born 1735)

== See also ==
- Timeline of United States history (1790–1819)
