= Ralph I. Ingersoll =

American politician (1789–1872)

Ralph Isaacs Ingersoll

U.S. Minister to the Russian Empire
- In office August 8, 1846 – July 1, 1848
- President: James K. Polk
- Preceded by: Charles Stewart Todd
- Succeeded by: Arthur P. Bagby

Member of the U.S. House of Representatives from Connecticut's at-large district
- In office March 4, 1825 – March 3, 1833
- Preceded by: Samuel A. Foot
- Succeeded by: Samuel A. Foot

4th Speaker of the Connecticut House of Representatives
- In office 1824–1824
- Preceded by: Seth Preston Beers
- Succeeded by: Samuel A. Foot

Member of the Connecticut House of Representatives
- In office 1820–1825

Personal details
- Born: February 8, 1789 New Haven, Connecticut, U.S.
- Died: August 26, 1872 (aged 83) New Haven, Connecticut, U.S.
- Resting place: Grove Street Cemetery
- Party: Toleration (1820–1825); Anti-Jacksonian (1825–1833)
- Spouse: Margaret Van den Heuvel (m. 1814)
- Children: 7, including Charles Roberts, Colin Macrae
- Parent(s): Jonathan Ingersoll; Grace Isaacs Ingersoll
- Relatives: Charles A. Ingersoll (brother)
- Education: Yale College

Ralph Isaacs Ingersoll (February 8, 1789 – August 26, 1872) was a lawyer, politician, and diplomat who served as a member of the Connecticut House of Representatives, where he was Speaker of the House, a United States representative from Connecticut for four consecutive terms from 1825 to 1833, and was the U.S. Minister to the Russian Empire under President James K. Polk in the late 1840s.

== Early life ==
Ingersoll was born in New Haven, Connecticut, on February 8, 1789. He was the son of Judge Jonathan Ingersoll (1747–1823) and Grace (née Isaacs) Ingersoll (1772–1850). His father was a judge of the Supreme Court and Lieutenant Governor of Connecticut up until his death in 1823.

His maternal grandfather, and namesake, was Ralph Isaacs Jr., a Yale educated merchant who was prominent in New Haven and Branford, and his paternal grandfather was Rev. Jonathan Ingersoll, chaplain for the Connecticut Troops during the French and Indian War who was the brother of Jared Ingersoll Sr., a British colonial official. His grand-uncle's son, Jared Ingersoll, served as Attorney General of Pennsylvania and was the father of fellow U.S. Representative, Charles Jared Ingersoll, and grandfather of his second cousin, author Edward Ingersoll. His cousin, Ralph Isaacs III, was the father of Mary Esther Malbone Isaacs, who married Chancellor and U.S. Senator Nathan Sanford in 1813.

He pursued classical studies, and was graduated from Yale College in 1808. He studied law and was admitted to the bar in 1810 and commenced practice in New Haven.

== Career ==
Ingersoll was a member of the State house of representatives from 1820 until 1825 and served as speaker during the last two years. He was elected as an Adams candidate to the Nineteenth and Twentieth Congresses and reelected as an Anti-Jacksonian to the Twenty-first and Twenty-second Congresses, serving from March 4, 1825, until March 3, 1833. He was not a candidate for renomination in 1832.

He resumed the practice of law and was later appointed State's attorney for New Haven County in 1833. He declined the appointment as United States Senator tendered by Governor Henry W. Edwards upon the death of Senator Nathan Smith in 1835.

On August 8, 1846, he was appointed by Democratic President James K. Polk (the former Speaker of the House of Representatives) to serve as the sixteenth U.S. Minister to the Russian Empire. He presented his credentials in Russia on May 30, 1847, and served until he resigned and left his post on July 1, 1848. He was elected as a member of the American Philosophical Society in 1848. He again engaged in the practice of law and was Mayors of New Haven in 1851.

== Personal life ==
In 1814, Ingersoll married Margaret Catharine Eleanora Van den Heuvel (1790–1878). Margaret was the daughter of Charlotte Augusta (née Apthorp) and Jan Cornelis Van den Heuvel, the former governor of the Dutch province of Demerara from 1765 to 1770 who later moved to New York. Her maternal grandfather was prominent New York landowner Charles Ward Apthorp and her siblings included younger sisters, Maria Eliza van den Heuvel, who married John Church Hamilton (son of U.S. Treasury Secretary Alexander Hamilton), and Susan Augusta Van den Heuvel, the mother of Charlotte Augusta Gibbes, wife of John Jacob Astor III, from her marriage to Thomas Stanyarne Gibbes II. Together, Ralph and Margaret were the parents of seven children:

- John Van den Heuvel Ingersoll (1815–1846), a Yale educated lawyer who edited a political paper in Ohio and served as secretary of the Indian Commission. He drowned during a fishing excursion on Lake Erie.
- Ralph Apthorp Ingersoll
- Colin Macrae Ingersoll (1819–1903), who was also a member of Congress from Connecticut from 1851 to 1855. He married Julia Harriet Pratt, the daughter of U.S. Representative Zadock Pratt.
- Charles Roberts Ingersoll (1821–1903), who served as Governor of Connecticut from 1873 to 1877. He married Virginia Gregory, the daughter of Admiral Francis Gregory.
- Grace Suzette Ingersoll (1823–1904)
- William Adrian Ingersoll (1825–1865), a paymaster with the U.S. Navy.
- Justine Henrietta Ingersoll (1827–1832), who died young.

Ingersoll died in New Haven on August 26, 1872, and was buried in Grove Street Cemetery.

U.S. House of Representatives
Preceded by Samuel A. Foot	Member of the U.S. House of Representatives from Connecticut's at-large congressional district 1825–1833	Succeeded by Samuel A. Foot
Diplomatic posts
Preceded by Charles Stewart Todd	U.S. Minister to the Russian Empire; 1846–1848	Succeeded by Arthur P. Bagby
Political offices
Preceded by David Daggett	Mayor of New Haven, Connecticut; 1830–1831, 1851	Succeeded by Dennis Kimberly
