= Charles A. Ingersoll =

American judge (1798–1860)

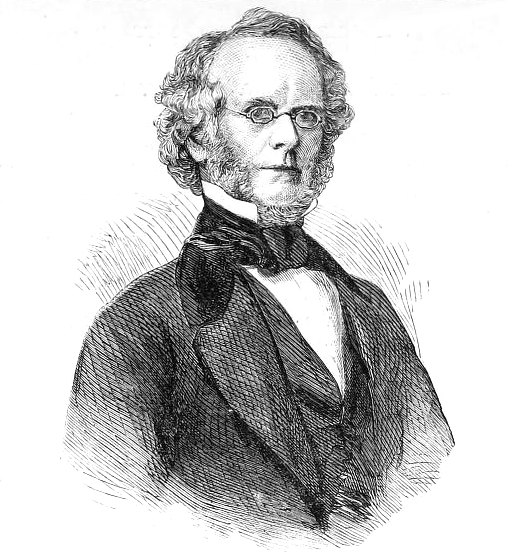

Judge of the United States District Court for the District of Connecticut
- In office April 8, 1853 – January 12, 1860
- Appointed by: Franklin Pierce
- Preceded by: Andrew T. Judson
- Succeeded by: William Davis Shipman

Personal details
- Born: Charles Anthony Ingersoll; October 19, 1798 New Haven, Connecticut, US
- Died: January 12, 1860 (aged 61) New Haven, Connecticut, US
- Resting place: Grove Street Cemetery, New Haven
- Parent: Jonathan Ingersoll (father)
- Relatives: Ralph Isaacs Ingersoll
- Education: Yale University (A.M.) read law

Charles Anthony Ingersoll (October 19, 1798 – January 12, 1860) was a United States district judge of the United States District Court for the District of Connecticut and member of the prominent Ingersoll political family of Connecticut.

== Education and career ==
Born on October 19, 1798, in New Haven, Connecticut, Ingersoll read law to be admitted to the bar, and received an Artium Magister degree from Yale University in 1827. He entered private practice in New Haven and was clerk of court for the United States District Court and the United States Circuit Court for the District of Connecticut from 1820 to 1853. He was a probate judge in New Haven from 1829 to 1853. He was a state's attorney for Connecticut from 1849 to 1853.

== Federal judicial service ==
Ingersoll was nominated by President Franklin Pierce on April 6, 1853, to a seat on the United States District Court for the District of Connecticut vacated by Judge Andrew T. Judson. He was confirmed by the United States Senate on April 8, 1853, and received his commission the same day. His service terminated on January 12, 1860, due to his death.

== Immediate family ==
Ingersoll was married to Henrietta Sidell (d. 1877), the daughter of the late John Sidell of New York. Together, they were the parents of:

- Charles Dennis Ingersoll (1843–1905), a Yale lawyer and judge in New York City who married Katherine Corse Sanders, in 1885.
- Thomas Chester Ingersoll (1845–1884), a Yale lawyer who died unmarried at the age of 39 of pneumonia.

=== Descendants ===
Through his son Charles, he was the grandfather of three, namely: Hamilton Ingersoll (1888–1940), the father of Charles Barnum Ingersoll (1923–2004); Anita Ingersoll (1891–1970), who married Roger Medina Minton (1886–1954) in 1910, later divorced and she married stockbroker Walter Lee Gwynn (1881–1955), uncle of actor Fred Gwynne, in 1926; and Justine Ingersoll (d. 1984), who married Dr. Harold Sears Arnold (d. 1951).

== Ingersoll family ==
Ingersoll was the son of Judge Jonathan Ingersoll (1747–1823) and Grace (née Isaacs) Ingersoll (1772–1850). His father was a judge of the Supreme Court and Lieutenant Governor of Connecticut up until his death in 1823. Among his siblings was older brother Ralph Isaacs Ingersoll, who served as a United States representative from Connecticut for four consecutive terms from 1825 to 1833, and was the United States Minister to the Russian Empire under President James K. Polk.

Ingersoll's maternal grandfather, and his brother's namesake, was Ralph Isaacs Jr., a Yale educated merchant who was prominent in New Haven and Branford, and his paternal grandfather was Reverend Jonathan Ingersoll, chaplain for the Connecticut Troops during the French and Indian War who was the brother of Jared Ingersoll Sr., a British colonial official. His grand-uncle's son, Jared Ingersoll, served as Attorney General of Pennsylvania and was the father of fellow United States Representative Charles Jared Ingersoll, and grandfather of his second cousin, author Edward Ingersoll. His cousin, Ralph Isaacs III, was the father of Mary Esther Malbone Isaacs, who married Chancellor and United States Senator Nathan Sanford in 1813.

== Sources ==
Legal offices
Preceded by Andrew T. Judson	Judge of the United States District Court for the District of Connecticut; 1853–1860	Succeeded by William Davis Shipman
