= Judge Shipman =

Judge Shipman may refer to:

- Nathaniel Shipman (1828–1906), judge of the United States Court of Appeals for the Second Circuit
- William Davis Shipman (1818–1898), judge of the United States District Court for the District of Connecticut
