= Jonathan Ingersoll =

American politician (1747–1823)

29th Lieutenant Governor of Connecticut
- In office May 9, 1816 – January 12, 1823
- Governor: John Cotton Smith; Oliver Wolcott Jr.
- Preceded by: Chauncey Goodrich
- Succeeded by: David Plant

Member-elect of the U.S. House of Representatives from Connecticut's at-large district
- Declined to serve
- Preceded by: Seat established
- Succeeded by: Uriah Tracy

Personal details
- Born: April 16, 1747 Ridgefield, Connecticut, British America
- Died: January 12, 1823 (aged 75) New Haven, Connecticut, U.S.
- Resting place: Grove Street Cemetery
- Party: Democratic-Republican (Before 1817); Toleration (1817–1823)
- Spouse: Grace Isaacs (m. 1786)
- Children: 10, including Ralph, Charles
- Relatives: Jared Ingersoll Sr. (uncle); Jared Ingersoll (cousin)
- Education: Yale University (BA)

Jonathan Ingersoll (April 16, 1747 – January 12, 1823) was a Connecticut politician of the late eighteenth and early nineteenth centuries.

== Early life ==
Ingersoll was born on April 16, 1747, in Ridgefield in what was then called the Province of Connecticut, a part of British America. He was the son of Rev. Jonathan Ingersoll (1713–1778) and Dorcas (née Moss) Ingersoll (1725–1811). His father was the chaplain for the Connecticut Troops during the French and Indian War. His sister, Esther Ingersoll, was married to Lt. Ebenezer Olmsted.

His uncle was Jared Ingersoll Sr., a British colonial official, and his cousin, Jared Ingersoll, served as Attorney General of Pennsylvania. His cousin's son (his first cousin once removed), Charles Jared Ingersoll, was a U.S. representative and the father of author Edward Ingersoll.

He graduated from Yale College in 1766 and began practicing as a lawyer.

== Career ==
From 1792 until 1797, he was a member of Connecticut council of assistants; he simultaneously served as a judge of the Connecticut Supreme Court of Errors from 1792 to 1798.

On September 16, 1793, he was elected as a member representing his state at-large in the United States House of Representatives, by a special election (to replace Congressman-elect Benjamin Huntington who had become a Judge). However he declined this office before the 3rd Congress convened, so he was never sworn in. A replacement was elected at a special election on November 11, 1793. He served as Superior court judge in Connecticut, 1798–1801 and 1811–1816.

Ingersoll was the ninth Lieutenant Governor of the State of Connecticut, and twenty-ninth overall, being elected to the office annually from 1816 to 1822, and serving until his death in 1823.

== Personal life ==
On April 1, 1786, he was married to Grace Isaacs (1772–1850), the daughter of Ralph Isaacs, Jr., a Yale educated merchant who was prominent in New Haven and Branford. Together, they were the parents of:

- Grace Ingersoll (1787–1816), who married Peter Grellet and died aged 29 in Paris, France.
- Ralph Isaacs Ingersoll (1789–1872), a U.S. representative from Connecticut who served as the U.S. Minister to the Russian Empire under President James K. Polk.
- Mary Ingersoll (1791–1842)
- William Isaacs Ingersoll (1793–1830)
- Charles Jared Ingersoll (1795–1795), who died in infancy.
- Charles Anthony Ingersoll (1798–1860), a United States federal judge nominated by President Franklin Pierce.
- Harriet Ingersoll (1798–1872)
- Jonathan Ingersoll (1803–1875)
- Edward Ingersoll (1809–1809), who died in infancy.
- Edward Ingersoll (1810–1883), an Episcopal minister in Buffalo, New York.

Ingersoll died while in office on January 12, 1823, in New Haven, Connecticut. He was buried in Grove Street Cemetery in New Haven.

=== Descendants ===
Through his son Ralph, he was the grandfather of seven, including John Van den Heuvel Ingersoll (1815–1846), a Yale educated lawyer who edited a political paper in Ohio and served as secretary of the Indian Commission, Colin Macrae Ingersoll (1819–1903), who was a member of Congress from Connecticut and married Julia Harriet Pratt, the daughter of U.S. Representative Zadock Pratt, and Charles Roberts Ingersoll (1821–1903), who served as Governor of Connecticut from 1873 to 1877 and married Virginia Gregory, the daughter of Admiral Francis Gregory.

Through his son Charles, he was the grandfather of Charles Dennis Ingersoll (1843–1905), a lawyer in New York City, and Thomas Chester Ingersoll (1845–1884).

U.S. House of Representatives
New seat	Member-elect of the U.S. House of Representatives from Connecticut's at-large congressional district 1793	Succeeded by Uriah Tracy
Political offices
Preceded by Chauncey Goodrich	Lieutenant Governor of Connecticut; 1816–1823	Succeeded by David Plant
