= Heuvel (surname) =

Heuvel is a Dutch surname that may be used with various tussenvoegsels (van den, van, olde, ten). It may be either a topographic surname for someone who lived on/by/under a hill, or a toponymic surname associated with a place named Heuvel, De Heuvel, etc. Cognates: Hövel, van den Höfel, van den Hövel, van den Höövel, vom Hövel, Höfel, Höfl.

Notable people with this surname include (tussenvoegsels are ignored during sorting by surname):

- Alicia Vanden Heuvel, American musician and producer based in the San Francisco Bay Area
- André van den Heuvel (1927–2016), Dutch actor
- Andrew Vanden Heuvel, American astronomer and science educator
- Antoon van den Heuvel
- Arturo ten Heuvel, Dutch footballer
- Carlien Dirkse van den Heuvel, Dutch field hockey player
- Cor van den Heuvel (1931–2024), American poet
- Dani van den Heuvel, Dutch footballer
- Ed van den Heuvel (born 1940), Dutch astronomer
- Elly Blanksma-van den Heuvel (born 1959), Dutch politician
- Eric Heuvel, Dutch cartoonist
- Erica van den Heuvel or Erica van Dijck, Dutch badminton player
- Carlien Dirkse van den Heuvel, Dutch field hockey player
- Frederick Vanden Heuvel (died 1963), British intelligence officer
- Ien van den Heuvel (1927–2010), Dutch politician
- Jan van den Heuvel, founder of J. L. van den Heuvel Orgelbouw – Dutch pipe organ builders
- Jan Cornelis Van den Heuvel (1742–1826), Dutch politician
- John van den Heuvel (born 1962), Dutch crime journalist
- Jules Van den Heuvel, Belgian politician
- Katrina vanden Heuvel (born 1959), American editor and publisher
- Koen Van den Heuvel (born 1964), Belgian politician
- Laurens ten Heuvel, Dutch footballer and coach
- Machiel van den Heuvel, Dutch soldier
- Frederick Vanden Heuvel (died 1963), British intelligence officer
- Remco olde Heuvel, Dutch former speed skater
- Sophie Van De Heuvel, Australian rules footballer
- Theodorus Jacobus van den Heuvel, Dutch trader
- Wouter olde Heuvel (born 1986), Dutch former speed skater
- William vanden Heuvel (1930–2021), American attorney, businessman, and diplomat

== See also ==
- 3091 van den Heuvel
