= De Heuvel =

De Heuvel is the name of several locations in the Netherlands:

- De Heuvel, Gelderland
- De Heuvel, North Brabant

See also:

- De Heuvels, a hamlet near Kampen
