= Attorney General Ingersoll =

Attorney General Ingersoll may refer to:

- Jared Ingersoll (1749–1822), Attorney General of Pennsylvania
- Robert G. Ingersoll (1833–1899), Attorney General of Illinois
