= William Kneeland Townsend =

American judge (1849–1907)

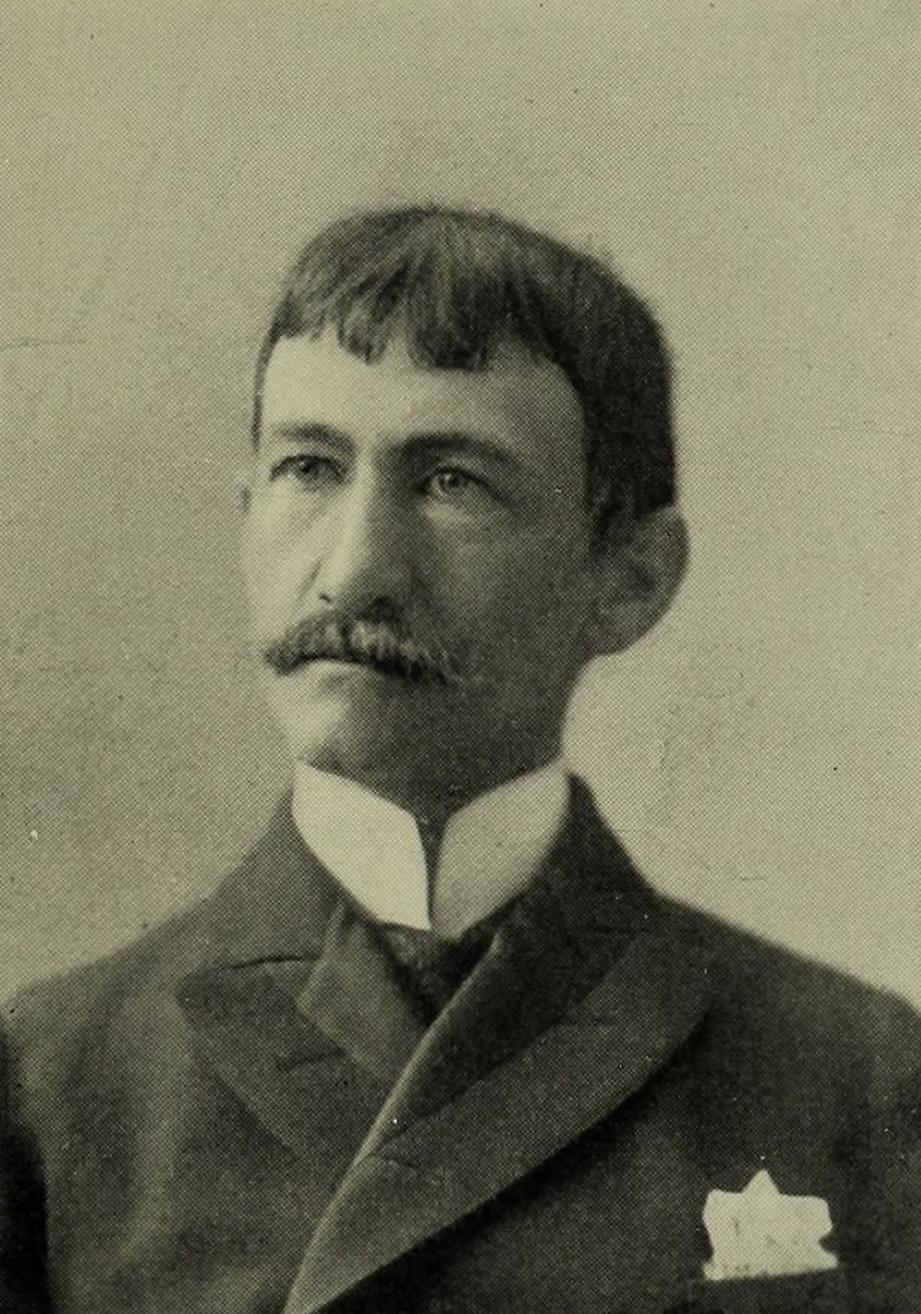

Judge of the United States Court of Appeals for the Second Circuit
- In office January 21, 1902 – June 2, 1907
- Appointed by: Theodore Roosevelt
- Preceded by: Nathaniel Shipman
- Succeeded by: Walter Chadwick Noyes

Judge of the United States Circuit Courts for the Second Circuit
- In office January 21, 1902 – June 2, 1907
- Appointed by: Theodore Roosevelt
- Preceded by: Nathaniel Shipman
- Succeeded by: Walter Chadwick Noyes

Judge of the United States District Court for the District of Connecticut
- In office March 28, 1892 – February 27, 1902
- Appointed by: Benjamin Harrison
- Preceded by: Nathaniel Shipman
- Succeeded by: James Perry Platt

Personal details
- Born: William Kneeland Townsend; June 12, 1849 New Haven, Connecticut, U.S.
- Died: June 2, 1907 (aged 57) New Haven, Connecticut, U.S.
- Education: Yale University (AB); Yale Law School (LLB, LLM, DCL)

William Kneeland Townsend (June 12, 1849 – June 2, 1907) was a United States circuit judge of the United States Court of Appeals for the Second Circuit and of the United States Circuit Courts for the Second Circuit and previously was a United States district judge of the United States District Court for the District of Connecticut.

== Education and career ==
Born on June 12, 1849, in New Haven, Connecticut, Townsend received an Artium Baccalaureus degree in 1871 from Yale University. He received a Bachelor of Laws in 1874, a Master of Laws in 1878, and a Doctor of Civil Law in 1880, all from Yale Law School. He was a member of Skull and Bones. He entered private practice in New Haven starting in 1875. He was an attorney for the New York, New Haven and Hartford Railroad until 1881. He was an Alderman for New Haven from 1880 to 1882. He was a professor at Yale Law School from 1881 to 1907. He was corporation counsel for New Haven from 1889 to 1891.

== Federal judicial service ==
Townsend was nominated by President Benjamin Harrison on March 24, 1892, to a seat on the United States District Court for the District of Connecticut vacated by Judge Nathaniel Shipman. He was confirmed by the United States Senate on March 28, 1892, and received his commission the same day. His service terminated on February 27, 1902, due to his elevation to the Second Circuit.

Townsend was nominated by President Theodore Roosevelt on January 15, 1902, to a joint seat on the United States Court of Appeals for the Second Circuit and the United States Circuit Courts for the Second Circuit vacated by Judge Nathaniel Shipman. He was confirmed by the Senate on January 21, 1902, and received his commission the same day. His service terminated on June 2, 1907 upon his death in New Haven.

== Sources ==
Legal offices
Preceded by Nathaniel Shipman	Judge of the United States District Court for the District of Connecticut; 1892–1902	Succeeded by James Perry Platt
Preceded by Nathaniel Shipman	Judge of the United States Circuit Courts for the Second Circuit; 1902–1907	Succeeded by Walter Chadwick Noyes
Preceded by Nathaniel Shipman	Judge of the United States Court of Appeals for the Second Circuit; 1902–1907	Succeeded by Walter Chadwick Noyes
