= Colin M. Ingersoll =

American politician (1819–1903)

Colin Macrae Ingersoll

Member of the U.S. House of Representatives from Connecticut's 2nd district
- In office March 4, 1851 – March 3, 1855
- Preceded by: Walter Booth
- Succeeded by: John Woodruff

Connecticut Adjutant General
- In office 1867–1868
- Preceded by: Charles T. Stanton
- Succeeded by: Samuel E. Merwin, Jr.
- In office 1870–1871
- Preceded by: Samuel E. Merwin, Jr.
- Succeeded by: Samuel E. Merwin, Jr.

Personal details
- Born: March 11, 1819 New Haven, Connecticut, U.S.
- Died: September 13, 1903 (aged 84) New Haven, Connecticut, U.S.
- Resting place: Grove Street Cemetery
- Party: Democratic
- Spouse: Julia Harriet Pratt (after 1853)
- Parent(s): Ralph Isaacs Ingersoll; Margaret Van den Heuvel
- Relatives: Charles R. Ingersoll (brother) Jan Cornelis van den Heuvel (grandfather)
- Education: Trinity College; Yale Law School

Colin Macrae Ingersoll (March 11, 1819 – September 13, 1903) was a Connecticut attorney, politician, and military leader. He served as a member of the United States House of Representatives for two terms in the 1850s.

== Early life ==
Ingersoll was born in New Haven, Connecticut on March 11, 1819, to diplomat and U.S. Representative Ralph Isaacs Ingersoll and Margaret (née Van den Heuvel) Ingersoll. His brother was Charles Roberts Ingersoll, who served as the 47th Governor of Connecticut.

His paternal grandfather was Jonathan Ingersoll, a judge of the Supreme Court and Lieutenant Governor of Connecticut up until his death in 1823. His maternal grandfather was Jan Cornelis Van den Heuvel, a Dutch born plantation owner and politician who served as governor of the Dutch province of Demerara from 1765 to 1770 and later became a merchant in New York City with the Dutch West India Company.

He pursued academic studies in New Haven, and graduated from Trinity College in 1839. Ingersoll was a founding member of the Phi Kappa Society while an undergraduate. This secret society would later become the school’s current chapter of the Alpha Delta Phi. He graduated from Yale Law School, was admitted to the bar in 1841, and practiced in New Haven.

== Career ==
In 1843, Ingersoll served as clerk of the Connecticut State Senate. When his father was Minister to Russia, Colin Ingersoll was appointed Secretary of the legation at St. Petersburg serving in 1847 and 1848. He was acting Chargé d'Affaires in 1848.

In 1850, Ingersoll was elected as a Democrat to the 32nd United States Congress. He served in Congress from March 4, 1851, was reelected two years later and served in the Thirty-third Congress until March 3, 1855.

After leaving Congress he resumed the practice of law. Ingersoll served as adjutant general of Connecticut from 1867 to 1868 and again from 1870 to 1871.

== Personal life ==
In 1853, Ingersoll married Julia Harriet Pratt, the daughter of Abigail P. (née Watson) Pratt and Zadock Pratt, a U.S. Representative from New York who built the largest tannery in the world at its time and built the town of Prattsville. Their children included:

- Mary E. Ingersoll (b. 1854)
- Colin Macrae Ingersoll Jr. (b. 1859)
- George Pratt Ingersoll (b. 1861)
- Maude Margaret Ingersoll (b. 1863)

Ingersoll died of pneumonia in New Haven, Connecticut on September 13, 1903. He was interred in New Haven's Grove Street Cemetery.

== External sources ==
- United States Congress. "Colin M. Ingersoll (id: I000016)". Biographical Directory of the United States Congress.
- Colin M. Ingersoll at Find a Grave

Military offices
Preceded by Charles T. Stanton	Connecticut Adjutant General; 1867–1868	Succeeded by Samuel E. Merwin, Jr.
Preceded by Samuel E. Merwin, Jr.	Connecticut Adjutant General; 1870–1871	Succeeded by Samuel E. Merwin, Jr.
U.S. House of Representatives
Preceded by Walter Booth	Member of the U.S. House of Representatives from Connecticut's 2nd congressional district 1851–1855	Succeeded by John Woodruff
