= Charles T. Stanton =

General Charles T. Stanton
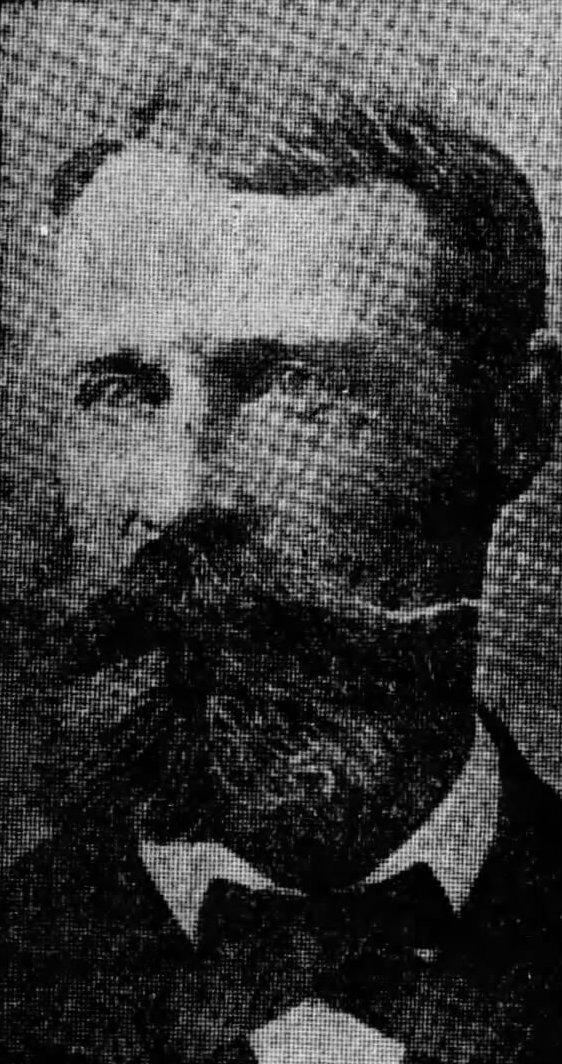
- Charles T. Stanton
- Born: November 30, 1839; Stonington, Connecticut
- Died: November 26, 1915 (aged 75); Stonington, Connecticut
- Military career
- Allegiance: United States
- Branch: United States Army
- Rank: Major General
- Commands: Connecticut State Militia
- Website: www.ct.gov/mil

Charles Thompson Stanton (November 30, 1839 – November 26, 1915) was the 14th Adjutant General of the State of Connecticut.

== Military career ==
In 1862 Stanton raised a company for service in the Civil War, was chosen its Captain and joined the 21st Reg. Connecticut Volunteer. Stanton was promoted to Major on 25 July 1864 and was discharged on 14 September 1864 on account of disability from wounds he received in action.

== Later life ==
In 1866 Stanton was appointed Connecticut Adjutant General, serving until 1867. He was brevetted Major and Lieutenant-Colonel, in the National Guard.

From 1869 to 1875 Stanton was engaged in sugar raising in Louisiana. Then he returned to Connecticut and was appointed collector of customs for the district of Stonington.

== Personal life ==
Stanton was born in Stonington, Connecticut. His parents were Charles Thompson Stanton and Nancy Lord Palmer. He had eight brothers and sisters:

- Samuel Rossiter Stanton (1838–1891)
- Hannah Palmer Stanton (1841–1886)
- Adelaide Palmer Stanton (1844–1931)
- Grace Noyes Stanton (1847–1891)
- Juliet Fanning Stanton (1847–1891)
- Joseph Warren Stanton (1851–1891)
- Nathaniel Palmer Stanton (1851–1891)
- a half-brother on his father's side.

Charles T. Stanton went to the University of Yale in 1857 and graduated in 1861. He was a rower at Yale, where he and his team won the college regatta in 1859.

Military offices
Preceded by Horace J. Morse	Connecticut Adjutant General; 1866–1867	Succeeded by Colin M. Ingersoll
