= Joseph D. Williams =

American general

General Joseph D. Williams
- Born: c. 1818; Lebanon, Connecticut, US
- Died: 1884
- Military career
- Allegiance: United States
- Branch: United States Army
- Rank: Major General
- Commands: Connecticut State Militia
- Website: www.ct.gov/mil

Joseph D. Williams, born in Lebanon, Connecticut in about 1818, was an American general. He was the twelfth Adjutant General of the State of Connecticut. He was elected to the Connecticut State Legislature, and was appointed Adjutant General and Paymaster General in 1855. He was a member of the Connecticut Historical Society, Good Templars, and son of the American Revolution, and he was a Republican.

== Military career ==
At the age of 18 Williams enlisted in the East Hartford Artillery Company. In 1855, he was elected as Connecticut Adjutant General by Governor W. T Minor after the last two Adjutants resigned early because they did not agree with orders coming from Minor. Williams was overwhelmed with the Civil War recruiting and logistical demands and resigned in 1863. He died in June 1884 of heart disease.

== Personal life ==
He attended public schools in Hartford.

Military offices
Preceded by Justin Hodge	Connecticut Adjutant General; 1855–1862	Succeeded by Horace J. Morse
