= Emma Winner Rogers =

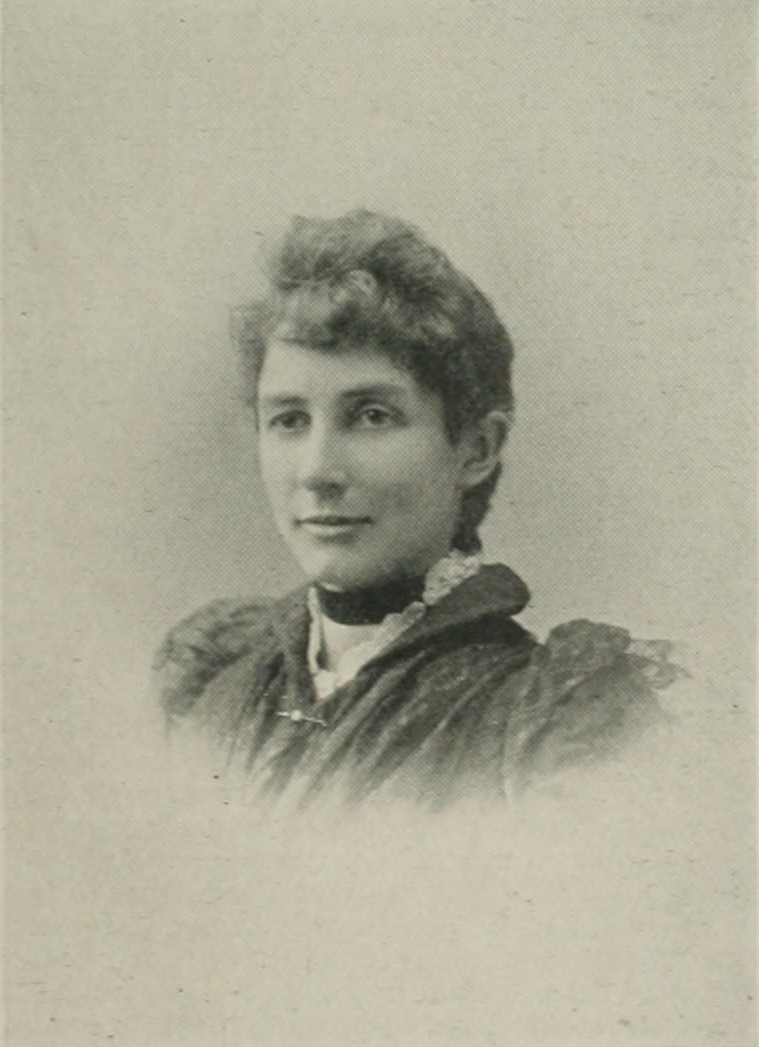
- Photo in A Woman of the Century
- Born: Emma Ferdon Winner; January 20, 1855; Plainfield, New Jersey, U.S.
- Died: March 3, 1922 (aged 67); New York City, New York, U.S.
- Education: University of Michigan (LittB)
- Occupations: writer, speaker, suffragist
- Spouse: Henry Wade Rogers (m. 1876)
- Writing career
- Subjects: economy; social issues; Arts and Crafts movement
- Notable work: The Journal of a Country Woman (1912)

Emma Winner Rogers (née, Winner; January 20, 1855 – March 3, 1922) was an American writer and speaker upon economic and social questions, and on the Arts and Crafts movement. She favored suffrage, and served as an officer of the National American Woman Suffrage Association. Among her published works can be counted Deaconesses in the early church; deaconesses in the modern church (1891), The social failure of the city (1898), The Journal of a Country Woman (1912), and Why not complete the enfranchisement of women (1912).

== Early life and education ==
Emma Ferdon Winner was born in Plainfield, New Jersey, January 20, 1855. She was the daughter of Rev. John Ogden Winner and Sarah J. (Taylor) Winner. Her father and grandfather, Rev. Isaac Winner, D. D., were clergymen of the Methodist Episcopal Church and natives of New Jersey. On the maternal side, she was the granddaughter and great-granddaughter of Moses Taylor, and Moses Taylor, second, during their lives successful business men of New York City.

She received her early education in New Jersey at private schools in Jersey City and Newark, before graduating from Pennington Seminary in Pennington. She earned a Litt. B. in 1891 from the University of Michigan.

== Career ==
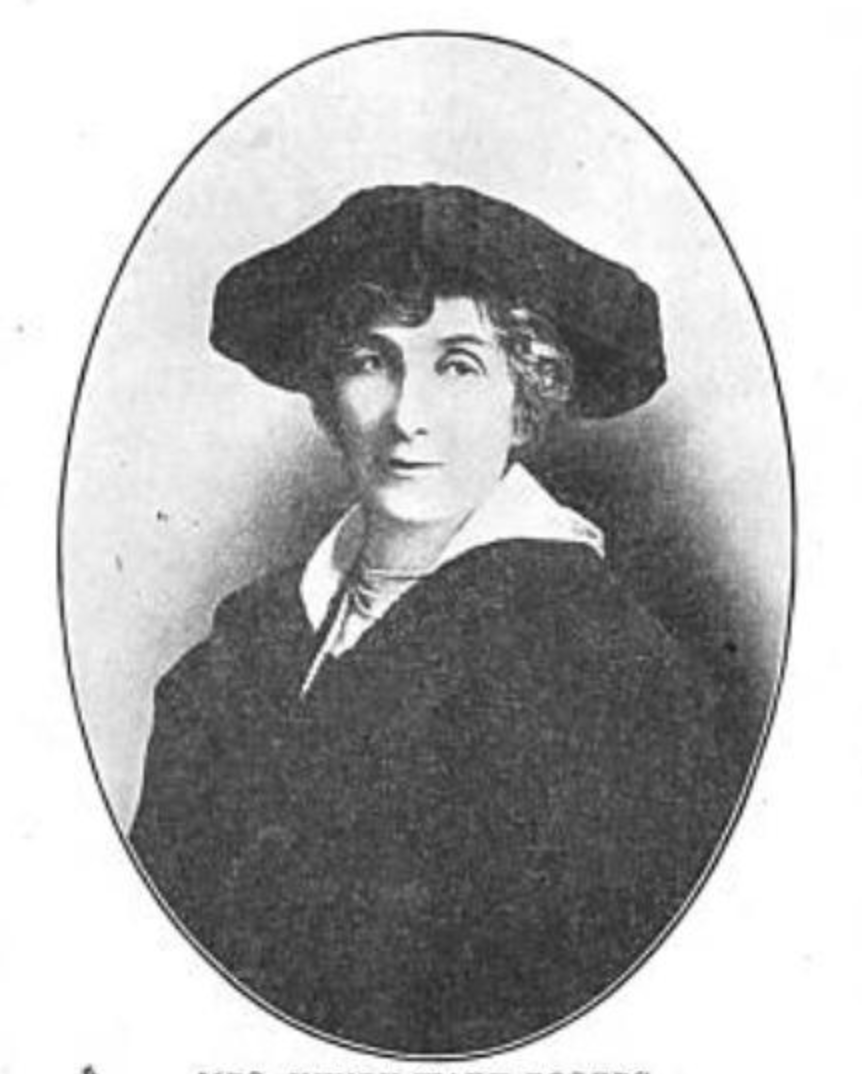
Rogers in 1917

For six years, she was the corresponding secretary of the Woman's Home Missionary Society of Detroit Conference, and later, the honorary president of the Rock River Conference Woman's Home Missionary Society. She was connected with the woman's work of the World's Columbian Exposition (1893), as the chair of the committee on municipal order, of the World's Congress Auxiliary. She served as president of the Northwestern University Settlement Association (1894–1900), and of the University Art Guild, Chicago and Evanston, Illinois (1895–1900). She was a member of Fortnightly of Chicago (president, 1898–1900); American Economic Association; the Collegiate Alumnae Association; and the Women's University Club (New York City).

Rogers was specially interested in literary work in the line of social science and political economy, and was a contributor on those subjects to various papers and periodicals. She wrote a monograph entitled "Deaconesses in Early and Modern Church".

Rogers favored suffrage. In 1920, she served as treasurer of the National American Woman Suffrage Association.

== Personal life ==
In 1876, she married Henry Wade Rogers, of Buffalo, New York, dean of the University of Michigan Law School, then the president of Northwestern University in Evanston, Illinois, and afterwards dean of Yale Law School.

Rogers died in New York City, March 3, 1922.

== Selected works ==
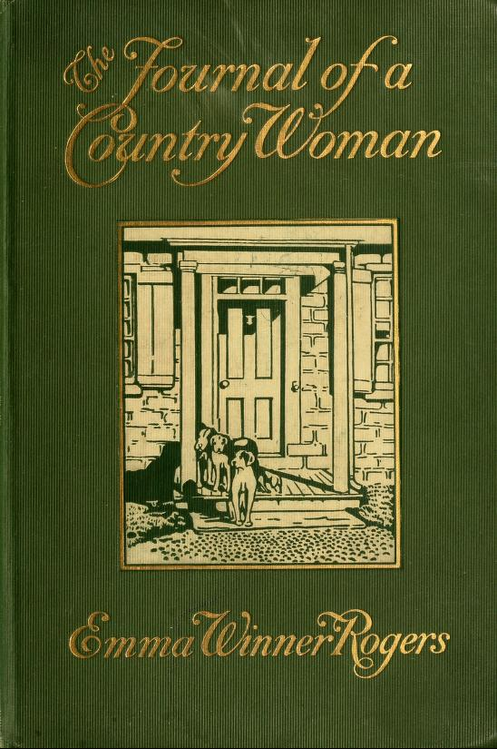
The Journal of a Country Woman, 1912

=== Books ===
- Deaconesses in the early church. Deaconesses in the modern church. 1891
- The social failure of the city , 1898
- The Journal of a Country Woman, 1912
- Why not complete the enfranchisement of women, 1912

=== Articles ===
- "Wanted—the woman's land army", 1918
