= William Rossell =

American judge (1760–1840)

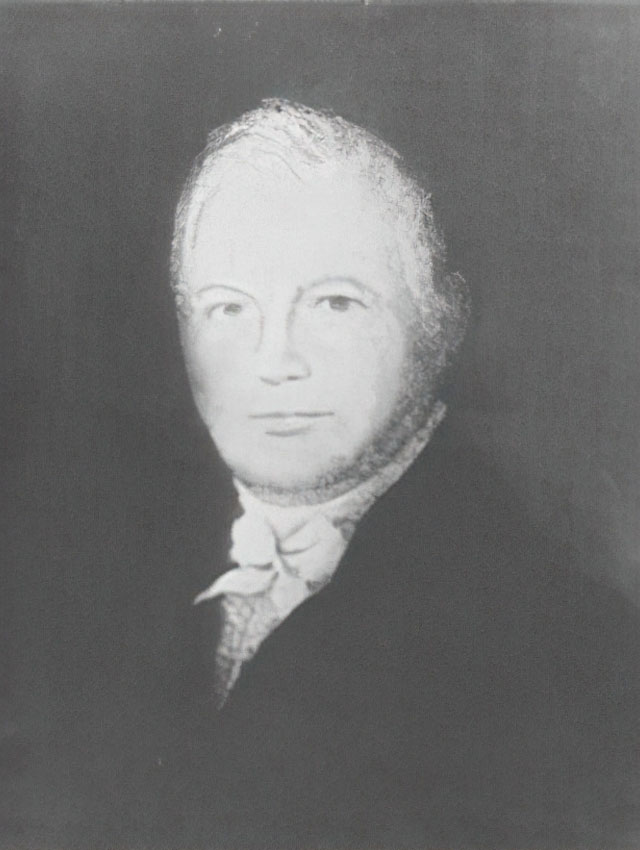

Judge of the United States District Court for the District of New Jersey
- In office November 10, 1826 – June 20, 1840
- Appointed by: John Quincy Adams
- Preceded by: William Sanford Pennington
- Succeeded by: Mahlon Dickerson

Personal details
- Born: William Rossell; October 25, 1760 Mount Holly, Province of New Jersey, British America
- Died: June 20, 1840 (aged 79) Mount Holly, New Jersey

William Rossell (October 25, 1760 – June 20, 1840) was a United States district judge of the United States District Court for the District of New Jersey.

== Education and career ==
Born in Mount Holly, Burlington County, Province of New Jersey, British America, Rossell was a Sergeant in the Continental Army during the American Revolutionary War, and thereafter was a farmer in Mount Holly, New Jersey. He was a Justice of the Peace in Burlington County from 1795 to 1796, and a Judge of the Burlington County Court of Common Pleas beginning in 1796. In 1801, he returned to farming and working as a millwright in Monmouth, New Jersey. He was a justice of the New Jersey Supreme Court from 1804 to 1826.

== Federal judicial service ==
Rossell received a recess appointment from President John Quincy Adams on November 10, 1826, to a seat on the United States District Court for the District of New Jersey vacated by Judge William Sanford Pennington. He was nominated to the same position by President Adams on December 13, 1826. He was confirmed by the United States Senate on December 19, 1826, and received his commission the same day. His service terminated on June 20, 1840, due to his death in Mount Holly.

== Sources ==
Legal offices
Preceded by William Sanford Pennington	Judge of the United States District Court for the District of New Jersey; 1826–1840	Succeeded by Mahlon Dickerson
