= Höfl =

Höfl or Hoefl is a German surname. Named after any of places named Hof, created with the diminutive suffix -l and umlaut. Notable people with this surname include:

- Hugo Höfl (1878–1957), German general
- Herbert Höfl, German speed skater
- Marcus Höfl, German sports manager
- Maria Höfl-Riesch (born 1984), German alpine skier
