= Justin Hodge =

Colonel Justin Hodge
- Born: April 21, 1815; Roxbury, Massachusetts
- Died: October 22, 1900 (aged 85); Barkhamsted, Connecticut
- Spouse: Lucia Hewitt
- Military career
- Allegiance: United States of America
- Branch: United States Army; Connecticut State Militia; Union Army
- Rank: Major General (Militia); Colonel, USV
- Unit: 1st Connecticut Infantry Regiment
- Commands: Adjutant General of Connecticut; 1st Corps d'Afrique Engineers; 95th U.S. Colored Infantry
- Conflicts: Mexican–American War; American Civil War: Siege of Port Hudson

Justin Hodge, born in Roxbury, Massachusetts on April 21, 1815, was a Connecticut politician who served in the state legislature for many years. He represented his hometown of Barkhamstead as a loyal member of the Democratic Party. He served in the U.S. Army during the Civil War as well as the Mexican War before that. He briefly served as the Adjutant General of Connecticut in 1855.

== Military career ==
During the Mexican–American War, Hodge was a captain of volunteers and served with General Winfield Scott at Vera Cruz. He was appointed to the position of Adjutant General of the Connecticut State Militia by Governor William T. Minor in August 1855. Upon appointment, he was ordered by the Governor to disband several companies of the state militia that were composed primarily of Irish immigrants. Hodge refused to execute the order and was removed from the office by the displeased governor. Joseph D. Williams was appointed Adjutant General and carried out the order. Justin Hodge is the shortest-serving Adjutant General in Connecticut's military history.

On April 23, 1861, he was appointed First Lieutenant in Company S of the 1st Connecticut Infantry Regiment. He spent most of the war serving under General Nathaniel P. Banks and the Army of the Gulf. In 1863 he was made Colonel of the 1st Louisiana Engineers Corps d'Afrique, which, because of its large numbers, was later split in two creating the 1st and 3rd Regiment Engineers, Corps d'Afrique (95th and 97th U.S. Colored Infantries). He commanded the 1st Regiment Engineers, Corps d'Afrique during the siege of Port Hudson. Colonel Hodge was mustered out of the volunteers on October 13, 1866

== Personal life ==
Hodge married Lucia Hewitt, daughter of Joshua Hewitt and Polly Williams of Winsted, Connecticut. His son, Kosky Hodge, served with him in the Civil War as a teenager. Justin died at his home on October 22, 1900.

Military offices
Preceded by John C. Hollister	Connecticut Adjutant General; 1855	Succeeded by fJoseph D. Williams
