= Horace J. Morse =

General Horace J. Morse
- Born: December 30, 1838; Norwalk, Huron County, Ohio
- Died: March 18, 1931 (aged 92); Brooklyn, New York
- Spouse: Frances E. Trask (1839–1917, his death)
- Military career
- Allegiance: United States
- Branch: United States Army
- Rank: Major general
- Commands: Connecticut State Militia
- Website: www.ct.gov/mil

Horace J. Morse, born in Norwalk, Huron County, Ohio, on December 30, 1838, was the thirteenth adjutant general of the State of Connecticut. In 1868 he became a partner in A.M. Kidder &Co. Amor M. Kidder, who founded the firm in 1865 and was succeeded as senior partner by Morse. Horace J. Morse was an organizer and former vice president of the People's Trust Company of Brooklyn. He also was a receiver for the Long Island Traction Company and president of the Iowa Central Railway. He worked in Wall Street for sixty-three years.

== Military career ==
At the age of 22, Morse was appointed quartermaster general on the staff of Governor Buckingham. Two years later Morse was appointed Connecticut Adjutant General, serving until the close of the war.

== Personal life ==
Morse's parents were Charles Aldro Morse and Lauretta Cooledge Smith. When Horace J. Morse was younger he lived in Lockport, New York, where he received his main education, and then attended Cambridge University in England. He later moved to Hartford, Connecticut, at the outbreak of the Civil War. In 1862 Morse married Frances E. Trask and they had one boy and one girl named Charles Lewis Morse and Alice L. Morse. Horace Morse was close friends with Senator Chauncey M. Depew. Horace J. Morse died at the age of 92 on March 18, 1930, in Brooklyn, New York, after being ill for two months. His wife died in 1917.

Military offices
Preceded by Joseph D. Williams	Connecticut Adjutant General; 1863–1865	Succeeded by Charles T. Stanton
