= Mahlon Dickerson =

American politician (1770–1853)

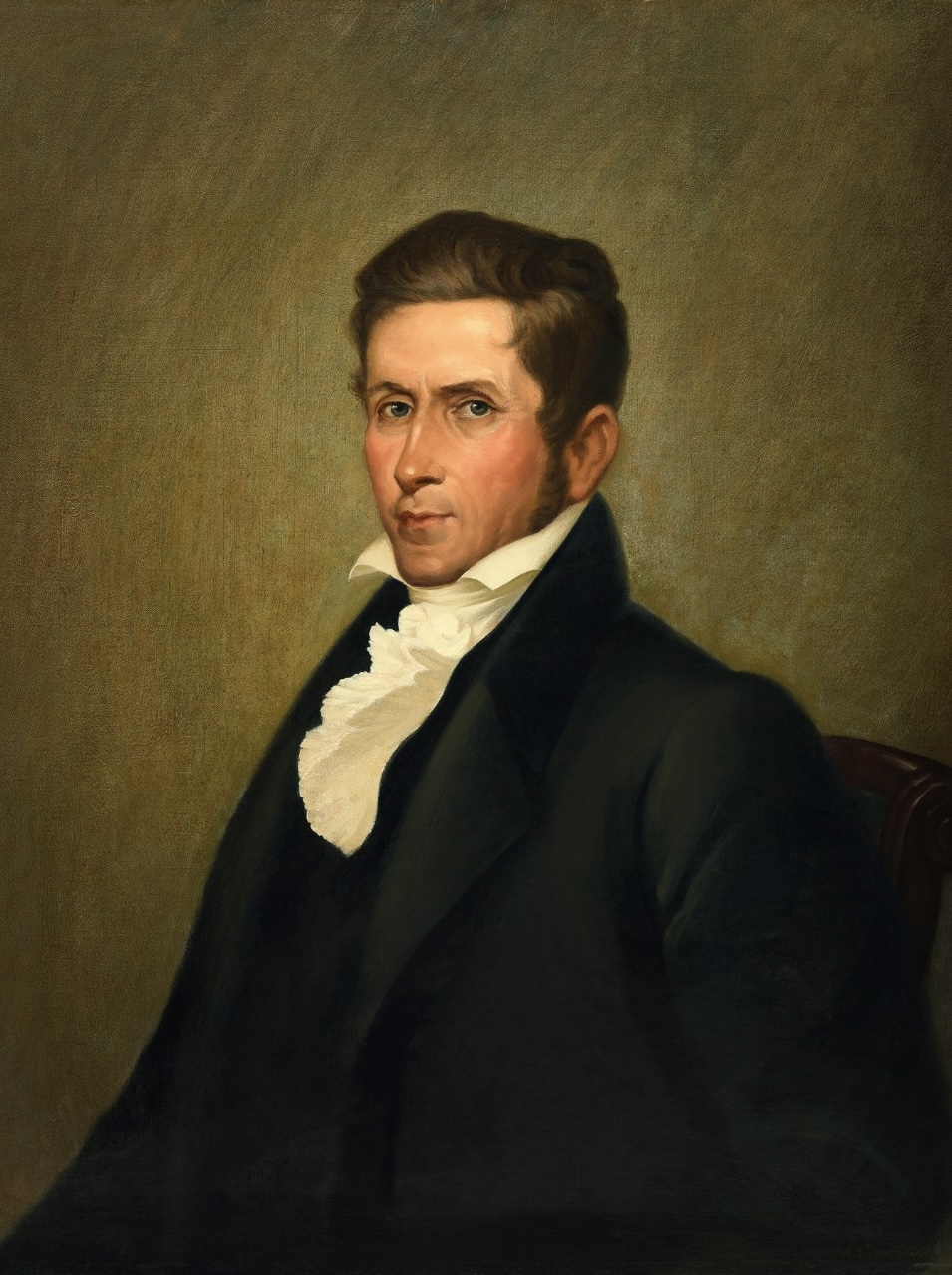

Judge of the United States District Court for the District of New Jersey
- In office July 23, 1840 – February 16, 1841
- Appointed by: Martin Van Buren
- Preceded by: William Rossell
- Succeeded by: Philemon Dickerson

10th United States Secretary of the Navy
- In office July 1, 1834 – June 30, 1838
- President: Andrew Jackson; Martin Van Buren
- Preceded by: Levi Woodbury
- Succeeded by: James Kirke Paulding

United States Senator from New Jersey
- In office January 30, 1829 – March 3, 1833
- Preceded by: Ephraim Bateman
- Succeeded by: Samuel L. Southard
- In office March 4, 1817 – January 30, 1829
- Preceded by: John Condit
- Succeeded by: Theodore Frelinghuysen

7th Governor of New Jersey
- In office October 26, 1815 – February 1, 1817
- Preceded by: William Kennedy (acting)
- Succeeded by: Isaac Halstead Williamson

Associate Justice of the New Jersey Supreme Court
- In office 1813–1815
- Preceded by: William Sanford Pennington
- Succeeded by: Samuel L. Southard

Member of the New Jersey General Assembly
- In office 1811–1813

Attorney General of Pennsylvania
- In office July 22, 1808 – January 9, 1809
- Governor: Thomas McKean; Simon Snyder
- Preceded by: Joseph McKean
- Succeeded by: Walter Franklin

Personal details
- Born: Mahlon Dickerson; April 17, 1770 Hanover Neck, Province of New Jersey, British America
- Died: October 5, 1853 (aged 83) Succasunna, New Jersey, U.S.
- Resting place: Presbyterian Cemetery; Succasunna, New Jersey, U.S.
- Party: Democratic-Republican; Crawford Republican; Jacksonian
- Relatives: Philemon Dickerson (brother)
- Education: Princeton University (A.B.) read law
- Profession: Attorney

Mahlon Dickerson (April 17, 1770 – October 5, 1853) was a justice of the Supreme Court of New Jersey, the seventh governor of New Jersey, United States Senator from New Jersey, the 10th United States Secretary of the Navy and a United States district judge of the United States District Court for the District of New Jersey.

== Early life ==
Dickerson was born on April 17, 1770, in Hanover Neck, Province of New Jersey, British America. He was the brother of Philemon Dickerson, a United States representative from New Jersey and Mahlon Dickerson's successor on the United States District Court for the District of New Jersey.

Dickerson was educated by private tutors, received an Artium Baccalaureus degree in 1789 from the College of New Jersey (now Princeton University) and read law in 1793.

== Career ==
He was admitted to the bar and entered private practice in Morristown, from 1793 to 1794, and from 1794 to 1796. He was a private in the New Jersey Detached Militia, Second Regiment of Cavalry in 1794, during the Whiskey Rebellion. He continued private practice in Philadelphia, Pennsylvania from 1797 to 1810. He was a miner and iron manufacturer in Morris County, New Jersey from 1810 to 1853. He served as a Judge of the Mayor's Court in Philadelphia. He was a member of the Philadelphia Common Council in 1799. He was a commissioner of bankruptcy for the Commonwealth of Pennsylvania in 1802. He was Adjutant-general for Pennsylvania from 1805 to 1808. He was city recorder for Philadelphia from 1808 to 1810. He was a member of the New Jersey General Assembly from 1811 to 1813. He was a justice of the Supreme Court of New Jersey from 1813 to 1815. He was reporter for the Supreme Court of New Jersey from 1813 to 1814. He was the 7th Governor of New Jersey from 1815 to 1817.

=== Congressional service ===
Dickerson was elected as a Democratic-Republican (later Crawford Republican and Jacksonian Democrat) from New Jersey to the United States Senate January 23, 1817. He was reelected in 1822 and served from March 4, 1817, to January 30, 1829, when he resigned upon being elected to the state's other Senate seat to fill the vacancy caused by the resignation of United States Senator Ephraim Bateman and served from January 30, 1829, to March 3, 1833. He was Chairman of the United States Senate Committee on the Library for the 15th United States Congress, Chairman of the United States Senate Committee on Commerce and Manufactures for the 16th through the 18th United States Congresses and Chairman of the United States Senate Committee on Manufactures for the 19th through the 22nd United States Congresses.

=== Later career ===
Dickerson was vice-president of the New Jersey Legislative Council in 1833. President Andrew Jackson initially appointed him as minister to Russia which Dickerson had accepted only to find out upon his arrival to Washington D.C. that Jackson instead decided to make him the 10th United States Secretary of the Navy in 1834. He was re-appointed by President Martin Van Buren and served from June 1834 to June 1838.

Dickerson was a delegate to the New Jersey Constitutional Convention in 1844.

=== Federal judicial service ===
Dickerson was nominated by President Martin Van Buren on July 14, 1840, to a seat on the United States District Court for the District of New Jersey vacated by Judge William Rossell. He was confirmed by the United States Senate on July 21, 1840, and received his commission on July 23, 1840. His service terminated on February 16, 1841, due to his resignation.

== Personal life ==
He died on October 5, 1853, in Succasunna, Morris County, New Jersey. He was interred in Presbyterian Cemetery in Succasunna.

=== Societies ===
In 1807, Dickerson was elected a member of the American Philosophical Society. During the 1820s, he was a member of the prestigious society, Columbian Institute for the Promotion of Arts and Sciences, who counted among their members former presidents Andrew Jackson and John Quincy Adams and many prominent men of the day, including well-known representatives of the military, government service, medical and other professions. In 1833, he was admitted to the Society of the Cincinnati in the State of New Jersey.

=== Legacy ===
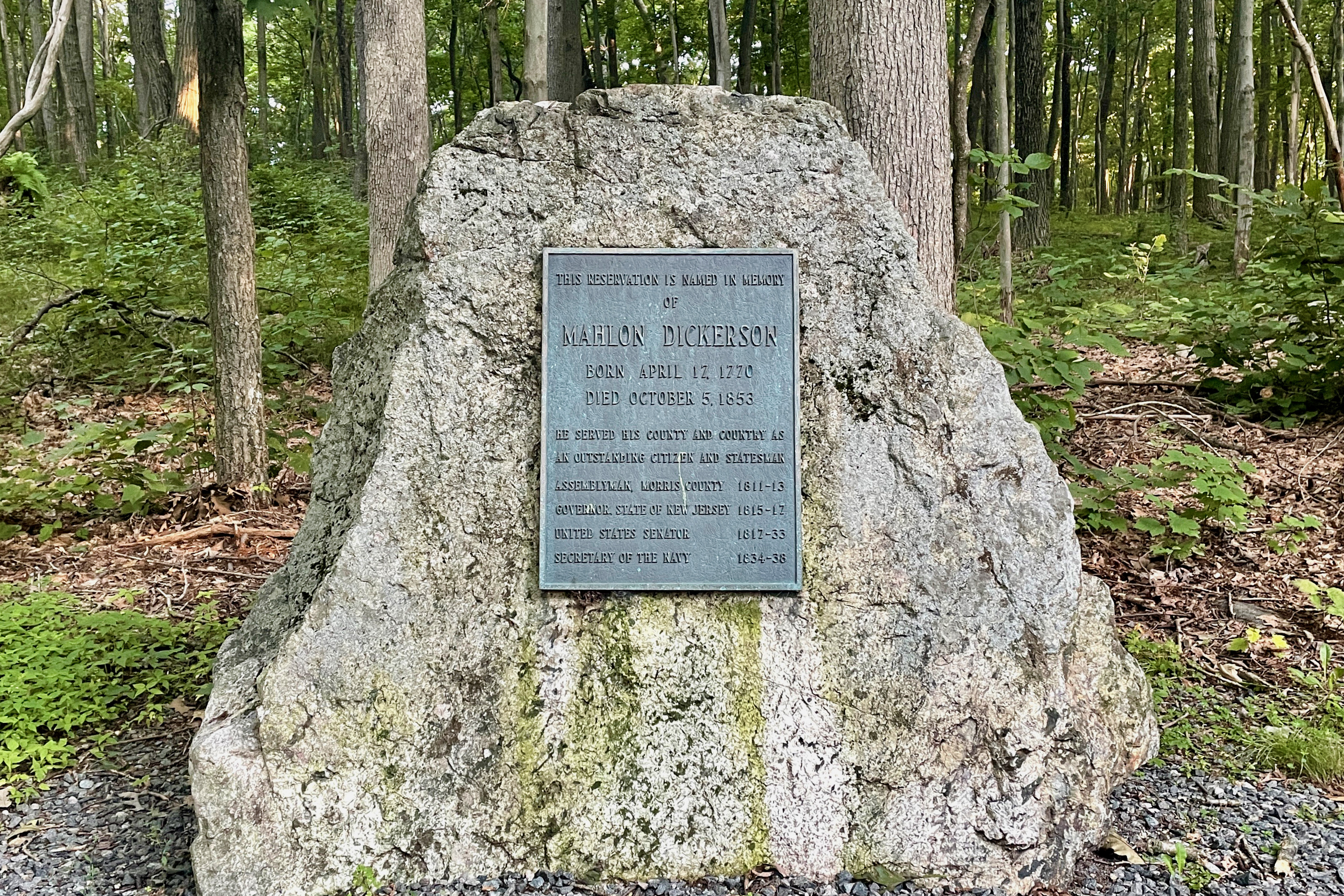
Mahlon Dickerson monument at the Morris County park

Mahlon Dickerson Reservation in Morris County is named after him.

== Sources ==
- United States Congress. "Mahlon Dickerson (id: D000308)". Biographical Directory of the United States Congress.
- Mahlon Dickerson at the Biographical Directory of Federal Judges, a publication of the Federal Judicial Center.

Legal offices
Preceded by Joseph McKean	Attorney General of Pennsylvania; 1808–1809	Succeeded by Walter Franklin
Preceded by William Rossell	Judge of the United States District Court for the District of New Jersey; 1840–1841	Succeeded by Philemon Dickerson
Political offices
Preceded by William Kennedy; Acting	7th Governor of New Jersey; 1815–1817	Succeeded by Isaac Halstead Williamson
Preceded by Levi Woodbury	10th United States Secretary of the Navy; 1834–1838	Succeeded by James Kirke Paulding
U.S. Senate
Preceded by John Condit	United States Senator (Class 2) from New Jersey; 1817–1829; Served alongside: James J. Wilson, Samuel L. Southard, Joseph McIlvaine, Ephraim Bateman	Succeeded by Theodore Frelinghuysen
Preceded by Nathan Sanford	Chairman of the Senate Commerce Committee; 1820–1825	Succeeded by James Lloyd
Preceded by Ephraim Bateman	United States Senator (Class 1) from New Jersey; 1829–1833; Served alongside: Theodore Frelinghuysen	Succeeded by Samuel L. Southard
