= Walter Chadwick Noyes =

American judge (1865–1926)

Judge of the United States Court of Appeals for the Second Circuit
- In office September 18, 1907 – July 1, 1913
- Appointed by: Theodore Roosevelt
- Preceded by: William Kneeland Townsend
- Succeeded by: Henry Wade Rogers

Judge of the United States Circuit Courts for the Second Circuit
- In office September 18, 1907 – December 31, 1911
- Appointed by: Theodore Roosevelt
- Preceded by: William Kneeland Townsend
- Succeeded by: Seat abolished

Personal details
- Born: Walter Chadwick Noyes; August 8, 1865 Lyme, Connecticut, U.S.
- Died: June 12, 1926 (aged 60) New York City, New York, U.S.
- Education: Cornell University read law

Walter Chadwick Noyes (August 8, 1865 – June 12, 1926) was a United States circuit judge of the United States Court of Appeals for the Second Circuit and of the United States Circuit Courts for the Second Circuit.

Noyes received a recess appointment from President Theodore Roosevelt on September 18, 1907, to a seat vacated by William Kneeland Townsend. nominated on December 3, 1907; He was confirmed by the United States Senate on December 10, 1907, and received commission on December 18, 1907. Noyes's service was terminated on July 1, 1913, due to resignation.

== Education and career ==
Born on August 8, 1865, in Lyme, Connecticut, Noyes attended Cornell University, then read law in 1886. He entered private practice in New London, Connecticut from 1886 to 1895. He was a Judge of the Connecticut Court of Common Pleas for New London County from 1895 to 1907.

== Federal judicial service ==
Noyes received a recess appointment from President Theodore Roosevelt on September 18, 1907, to a joint seat on the United States Court of Appeals for the Second Circuit and the United States Circuit Courts for the Second Circuit vacated by Judge William Kneeland Townsend. He was nominated to the same position by President Roosevelt on December 3, 1907. He was confirmed by the United States Senate on December 10, 1907, and received his commission on December 18, 1907. On December 31, 1911, the Circuit Courts were abolished and he thereafter served only on the Court of Appeals. His service terminated on July 1, 1913, due to his resignation.

== Later career and death ==
Following his resignation from the federal bench, Noyes resumed private practice in New York City, New York from 1913 to 1926. He died on June 12, 1926, in New York City.

== Sources ==
Legal offices
Preceded by William Kneeland Townsend	Judge of the United States Circuit Courts for the Second Circuit; 1907–1911	Succeeded by Seat abolished
Preceded by William Kneeland Townsend	Judge of the United States Court of Appeals for the Second Circuit; 1907–1913	Succeeded by Henry Wade Rogers
