= Joseph McKean =

American lawyer

Joseph Borden McKean

3rd Attorney General of Pennsylvania
- In office May 10, 1800 – July 22, 1808
- Governor: Thomas McKean
- Preceded by: Jared Ingersoll
- Succeeded by: Mahlon Dickerson

Personal details
- Born: July 28, 1764 New Castle, Delaware
- Died: September 3, 1826 (aged 62) Philadelphia, Pennsylvania
- Spouse: Hannah Miles
- Children: 8 survived to adulthood
- Education: Academy of Philadelphia
- Profession: Attorney, Judge

Joseph Borden McKean (July 28, 1764 – September 3, 1826) was a distinguished Philadelphia lawyer and judge. He served as state Pennsylvania Attorney General when appointed by his father, Governor Thomas McKean, and like his father, also served as presiding judge of the District Court of Philadelphia.

== Biography and career ==
McKean was the first child of Thomas McKean and Mary Borden. Mary died in 1773 when Joseph was 9, and upon remarriage, the family moved to Philadelphia. During the War the elder McKean was a prominent patriot—among other things, he was a signer of the Declaration of Independence—and the family was given the house of a vacated Brit.

McKean attended the Academy of Philadelphia, graduating in 1782. He was admitted to the bar and began practicing law in 1785.

McKean served as state Attorney General (1800–1808) appointed by his father, the governor, and later served (1814–1826) as a justice of the city of Philadelphia District Court, including two terms as presiding judge (1818–1821, 1825–1826).

In 1824, McKean was elected as a member to the American Philosophical Society.

Like his father, McKean served as a trustee of the University of Pennsylvania (1794–1826). They served jointly until his father's death in 1817.

== Marriage and children ==
McKean married Hannah Miles in 1786. Their children were Mary, Catherine, Samuel Miles, Thomas, Joseph Kirkbridge, Elizabeth, Ann, Letitia, William Wister, Letitia Henrietta, Caroline, Adeline Julia.

Joseph would study law, but not practice, ending up working for the Federal Treasury. William joined the navy at a young age, and ended up as an officer with the rank of Commodore.

Hannah survived her husband by 19 years, dying in 1845.

Legal offices
Preceded by Jared Ingersoll	Attorney General of Pennsylvania; 1800–1808	Succeeded by Mahlon Dickerson
