= Henry Wade Rogers =

American judge (1853–1926)

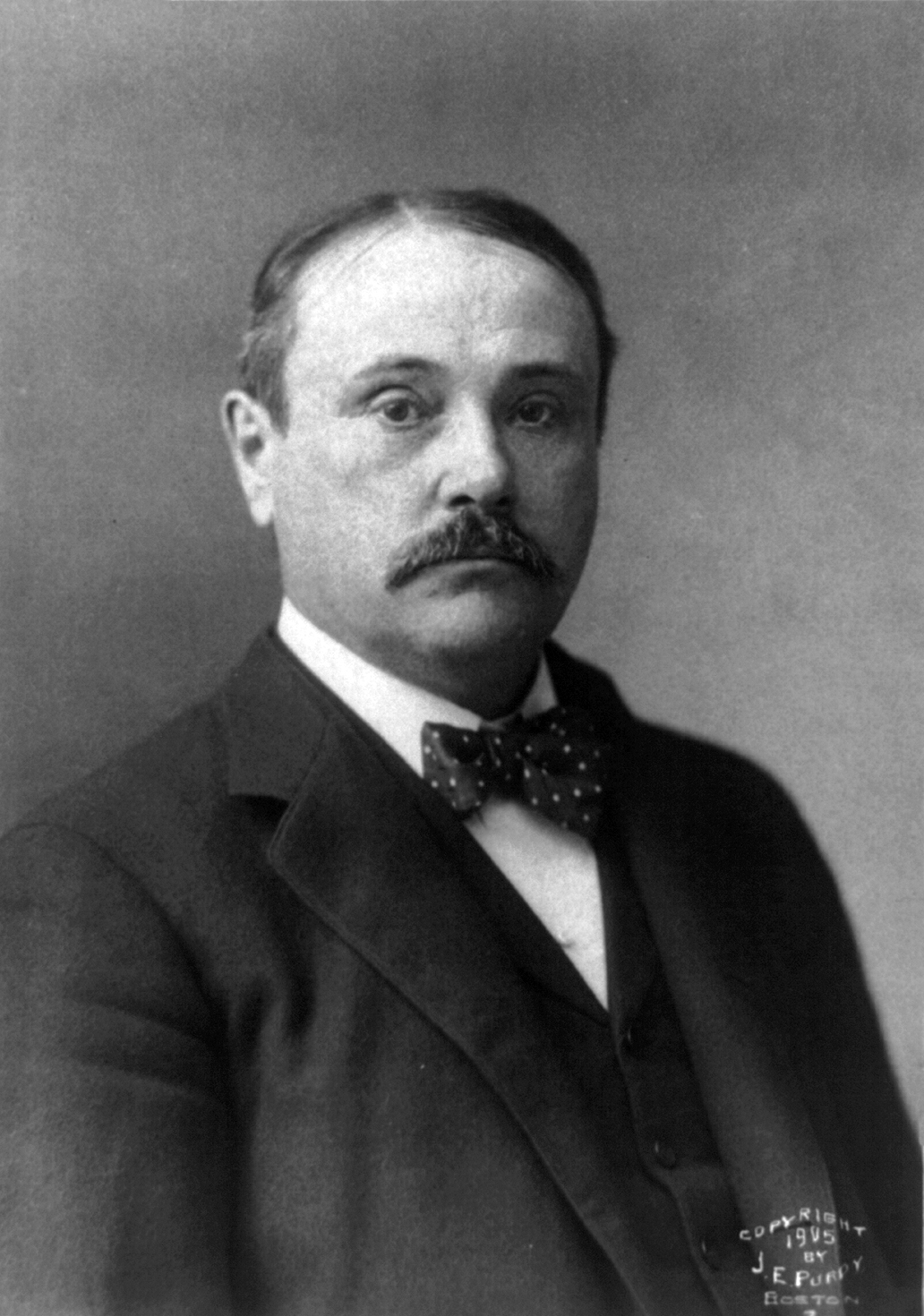
- Rogers in 1905

Judge of the United States Court of Appeals for the Second Circuit
- In office September 29, 1913 – August 16, 1926
- Appointed by: Woodrow Wilson
- Preceded by: Walter Chadwick Noyes
- Succeeded by: Thomas Walter Swan

2nd Dean of Yale Law School
- In office 1903–1916
- Preceded by: Francis Wayland III
- Succeeded by: Thomas Walter Swan

6th President of Northwestern University
- In office 1890–1900
- Preceded by: Oliver Marcy (acting)
- Succeeded by: Daniel Bonbright (interim)

4th Dean of University of Michigan Law School
- In office 1886–1890
- Preceded by: Charles A. Kent
- Succeeded by: Jerome C. Knowlton

Personal details
- Born: Henry Wade Rogers; October 10, 1853 Holland Patent, New York, U.S.
- Died: August 16, 1926 (aged 72) Pennington, New Jersey, U.S.
- Education: University of Michigan (BA, MA)

Henry Wade Rogers (October 10, 1853 – August 16, 1926) was a United States circuit judge of the United States Court of Appeals for the Second Circuit. He also served as the 2nd Dean of Yale Law School from 1903 to 1916, and as the 6th president of Northwestern University from 1890 to 1900.

== Education and career ==
Born on October 10, 1853, in Holland Patent, New York, Rogers received a Bachelor of Arts degree in 1874 from the University of Michigan, a Master of Arts degree in 1877 from the same institution and read law in 1877. He entered practice in Minnesota in 1877 and remained in private practice in New Jersey until 1882. He was the Tappan Professor of Law at the University of Michigan from 1882 to 1886. He was Dean of the Law Department at the University of Michigan from 1886 to 1890. He was the 6th President of Northwestern University from 1890 to 1900, and interim dean of the Law School from 1892. He was a faculty member at Yale Law School from 1900 to 1916, as a lecturer from 1900 to 1901, as a Professor from 1901 to 1920 and as Dean from 1903 to 1916.

== Federal judicial service ==
Rogers was nominated by President Woodrow Wilson on September 18, 1913, to a seat on the United States Court of Appeals for the Second Circuit vacated by Judge Walter Chadwick Noyes. He was confirmed by the United States Senate on September 29, 1913, and received his commission the same day. He was a member of the Conference of Senior Circuit Judges (now the Judicial Conference of the United States) from 1922 to 1925. His service terminated on August 16, 1926, due to his death in Pennington, New Jersey.

== Family ==
Rogers married author and suffragist Emma Ferdon Winner in 1876.

== Sources ==
- Henry Wade Rogers Papers, Northwestern University Archives, Evanston, Illinois

Academic offices
Preceded by Francis Wayland III	Dean of Yale Law School; 1903–1916	Succeeded by Thomas Walter Swan
Legal offices
Preceded by Walter Chadwick Noyes	Judge of the United States Court of Appeals for the Second Circuit; 1913–1926	Succeeded by Thomas Walter Swan
