= De Heuvel, North Brabant =

Hamlet in North Brabant, Netherlands

De Heuvel is a hamlet in the Dutch province of North Brabant. It is located in the municipality of Waalre, on the north side of the town of Waalre.
