= Drusilla Wilson =

American temperance leader; Quaker preacher (1815–1908)

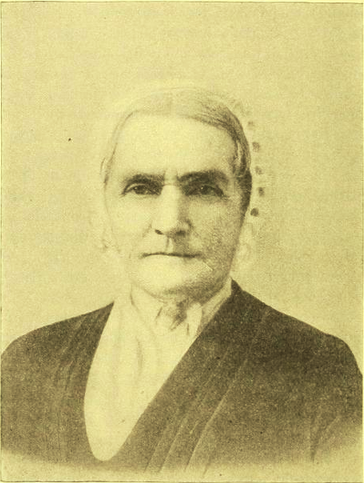
- Born: Drusilla Cox; Belmont County, Ohio
- Died: June 9, 1908 (aged 93); Carmel, Indiana
- Resting place: Crown Hill Cemetery and Arboretum, Section 4, Lot 29
- Occupations: activist and pastor
- Known for: President, Kansas Woman's Christian Temperance Union
- Spouse: Jonathan Wilson (m. 1830; died 1886)
- Children: 6

Drusilla Wilson (née Cox; May 3, 1815 – June 9, 1908) was an American temperance leader and Quaker pastor. She was the second president of the Kansas Woman's Christian Temperance Union (W.C.T.U.).

== Early life ==
Drusilla Cox was born in Belmont County, Ohio, May 3, 1815. Her parents were Joseph and Elizabeth Cox. Her father was of Scotch descent; his father came from Scotland to England and from there to North Carolina. Here both parents were born. Drusilla's siblings were: Joel (b. 1802), Rebecca (b. 1807), Elizabeth (b. 1808), Priscilla (b. 1810), Marmaduke (b. 1812), Elizabeth (b. 1813), Bennet (b. 1817), Seth (b. 1819), William (b. 1821), Maria (b. 1822), Rachel (b. 1825), Joseph (b. 1827), and Ann (b. 1829).

At the age of four, she could read in the Bible, and later as her mother sat spinning at her wheel, Drusilla would read aloud to her from it. At the age of fifteen, the family moved to Wayne County, Indiana.

== Career ==
=== Indiana ===
On October 30, 1830, in Wayne County, she married Jonathan Wilson (1809-1886). They had six children, Ann (b. 1834), Elizabeth (b. 1837), Margaret (b. 1838), Israel (b. 1840), Martha (b. 1842), and Joseph (b. 1844)..

In 1849, they moved to Hamilton County, Indiana, and settled where Poplar Ridge Meeting House later was established. At that time, there were no Friends meeting houses closer than Carmel, Indiana but the Wilsons succeeded in starting one which became quite prosperous. They were among the first to advocate the organization of Bible Schools in Friends churches. During their residence at Poplar Ridge, Wilson served as clerk at different meetings and often spoke in the worship gatherings.

Near the opening of the Civil War, the family moved to Indianapolis, where she took an active part in religious work. While quite young for that important station, she was appointed Elder. She served as Clerk of the Indiana Yearly Meeting for five or six years. In 1858, when the Western Yearly Meeting was set up, she was appointed Clerk of the Women's Meeting and served until her removal to Kansas.

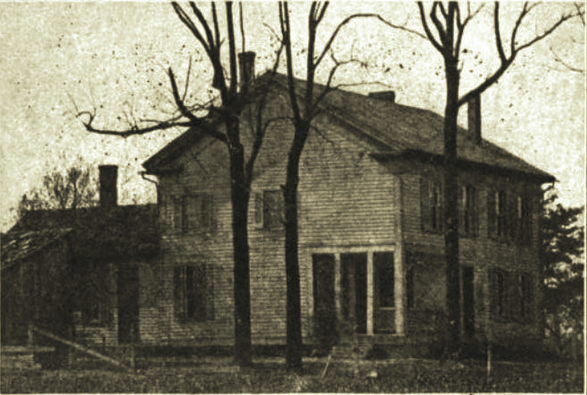
Wilson home (1860)

About the year of 1867, the Indiana Yearly Meeting put Mr. and Mrs. Wilson in charge of the White's Manual Labor Institute near Wabash, Indiana. For four years, they maintained and directed this Institution. While in this institution, she said:—

"The day I was fifty-two years of age I received a real baptism of the Holy Ghost. I gave myself, all that I have and ever would be; my time, talents, tongue, all to the Lord and immediately I was filled with the Spirit."

=== Kansas ===
In the fall of 1871, they moved to Kansas. Two years were spent on a farm and as Superintendent of a school for Native Americans. In the spring of 1873, they moved to Lawrence, Kansas, just as the Women's Crusade took form. Wilson believed she was born a Prohibitionest, inherited from her father. Soon after her arrival in Kansas, Wilson was made State Organizer of the W.C.T.U., then State Treasurer of the Organization and later State President for three years.

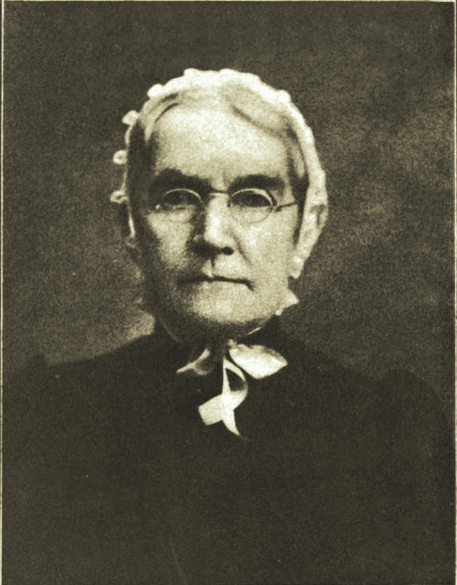
(undated)

During campaign year 1879-80, she traveled by carriage accompanied by her husband, over 3,000 miles (4,800 km), holding meetings in school houses and churches. Over 300 public meetings were held in the interest of the prohibition Amendment, besides holding Bands of Hope meetings (later, Loyal Temperance Legion) and giving talks in Sunday schools. She spent six weeks visiting Unions during the year, encouraging and strengthening them for this service. She did not receive US$1 salary. She was 64 years of age when she accomplished this.

During this time, her gift as a Christian minister was recognized by Lawrence Monthly Meeting which added to her responsibilities. Although especially called to the temperance work, her interest in church work never diminished.

=== Return to Indiana ===
After Mr. Wilson's death in 1886, the widow returned to Indiana where she lived the rest of her life. She continued her work and served as a Pastor for sometime. Upon her 86th birthday she received kind messages from the W.C.T.U. of Kansas, reminding her of the work she had furthered in the state. On her 90th birthday, she conducted a Bible reading at the home of her daughter Mrs. Bond in the presence of 60 women. The next day, she spoke in Indianapolis Friends Church. She was also a valued member and minister of Carmel Meeting.

== Death ==
Drusilla Wilson died at Carmel, Indiana, June 9, 1908.
