= De Heuvel, Gelderland =

De Heuvel
- Hamlet
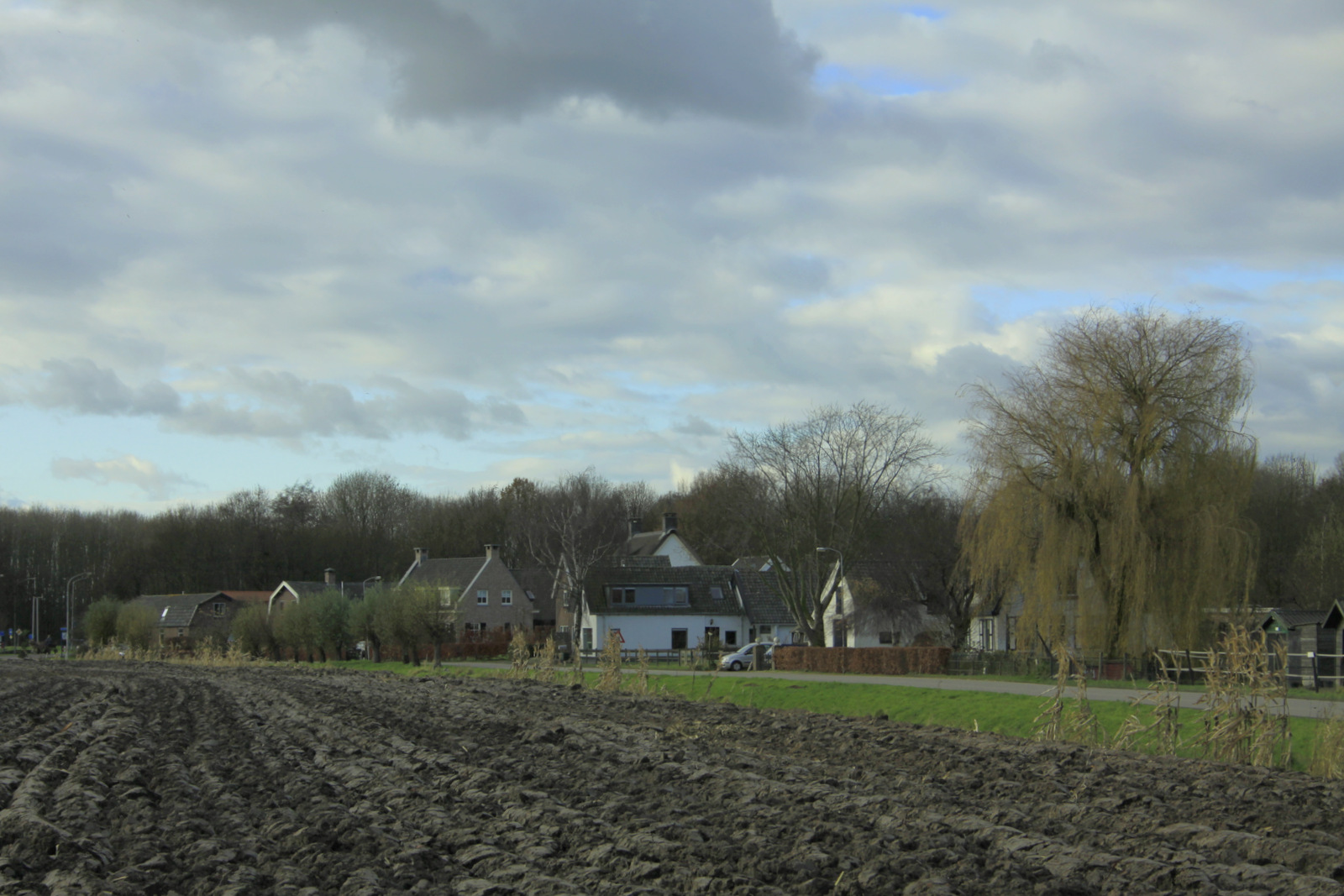
- View on De Heuvel

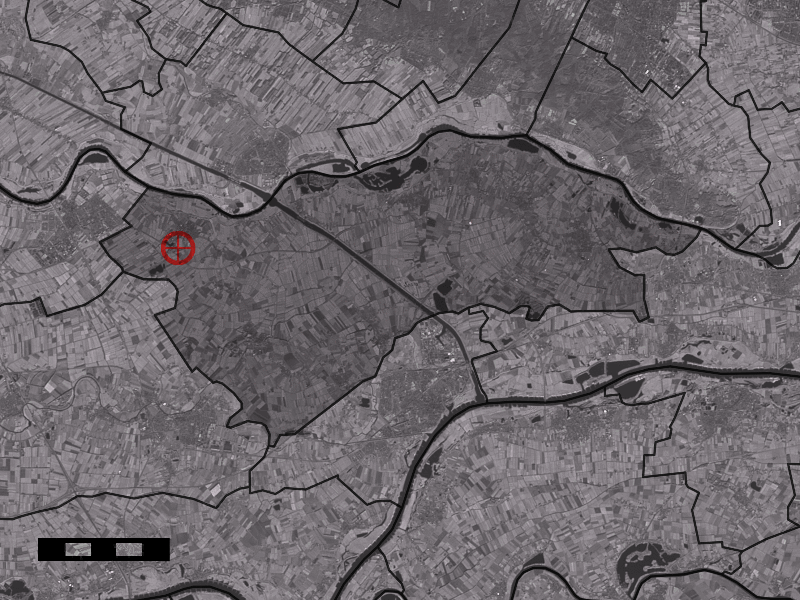
- De Heuvel in the municipality of Buren.
- Coordinates: 51.94294°N 5.28541°E
- Country: Netherlands
- Province: Gelderland
- Municipality: Buren
- Elevation: 4 m (13 ft)
- Time zone: UTC+1 (CET)
  - Summer (DST): UTC+2 (CEST)
- Postal code: 4112
- Dialing code: 0345

De Heuvel is a hamlet in the Dutch province of Gelderland. It is a part of the municipality of Buren, and lies about 11 km northwest of Tiel.

It was first mentioned in 1844 as De Heuvel, and means hill. It is not a statical entity, and the postal authorities have placed it under Beusichem. It consists of about 10 houses.
