= Frederick Vanden Heuvel =

British intelligence officer (died 1963)

Count Frederick Vanden Heuvel CMG

Chief of Rome Station for the Secret Intelligence Service

Chief of Switzerland Station for the Secret Intelligence Service
- In office 1940–1945

Personal details
- Died: 1963 (aged 78)
- Education: University College, London

Military service
- Branch/service: Secret Intelligence Service
- Battles/wars: World War I; World War II

Count Frederick "Fanny" Vanden Heuvel was a British intelligence officer and count of the Papacy during both world wars. It was either during or shortly after World War I when Vanden Heuvel was first hired by Robert Vansittart, 1st Baron Vansittart to gather intelligence for him. Around 1929, Vanden Heuvel became a member of the newly established Vansittart's Private Detective Agency, an entity established and co-operated by Vansittart and Claude Dansey to gather intelligence in Europe. In 1936, the Private Detective Agency was merged into the Z Organisation, an intelligence agency established by Dansey and Stewart Menzies to operate entirely independently of the Passport Control Office network of the Secret Intelligence Service (MI6). Vanden Heuvel was hired into the Z Organisation, where he was given the designation Z-1.

Vanden Heuvel also maintained a legitimate business venture as the director of Eno's Fruit Salts, and later the Beecham Group. His business interests allowed him to obtain information from the pharmaceutical industry and the opiumregie, and his high-ranking membership in the Catholic Church allowed him access to the vast intelligence networks that had sprung up in the orbit of the Vatican City before and during World War II.

When World War II broke out, the Z Organisation was merged into the SIS.

In 1940, Vanden Heuvel took over the Switzerland station for the Secret Intelligence Service, running stations in Zurich, Geneva, and Bern. He was here under the cover of the British Foreign Office as a consular officer stationed in Geneva, and occasionally worked undercover as the assistant press Attaché in Bern. In Bern, he became fast friends with Allen Dulles after the OSS officer was stationed in the city in 1942.

During the Cold War, Vanden Heuvel remained in the SIS until his retirement age, and worked with Wilfred Hindle, the author of Portrait of a Newspaper and Foreign Correspondent.

In 1946, Vanden Heuvel participated in the creation of the company that would eventually become Pergamon Press.
