= William Kennedy (New Jersey politician) =

American politician, died 1826

Acting Governor of New Jersey
- In office June 19, 1815 – October 26, 1815
- Preceded by: William Sanford Pennington
- Succeeded by: Mahlon Dickerson

Personal details
- Born: c. 1775 Sussex County, Province of New Jersey, British America
- Died: 1826 (aged 50–51)
- Party: Democratic-Republican Party

William Kennedy (c. 1775 – 1826) was an American Democratic-Republican Party politician from Sussex County. He served in the State Assembly 1804–06 and 1808–11 where he was Speaker for the 1810 and 1811 sessions. He was elected to the New Jersey Legislative Council, the precursor to the New Jersey Senate, from 1813 to 1815. He served as Vice-President of Council from 1814 to 1815. In that capacity he was the acting governor of New Jersey from June 19, 1815, when Governor William Sanford Pennington resigned to become a federal judge, to October 26, 1815. He was succeeded as governor by Mahlon Dickerson.

Kennedy is excluded from many official listings, in spite of the fact that he acted as governor for about four months.

== See also ==
- List of governors of New Jersey

== Notes and references ==
Political offices
Preceded by William Sanford Pennington; Governor	Acting Governor of New Jersey; 1815	Succeeded by Mahlon Dickerson; Governor
