= Nathaniel Shipman =

American judge (1828–1906)

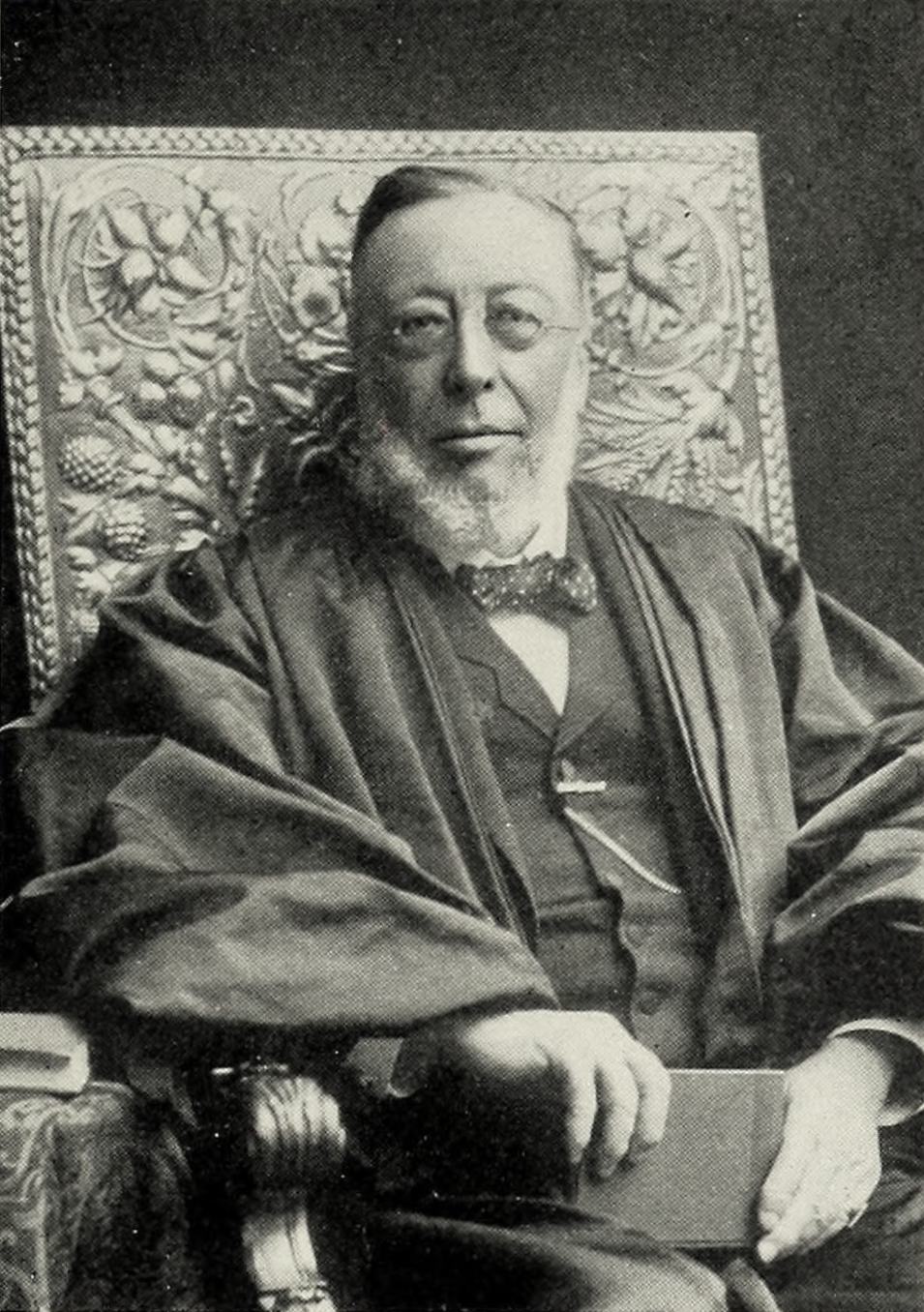

Judge of the United States Court of Appeals for the Second Circuit
- In office March 17, 1892 – March 22, 1902
- Appointed by: Benjamin Harrison
- Preceded by: Seat established by 26 Stat. 826
- Succeeded by: William Kneeland Townsend

Judge of the United States Circuit Courts for the Second Circuit
- In office March 17, 1892 – March 22, 1902
- Appointed by: Benjamin Harrison
- Preceded by: Seat established by 26 Stat. 826
- Succeeded by: William Kneeland Townsend

Judge of the United States District Court for the District of Connecticut
- In office April 16, 1873 – March 22, 1892
- Appointed by: Ulysses S. Grant
- Preceded by: William Davis Shipman
- Succeeded by: William Kneeland Townsend

Member of the Connecticut House of Representatives
- In office 1857

Personal details
- Born: August 22, 1828 Southbury, Connecticut, US
- Died: June 26, 1906 (aged 77) Hartford, Connecticut, US
- Resting place: Cedar Hill Cemetery (Hartford, Connecticut)
- Education: Yale University; Yale Law School read law

Nathaniel Shipman (August 22, 1828 – June 26, 1906) was a United States circuit judge of the United States Court of Appeals for the Second Circuit and of the United States Circuit Courts for the Second Circuit and previously was a United States district judge of the United States District Court for the District of Connecticut.

== Education and career ==
Born on August 22, 1828, in Southbury, Connecticut, Shipman graduated from Yale University in 1848 and attended Yale Law School, then read law in 1850. He entered private practice in Hartford, Connecticut from 1850 to 1873. He was a member of the Connecticut House of Representatives in 1857. He was executive secretary for Governor of Connecticut William Alfred Buckingham from 1858 to 1863.

== Federal judicial service ==
Shipman received a recess appointment from President Ulysses S. Grant on April 16, 1873, to a seat on the United States District Court for the District of Connecticut vacated by Judge William Davis Shipman. He was nominated to the same position by President Grant on December 2, 1873. He was confirmed by the United States Senate on December 8, 1873, and received his commission the same day. His service terminated on March 22, 1892, due to his elevation to the Second Circuit.

Shipman was nominated by President Benjamin Harrison on December 16, 1891, to the United States Court of Appeals for the Second Circuit and the United States Circuit Courts for the Second Circuit, to a new joint seat authorized by 26 Stat. 826. He was confirmed by the Senate on March 17, 1892, and received his commission the same day. His service terminated on March 22, 1902, due to his retirement.

=== Other service ===
Concurrent with his federal judicial service, Shipman was a lecturer for Yale Law School in 1889.

== Death ==
Shipman died on June 26, 1906, in Hartford and was interred at Cedar Hill Cemetery.

== Sources ==
Legal offices
Preceded by William Davis Shipman	Judge of the United States District Court for the District of Connecticut; 1873–1892	Succeeded by William Kneeland Townsend
Preceded by Seat established by 26 Stat. 826	Judge of the United States Circuit Courts for the Second Circuit; 1892–1902	Succeeded by William Kneeland Townsend
Preceded by Seat established by 26 Stat. 826	Judge of the United States Court of Appeals for the Second Circuit; 1892–1902	Succeeded by William Kneeland Townsend
