= Theodorus Jacobus van den Heuvel =

Dutch trader

Theodorus Jacobus van den Heuvel was a Dutch trader.

== Biography ==
=== Early career ===
Theodorus Jacobus van den Heuvel was born in Maastricht as the son of a mayor. In 1716 he signed up with the Dutch East India Company to make the trip to Asia. There he started his career working in Batavia and Malakka.

=== Opperhoofd of Siam ===
From 1735 to 1740 Van den Heuvel was the opperhoofd, ranking as the highest Company Official, in the Dutch East India Company trading post of Ayutthaya in Siam. According to H. E. Niemijer, this period marked a sharp decline in amicable relations between the Dutch East India Company and Siam. This is evidenced by the existence of a letter of complaint from a Siamese phraklang to the Company's leadership in Batavia regarding Van den Heuvels' attempts to keep prices down.

=== Participation in ceremonies ===
During his period in Siam, Van den Heuvel was invited to various ceremonies by king Borommakot. These included participation in the seventeen-day annual pilgrimage to Wat Phra Phutthabat in 1737 and an inspection of a funeral pyre of Queen Aphainuchit in 1738.

=== Later life ===
After his period in Ayutthaya, Van den Heuvel was relocated to Sumatra on behalf of the Company. He died in 1748 in the vicinity of Batavia.
