= William Davis Shipman =

American judge (1818–1898)

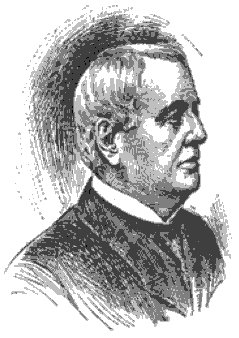

Judge of the United States District Court for the District of Connecticut
- In office March 12, 1860 – April 16, 1873
- Appointed by: James Buchanan
- Preceded by: Charles A. Ingersoll
- Succeeded by: Nathaniel Shipman

United States Attorney for the District of Connecticut
- In office 1853–1860
- President: Franklin Pierce; James Buchanan
- Preceded by: Elisha S. Abernathy
- Succeeded by: Tilton E. Doolittle

Personal details
- Born: December 29, 1818 Chester, Connecticut, U.S.
- Died: September 24, 1898 (aged 79) Astoria, Queens, New York, U.S.
- Education: Read law

William Davis Shipman (December 29, 1818 – September 24, 1898) was a United States district judge of the United States District Court for the District of Connecticut. He notably presided over the 1861 trial of Nathaniel Gordon, the only person to be convicted and executed in the United States for illegal slave smuggling.

== Education and career ==
Born in Chester, Connecticut, Shipman read law to enter the bar in 1849 and entered private practice in East Haddam, Connecticut. He was a probate judge in Hartford, Connecticut from 1852 to 1853, a member of the Connecticut House of Representatives in 1853, and the United States Attorney for the District of Connecticut from 1853 to 1860.

== Federal judicial service ==
Shipman was nominated by President James Buchanan on February 28, 1860, to a seat on the United States District Court for the District of Connecticut vacated by Judge Charles A. Ingersoll. He was confirmed by the United States Senate on March 12, 1860, and received his commission the same day. His service was terminated on April 16, 1873, due to his resignation.

=== United States v. Nathaniel Gordon ===
Among the notable cases over which Shipman presided, was the case of the United States v. Nathaniel Gordon. The case resulted in Gordon's execution, which is the only such execution ever under the Piracy Law of 1820. In sentencing Gordon, Shipman said:

Let me implore you to seek the spiritual guidance of the ministers of religion; and let your repentance be as humble and thorough as your crime was great. Do not attempt to hide its enormity from yourself; think of the cruelty and wickedness of seizing nearly a thousand fellow beings, who never did you harm, and thrusting them beneath the decks of a small ship, beneath a burning tropical sun, to die in of disease or suffocation, or be transported to distant lands, and be consigned, they and their posterity, to a fate far more cruel than death.

Think of the sufferings of the unhappy beings whom you crowded on the Erie; of their helpless agony and terror as you took them from their native land; and especially of their miseries on the ---- ----- place of your capture to Monrovia! Remember that you showed mercy to none, carrying off as you did not only those of your own sex, but women and helpless children.

Do not flatter yourself that because they belonged to a different race from yourself, your guilt is therefore lessened – rather fear that it is increased. In the just and generous heart, the humble and the weak inspire compassion, and call for pity and forbearance. As you are soon to pass into the presence of that God of the black man as well as the white man, who is no respecter of persons, do not indulge for a moment the thought that he hears with indifference the cry of the humblest of his children. Do not imagine that because others shared in the guilt of this enterprise, yours, is thereby diminished; but remember the awful admonition of your Bible, "Though hand joined in hand, the wicked shall not go unpunished."

— Worcester Aegis and Transcript; December 7, 1861; pg. 1, col. 6.

== Later career and death ==
Following his resignation from the federal bench, Shipman resumed private practice in New York City until his death on September 24, 1898, in the Astoria neighborhood in Queens, New York City.

== Sources ==
Legal offices
Preceded by Charles A. Ingersoll	Judge of the United States District Court for the District of Connecticut; 1860–1873	Succeeded by Nathaniel Shipman
