= Marcus Höfl =

German sports manager

Marcus Höfl is a German sports manager and investor operating internationally. Having founded Marcus Höfl Management – MHM Majors, as sports management agency, he has represented the former football player and executive Franz Beckenbauer from 2003 to 2024.

Since then Höfl is representing international sport brands, clubs and personalities.

== Life and career ==
Höfl is the son of former German speed skater and trainer Herbert Höfl. After his education as a communications manager at the Bayerische Akademie für Werbung und Marketing (Bavarian academy for advertisement and marketing), Höfl set up Marcus Höfl Management – MHM Majors, a sports management and marketing company, in 1997 in Kitzbühel and began managing the former football player and executive Franz Beckenbauer in 2003 until 2024. In 2011, he married Olympic and world champion Maria Höfl-Riesch. In 2024 the couple announced their private separation, however continue their professional collaboration.

From 2006 to 2009 Höfl was also responsible for the global development of Red Bull's football activities. He also was member of the supervisory board of DFL Sports Enterprises, the marketing subsidiary of the German football league DFL and member of the Board of Governors of Major League Soccer (MLS). From 2016 to 2021, Höfl was a shareholder and member of the supervisory board of German football club FC Augsburg.

Starting from 2021, Höfl advises German basketball player and NBA player Dennis Schröder on international marketing, communications and commercial partnerships.

Through his agency MHM Majors, Höfl represents the Orlando Magic in Europe and serves as the NBA franchise's European commercial representative.

In 2026, Höfl and MHM Majors began representing the Seattle Seahawks in Germany, Austria and Switzerland.

The agency advises the American franchises on their European brand development strategy, fan and community programs, and commercial partnerships.

Höfl is also a co-founder of Cerro Capital investment fund focused on companies in the international sports-tech sector like X Games and Religion of Sports.

Moreover, as a shareholder of LEAD and ADvantage, he is invested in diverse companies like TMRW Sports, Greenfly and the Portuguese football team Estrela da Amadora.

Furthermore, Höfl and his company organized winter sports events such as the Mountain Peak and Winter Sports Summit in Kitzbühel and developed, together with Ghorfa (Arab-German Chamber of Commerce) the Arab-German Sports Summit. Moreover he is a board member of the Arab-German Chamber of Commerce and Industry. In 2013, he founded Camp Beckenbauer, a global sports platform and sports summit in Kitzbühel.

Personalities he has advised are Boris Becker, Franziska van Almsick, Sébastien Ogier, Andrea Kaiser, Simon Schempp, Stefan Reuter, and Matthias Sammer.
