= William Sanford Pennington =

American attorney, judge and politician (1757–1826)

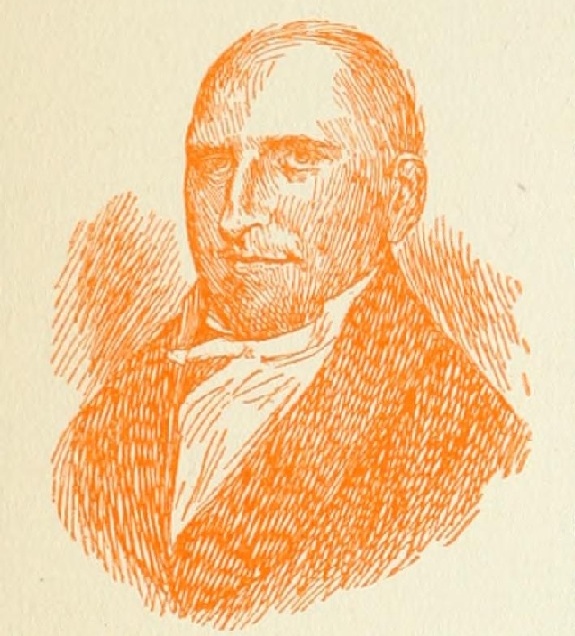

Judge of the United States District Court for the District of New Jersey
- In office June 19, 1815 – September 17, 1826
- Appointed by: James Madison
- Preceded by: Robert Morris
- Succeeded by: William Rossell

6th Governor of New Jersey
- In office October 29, 1813 – June 19, 1815
- Preceded by: Aaron Ogden
- Succeeded by: William Kennedy (acting)

United States Attorney for the District of New Jersey
- In office 1803–1804
- President: Thomas Jefferson
- Preceded by: George C. Maxwell
- Succeeded by: Joseph McIlvaine

New Jersey State Council
- In office 1801–1802

Personal details
- Born: William Sanford Pennington; 1757 Newark, Province of New Jersey, British America
- Died: September 17, 1826 (aged 68–69) Newark, New Jersey
- Party: Democratic-Republican
- Spouses: Phoebe Wheeler (m. 1786; died 1804) Elizabeth Pierson (m. 1805)
- Children: 10, including William
- Education: read law

William Sanford Pennington (1757 – September 17, 1826) was a United States Attorney for the District of New Jersey, an associate justice of the Supreme Court of New Jersey, the sixth governor of New Jersey and a United States district judge of the United States District Court for the District of New Jersey.

== Early life and military service ==
Born in 1757, in Newark, Province of New Jersey, British America, His parents were Samuel Pennington (c. 1726-1791) and Mary Sandford (c. 1726-1805). He was the namesake of his grandfather William Sandford (III) and great-great-grandson of William Sandford. Pennington likely was trained as a hatter and likely engaged in that profession during his early years. He joined the Continental Army during the American Revolutionary War. In 1777, he was promoted to sergeant in the Second Regiment of Artillery. He was promoted to second lieutenant in 1780. At the end of the war he was brevetted a captain by an Act of Congress. Pennington served in the New Jersey General Assembly in 1797, 1798, and 1799, was elected to the New Jersey State Council (now the New Jersey Legislative Council) in 1801, and 1802.

== Education and career ==
Pennington read law in 1802, with Elias Boudinot. He entered private practice in Newark, New Jersey from 1802 to 1816. He was county clerk for Essex County, New Jersey in 1803. He was the United States Attorney for the District of New Jersey from 1803 to 1804. He was an associate justice of the Supreme Court of New Jersey from 1804 to 1813. He was reporter for the Supreme Court of New Jersey from 1806 to 1813. He was the 6th Governor of New Jersey from 1813 to 1815, elected as a Democratic-Republican in consecutive victories over his Federalist predecessor, Aaron Ogden.

== Federal judicial service ==
Pennington received a recess appointment from President James Madison on June 19, 1815, to a seat on the United States District Court for the District of New Jersey vacated by Judge Robert Morris. He was nominated to the same position by President Madison on January 8, 1816. He was confirmed by the United States Senate on January 9, 1816, and received his commission on January 16, 1816.

While serving as a District Court Judge, Pennington published a treatise on small cause courts. His service terminated on September 17, 1826, due to his death in Newark.

== Family ==
Pennington was the son of Mary Sanford and Samuel Penningston. He married Phoebe Wheeler around 1786. They had ten children including William Pennington (1796–1862) who became Governor of New Jersey and Speaker of the United States House of Representatives. After the death of his wife in 1804, he married Elizabeth Pierson (c. 1765–1840) on July 13, 1805.

== Membership ==
Pennington joined other New Jersey officers in becoming a founding member of the Society of the Cincinnati in the State of New Jersey.

== Legacy ==
Pennington's papers are archived with the New Jersey Historical Society in Newark. Pennington, New Jersey is named for Pennington.

== See also ==
- List of governors of New Jersey

== Sources ==
Political offices
| Preceded by Aaron Ogden | Governor of New Jersey; 1813–1815 | Succeeded by William Kennedy (acting) |
Legal offices
| Preceded by Robert Morris | Judge of the United States District Court for the District of New Jersey; 1815–1826 | Succeeded by William Rossell |
