= Jared Ingersoll Sr. =

American lawyer (1722–1781)

Jared Ingersoll
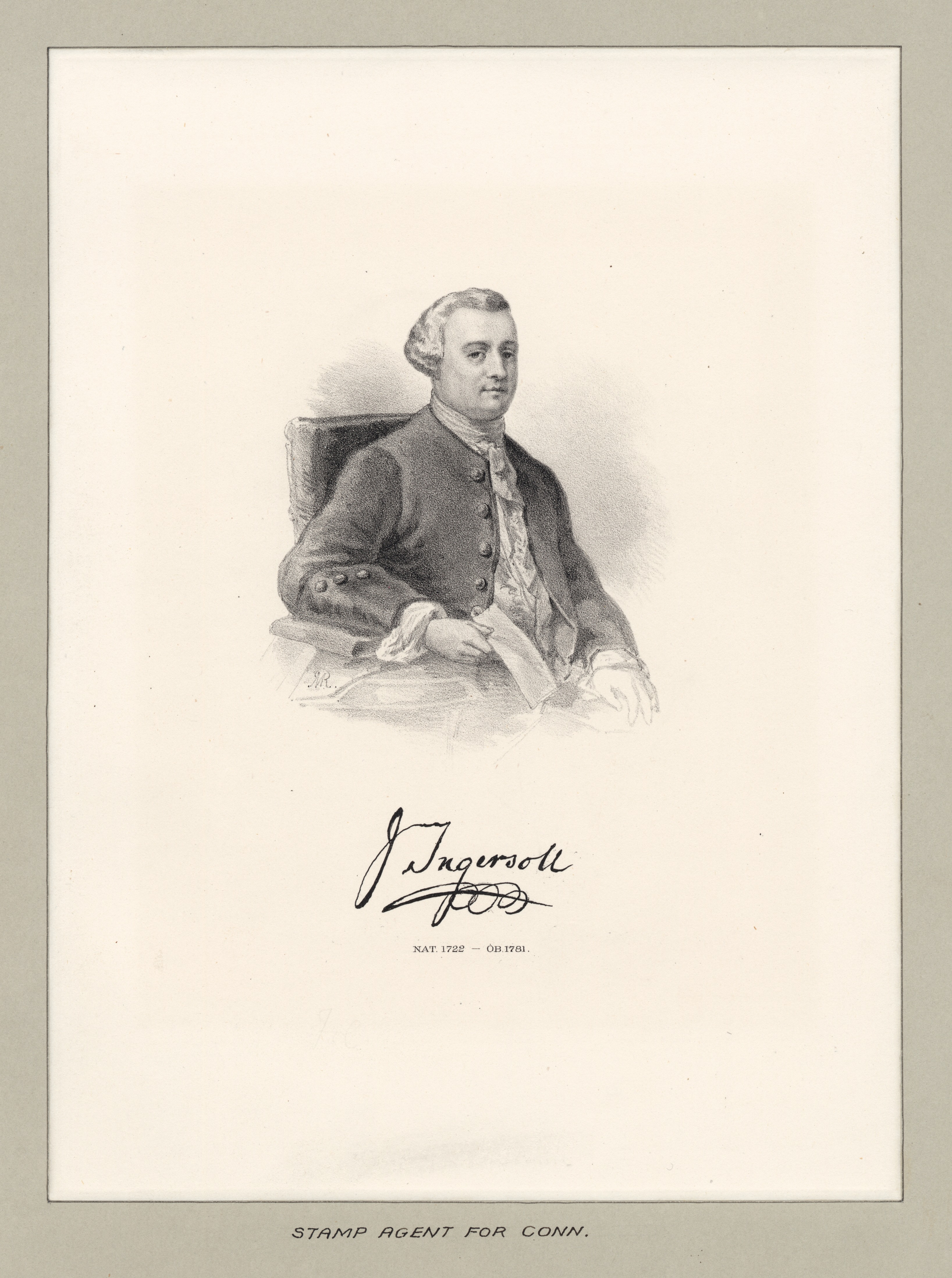
- Ingersoll by Max Rosenthal
- Born: 1722; Milford, Connecticut, Great Britain
- Died: August 1781 (aged 58–59); New Haven, Connecticut, United States
- Education: Yale University
- Children: Jared and 3 others

Jared Ingersoll (1722 – August 1781) gained notoriety in Connecticut as agent for the Stamp Act of 1765.

== Biography ==
Jared Ingersoll Sr. was descended from John Ingersoll Sr. (1626–1684), who was born in Edworth, Bedfordshire, England and settled in Massachusetts. He graduated from Yale in 1742. After his graduation, he stayed at Yale for a year as a Berkeley scholar, and then settled in New Haven and opened a legal practice, reaching a prominent position in the bar of New Haven County within a dozen years. By 1757, he held the office of King's Attorney, and in May 1758, the colonial legislature appointed him agent for Connecticut Colony at the English court, mainly to negotiate reimbursement for recent expenditures in the French and Indian War. He was resident in London working on this task from January 1759 until May 1760, when he resigned and returned to Connecticut. In October 1764, he returned to England to deliver a load of masts from the Connecticut River, and to advise his successor as agent.

In 1765, he arrived in Boston from England charged with the commission of stamp agent for Connecticut, a position Benjamin Franklin had advised him to accept. After the demonstrations against the obnoxious act in various parts of the colonies, Ingersoll, assured of the governor's protection, tried to reason the people of New Haven into forbearance. Surrounding his house, they demanded him to resign. "I know not if I have the power to resign," he replied. He promised, however, that he would return any stamps that he received or leave the matter to their decision. He was finally compelled to offer his resignation. His actions not satisfying the people of other sections of Connecticut, he resolved to place himself under the protection of the legislature in Hartford, in order to save his house from an attack.

On his way to Hartford, he met a body of 500 men on horseback several miles below Wethersfield. They were preceded by three trumpeters and two militia officers. They received him and rode with him to Wethersfield, where they compelled him to resign his office. Entering a house for safety, he sent word of his situation to the governor and the assembly. After waiting for three hours the people entered the house. Ingersoll said, "The cause is not worth dying for," and made a written declaration that his resignation was his own free act, without any equivocation. "Swear to it," said the crowd, but this he refused to do. They then commanded him to shout "Liberty and property" three times, and, throwing his hat into the air, he obeyed. He was then escorted by a large crowd to Hartford, where he read to the assembly the paper that he had just signed.

In April 1771, he and his family moved to Philadelphia where he took up his duties as Judge of the Court of Vice-Admiralty for the middle colonies. He received this commission in compensation for his ill treatment as stamp agent. With the onset of the Revolution, he incurred the displeasure of the Provincial Council of Pennsylvania, and in November 1777 was obliged to return to New Haven, where he died in 1781. He lies buried in the Center Church Crypt, under a memorial tablet lavishly praising his "uncommon Genius" and "graceful and majestic Dignity," among other virtues.

He was the subject of an influential political biography by a major American historian of the Imperial School, Lawrence Henry Gipson: Jared Ingersoll: A Study of American Loyalism in Relation to British Colonial Government, first published in 1920.

== Family ==
In 1743, he married Hannah Whiting in Branford, Connecticut. She died in 1779. They had four children, of whom one survived infancy. In 1780, he married Hannah Miles, who survived him. His surviving child, also named Jared Ingersoll, took the side of the revolutionaries in the American Revolution. His brother Jonathan also graduated from Yale (Class of 1736).

== Bibliography ==
- Mr. Ingersoll's letters relating to the Stamp-Act
- The history and practice of the High Court of Chancery : in which is introduced, an account of the institution and various regulations of the said Court, shewing likewise the ancient and present practice thereof in an easy and familiar method
- Liberty and property vindicated, and the st--pm-n burnt. A discourse occasionally made on burning the effige of the st--pm-n
- An historical account of some affairs relating to the church, especially in Connecticut, together with a notation of some other things of a different nature
