= Edward Ingersoll =

Edward Ingersoll (2 April 1817, Philadelphia - 19 February 1893 Germantown, Philadelphia, Pennsylvania) was a United States author.

== Biography ==
He was the son of Mary Wilcocks and politician and writer Charles Jared Ingersoll. He graduated from the University of Pennsylvania in 1835, and was admitted to the bar in 1838, but he never established a legal practice. During the American Civil War, his sympathies were with the South.

== Works ==
- History and Law of Habeas Corpus and Grand Juries (Philadelphia, 1849)
- Personal Liberty and Martial Law (1862)

He edited:

- Hale, Pleas of the Crown
- Addison on Contracts
- Saunders on Uses and Trusts
