= Jared Ingersoll =

American Founding Father and politician

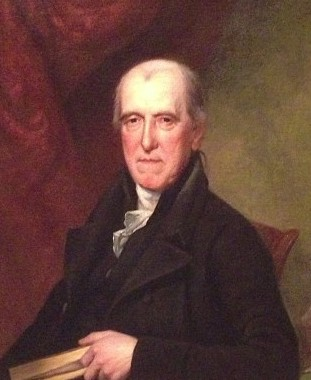
- Portrait, c. 1820

United States Attorney for the Eastern District of Pennsylvania
- In office 1815–1822
- President: James Madison; James Monroe
- Preceded by: Alexander Dallas
- Succeeded by: George M. Dallas

Attorney General of Pennsylvania
- In office December 13, 1811 – December 21, 1816
- Governor: Simon Snyder
- Preceded by: Richard Rush
- Succeeded by: Amos Ellmaker
- In office August 20, 1791 – May 10, 1800
- Governor: Thomas Mifflin; Thomas McKean
- Preceded by: William Bradford
- Succeeded by: Joseph McKean

Personal details
- Born: October 24, 1749 New Haven, Connecticut, British America
- Died: October 31, 1822 (aged 73) Philadelphia, Pennsylvania, U.S.
- Party: Federalist
- Parent: Jared Ingersoll
- Education: Yale University (BA)

Jared Ingersoll Jr. (October 24, 1749 – October 31, 1822) was an American Founding Father, lawyer, and statesman from Philadelphia, Pennsylvania. He was a delegate to the Continental Congress and a signer of the United States Constitution. He served as DeWitt Clinton's running mate in the 1812 election, but Clinton and Ingersoll were defeated by James Madison and Elbridge Gerry.

Born in New Haven, Connecticut, Ingersoll established a legal career in Philadelphia after graduating from Yale College. The son of British colonial official Jared Ingersoll Sr., Ingersoll lived in Europe from 1773 to 1776 to avoid the growing political conflict between Britain and the Thirteen Colonies. In 1778, having committed himself to the cause of American independence, Ingersoll returned to Philadelphia and won election to the Continental Congress. Ingersoll became convinced of the need for a stronger national government than what was provided by the Articles of Confederation, and he was a delegate to the 1787 Philadelphia Convention. Though he was initially seeking amendments for the Articles of Confederation, he eventually came to support the new Constitution that was produced by the convention.

He served as the Pennsylvania Attorney General from 1791 to 1800 and from 1811 to 1816. He also served as the United States Attorney for Pennsylvania and as the city solicitor for Philadelphia. He argued the cases of Chisholm v. Georgia and Hylton v. United States, two of the first cases to appear before the United States Supreme Court.

Ingersoll affiliated with the Federalist Party and was deeply disturbed by Thomas Jefferson's victory in the 1800 presidential election. In 1812, the Democratic-Republican Party split between President Madison and Clinton. The Federalists decided to support a ticket of Clinton and Ingersoll in hopes of defeating the incumbent president. Madison prevailed in the election, winning Ingersoll's crucial home state of Pennsylvania.

== Life and career ==
Jared Ingersoll was a supporter of the Revolutionary cause. His training as a lawyer convinced him that the problems of the newly independent states were caused by the inadequacy of the Articles of Confederation. He became an early and ardent proponent of constitutional reform, although, like a number of his colleagues at the Constitutional Convention, he believed this reform could be achieved by a simple revision of the Articles. Only after weeks of debate did he come to see that a new document was necessary. His major contribution to the cause of constitutional government came not during the convention but later during a lengthy and distinguished legal career when he helped define many of the principles enunciated at Philadelphia.

=== Early life ===
Born in New Haven, Connecticut, Ingersoll was the son of Jared Ingersoll Sr., a prominent British official whose strong Loyalist sentiments would lead to his being tarred and feathered by radical Patriots. The Ingersoll family was of English descent. In 1765, the year the Stamp Act was imposed on the colonies in America, the British Crown appointed the elder Jared Ingersoll as Stamp Master, the colonial agent in London, for the colony of Connecticut. As the next few months passed and animosity over the Stamp Act grew, Ingersoll became the most hated man in the colony. Between August 21 and 29, 1765, the Sons of Liberty hung his effigy in various parts of the colony. He wrote an account of Isaac Barre's speech made during the Parliamentary debate on the Stamp Act to Connecticut Governor Thomas Fitch. He would later be involved in a controversial role as the agent who enforced the resulting Stamp Act in Connecticut.

The younger Ingersoll completed Hopkins Grammar School in New Haven in 1762, graduated from Yale College in 1766, studied law in Philadelphia, and was admitted to the Pennsylvania bar in 1773. Although by training and inclination a Patriot sympathizer, the young Ingersoll shied away from the cause at the outset because of a strong sense of personal loyalty to his distinguished father. On his father's advice, he sought to escape the growing political controversy at home by retiring to London to continue his study of the law at the Middle Temple School (1773–1776) and to tour extensively through Europe. He spent more than eighteen months in Paris, where he formed an acquaintance with Benjamin Franklin.

=== American Revolution ===
Shortly after the colonies declared their independence, Ingersoll renounced his family's views, made his personal commitment to the cause of independence, and returned home. In 1778 he arrived in Philadelphia as a confirmed Patriot. With the help of influential friends he quickly established a flourishing law practice, and shortly after he entered the fray as a delegate to the Continental Congress (1780–81). In 1781 Ingersoll married Elizabeth Pettit and in that same year was elected a member of the American Philosophical Society. Always a supporter of strong central authority in political affairs, he became a leading agitator for reforming the national government in the postwar years, preaching the need for change to his friends in Congress and to the legal community.

At the convention, Ingersoll was counted among those who favored revision of the existing Articles of Confederation, but in the end he joined with the majority and supported a plan for a new federal government. Despite his national reputation as an attorney, Ingersoll seldom participated in the Convention debates, although he attended all sessions.

=== Career after the Constitutional Convention ===
Once the new national government was created, Ingersoll returned to the law. Except for a few excursions into politics—he was a member of Philadelphia's Common Council (1789), and, as a stalwart Federalist who considered the election of Thomas Jefferson in 1800 a "great subversion," he ran unsuccessfully for vice president on the Federalist ticket in 1812—his public career centered on legal affairs. He served as attorney general of Pennsylvania (1790–1799 and 1811–1817), as Philadelphia's city solicitor (1798–1801), and as U.S. district attorney for Pennsylvania (1800–01). For a brief period (1821–22), he sat as presiding judge of the Philadelphia district court.

Ingersoll's major contribution to the cause of constitutional government came not during the convention but later during a lengthy and distinguished legal career, when he helped define many of the principles enunciated at Philadelphia. He made his contributions to the Constitutional process through several Supreme Court cases that defined various basic points in Constitutional law during the beginning of the new republic. In one definitive case he represented Georgia in Chisholm v. Georgia (1793), a landmark case in states' rights. Here the court decided against him, ruling that a state may be sued in federal court by a citizen of another state. This reversal of the notion of state sovereignty was later rescinded by the Eleventh Amendment to the Constitution. In representing Hylton in Hylton v. US (1796), Ingersoll was also involved in the first legal challenge to the constitutionality of an act of Congress. In this case, the Supreme Court upheld the government's right to impose a tax on carriages. Ingersoll also served as counsel in various cases that helped clarify constitutional issues concerning the jurisdiction of federal courts and U.S. relations with other sovereign nations, including defending Senator William Blount of Tennessee against impeachment.

== Death and legacy ==
Jared Ingersoll died in Philadelphia at age 73; interment was in the Old Pine Street Church Cemetery, Fourth and Pine Streets. Ingersoll was survived by three sons. Two of the sons, Charles Jared Ingersoll and Joseph Reed Ingersoll served as members of the U.S. House of Representatives from Pennsylvania. Ingersoll Street in Madison, Wisconsin, and Liberty ship SS Jared Ingersoll are named after him.

Legal offices
Preceded by William Bradford	Attorney General of Pennsylvania; 1791–1800	Succeeded by Joseph McKean
Preceded by Richard Rush	Attorney General of Pennsylvania; 1811–1816	Succeeded by Amos Ellmaker
Party political offices
Preceded by Charles Pinckney	Federalist nominee for Vice President of the United States; 1812	Succeeded by John Howard
