= 1812 United States presidential election in New York =

- November 9, 1812
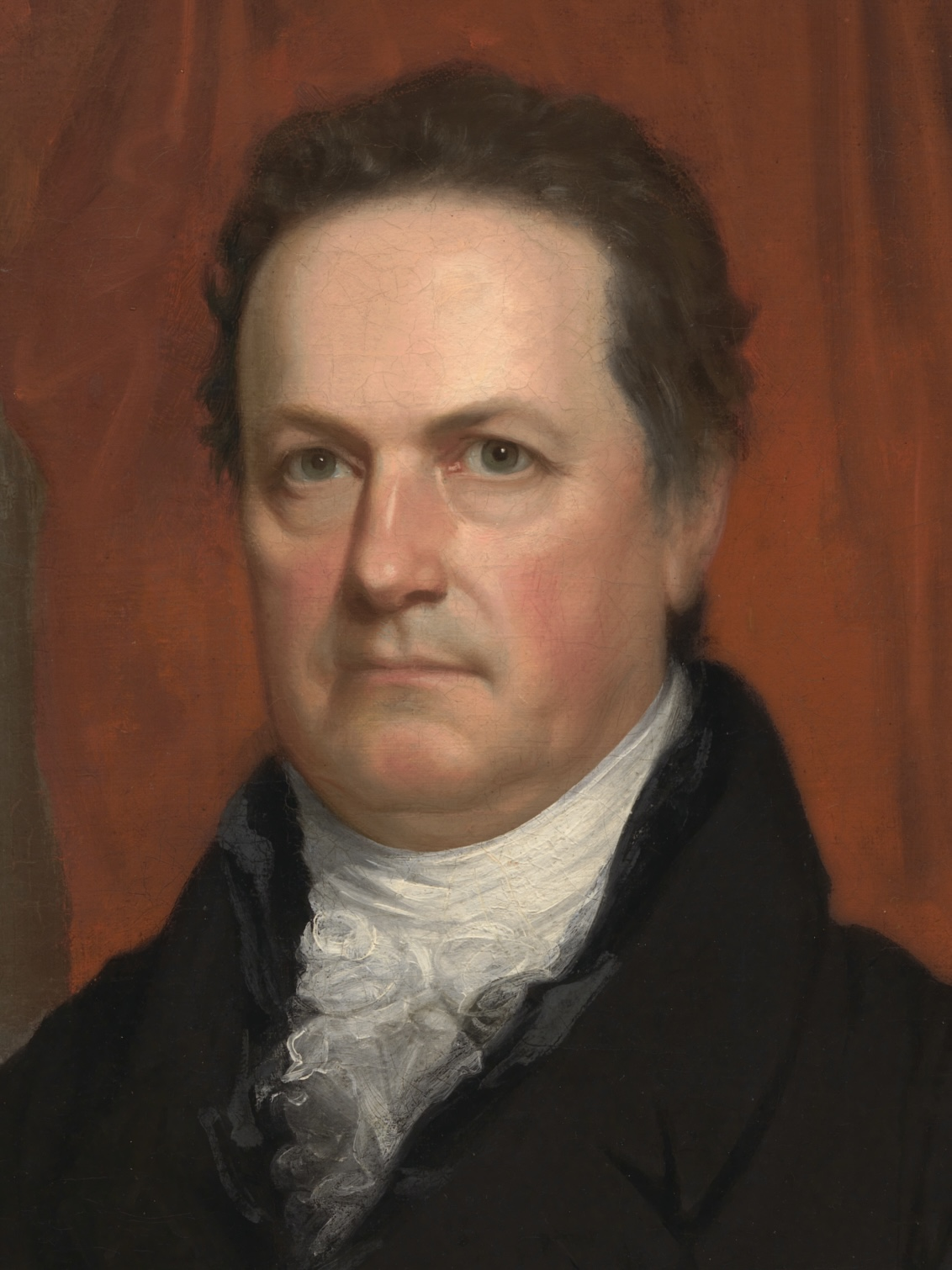
| Nominee | DeWitt Clinton |
| Party | Democratic-Republican (Note: While commonly labeled as the Federalist candidate, Clinton technically ran as a Democratic-Republican and was not nominated by the Federalist party itself, the latter simply deciding not to field a candidate. This did not prevent endorsements from state Federalist parties (such as in Pennsylvania), but he received the endorsement from the New York state Democratic-Republicans as well.) |
| Alliance | Federalist |
| Home state | New York |
| Running mate | Jared Ingersoll |
| Electoral vote | 29 |
| Percentage | 100% |
President before election
James Madison
Democratic-Republican
Elected President
James Madison
Democratic-Republican

The 1812 United States presidential election in New York took place on November 9, 1812, as part of the 1812 United States presidential election. The state legislature chose 29 representatives, or electors to the Electoral College, who voted for President and Vice President. During this election, New York cast its 29 electoral votes to Independent Democratic Republican and Federalist supported candidate DeWitt Clinton, who was then currently serving as the Mayor of New York City and the Lieutenant Governor of New York.

The election ultimately hinged on both New York and neighboring Pennsylvania, and while Clinton was able to take his home state, he failed to take Pennsylvania and thus lost the election to traditional Democratic Republican candidate and incumbent President James Madison won by a narrow margin. This would be the first time New York would vote for a losing presidential candidate. It would also be the only time that happened until 1856.

1812 was the first US presidential election where New York State was the most populous state in the nation, after overtaking Virginia in population total. New York would remain the most populous state in the nation until 1962, when overtaken by California, with California having more people cast votes than in New York State for the first time in 1968.

== See also ==
- United States presidential elections in New York
