= David Mead =

David Mead may refer to:

- David Mead (military general) (1752–1816), founder of Meadville, Pennsylvania
- David Mead (musician) (born 1973), American pop singer and songwriter
- David Mead (rugby league) (born 1988), Papua New Guinean rugby league footballer
