= 1812 United States presidential election =

Re-election of James Madison

- October 30 – December 2, 1812

217 members of the Electoral College 109 electoral votes needed to win
- Turnout: 40.4% (▲3.6 pp)
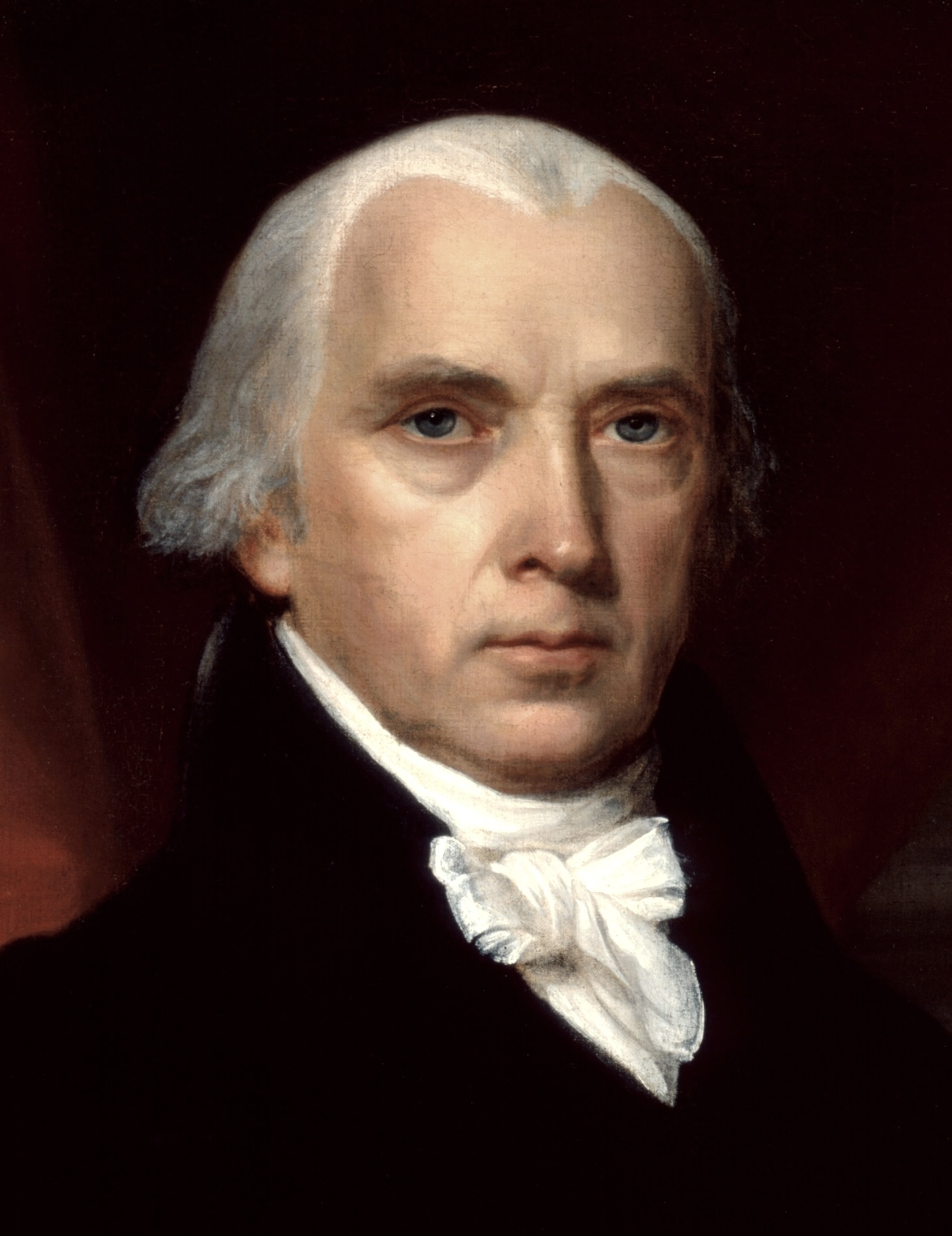

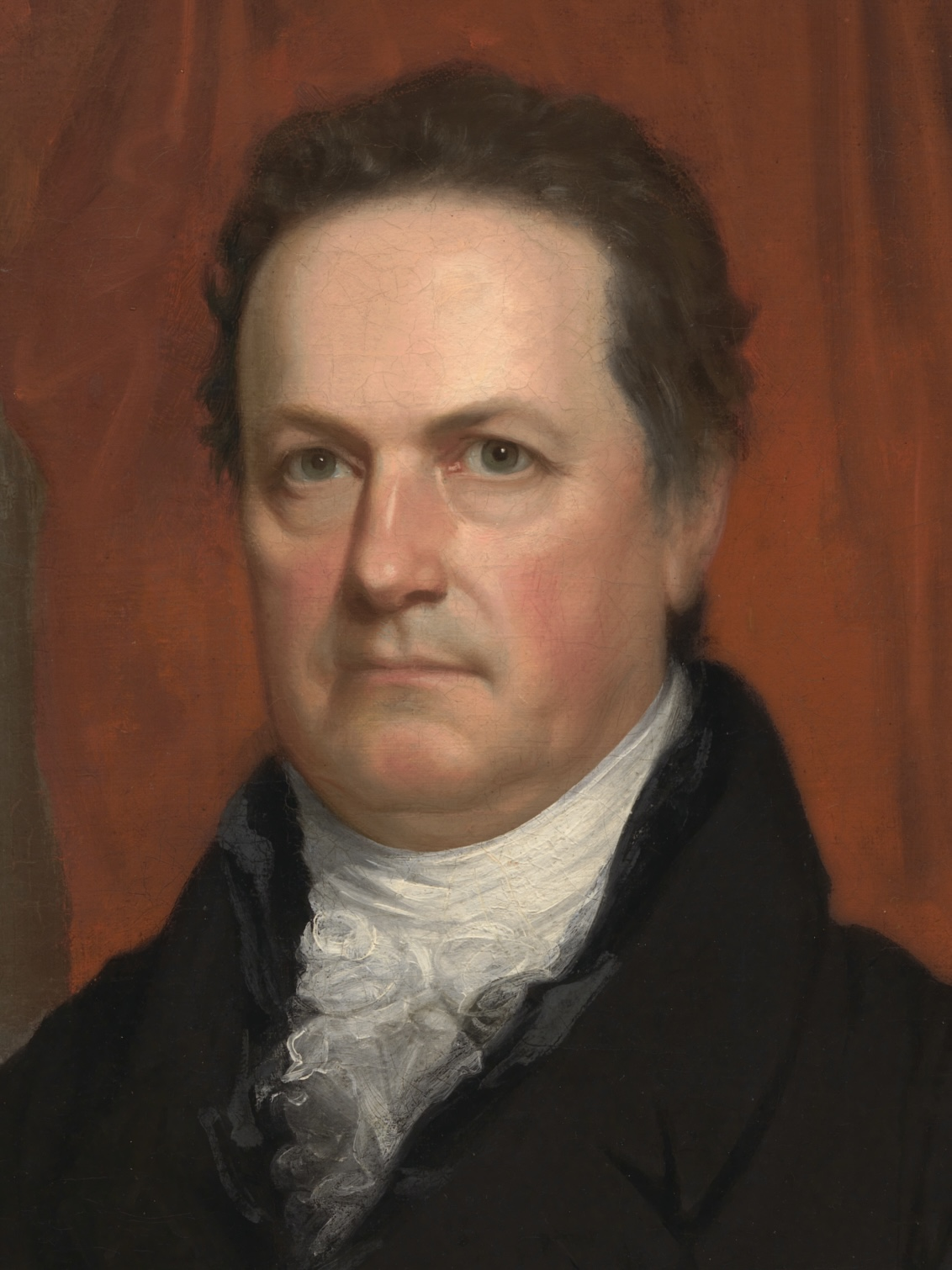
Nominee	James Madison	DeWitt Clinton
Party	Democratic-Republican	Democratic-Republican
Alliance		Federalist
Home state	Virginia	New York
Running mate	Elbridge Gerry (Note: John Langdon had originally been nominated as Madison's running mate; however, Langdon declined the nomination and Gerry was chosen instead.)	Jared Ingersoll
Electoral vote	128	89
States carried	11	7
Popular vote	140,431	132,781
Percentage	50.3%	47.6%
- Presidential election results map. Green denotes states won by Madison/Gerry and Azure denotes states won by Clinton/Ingersoll. Numbers indicate the number of electoral votes cast by each state.
President before election
James Madison
Democratic-Republican
Elected President
James Madison
Democratic-Republican

A presidential election was held in the United States from October 30 to December 2, 1812. In the shadow of the War of 1812, incumbent Democratic-Republican President James Madison narrowly defeated DeWitt Clinton, the lieutenant governor of New York and mayor of New York City, who drew support from dissident Northern Democratic-Republicans as well as Federalists. It was the first presidential election to be held during a major war involving the United States. As no significant British incursions into American territory had occurred by that time, and Britain's war strategy was largely defensive, the election proceeded without disruption.

Northern Democratic-Republicans had long been dissatisfied by the Southern dominance of their party, and DeWitt Clinton's uncle, Vice President George Clinton, had unsuccessfully challenged Madison for the party's 1808 presidential nomination. While the May 1812 Democratic-Republican congressional nominating caucus re-nominated Madison, the party's New York caucus, also held in May, nominated Clinton for president. After the United States declared war on the United Kingdom in June 1812, Clinton sought to create a coalition of anti-war Democratic-Republicans and Federalists. With Clinton in the race, the Federalist Party declined to formally put forth a nominee, hoping its members would vote for Clinton, but they did not formally endorse him, fearing that an explicit endorsement of Clinton would hurt the party's fortunes in other races. Federalist Jared Ingersoll of Pennsylvania became Clinton's de facto running mate. A dissident faction of the Federalist Party attempted to nominate former vice presidential candidate Rufus King over Clinton, but only succeeded in doing so in Virginia.

Despite Clinton's success at attracting Federalist support, Madison was re-elected with 50.4 percent of the popular vote to his opponent's 47.6%, making the 1812 election the closest election up to that point in the popular vote (there was no popular vote in half the states). Clinton won the Federalist bastion of New England as well as three Mid-Atlantic states, but Madison dominated the South and took Pennsylvania. This was the narrowest popular vote margin for a victorious re-elected president until 2004.

== Background ==
Residual military conflict resulting from the Napoleonic Wars in Europe had been steadily worsening throughout James Madison's first term, with the British Empire and the French Empire both ignoring the neutrality rights of the United States at sea by seizing American ships and looking for supposed British deserters in a practice known as impressment. The British provided additional provocations by impressing American seamen, maintaining forts within United States territory in the Northwest, and supporting Native Americans at war with the United States in both the Northwest and Southwest.

Meanwhile, expansionists in the south and west of the United States coveted British Canada and Spanish Florida and wanted to use British provocations as a pretext to seize both areas. The pressure steadily built, with the result that the United States declared war on the United Kingdom on June 12, 1812. This occurred after Madison had been nominated by the Democratic-Republicans, but before the Federalists had made their nomination. He won the nomination with 128 votes.

== Nominations ==
=== Democratic-Republican Party nomination ===
Democratic-Republican Party 1812 Democratic-Republican Party Ticket
James Madison	Elbridge Gerry
for President	for Vice President
4th President of the United States (1809–1817)	9th Governor of Massachusetts (1810–1812)

Democratic-Republican candidates:

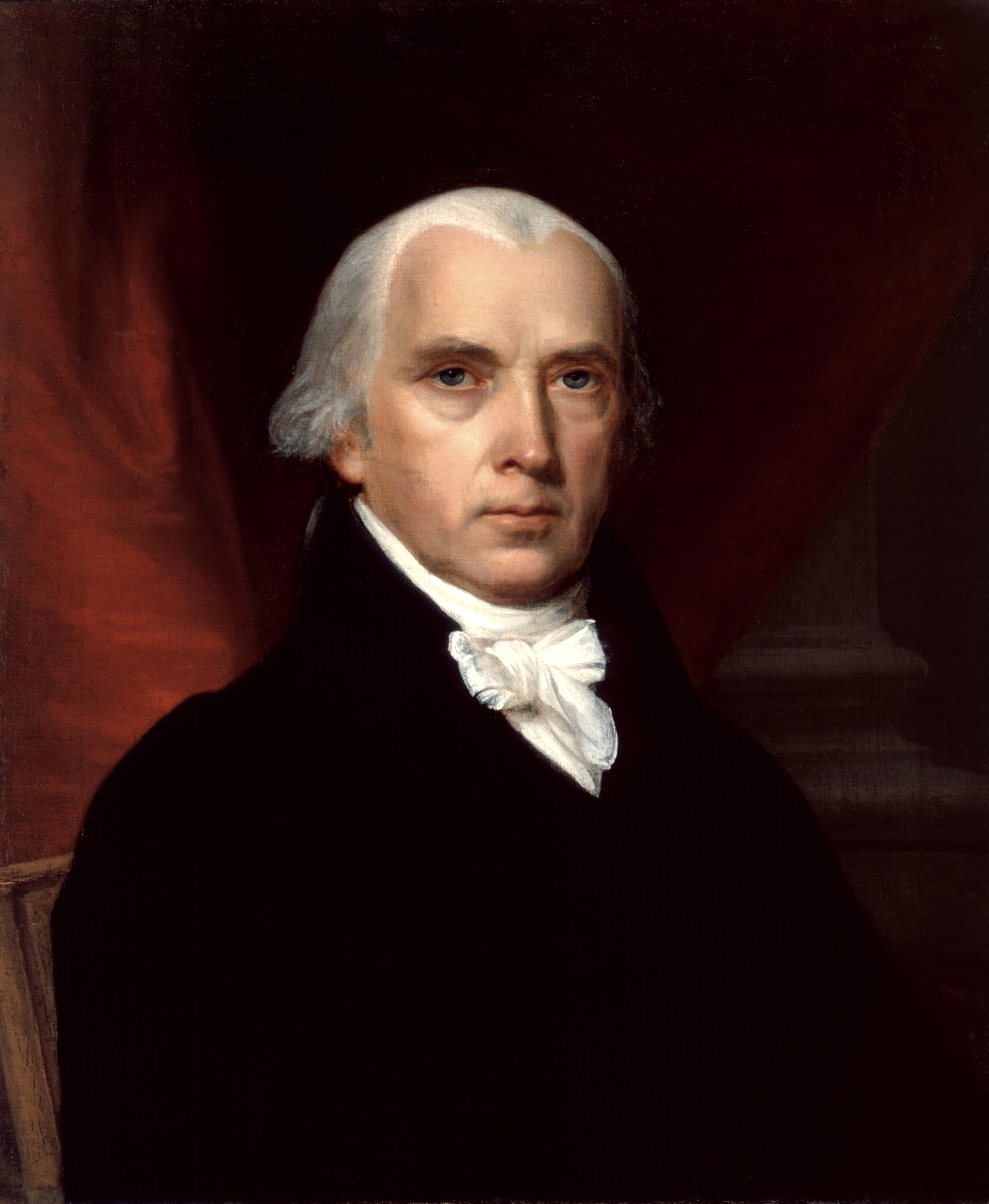
President
James Madison

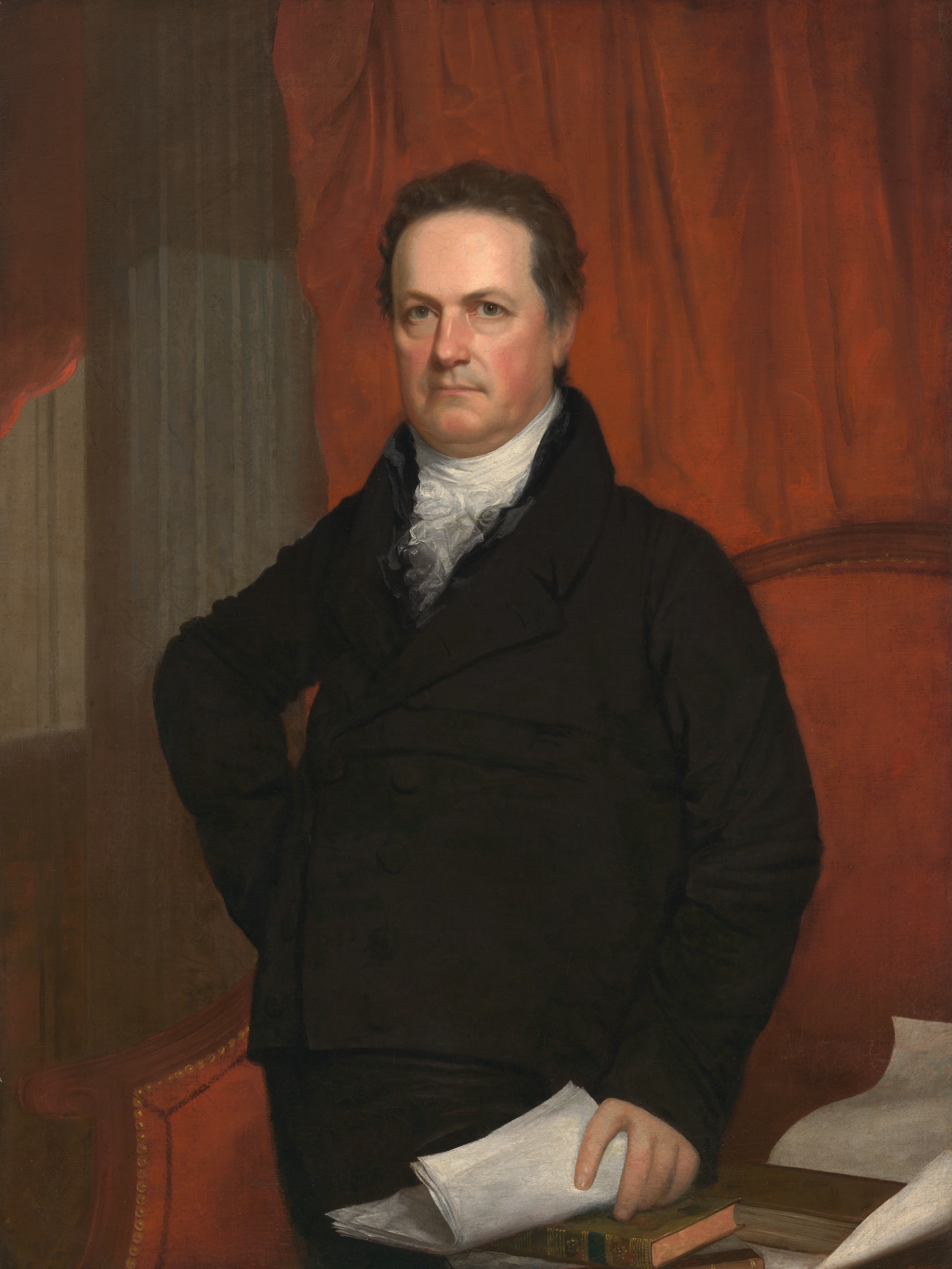
Mayor and Lt. Governor
DeWitt Clinton
of New York

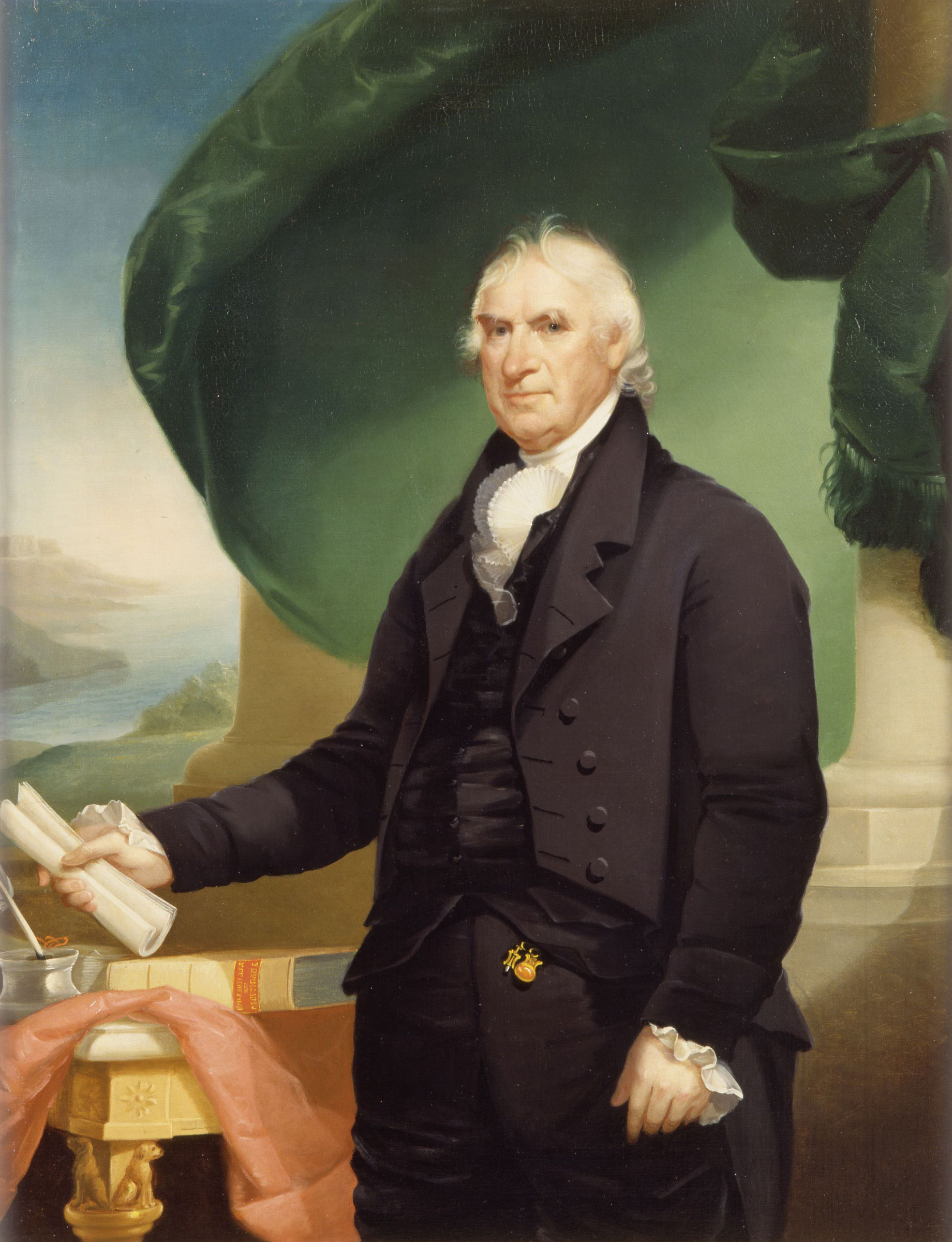
Vice President
George Clinton
(Died April 20)

Many Democratic-Republicans in the northern states were unhappy over the perceived dominance of the presidency by the state of Virginia (three of the last four presidents had been Virginians), and they wished instead to nominate one of their own rather than re-nominate President Madison. Initially, these hopes were pinned upon Vice President George Clinton, but his poor health and advanced age of 72 eliminated his chances. Even before Clinton's death on April 20, 1812, his nephew New York Lieutenant Governor DeWitt Clinton was considered the preferred candidate to move against Madison by the northern Democratic-Republicans.

Hoping to forestall a serious movement against President James Madison and a division of the Democratic-Republican Party, some proposed making DeWitt Clinton the nominee for the vice presidency, taking over the same office his uncle now held. DeWitt Clinton was not opposed to the offer, but preferred to wait until after the conclusion of the New York caucus, which would not be held until after the congressional caucus had met, to finalize his decision. Early caucuses were held in the states of Virginia and Pennsylvania, both of which pledged their support to Madison.

Eighty-three of the one hundred thirty-eight of the Democratic-Republican members of the United States Congress attended the nominating caucus in May 1812. The delegations from New York and New England had less representation due to the New York members supporting DeWitt Clinton's attempt to gain the support of the Federalists and the New England members opposing Madison's foreign policy. Eighty-two of the delegates voted to give the presidential nomination to Madison while John Langdon won the vice-presidential nomination against Elbridge Gerry by a vote of sixty-four to sixteen. However, Langdon declined the nomination citing his age and it was instead given to Gerry after another vote was held with seventy-four delegates voting for him.

When the New York caucus did meet on May 29, it was dominated by anti-war Democratic-Republicans, and nominated DeWitt Clinton for the presidency almost unanimously. Clinton's now open candidacy was opposed by many who, while not friends of James Madison, feared that Clinton was now apt to tear the Democratic-Republican party asunder. The matter of how to conduct his campaign also became a major problem for Clinton, especially with regards to the war with the British after June 12. Many of Clinton's supporters were war-hawks who advocated extreme measures to force the British into negotiations favorable to the United States, while Clinton knew he would have to appeal to Federalists to win, and they were almost wholly opposed to the war.

First Caucus Balloting
Presidential Ballot		Vice Presidential Ballot	
James Madison	81	John Langdon	64
Abstaining	1	Elbridge Gerry	16
		Scattering	2

Second Caucus Balloting
Vice Presidential Ballot
Elbridge Gerry	74
Scattering	3

=== Anti-Madison Ticket ===
Federalist Party 1812 Democratic-Republican New York Caucus Ticket
DeWitt Clinton	Jared Ingersoll
for President	for Vice President
5th Lieutenant Governor of New York (1811–1813); 47th, 49th and 51st Mayor of New York City (1803–1807, 1808–1810, & 1811–1815)	5th & 11th Attorney General of Pennsylvania (1791–1800 & 1811–1816)

Anti-Madison candidates:

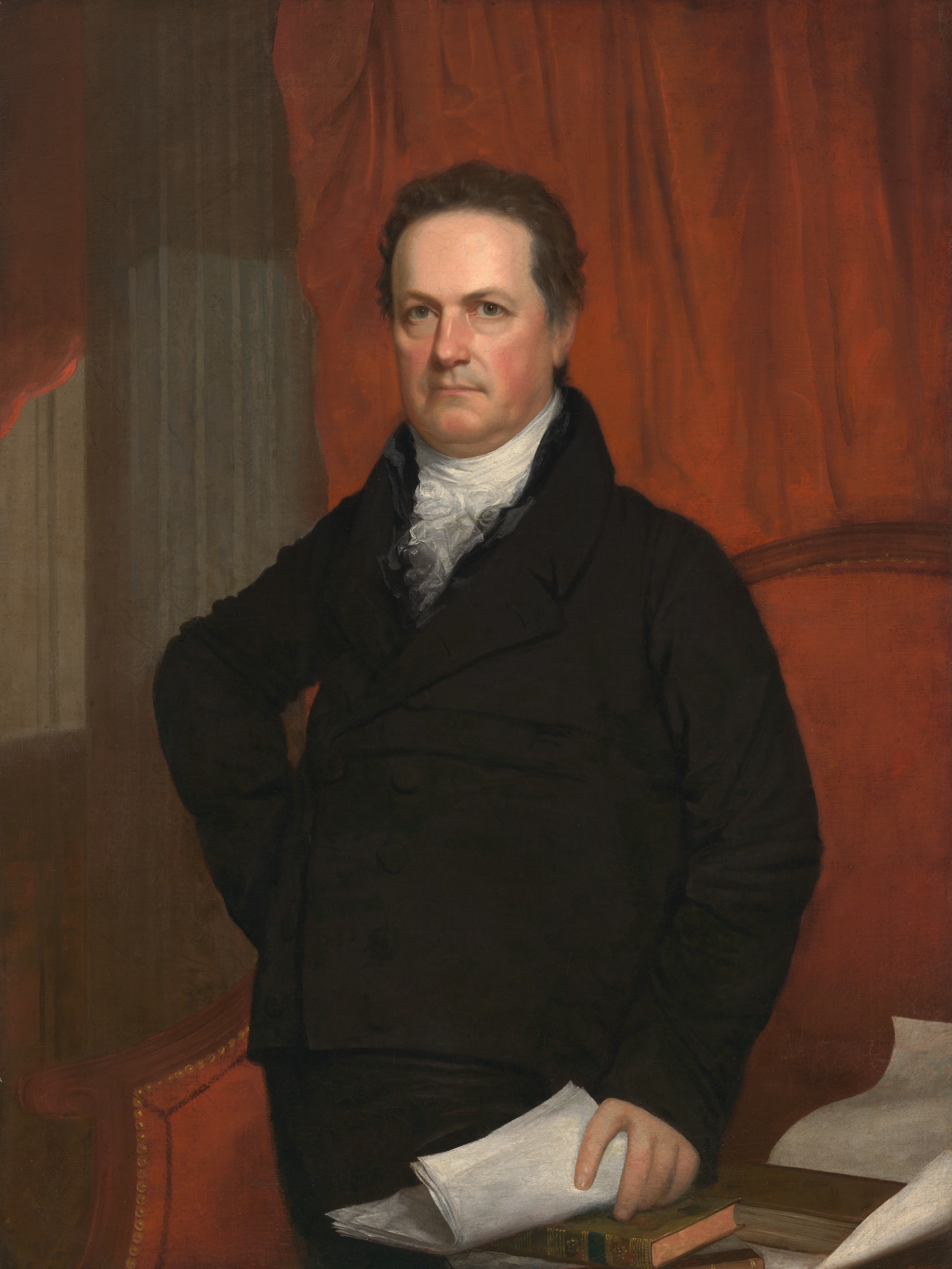
Mayor and Lt. Governor
DeWitt Clinton
of New York

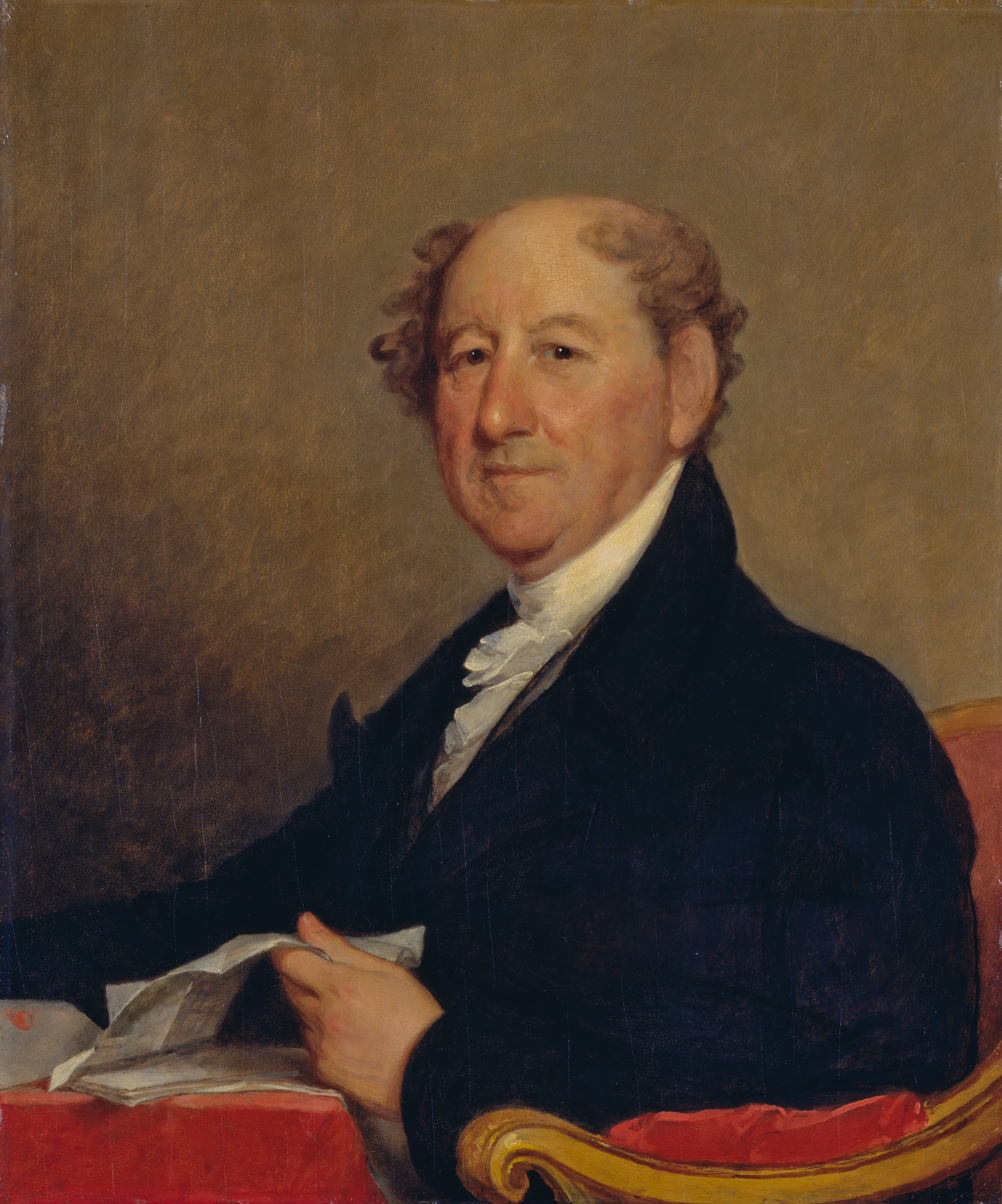
Former Minister to Great Britain
Rufus King
of New York
(Not nominated)

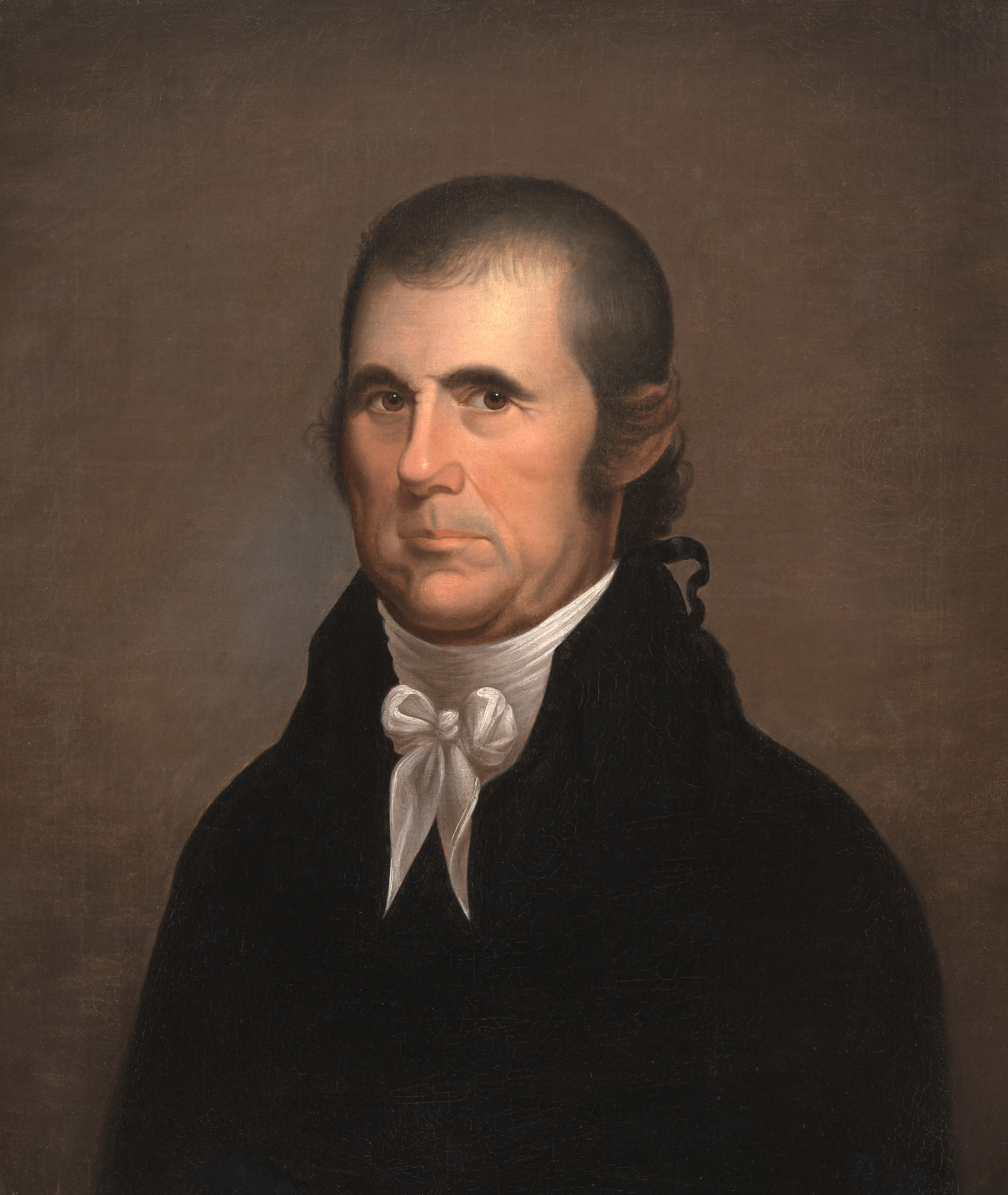
Chief Justice of the United States
John Marshall
(Declined to Contest)

While the Federalist Party had largely been viewed as moribund during the previous decade, following the defeat of President John Adams in 1800 and then the death of Alexander Hamilton four years later, the War of 1812 gave the party an issue they could rally around, leading many Federalists to believe they had a realistic chance of retaking the White House for the first time in over a decade.

Before Clinton entered the race as an alternative to President Madison, Chief Justice John Marshall was a favorite for the Federalist presidential nomination, a relatively popular figure who could carry much of the Northeast while potentially taking Virginia and North Carolina as well. Slavery was already becoming a divisive issue, however, and many northern Federalists were concerned that Marshall's being a slave owner would be a liability in the party's political base of New England, potentially alienating the very voters whose opposition to the war would be key to any prospect of a Federalist victory. Anti-slavery Federalists instead championed the prospective candidacy of Rufus King, a former Minister to Great Britain and their vice-presidential candidate at the previous two elections; King was known as a staunch opponent of slavery, but the moderates in the party felt that he had the opposite problem to Marshall, namely little appeal to voters outside of New England and King's native New York.

Clinton's entry into the race changed things dramatically, ensuring that the Federalists would no longer be able to count on the electoral votes of New York, possibly throwing the election into the House of Representatives, dominated by Democratic-Republicans, where Madison would almost certainly be elected. King nonetheless tried to advocate for the party to nominate their own candidate, but was prevented from pushing the issue too hard by the fact that Marshall had by this time disclaimed any interest in being the party's candidate, and King (who would thus have been the obvious favorite for the nomination if they chose not to endorse Clinton) did not wish to be seen as actively campaigning for the nomination, something seen as ungentlemanly by the standards of the time.

In the face of these facts, the Federalist party considered endorsing Clinton's candidacy for a time, but at their caucus in September it was decided that the party simply would not field a presidential candidate that year and did not endorse Clinton. Though there was much support among the Federalists for Clinton, it was felt that openly endorsing him as the party's choice for president would damage his chances in states where the Federalists remained unpopular and drive away Democratic-Republicans who would normally be supportive of his candidacy. A Federalist caucus in Pennsylvania chose to nominate Jared Ingersoll, the Attorney General of the state, as Clinton's vice presidential running-mate, a move Clinton decided to support considering the importance of Pennsylvania's electors.

=== Straight-Federalist nomination ===
Federalist Party 1812 Straight-Federalist Party Ticket
Rufus King	William R. Davie
for President	for Vice President
3rd U.S. Minister to Great Britain (1796–1803)	10th Governor of North Carolina (1798–1799)

While many Federalists were supportive of DeWitt Clinton's candidacy, others were not so keen, skeptical of Clinton's positions regarding the war and other matters. Rufus King, a former diplomat and Representative, had led an effort at the September Caucus to nominate a Federalist ticket for the election that year, though he was ultimately unsuccessful. Still, some wished to enter King's name into the race under the Federalist label, and while very little came of it, it caused problems for the Clinton campaign in two states.

In the case of Virginia, Clinton was rejected entirely by the state Federalist Party, which instead chose to nominate Rufus King for president and William Richardson Davie for vice president. The ticket would acquire about 27% of the vote in the state. In New York, with the Federalists having gained control of the state legislature that summer, it was planned that the Federalists would nominate a slate pledged to Rufus King now that they had the majority. However, a coalition of Democratic-Republicans and Federalists would defeat the motion and succeed in nominating a slate pledged to Clinton.

== General election ==
=== Campaign ===
The war heavily overshadowed the campaign. Clinton continued his regional campaigning, adopting an anti-war stance in the Northeast (which was most harmed by the war), and a pro-war stance in the South and West. The election ultimately hinged on New York and Pennsylvania, and while Clinton took his home state, he failed to take Pennsylvania and thus lost the election. Though Clinton lost, the election was the best showing for the Federalists since that of Adams, as the party made gains in Congress and kept the presidential election reasonably close. Clintonite Democratic-Republicans in many states refused to work with their Federalist counterparts (notably in Pennsylvania) and Clinton was generally regarded by most as the Federalist candidate, though he was not formally nominated by them.

=== Results ===
Madison was the first of just four presidents in United States history to win re-election with a lower percentage of the electoral vote than in their prior elections, as Madison won 69.3% of the electoral vote in 1808, but only won 58.7% of the electoral vote in 1812. The other three were Woodrow Wilson in 1916, Franklin D. Roosevelt in 1940 and 1944 and Barack Obama in 2012. Additionally, Madison was the first of only five presidents to win re-election with a smaller percentage of the popular vote than in prior elections, although in 1812, only 6 of the 18 states chose electors by popular vote. The other four are Andrew Jackson in 1832, Grover Cleveland in 1892, Franklin Roosevelt in 1940 and 1944, and Barack Obama in 2012.

This was the closest re-election for an incumbent president until the 2004 election.

James Madison was 5 ft 4 in (163 cm), and DeWitt Clinton stood 6 ft 0 in (183 cm). In no other US presidential election has the height difference between candidates (8 inches or 20 cm) been so great where the winner was the shorter candidate.

Electoral results
Presidential candidate	Party	Home state	Popular vote^{(a), (b)}		Electoral vote^{(c)}	Running mate		
Presidential candidate	Party	Home state	Count	Percentage	Electoral vote^{(c)}	Vice-presidential candidate	Home state	Electoral vote^{(c)}
James Madison (incumbent)	Democratic-Republican	Virginia	140,431	50.3%	128	Elbridge Gerry	Massachusetts	128
DeWitt Clinton	Democratic-Republican	New York	132,781	47.6%	89	Jared Ingersoll	Pennsylvania	86
DeWitt Clinton	Democratic-Republican	New York	132,781	47.6%	89	Elbridge Gerry	Massachusetts	3
Rufus King	Federalist	New York	5,583	2.1%	0	William R. Davie	North Carolina	0
Unpledged electors	None	N/A	661	0.2%	0	N/A	N/A	0
Total			279,456	100%	217			217
Needed to win					109			109

Source (Popular Vote): United States Presidential Elections, 1788-1860: The Official Results by Michael J. Dubin
Source (Popular Vote): A New Nation Votes: American Election Returns 1787–1825
Source (Electoral Vote): "Electoral College Box Scores 1789–1996". National Archives and Records Administration.

^{(a)} Only 9 of the 18 states chose electors by popular vote.
^{(b)} Those states that did choose electors by popular vote had widely varying restrictions on suffrage via property requirements.
^{(c)} One elector from Ohio did not vote.

Popular vote
Madison	50.3%
Clinton	47.6%
King	2.1%
Unpledged electors	0.2%

Electoral vote (presidential)
Madison	59%
Clinton	41%

Electoral vote (vice presidential)
Gerry	60.4%
Ingersoll	39.6%

=== Electoral votes by state ===
State	Electoral votes	For President			For Vice President		
State	Electoral votes	JM	DC	B	EG	JI	B
Connecticut	9	—	9	—	—	9	—
Delaware	4	—	4	—	—	4	—
Georgia	8	8	—	—	8	—	—
Kentucky	12	12	—	—	12	—	—
Louisiana	3	3	—	—	3	—	—
Maryland	11	6	5	—	6	5	—
Massachusetts	22	—	22	—	2	20	—
New Hampshire	8	—	8	—	1	7	—
New Jersey	8	—	8	—	—	8	—
New York	29	—	29	—	—	29	—
North Carolina	15	15	—	—	15	—	—
Ohio	7	7	—	—	7	—	—
Pennsylvania	25	25	—	—	25	—	—
Rhode Island	4	—	4	—	—	4	—
South Carolina	11	11	—	—	11	—	—
Tennessee	8	8	—	—	8	—	—
Vermont	8	8	—	—	8	—	—
Virginia	25	25	—	—	25	—	—
TOTAL	217	128	89	0	131	86	0
TO WIN	109				109		

=== Maps ===
Electoral College map (president)

Electoral College map (vice president)

Map of presidential election results by county, shaded according to the vote share of the highest result for an elector of any given candidate

Map of presidential election results by electoral district, shaded according to the vote share of the highest result for an elector of any given candidate. Electoral boundaries for Maryland and most of Tennessee could not be found

== Popular vote by state ==
Elections in this period were vastly different from modern day presidential elections. The actual presidential candidates were rarely mentioned on tickets and voters were voting for particular electors who were pledged to a particular candidate. There was sometimes confusion as to who the particular elector was actually pledged to. Results are reported as the highest result for an elector for any given candidate. For example, if three Madison electors received 100, 50, and 25 votes, Madison would be recorded as having 100 votes. Confusion surrounding the way results are reported may lead to discrepancies between the sum of all state results and national results.

Returns below are from A New Nation Votes. The vote totals of Kentucky appear to be incomplete, and those of Tennessee appear to be lost.

State (Electoral votes for Madison & Clinton)	James Madison Democratic-Republican		DeWitt Clinton Democratic-Republican		Rufus King Federalist		Other		Margin	
	#	%	#	%	#	%	#	%	#	%
Kentucky (12-0)	8,501+	92.17%	433+	4.69%	No ballots		289	3.13%	7,779	84.35%
Maryland (6-5)	13,970+	51.62%	13,091+	48.37%	No ballots		4	0.01%	875	3.24%
Massachusetts (0-22)	27,314	35.03%	50,639	64.95%	No ballots		13+	0.02%	-23,338	-29.94%
New Hampshire (0-8)	15,907	43.89%	20,286	55.97%	No ballots		49	0.14%	-4,428	-12.22%
Ohio (7-0)	7,420	69.2%	3,301	30.8%	No ballots		No ballots		4,119	38.4%
Pennsylvania (25-0)	best performing elector was run on both the Madison and Clinton tickets (Note: The best performing elector in Pennsylvania, David Mead, was run on both the Madison and Clinton tickets. He received 79,128 votes, more than any other elector in the state. As to not represent Pennsylvania voters twice in popular vote figures, the votes have been split proportionally to the rest of the slates (62.64%-37.36%))				No ballots		3	<0.01%	79,125	>99.99%
Rhode Island (0-4)	2,084	34.07%	4,032	65.93%	No ballots		No ballots		-1,948	-31.86%
Tennessee (8-0)	No data	100%	No ballots		No ballots		No ballots		No data	100%
Virginia (25-0)	15,128	71.99%	No ballots		5,583	26.57%	303	1.44%	9,241	43.98%

=== States that flipped from Democratic-Republican to Federalist ===
- New York
- New Jersey

=== States where the margin of victory was under 5% ===
1. Maryland, 3.24% (875 votes)

== Electoral college selection ==
Method of choosing electors	State(s)
Each elector appointed by state legislature	Connecticut; Delaware; Georgia; Louisiana; New Jersey; New York; North Carolina; South Carolina; Vermont
Each elector chosen by voters statewide	New Hampshire; Ohio; Pennsylvania; Rhode Island; Virginia
State is divided into three electoral districts, with four electors chosen per district by the voters of each district	Kentucky
State is divided into electoral districts, with one elector chosen per district by the voters of that district	Maryland; Tennessee
Two electors chosen by voters statewide; One elector chosen per congressional district by the voters of that district	Massachusetts

In New Jersey, Federalists had just taken over the state legislature and decided to change the method of choosing electors from a general election to appointment by state legislature. Some towns, possibly too far away to get the news, or in open defiance of the switch, held elections anyway. These were not counted nor reported by the newspapers. In the unofficial elections, Madison received 1,672 votes while Clinton only received 2, suggesting these were protest votes (New Jersey was far more competitive than this at the time).

== See also ==
- History of the United States (1789–1849)
- 1812–13 United States House of Representatives elections
- 1812–13 United States Senate elections
- Second inauguration of James Madison

== Bibliography ==
- Boller, Paul F. Jr. (2004). Presidential Campaigns: From George Washington to George W. Bush. Oxford: Oxford University Press. pp. 26–28. ISBN 978-0-19-516716-0.
- Siry, Steven Edwin (1985). "The Sectional Politics of "Practical Republicanism": De Witt Clinton's Presidential Bid, 1810–1812". Journal of the Early Republic. 5 (4): 441–462. doi:10.2307/3123061. JSTOR 3123061.
- Zinman, Donald A. (2024). America's First Wartime Election: James Madison, DeWitt Clinton, and the War of 1812. Lawrence, KS: University Press of Kansas. ISBN 9780700637799.
- A New Nation Votes: American Election Returns, 1787–1825
