= 1812 United States presidential election in New Hampshire =

- October 30 – December 2, 1812
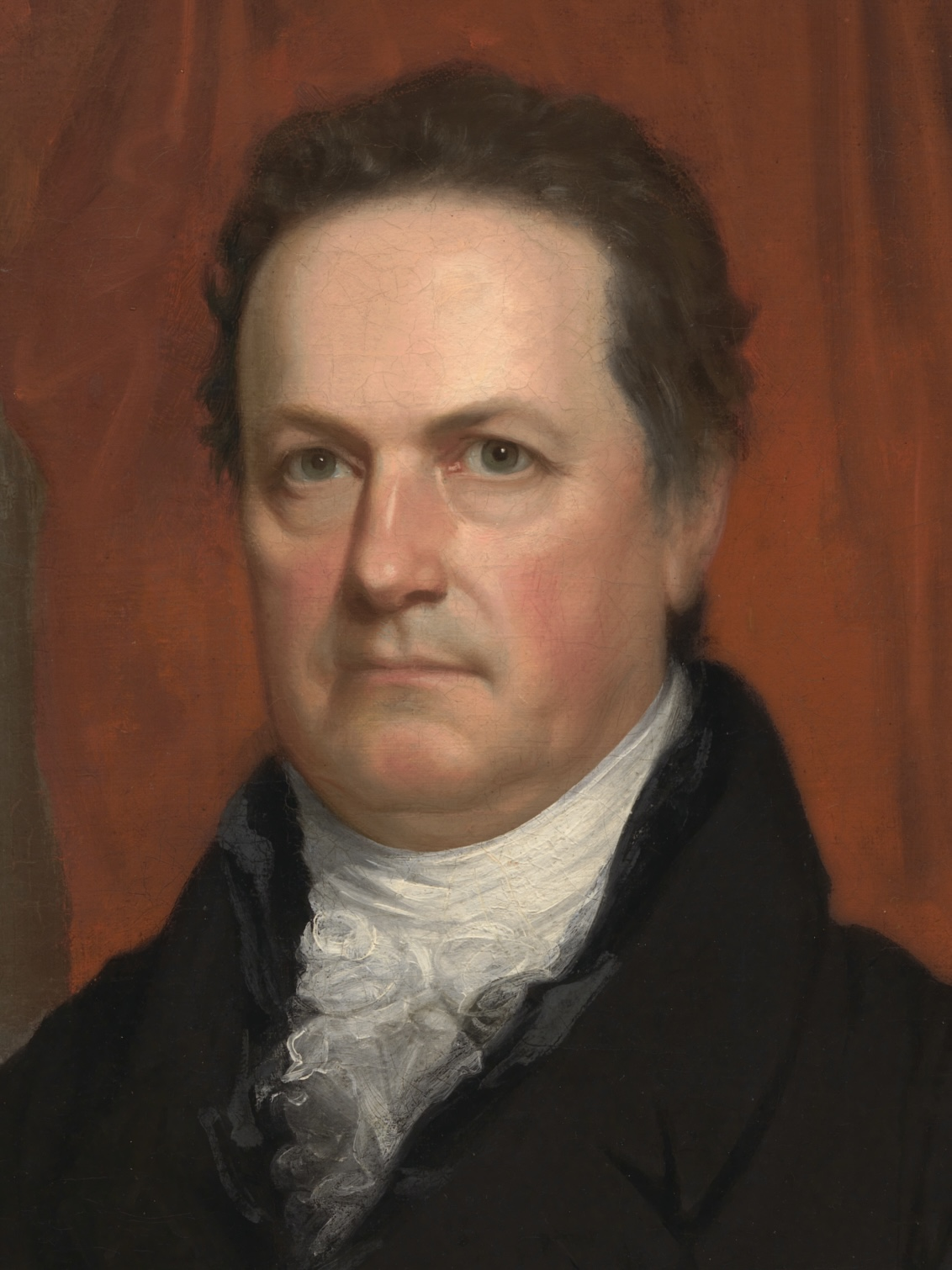

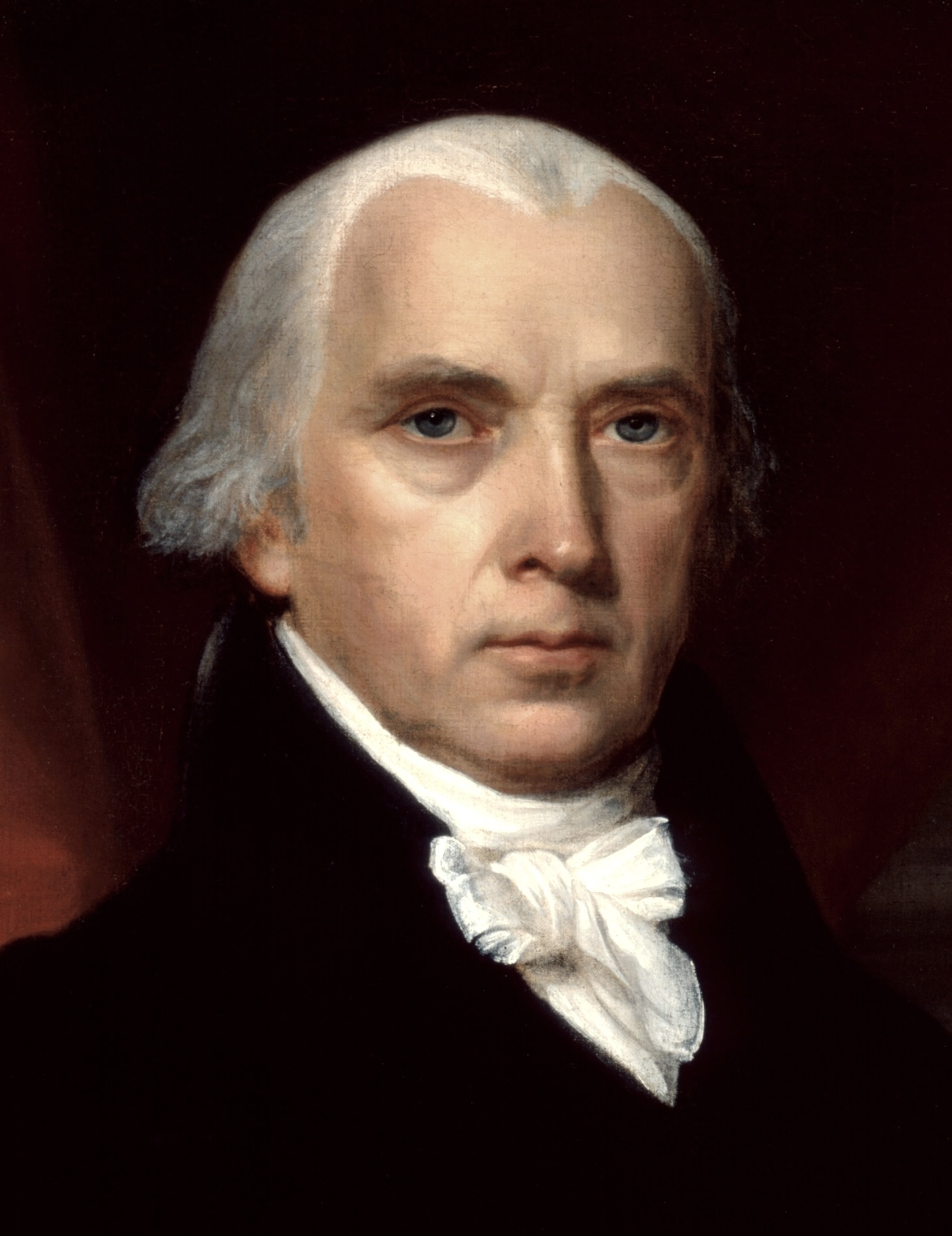
Nominee	DeWitt Clinton	James Madison
Party	Democratic-Republican (Note: While commonly labeled as the Federalist candidate, Clinton technically ran as a Democratic-Republican and was not nominated by the Federalist party itself, the latter simply deciding not to field a candidate. This did not prevent endorsements from state Federalist parties (such as in Pennsylvania), but he received the endorsement from the New York state Democratic-Republicans as well)	Democratic-Republican
Alliance	Federalist
Home state	New York	Virginia
Running mate	Jared Ingersoll	Elbridge Gerry (Note: John Langdon had originally been nominated as Madison's running mate, however Langdon declined the nomination and Gerry was chosen instead.)
Electoral vote	8	–
Popular vote	20,286	15,907
Percentage	55.97%	43.89%
County results
Clinton
50–60%
60–70%
Madison
50–60%
President before election
James Madison
Democratic-Republican
Elected President
James Madison
Democratic-Republican

The 1812 United States presidential election in New Hampshire took place between October 30 and December 2, 1812, as part of the 1812 United States presidential election. Voters chose five representatives, or electors, to the Electoral College, who voted for president and vice president.

New Hampshire voted for Democratic-Republican and Federalist-supported candidate and lieutenant governor of New York DeWitt Clinton over the incumbent Democratic-Republican President James Madison by a margin of 12.22%.

Although Clinton won the state's presidential election, he lost to Madison in the national presidential election, making this the third time New Hampshire voted for a losing candidate in its presidential voting history.

== Results ==
1812 United States presidential election in New Hampshire
Party	Candidate	Votes	Percentage	Electoral votes
Democratic-Republican/Federalist	DeWitt Clinton	20,286	55.97%	8
Democratic-Republican	James Madison (incumbent)	15,907	43.89%	–
–	Other	49	0.14%	–
Totals		36,242	100.00%	8

== See also ==
- United States presidential elections in New Hampshire
