= 1812 United States presidential election in Virginia =

- October 30 – December 2, 1812
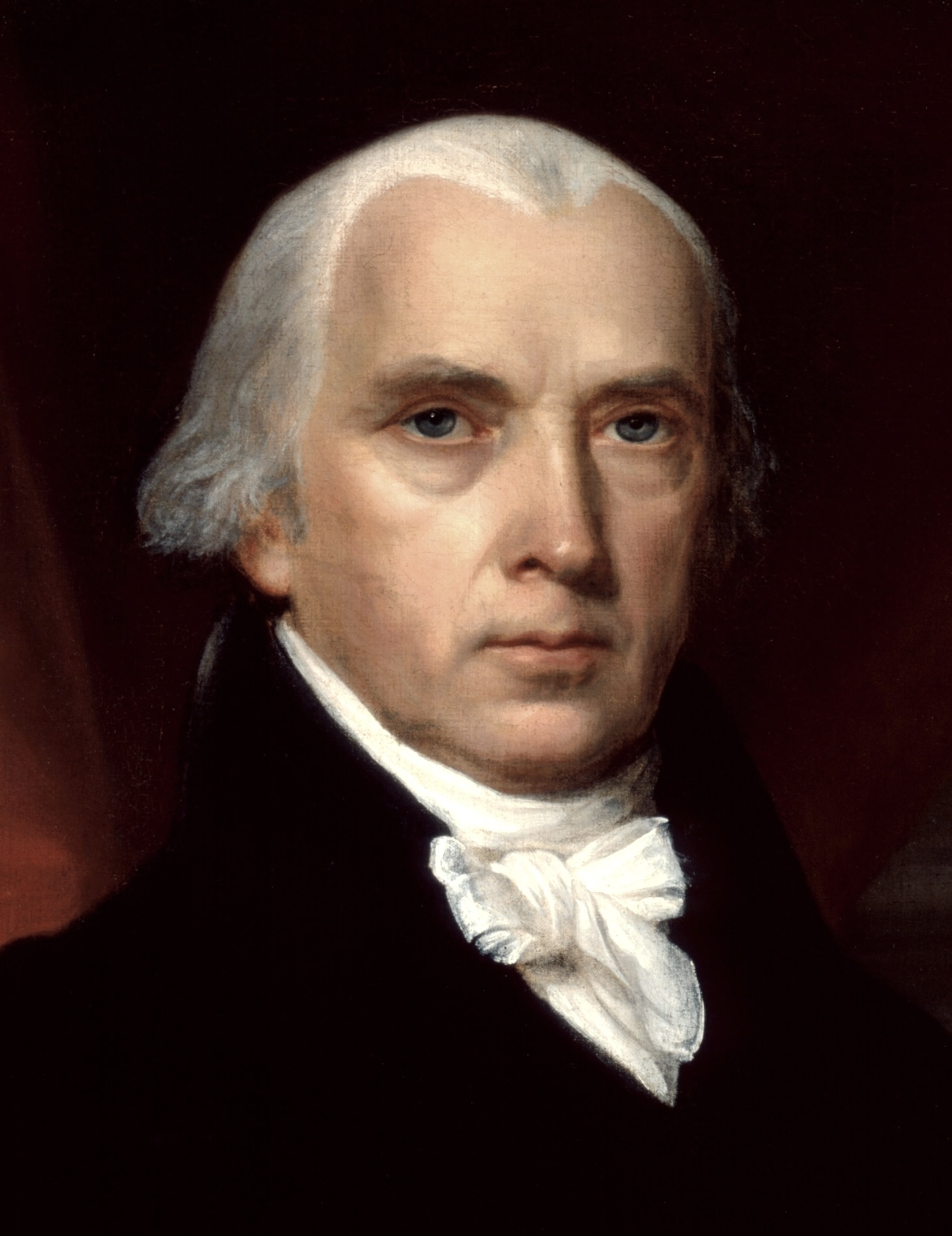

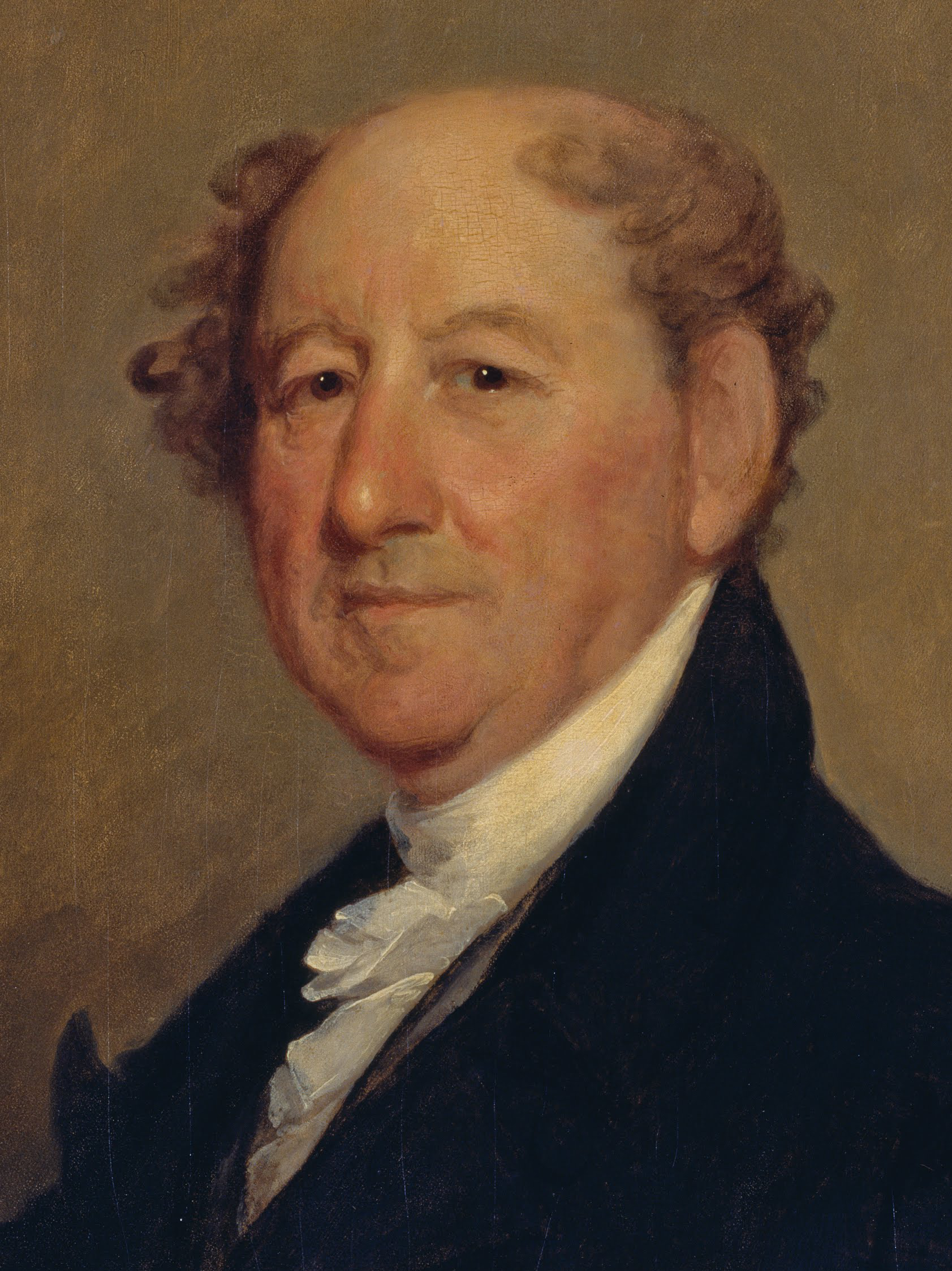
Nominee	James Madison	Rufus King
Party	Democratic-Republican	Federalist
Home state	Virginia	New York
Running mate	Elbridge Gerry	William R. Davie
Electoral vote	25	0
Popular vote	15,127	5,574
Percentage	73.07%	26.93%
County results
Madison
50–60%
60–70%
70–80%
80–90%
90–100%
King
50–60%
60–70%
70–80%
80–90%
90–100%
President before election
James Madison
Democratic-Republican
Elected President
James Madison
Democratic-Republican

The 1812 United States presidential election in Virginia took place between October 30 and December 2, 1812, as part of the 1812 United States presidential election. Voters chose 25 representatives, or electors to the Electoral College, who voted for President and Vice President.

Virginia voted for the Democratic-Republican candidate and incumbent president, James Madison. Madison won Virginia, his home state, by a margin of 46.2%.

The race in the state was noteworthy for a dispute within the Federalist Party, who had formed an unofficial pact to support rebel Democratic-Republican candidate DeWitt Clinton nationwide, while putting up Federalist candidate Jared Ingersoll as Clinton's running-mate. The Virginia state Federalist Party rejected this pact, however, and instead nominated Rufus King, the party's vice-presidential candidate in the two previous elections, for president, while nominating William Richardson Davie as King's running-mate. Despite the state's substantial number of presidential electors and the closeness of the race nationally, the dispute did not have a major impact on the election's outcome, as Madison was never considered likely to lose his home state.

== See also ==
- United States presidential elections in Virginia
