= 1812 United States presidential election in Massachusetts =

- November 1–3, 1812
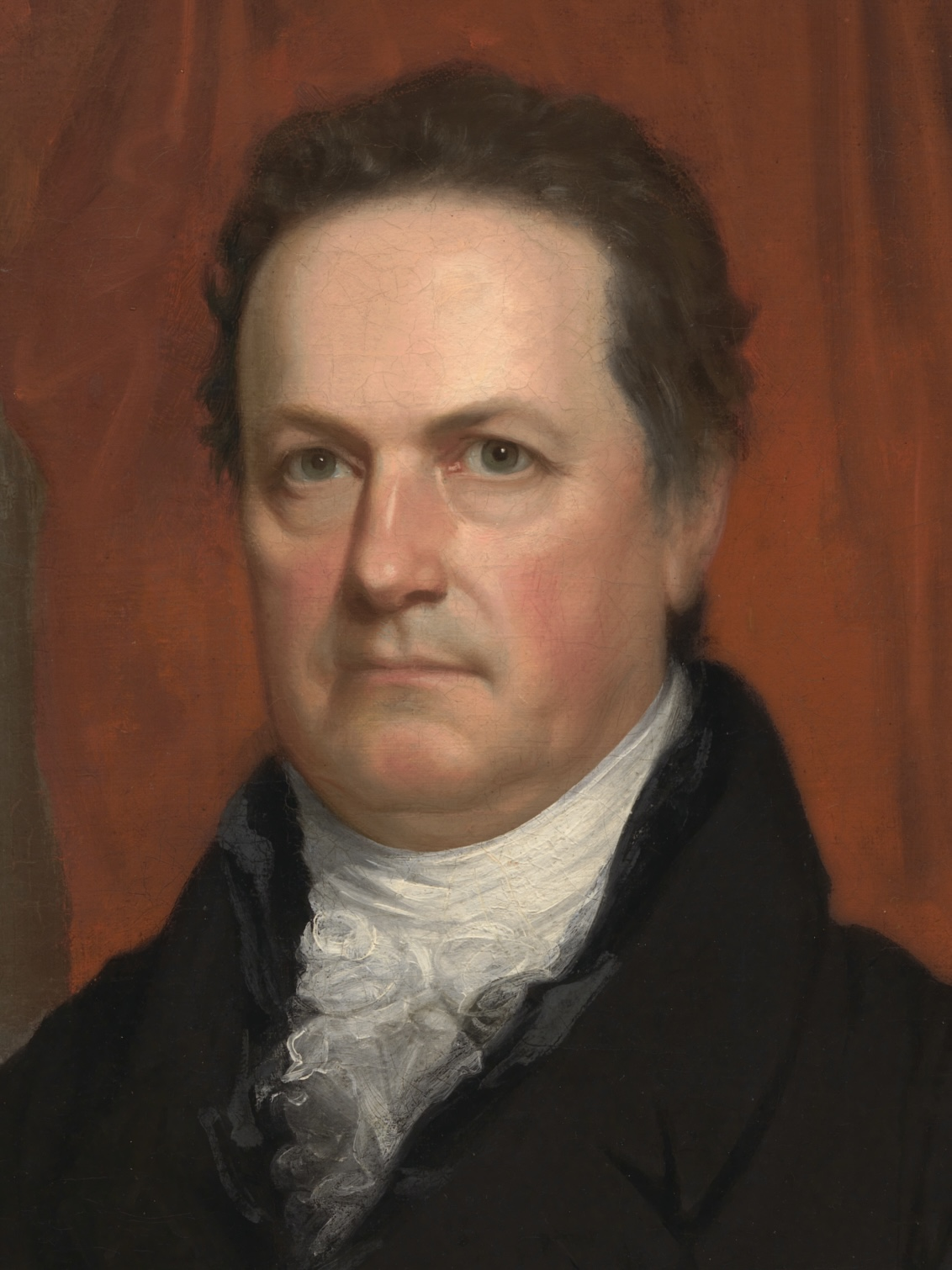

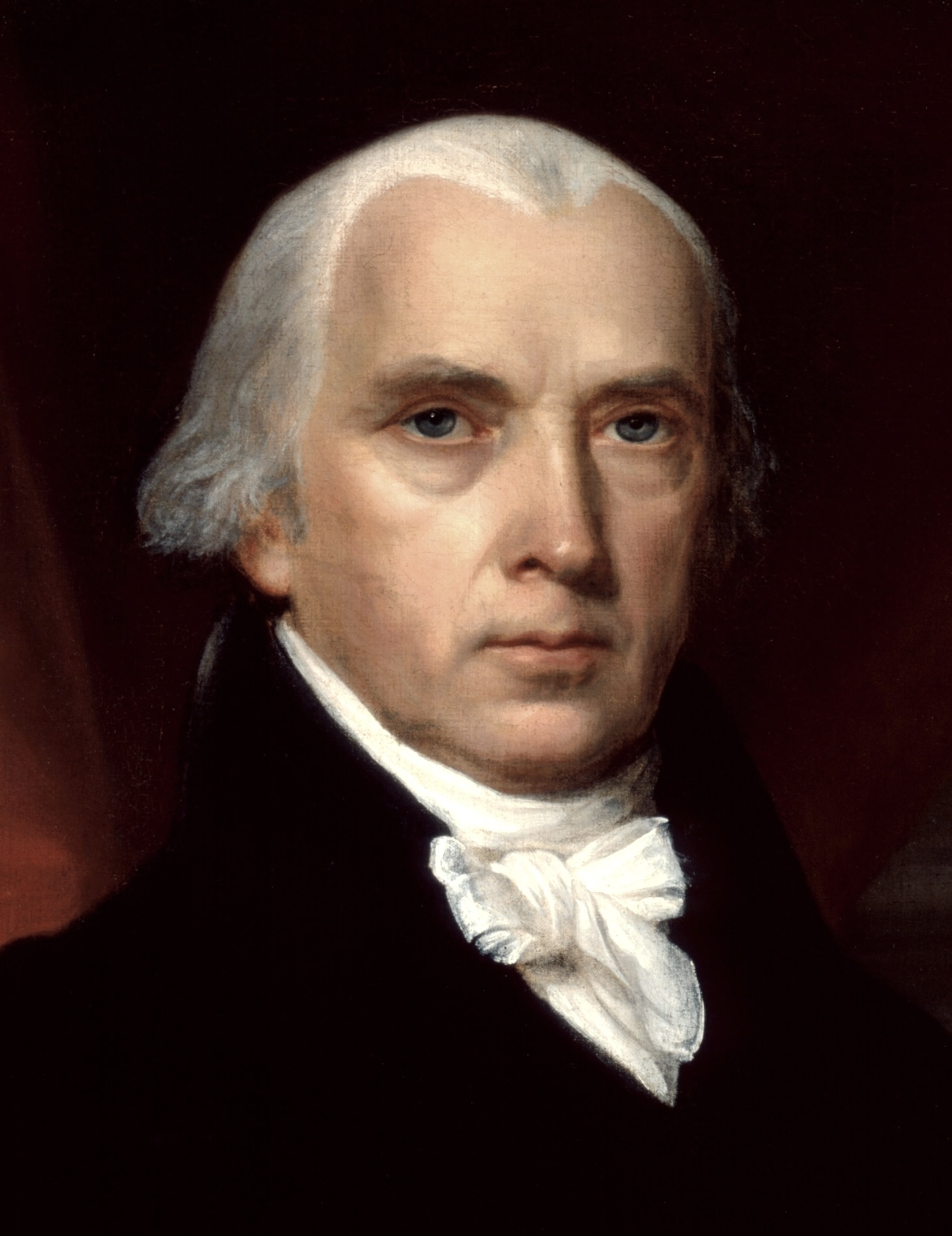
Nominee	DeWitt Clinton	James Madison
Party	Democratic-Republican (Note: While commonly labeled as the Federalist candidate, Clinton technically ran as a Democratic-Republican and was not nominated by the Federalist party itself, the latter simply deciding not to field a candidate. This did not prevent endorsements from state Federalist parties (such as in Pennsylvania), but he received the endorsement from the New York state Democratic-Republicans as well.)	Democratic-Republican
Alliance	Federalist
Running mate	Jared Ingersoll (Note: 3 electors from Massachusetts instead voted for Elbridge Gerry for Vice President)	Elbridge Gerry
Electoral vote	22	0
Popular vote	50,488	27,169
Percentage	65.01%	34.99%
County results
Clinton
50–60%
60–70%
70–80%
90–100%
Madison
50–60%
President before election
James Madison
Democratic-Republican
Elected President
James Madison
Democratic-Republican

The 1812 United States presidential election in Massachusetts took place between November 1 and 3, 1812, as part of the 1812 United States presidential election. Voters chose 22 representatives, or electors to the Electoral College, who voted for president and vice president.

During this election, both candidates technically ran as Democratic-Republicans as the Federalist Party chose not to field a candidate nationally. DeWitt Clinton won all 22 Massachusetts state electors by a wide margin of 30.02%, despite the fact that Massachusetts governor Elbridge Gerry was on the ballot, but he lost the general election to the incumbent president James Madison.

== Results ==
1812 United States presidential election in Massachusetts
Party	Candidate	Votes	Percentage	Electoral votes
Democratic-Republican/Federalist	DeWitt Clinton	50,488	65.01%	22
Democratic-Republican	James Madison (incumbent)	27,169	34.99%	0
Totals		77,657	100.00%	22

1812 vice presidential electoral vote
Party	Candidate	Electoral votes
Democratic-Republican/Federalist	Jared Ingersoll	20
Democratic-Republican	Elbridge Gerry (incumbent)	2
Totals		22

== See also ==
- United States presidential elections in Massachusetts
