= 1812 United States presidential election in Kentucky =

- October 30 – December 2, 1812
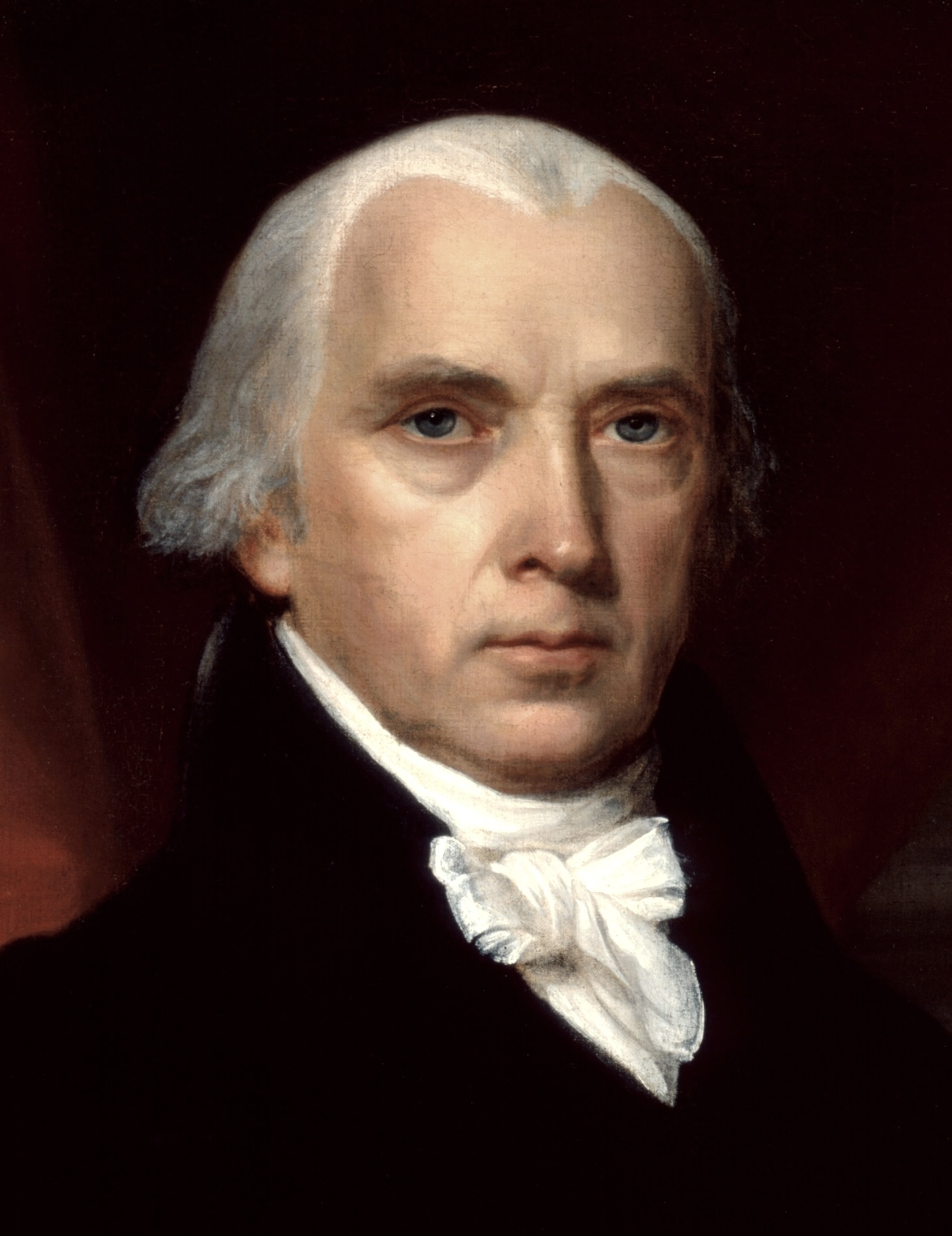

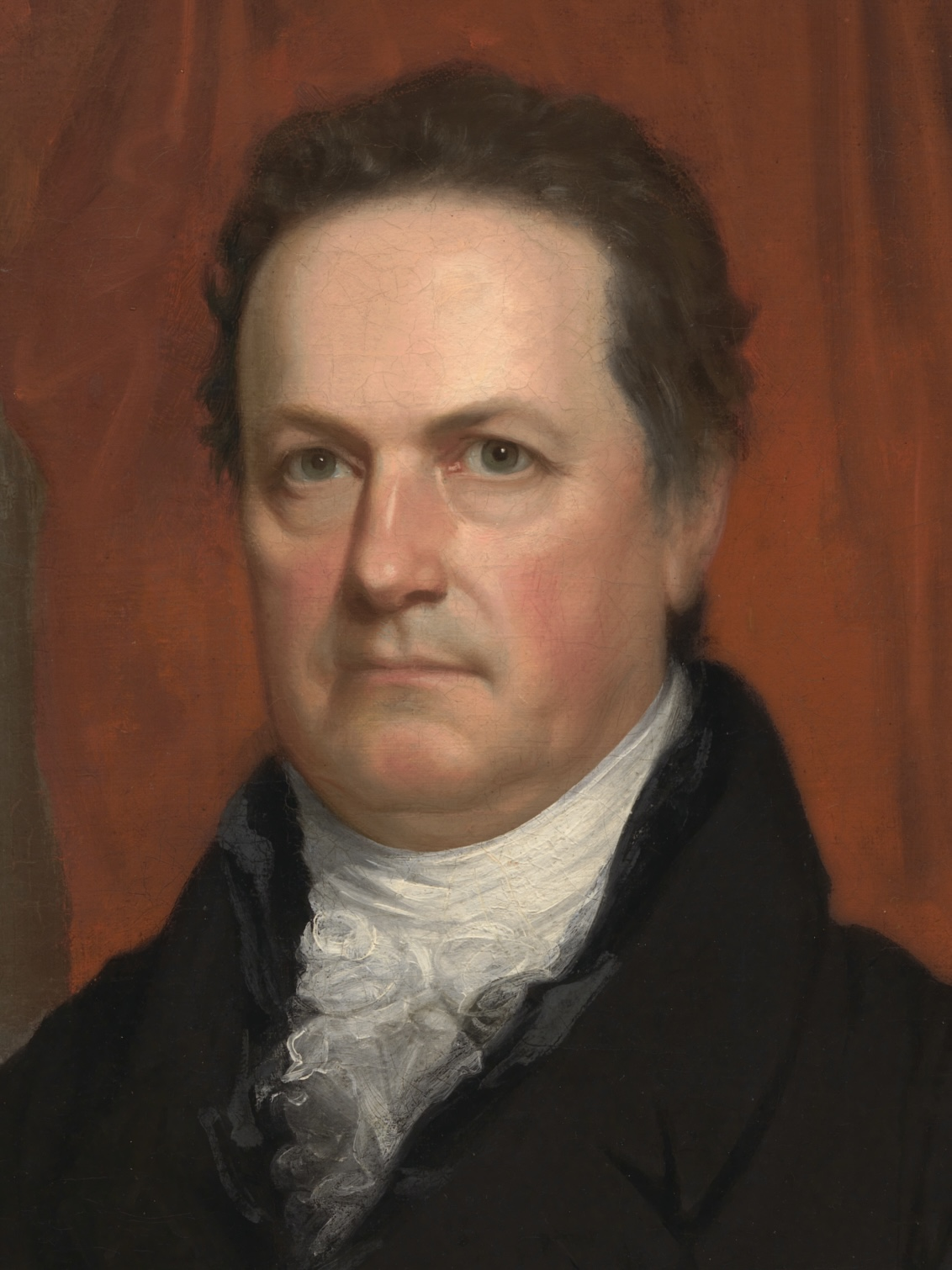
Nominee	James Madison	DeWitt Clinton
Party	Democratic-Republican	Democratic-Republican (Note: While commonly labeled as the Federalist candidate, Clinton technically ran as a Democratic-Republican and was not nominated by the Federalist party itself, the latter simply deciding not to field a candidate. This did not prevent endorsements from state Federalist parties (such as in Pennsylvania), but he received the endorsement from the New York state Democratic-Republicans as well.)
Alliance		Federalist
Home state	Virginia	New York
Running mate	Elbridge Gerry	Jared Ingersoll
Electoral vote	12	0
Popular vote	8,501	433
Percentage	95.2%	4.8%

The 1812 United States presidential election in Kentucky took place between October 30 and December 2, 1812, as part of the 1812 United States presidential election. Voters chose twelve representatives, or electors to the Electoral College, who voted for President and Vice President. Kentucky had gained four electors compared to the previous election in 1808.

Kentucky cast twelve electoral votes for the Democratic-Republican candidate and incumbent President James Madison over the other Democratic-Republican and Federalist supported candidate DeWitt Clinton. The electoral votes for Vice president were cast for Madison's running mate Elbridge Gerry from Massachusetts. The state was divided into three electoral districts with four electors each, whereupon each district's voters chose the electors.

== Results ==
1812 United States presidential election in Kentucky
Party	Candidate	Votes	Percentage	Electoral votes
Democratic-Republican	James Madison (incumbent)	8,501	95.2%	12
Democratic-Republican/Federalist	DeWitt Clinton	433	4.8%	0
Totals		8,934	100.0%	12

== See also ==
- United States presidential elections in Kentucky
