= 1812 United States presidential election in Rhode Island =

- October 30 – December 2, 1812
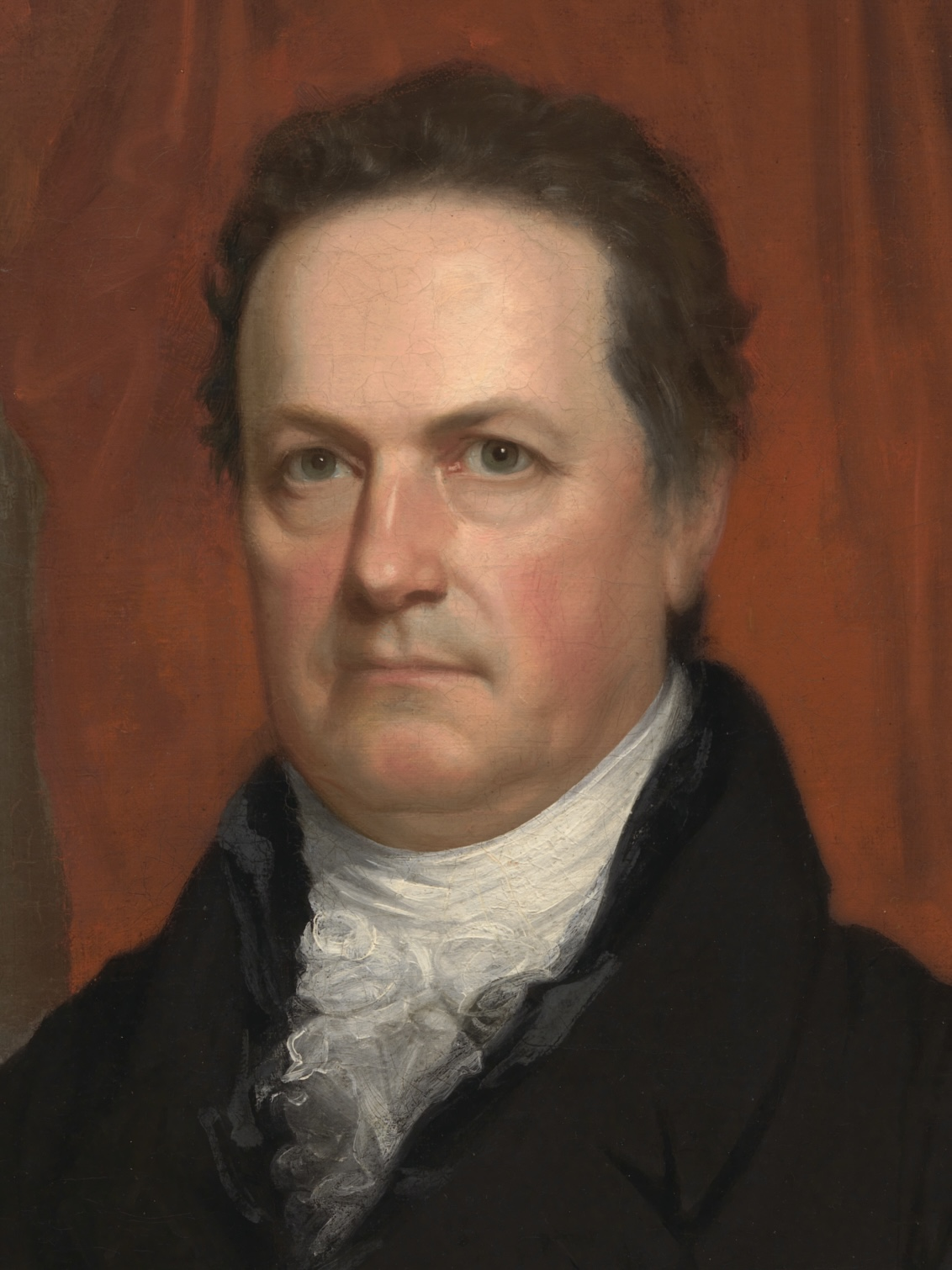

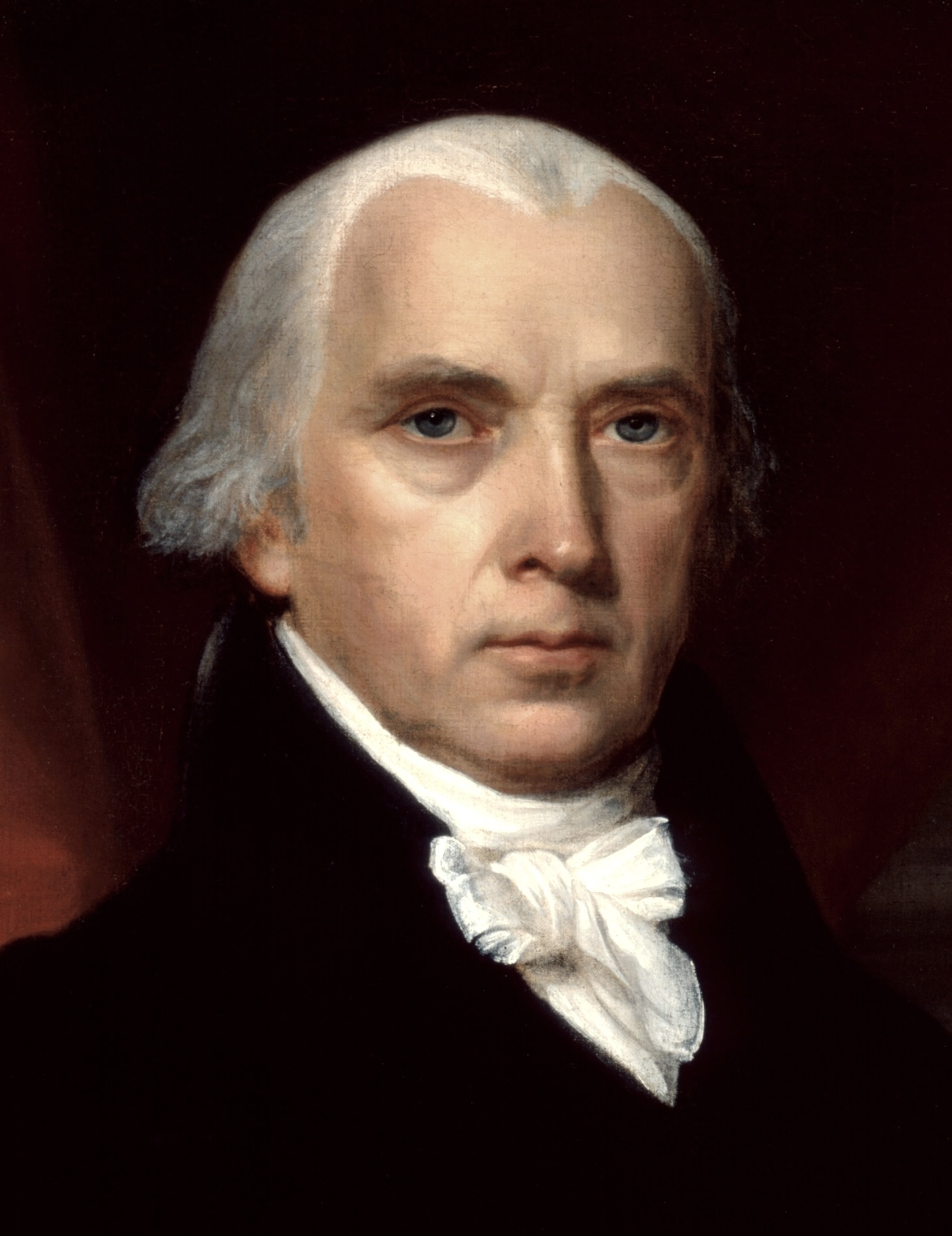
Nominee	DeWitt Clinton	James Madison
Party	Democratic-Republican (Note: While commonly labeled as the Federalist candidate, Clinton technically ran as a Democratic-Republican and was not nominated by the Federalist party itself, the latter simply deciding not to field a candidate. This did not prevent endorsements from state Federalist parties (such as in Pennsylvania), but he received the endorsement from the New York state Democratic-Republicans as well.)	Democratic-Republican
Alliance	Federalist
Running mate	Jared Ingersoll	Elbridge Gerry
Electoral vote	4	0
Popular vote	4,032	2,084
Percentage	65.93%	34.07%

Clinton
50-60%
60-70%
70-80%
80-90%
90-100%
Madison
50-60%
60-70%
70-80%
President before election
James Madison
Democratic-Republican
Elected President
James Madison
Democratic-Republican

The 1812 United States presidential election in Rhode Island took place as part of the 1812 United States presidential election. Voters chose four representatives, or electors, to the Electoral College, who voted for president and vice president.

Rhode Island voted for the Democratic-Republican and Federalist supported candidate, DeWitt Clinton, over normal Democratic-Republican candidate, incumbent President James Madison. Clinton won Rhode Island by a margin of 65.93%. With Madison's second loss (the first one was 1808), this marked the first time that a candidate or an incumbent president lost two presidential elections in Rhode Island.

== Results ==
1812 United States presidential election in Rhode Island
Party	Candidate	Votes	Percentage	Electoral votes
Democratic-Republican/Federalist	DeWitt Clinton	4,032	65.93%	4
Democratic-Republican	James Madison	2,084	34.07%	–
Totals		6,116	100.00%	4

== See also ==
- United States presidential elections in Rhode Island
