= 1812 United States presidential election in Ohio =

- October 30 – December 2, 1812
- Turnout: 19.7% ▲5.5 pp
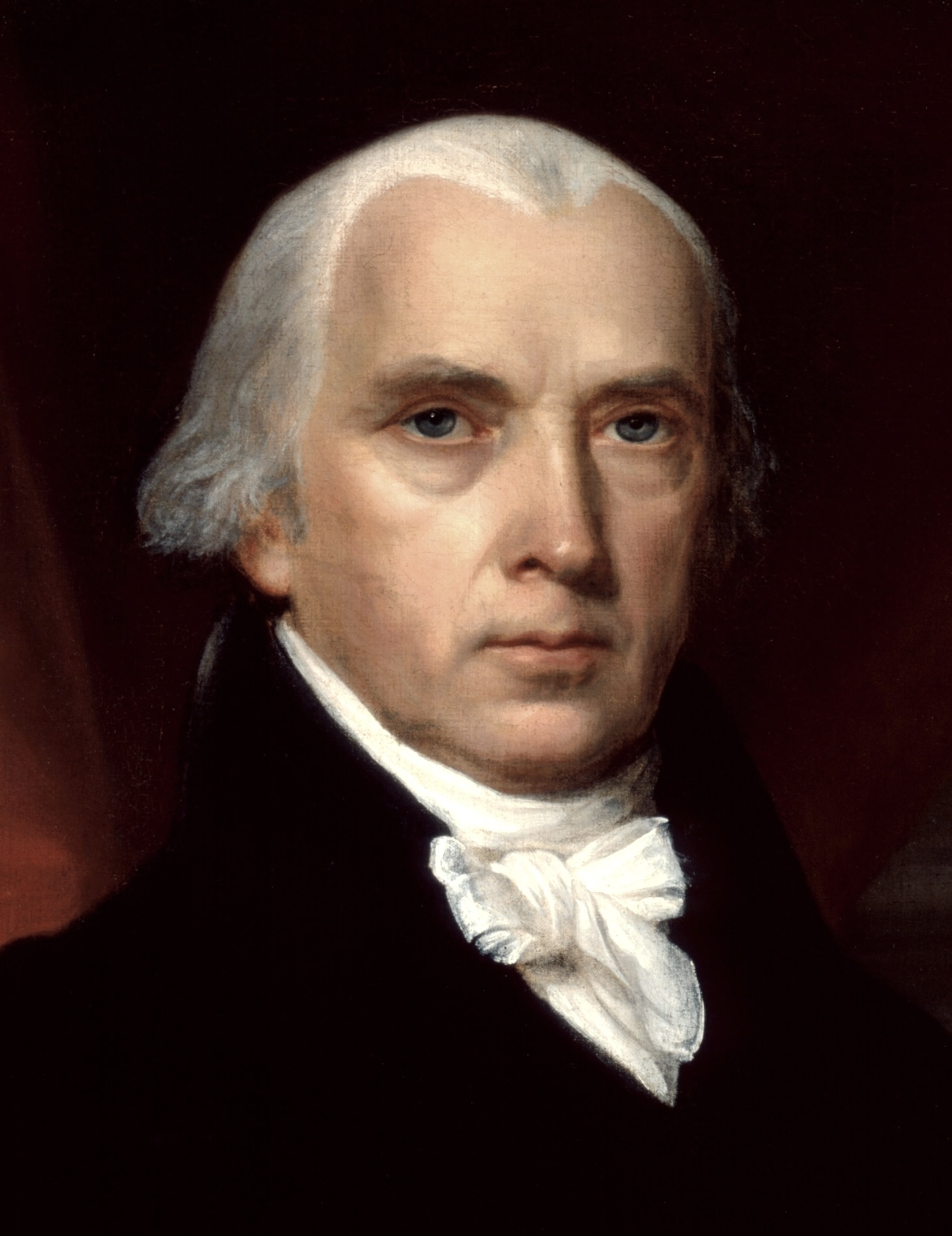

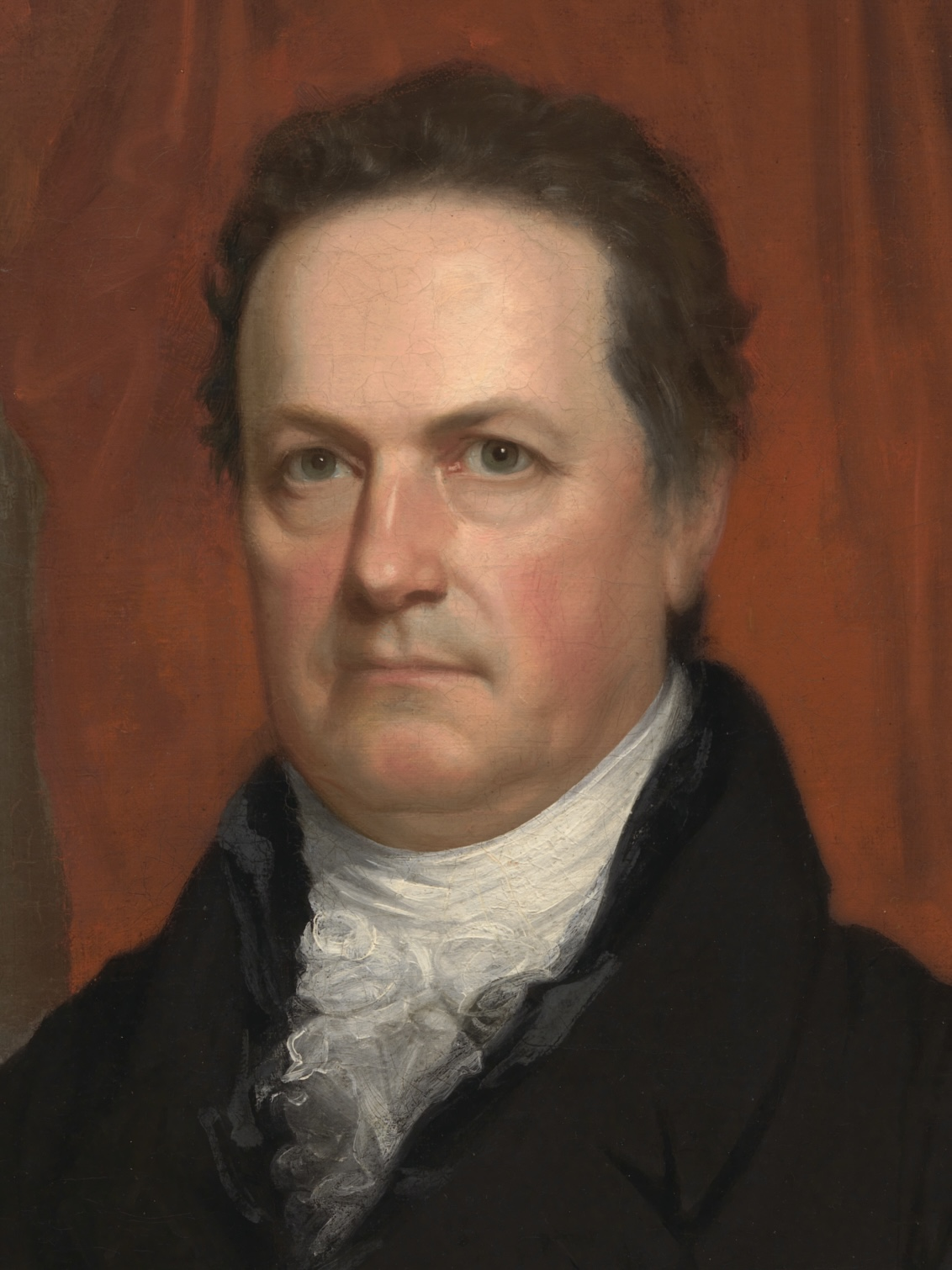
Nominee	James Madison	DeWitt Clinton
Party	Democratic-Republican	Democratic-Republican (Note: While commonly labeled as the Federalist candidate, Clinton technically ran as a Democratic-Republican and was not nominated by the Federalist party itself, the latter simply deciding not to field a candidate. This did not prevent endorsements from state Federalist parties (such as in Pennsylvania), but he received the endorsement from the New York state Democratic-Republicans as well)
Alliance		Federalist
Home state	Virginia	New York
Running mate	Elbridge Gerry	Jared Ingersoll
Electoral vote	8	0
Popular vote	7,420	3,301
Percentage	69.21%	30.79%
President before election
James Madison
Democratic-Republican
Elected President
James Madison
Democratic-Republican

The 1812 United States presidential election in Ohio took place as part of the 1812 United States presidential election. Voters chose 8 representatives, or electors to the Electoral College, who voted for President and Vice President.

Ohio re-elected incumbent Democratic-Republican President James Madison over the other Democratic-Republican and Federalist supported candidate DeWitt Clinton. Madison won Ohio by a margin of 38.42%.

== Results ==
1812 United States presidential election in Ohio
Party	Candidate	Votes	Percentage	Electoral votes
Democratic-Republican	James Madison (incumbent)	7,420	69.21%	8
Democratic–Republican Party	DeWitt Clinton	3,301	30.79%	0
Totals		10,721	100.0%	8

== See also ==
- United States presidential elections in Ohio

== Bibliography ==
- Ratcliffe, Donald J. (Autumn 1987). "Voter Turnout in Early Ohio". Journal of the Early Republic. 7 (3): 223–51. JSTOR 3123782.
