= 1812 United States presidential election in Maryland =

- 1812
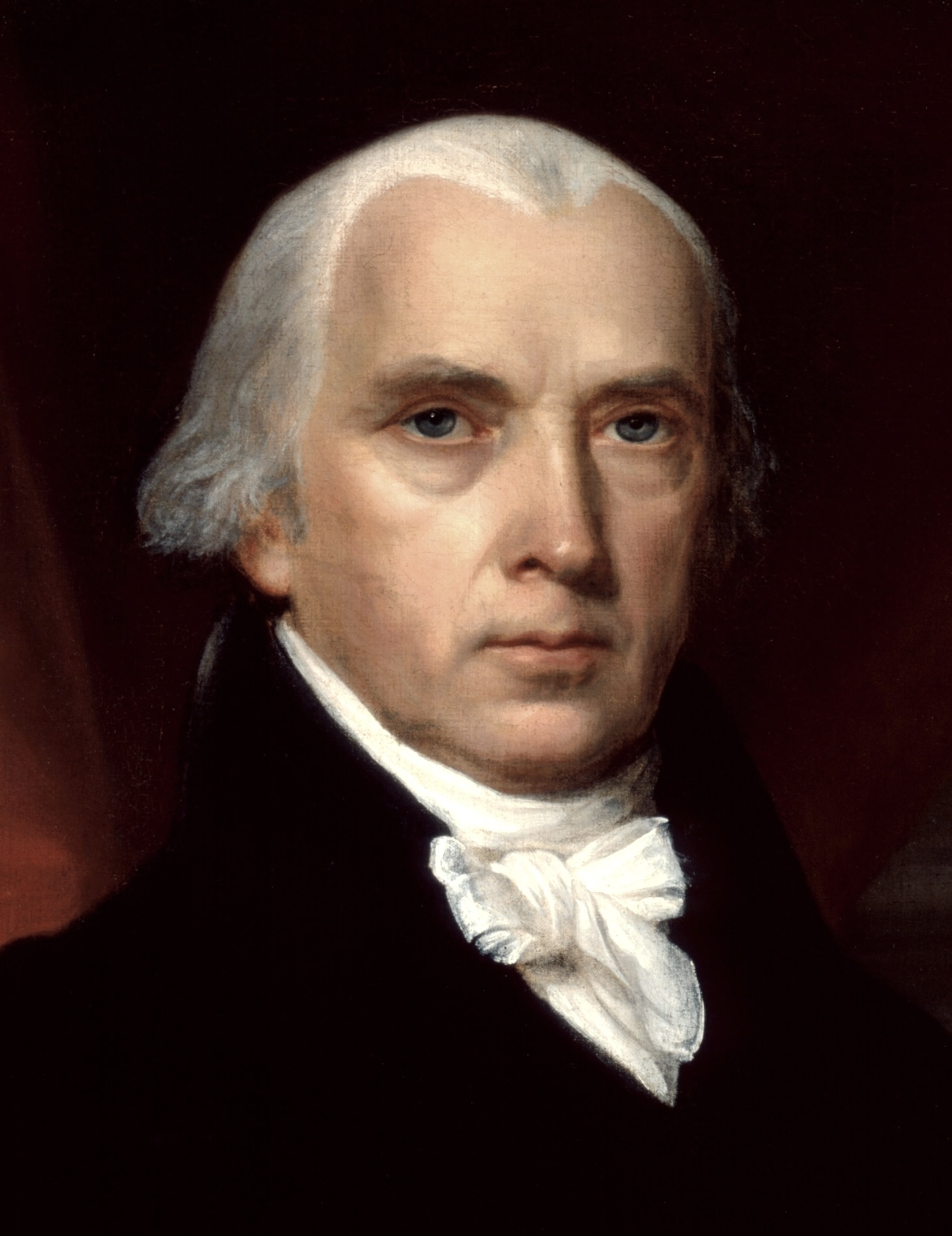

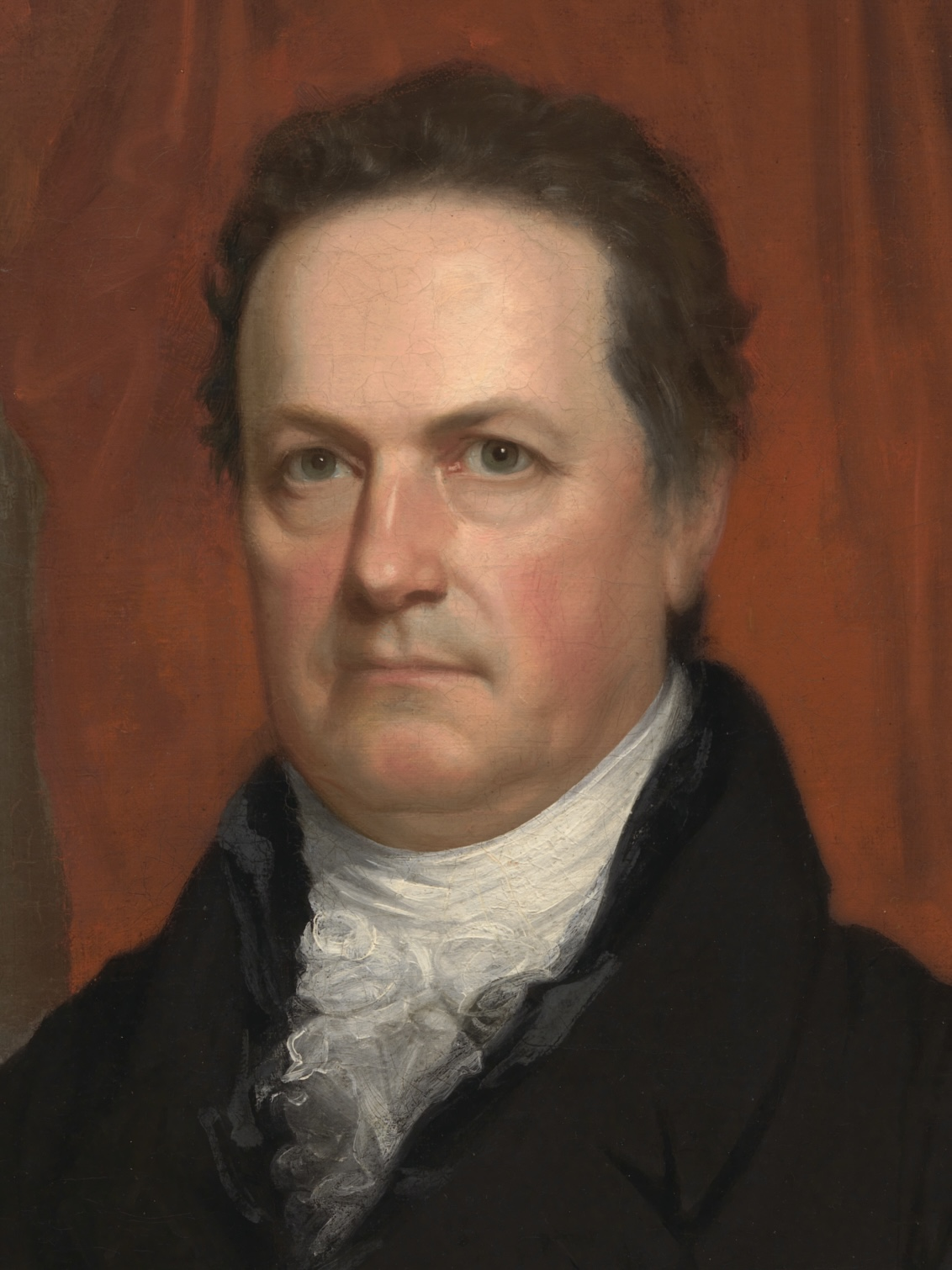
| Nominee | James Madison | DeWitt Clinton |
| Party | Democratic-Republican | Democratic-Republican (Note: While commonly labeled as the Federalist candidate, Clinton technically ran as a Democratic-Republican and was not nominated by the Federalist party itself, the latter simply deciding not to field a candidate. This did not prevent endorsements from state Federalist parties (such as in Pennsylvania), but he received the endorsement from the New York state Democratic-Republicans as well) |
| Alliance | | Federalist |
| Home state | Virginia | New York |
| Electoral vote | 6 | 5 |
| Popular vote | 14,046 | 13,092 |
| Percentage | 51.80% | 48.20% |
County results
Madison
50–60%
60–70%
70–80%
Clinton
50–60%
70–80%
80–90%
90–100%
President before election
James Madison
Democratic-Republican
Elected President
James Madison
Democratic-Republican

The 1812 United States presidential election in Maryland took place on an unknown date in 1812. Voters chose eleven representatives, or electors, to the Electoral College, who voted for president and vice president.

Early elections were quite different from modern ones. Voters voted for individual electors, who were pledged to vote for certain candidates. Often, which candidate an elector intended to support was unclear. Prior to the ratification of the 12th amendment, each elector did not distinguish between a vote cast for president and vice president, and simply cast two votes.

Starting with the 1796 United States presidential election and ending with the 1824 United States presidential election, Maryland used an electoral district system to choose its electors, with each district electing a single elector. This method is similar to the way Nebraska and Maine choose their electors in modern elections.

== Results ==
| Presidential candidate | Party | Home state | Popular vote | | Electoral vote |
| Presidential candidate | Party | Home state | Count | Percentage | Electoral vote |
|---|---|---|---|---|---|
| James Madison | Democratic-Republican | Virginia | 14,046 | 51.80% | 6 |
| DeWitt Clinton | Democratic-Republican/Federalist | New York | 13,092 | 48.20% | 5 |
| Total | | | 27,138 | 100.00% | 11 |

=== Results by electoral district ===
Results by district
| District | James Madison Democratic-Republican | | | DeWitt Clinton Federalist | | | Other Federalist | | | Margin | | Total votes cast |
| District | # | % | Electors | # | % | Electors | # | % | Electors | # | % | Total votes cast |
|---|---|---|---|---|---|---|---|---|---|---|---|---|
| 1 | 107 | 12.31% | 0 | 757 | 87.11% | 1 | 3 | 0.58% | 0 | -53 | -74.22% | 869 |
| 2 | 959 | 44.29% | 0 | 1,206 | 55.71% | 1 | 0 | 0.00% | 0 | -247 | -11.42% | 2,165 |
| 3 | 6,829 | 64.92% | 2 | 3,689 | 35.08% | 0 | 0 | 0.00% | 0 | 3,140 | 28.03% | 10,518 |
| 4 | 3,925 | 49.24% | 0 | 4,045 | 50.76% | 2 | 0 | 0.00% | 0 | -120 | -1.52% | 7,970 |
| 5 | 1,668 | 69.67% | 1 | 726 | 30.33% | 0 | 0 | 0% | 0 | 942 | 39.34% | 1,780 |
| 6 | 1,840 | 62.18% | 1 | 1,119 | 37.82% | 0 | 0 | 0% | 0 | 721 | 24.36% | 2,959 |
| 7 | 1,238 | 58.64% | 1 | 873 | 41.36% | 0 | 0 | 0.00% | 0 | 365 | 17.28% | 2,111 |
| 8 | 1,484 | 50.49% | 1 | 1,455 | 49.51% | 0 | 0 | 0.00% | 0 | 29 | 0.98% | 2,939 |
| 9 | 189 | 7.77% | 0 | 2,238 | 92.06% | 1 | 4 | 0.002% | 0 | -2053 | -84.29% | 2,431 |
| Total | 14,046 | 51.80% | 6 | 13,092 | 48.20% | 5 | 7 | | 0 | 954 | 3.60% | 27,138 |

=== Results by county ===
| County | James Madison Democratic-Republican | | DeWitt Clinton Democratic-Republican | | Others | | Margin | | Total votes cast |
| County | # | % | # | % | # | % | # | % | Total votes cast |
|---|---|---|---|---|---|---|---|---|---|
| Allegany | 436 | 45.85% | 515 | 54.15% | 0 | 0% | -79 | -8.30% | 951 |
| Anne Arundel | 733 | 57.90% | 533 | 42.10% | 0 | 0.00% | 200 | 15.80% | 1,266 |
| Baltimore (City and County) | 4,290 | 73.20% | 1,571 | 26.80% | 0 | 0% | 2,719 | 46.40% | 5,861 |
| Calvert | 339 | 46.57% | 389 | 53.43% | 0 | 0.00% | -50 | -6.86% | 728 |
| Caroline | 502 | 45.18% | 609 | 54.82% | 0 | 0.00% | -107 | -9.64% | 898 |
| Cecil | 768 | 49.58% | 781 | 50.42% | 0 | 0.00% | -13 | -0.84% | 1,549 |
| Charles | 34 | 7.57% | 415 | 92.43% | 0 | 0.00% | -381 | -84.86% | 449 |
| Dorchester | 322 | 29.81% | 758 | 70.19% | 0 | 0.00% | -436 | -40.38% | 1,080 |
| Frederick | 2,216 | 45.08% | 2,590 | 54.92% | 0 | 0.00% | -374 | -9.84% | 4,716 |
| Harford | 1,072 | 76.03% | 338 | 23.97% | 0 | 0.00% | 734 | 52.06% | 1,410 |
| Kent | 467 | 47.46% | 517 | 52.54% | 0 | 0.00% | -50 | -5.08% | 987 |
| Montgomery | 483 | 49.85% | 486 | 50.15% | 0 | 0.00% | -3 | -0.30% | 969 |
| Prince George's | 489 | 44.09% | 620 | 55.91% | 0 | 0.00% | 101 | 8.76% | 1,109 |
| Queen Anne's | 771 | 68.41% | 356 | 31.59% | 0 | 0.00% | 415 | 36.82% | 1,127 |
| St. Mary's | 58 | 18.65% | 253 | 81.35% | 0 | 0.00% | -195 | -62.70% | 321 |
| Somerset | 49 | 6.41% | 716 | 93.59% | 0 | 0.00% | -667 | -87.18% | 765 |
| Talbot | 670 | 48.13% | 722 | 51.87% | 0 | 0.00% | -52 | -3.74% | 482 |
| Washington | 1,364 | 59.20% | 940 | 40.80% | 0 | 0.00% | 424 | 18.40% | 2,304 |
| Worcester | 76 | 8.14% | 858 | 91.86% | 0 | 0.00% | -782 | -83.72% | 934 |
| Total | 15,139 | 52.01% | 13,967 | 47.98% | 0 | 0.00% | 1,172 | 4.03% | 29,106 |

==== Counties that flipped from Democratic-Republican to Federalist ====
- Caroline
- Cecil
- Frederick
- Kent
- Prince George's
- Talbot

== See also ==
- United States presidential elections in Maryland
- 1812 United States presidential election
- 1812 United States elections
