= 1812 United States presidential election in Pennsylvania =

- October 30 – December 2, 1812
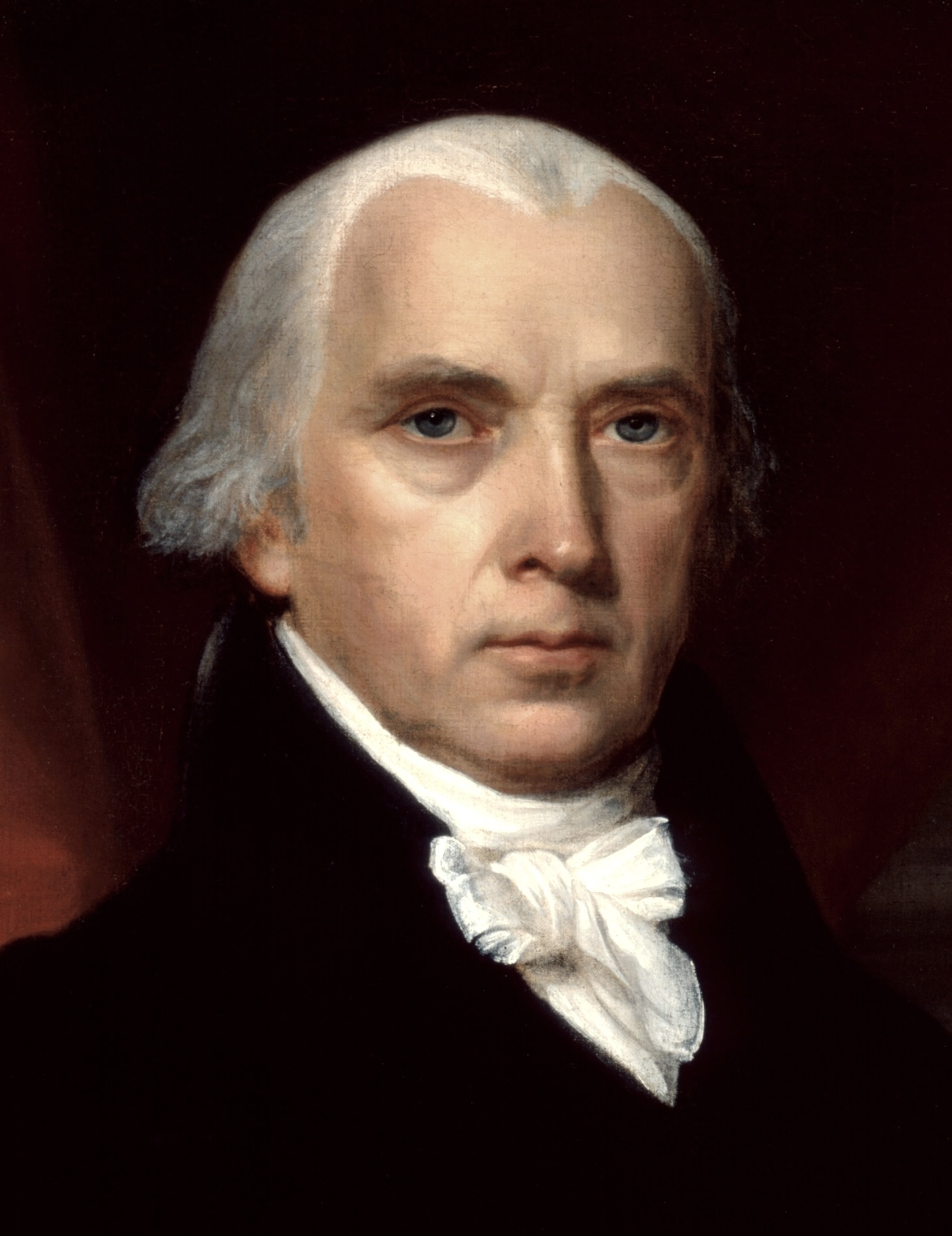

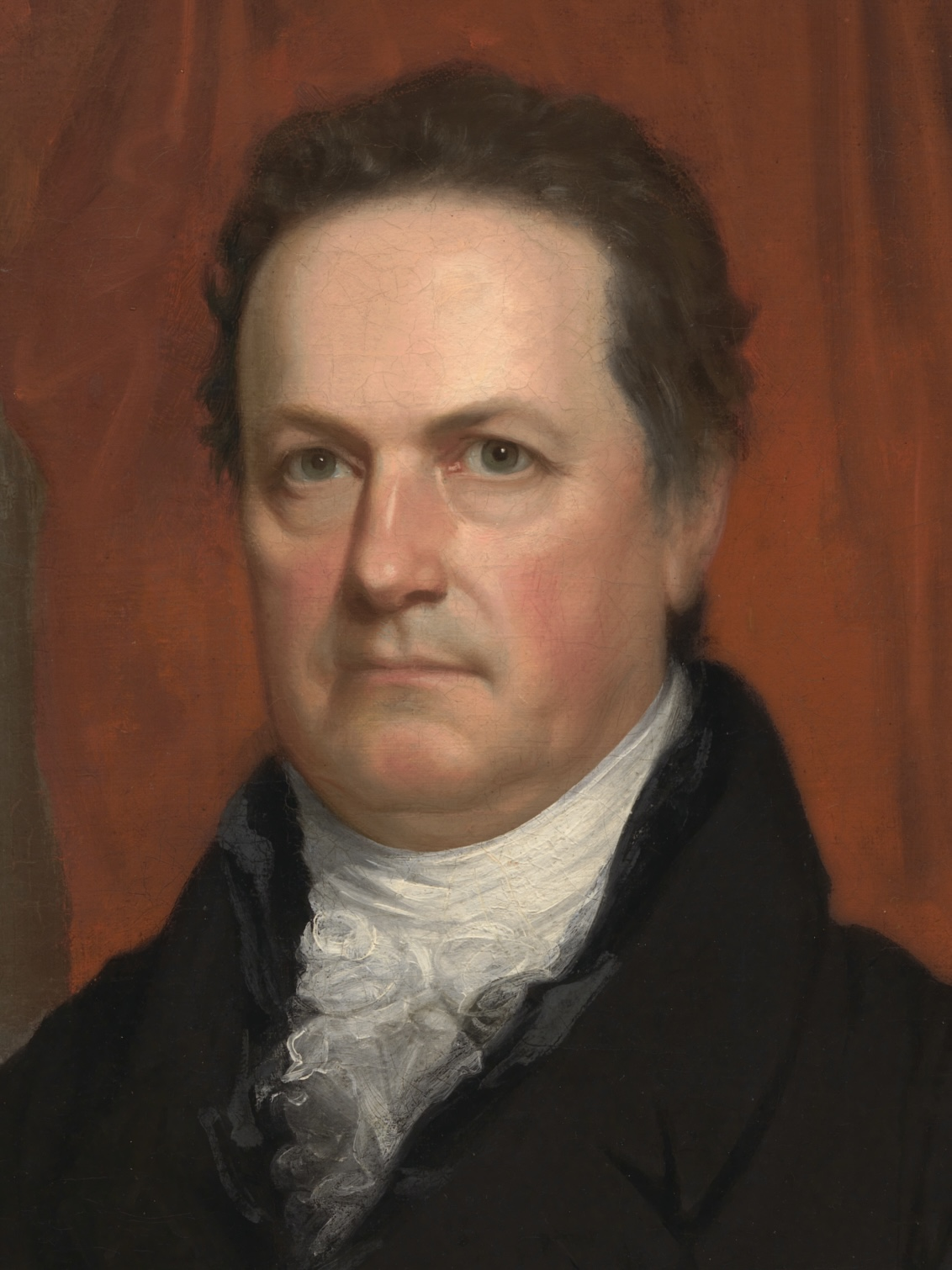
Nominee	James Madison	DeWitt Clinton
Party	Democratic-Republican	Democratic-Republican (Note: While commonly labeled as the Federalist candidate, Clinton technically ran as a Democratic-Republican and was not nominated by the Federalist party itself, the latter simply deciding not to field a candidate. This did not prevent endorsements from state Federalist parties (such as in Pennsylvania), but he received the endorsement from the New York state Democratic-Republicans as well.)
Alliance		Federalist
Home state	Virginia	New York
Running mate	Elbridge Gerry	Jared Ingersoll
Electoral vote	25	0
Popular vote	48,816	29,162
Percentage	62.60%	37.40%
County results
Madison
50–60%
60–70%
70–80%
80–90%
90–100%
Clinton
50–60%
60–70%
President before election
James Madison
Democratic-Republican
Elected President
James Madison
Democratic-Republican

A presidential election was held in Pennsylvania in 1812, as part of the 1812 United States presidential election. Voters chose 25 representatives, or electors to the Electoral College, who voted for President and Vice President.

Pennsylvania voted for the Democratic-Republican candidate, James Madison, over the other Democratic-Republican and Federalist supported candidate, DeWitt Clinton. Madison won Pennsylvania by a margin of 25.2%.

== Results ==
1812 United States presidential election in Pennsylvania
Party	Candidate	Votes	Percentage	Electoral votes
Democratic-Republican	James Madison (incumbent)	48,816	62.60%	25
Democratic-Republican/Federalist	DeWitt Clinton	29,162	37.40%	0
Totals		77,978	100.0%	25

Note: Election results totals only include known numbers, as verified by the source. Vote totals from several counties are missing/unknown.

=== County results ===
County	James Madison Democratic-Republican		DeWitt Clinton Federalist		Total votes cast
County	%	#	%	#	Total votes cast
Adams	35.47%	410	64.53%	746	1,156
Allegheny	59.96%	966	40.04%	645	1,611
Armstrong	70.35%	121	29.65%	51	172
Beaver	62.37%	383	37.62%	231	614
Bedford	56.20%	721	43.80%	562	1,283
Berks	81.36%	3,025	18.64%	693	3,718
Bucks	49.03%	2,184	50.97%	2,270	4,454
Butler	79.96%	375	20.04%	94	469
Cambria	64.03%	89	35.97%	50	139
Centre	85.33%	1,239	14.67%	213	1,452
Chester	47.28%	2,788	52.72%	3,109	5,897
Crawford	74.64%	2,455	25.36%	834	3,289
Cumberland	63.29%	269	36.71%	156	425
Dauphin	77.10%	1,842	22.90%	547	2,389
Dauphin (late return)	95.56%	86	4.44%	4	90
Delaware	32.58%	592	67.42%	1,225	1,817
Erie	54.09%	152	45.91%	129	281
Fayette	83.60%	999	16.40%	196	1,195
Franklin	66.89%	1,513	33.11%	749	2,262
Greene	64.98%	425	35.02%	229	654
Huntingdon	51.11%	712	48.89%	681	1,393
Indiana	62.27%	137	37.73%	83	220
Lancaster	39.32%	2,438	60.68%	3,762	6,200
Lehigh	82.53%	1,039	17.47%	220	1,259
Luzerne	36.41%	713	63.59%	1,245	1,958
Lycoming	72.38%	933	27.62%	356	1,289
Mercer	79.27%	367	20.73%	96	463
Mifflin	89.54%	1,053	10.46%	123	1,176
Montgomery	59.12%	2,623	40.88%	1,814	4,437
Northampton	80.10%	1,554	19.90%	386	1,940
Northumberland	85.14%	3,415	14.86%	596	4,011
Philadelphia	60.11%	6,987	39.89%	4,637	11,624
Susquehanna	82.76%	725	17.24%	151	876
Somerset	71.89%	422	28.11%	165	587
Venango & Warren	78.44%	131	21.56%	36	167
Washington	84.57%	2,334	15.43%	426	2,760
Wayne	74.44%	297	25.56%	102	399
Westmoreland	63.96%	818	36.04%	461	1,279
York	59.77%	2,090	40.23%	1,407	3,497
^{Source:}

== See also ==
- United States presidential elections in Pennsylvania
