= David Mead (military general) =

American general (1752–1816)

Major General David Mead
- Born: January 17, 1752; Hudson, Albany County, Province of New York
- Died: August 23, 1816 (aged 64); Meadville, Pennsylvania, US
- Occupation: Military officer
- Known for: Founder of Meadville, Pennsylvania
- Spouses: Agnes Mead, Jennett Mead
- Children: 7

Major General David Mead (January 17, 1752 – August 23, 1816) was an American military general and founder of Meadville, Pennsylvania.

== Life ==
David Mead was born January 17, 1752, in Hudson, Albany County, Province of New York, the son of Darius Mead and Ruth Mead. He was married twice, to Agnes Mead and Jennett Mead and had seven children. With a party of ten settlers, he founded Meadville, Pennsylvania, on May 12, 1788, at the confluence of Cussewago and French Creeks, near transportation routes.

Mead was an ensign in the 1st Battalion during the Revolutionary War. In 1796 he was appointed justice of the peace for "the Township of Mead in the county of Allegheny" and served as associate judge from 1803 until his death. He was major general of the 14th and 16th divisions of the Pennsylvania Militia and reappointed by Governor Snyder for the War of 1812. He was a charter member of Allegheny College. His daughter Elizabeth married Pennsylvania State politician Patrick Farrelly.

He died August 23, 1816, and is buried in Meadville.

== Legacy ==
A replica of the Mead cabin was erected along French Creek in Meadville during the city's bicentennial celebration in 1988.
